= 2015 Red Bull Frozen Rush =

2015 Red Bull Frozen Rush season

Season
- Races: 1
- Start date: January 8
- End date: January 9

Awards
- Drivers' champion: Bryce Menzies

The 2015 Red Bull Frozen Rush was the second Frozen Rush event. The event was held on January 8–9, 2015 at Sunday River Ski Resort near Newry, Maine. All competitors competed in 900 horsepower (670 kilowatts) four-wheel drive purpose built Trophy Trucks. BFGoodrich was the tire provider for the race. The United States Auto Club (USAC) sanctioned the event.

In the final, Bryce Menzies defeated 2014 winner Ricky Johnson, having beaten Brian Deegan and Rob MacCachren to reach the final.

== History ==
The event featured six returning drivers from the inaugural event along with new professional off-road drivers Brian Deegan, R. J. Anderson, and Chad Hord. Invitee Johnny Greaves withdrew about three weeks before the event because his team needed prepare new trucks for the upcoming short course season.

== Qualifying ==
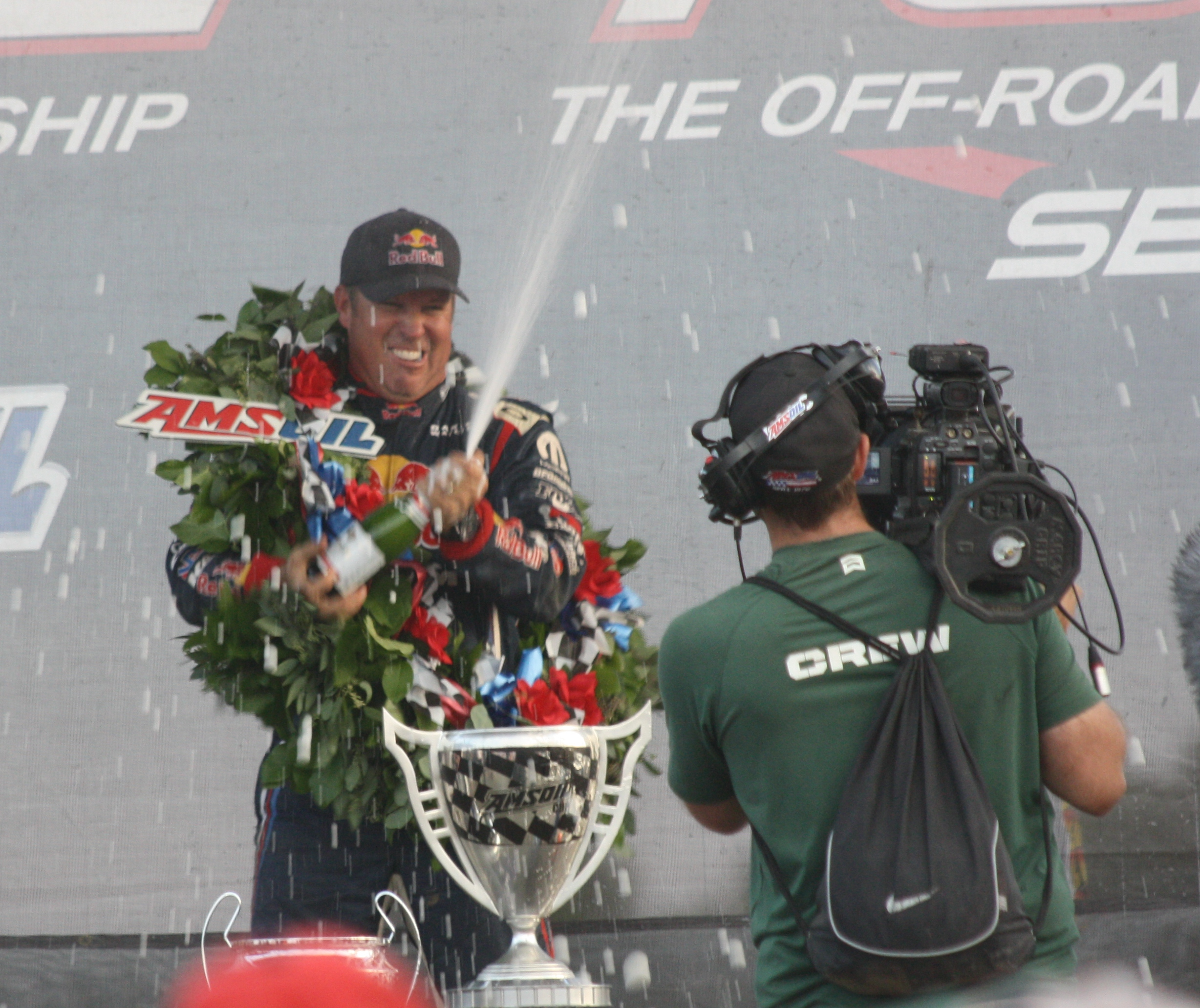
Fastest qualifier Ricky Johnson

Qualifying took place on January 8, 2015 and the trucks went to the pits immediately after qualifying. Defending champion Ricky Johnson posted the fastest time by 0.088 seconds.

Pos.	Driver	Time
1.	Ricky Johnson	1:33.997
2.	Bryce Menzies	1:34.085
3.	Rob MacCachren	1:34.886
4.	Scott Douglas	1:35.829
5.	Chad Hord	1:36.569
6.	R. J. Anderson	1:39.340
7.	Brian Deegan	1:40.015
8.	Carl Renezeder	2:00.231
9.	Todd LeDuc	Did Not Start (mechanical)

== Race ==
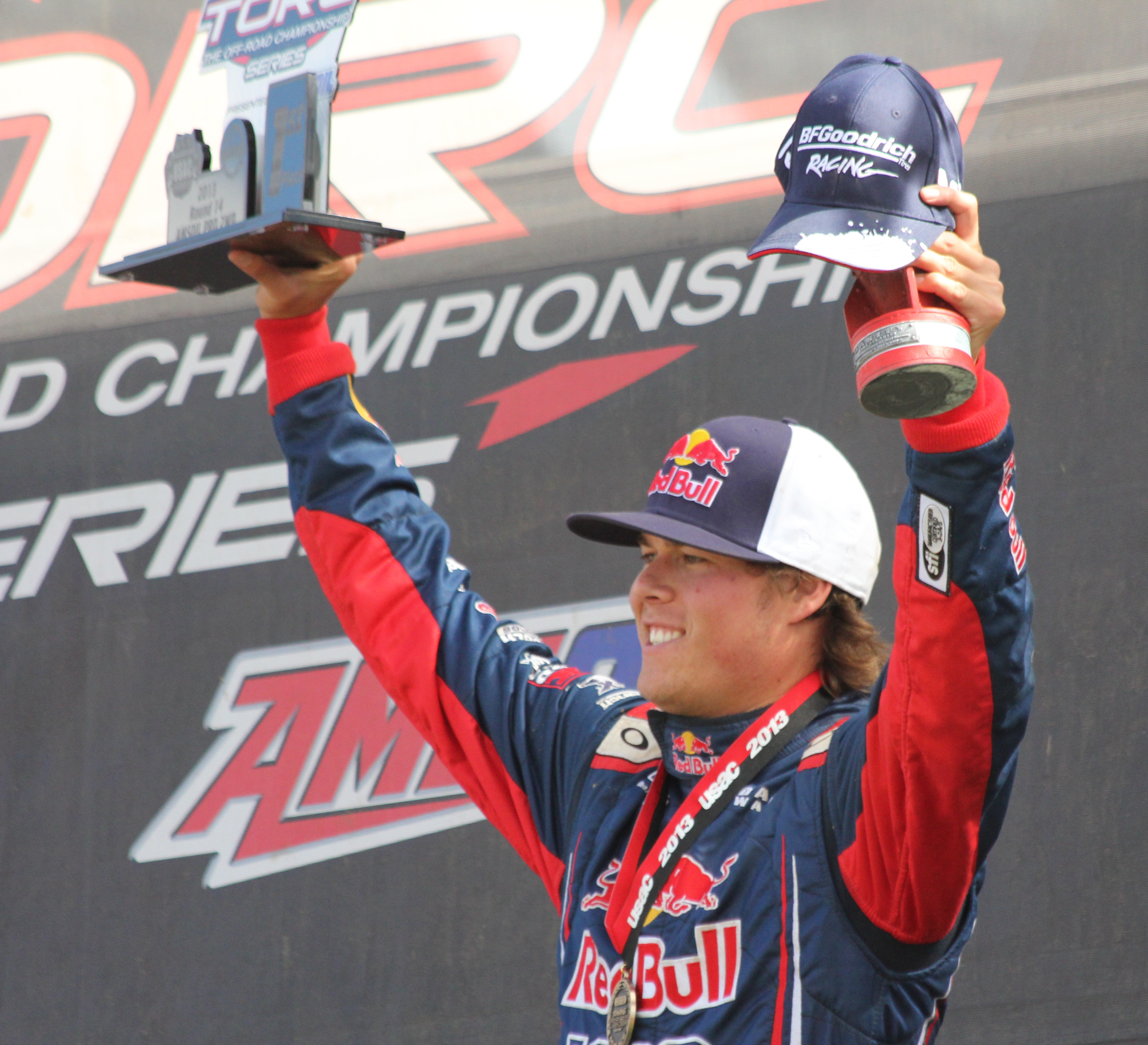
Winner Bryce Menzies

The race featured nine drivers and Bryce Menzies battled his teammate Ricky Johnson in the finals. Johnson had the hole shot but he landed sideways at the over/under costing him a lot of time. Menzies took the lead and maintained it for the remaining six laps to win.

In the battle for third place, Scott Douglas battled Rob MacCachren. The two were fairly even through the final lap. After nearly colliding in the downhill section, MacCachren came out of the final corner on the inside and won the race.

Last Chance Qualifier (LCQ)
Carl Renezeder	1
Todd LeDuc	0

Quarterfinals
Ricky Johnson	1
Carl Renezeder	0
Scott Douglas	1
Chad Hord	0
Bryce Menzies	1
Brian Deegan	0
Rob MacCachren	1
R.J. Anderson	0

Semifinals
Ricky Johnson	1
Scott Douglas	0
Bryce Menzies	1
Rob MacCachren	0

Final
Bryce Menzies	1
Ricky Johnson	0
