= Frozen Rush =

The Red Bull Frozen Rush was a short course off-road match race held on snowy alpine skiing slopes. The event debuted in 2014 featuring eight short-course and desert off-road racing drivers. Road & Track magazine said "The unique action provided a mix between the traditional stadium-style off-road racing and the crossover jumping from Global Rallycross."

== History ==
In 2013, Red Bull had their team driver Ricky Johnson haul one of his Pro 4 short course trucks across the United States from California to Mount Snow in Vermont for an exhibition on the ski slopes. Red Bull filmed the exhibition and the video was popular enough that they decided to turn it into a competition.

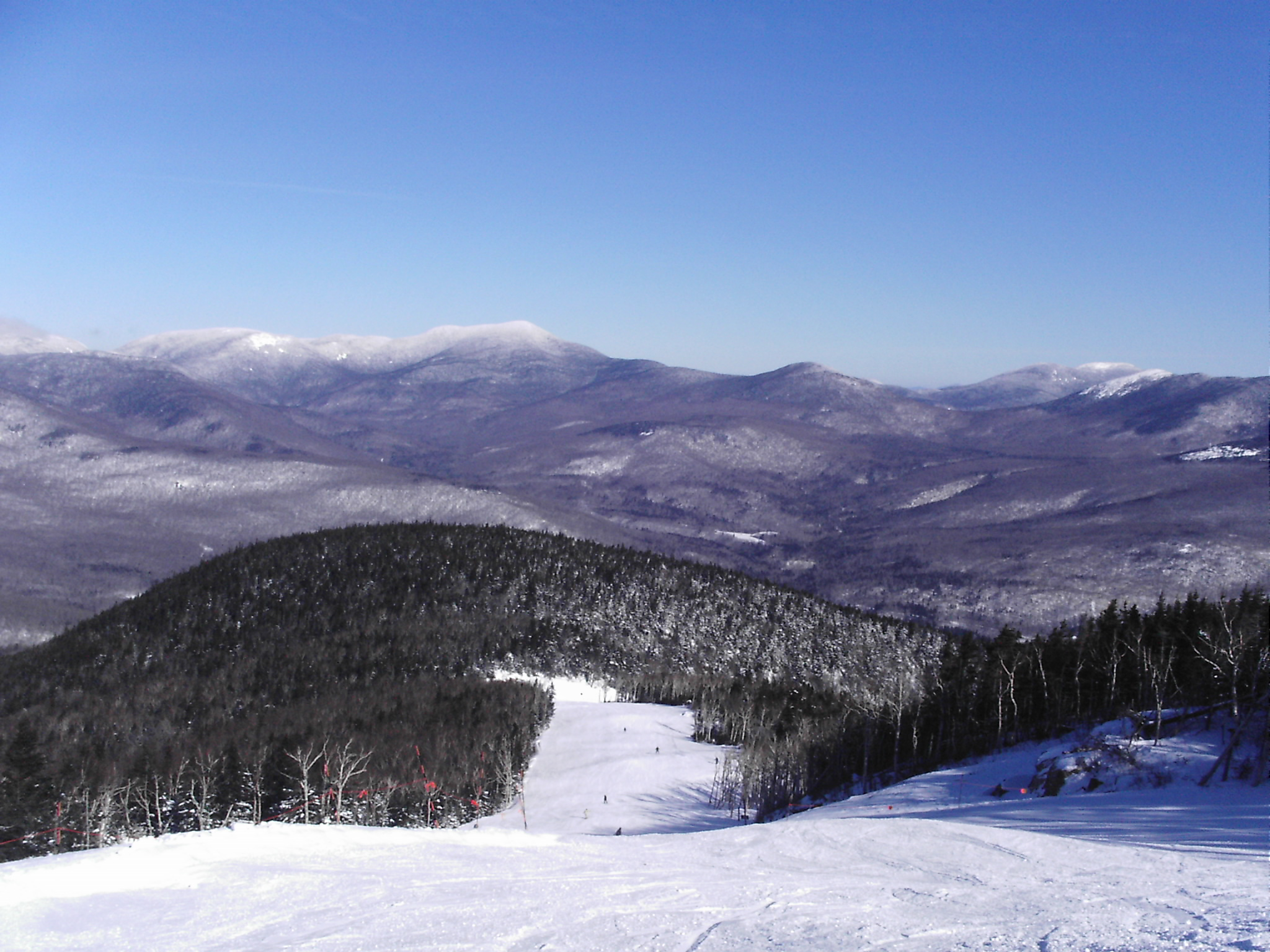
Ski slopes at Sunday River

The first competition happened in 2014 at the Sunday River Resort near Newry, Maine. The drivers raced the trucks on the resort's snowy ski slopes. About 10000 spectators attended the event with temperatures topping out below 10 °F (−12 °C).

== Vehicles ==
The event features Pro 4 four-wheel drive Trophy Trucks racing with studded tires. The BFGoodrich race tires featured an inner liner and approximately 700 studs. The studs damaged the fiberglass fenders of some trucks. The 900-horsepower trucks have modified jets in their carburetors for the less dense air in the higher altitude. Teams had to adjust their suspensions and gear ratios for the conditions. Trucks didn't need to use as efficient of cooling systems in the cooler temperatures.

== Drivers ==
In the inaugural 2014 event, eight drivers from the two national series (TORC and LOORRS) were selected to compete head to head with the victory advancing to the next round. Ricky Johnson beat Johnny Greaves in the final round for the win after Greaves received a 5-second penalty for hitting a gate. The 2014 Frozen Rush was broadcast taped delayed on NBC Sports' Red Bull Signature Series program. Drivers use thick gloves and heated helmet technology developed for snowmobile racing.

=== Competitors ===
Year	Winner	Other Competitors
2014	Ricky Johnson	2nd Johnny Greaves, 3rd Bryce Menzies, 4th Rob MacCachren, Carl Renezeder, Todd Leduc, Scott Douglas, Greg Adler
2015	Bryce Menzies	field: RJ Anderson, Brian Deegan, Scott Douglas, Chad Hord, Ricky Johnson, Todd Leduc, Rob MacCachren, Bryce Menzies, and Carl Renezeder
2016	Bryce Menzies	Ricky Johnson, Scott Douglas, Carl Renezeder, Chad Hord, Rob MacCachren, Johnny Greaves, RJ Anderson, CJ Greaves
