= 2011 Lucas Oil Off Road Racing Series =

The 2011 Lucas Oil Off Road Racing Series (a short course off-road racing series), is the third season of the Lucas Oil Off Road Racing Series.

== Tracks ==
The series will visit five different venues in 2011.

- Firebird International Raceway, Phoenix, AZ
- Speedworld Off Road Park, Surprise, AZ
- Glen Helen Raceway, San Bernardino, CA
- Miller Motorsports Park, Tooele, UT
- Las Vegas Motor Speedway, Las Vegas, NV

== Race results ==
The season consists of 15 championship rounds. The final round will count toward the Lucas Oil Off Road Challenge Cup.

=== Trucks and buggies ===
| Rd. | Date | Track | Pro 4 | Pro 2 | Pro Lite | Super Lite | Pro Buggy | Limited Buggy |
|---|---|---|---|---|---|---|---|---|
| 1 | 19 March | Firebird International Raceway | Rick Huseman | Bryce Menzies | Brian Deegan | RJ Anderson | Doug Fortin | John Fitzgerald |
| 2 | 20 March | Firebird International Raceway | Rick Huseman | Rob Naughton | Chris Brandt | Jeffrey Kargola | Mike Porter | Curt Geer |
| 3 | 16 April | Speedworld Off Road Park | Rick Huseman | Rob MacCachren | Chris Brandt | Jacob Person | Mike Porter | Dave Mason |
| 4 | 17 April | Speedworld Off Road Park | Rick Huseman | Rob MacCachren | Brian Deegan | Jacob Person | Steven Greinke | John Fitzgerald |
| 5 | 21 May | Glen Helen Raceway | Carl Renezeder | Carl Renezeder | Brian Deegan | RJ Anderson | Curt Geer | Steven Greinke |
| 6 | 22 May | Glen Helen Raceway | Kyle LeDuc | Carl Renezeder | Brian Deegan | Dawson Kirchner | Jerry Whelchel | John Fitzgerald |
| 7 | 25 June | Miller Motorsports Park | | | | | | |
| 8 | 26 June | Miller Motorsports Park | | | | | | |
| 9 | 6 August | Glen Helen Raceway | | | | | | |
| 10 | 7 August | Glen Helen Raceway | | | | | | |
| 11 | 24 September | Speedworld Off Road Park | | | | | | |
| 12 | 25 September | Speedworld Off Road Park | | | | | | |
| 13 | 5 November | Las Vegas Motor Speedway | | | | | | |
| 14 | 6 November | Las Vegas Motor Speedway | | | | | | |
| 15 | 10 December | Firebird International Raceway | | | | | | |
| - | 11 December | Firebird International Raceway | | | | | | |

=== Karts and UTVs ===
| Rd. | Date | Track | Kart Modified | Kart Junior 1 | Kart Junior 2 | UTV |
|---|---|---|---|---|---|---|
| 1 | 19 March | Firebird International Raceway | Mitchell Dejong | Eliott Watson | Myles Cheek | Corry Weller |
| 2 | 20 March | Firebird International Raceway | Mitch Guthrie Jr | Travis Pecoy | Maxwell Ries | Code Rahders |
| 3 | 16 April | Speedworld Off Road Park | Mitchell Dejong | Eliott Watson | Myles Cheek | Doug Mittag |
| 4 | 17 April | Speedworld Off Road Park | Mitch Guthrie Jr | Eliott Watson | Chad Graham | Doug Mittag |
| 5 | 21 May | Glen Helen Raceway | Mitch Guthrie Jr | Eliott Watson | Chad Graham | Code Rahders |
| 6 | 22 May | Glen Helen Raceway | Mitchell DeJong | Travis Pecoy | Myles Cheek | Code Rahders |
| 7 | 25 June | Miller Motorsports Park | | | | |
| 8 | 26 June | Miller Motorsports Park | | | | |
| 9 | 6 August | Glen Helen Raceway | | | | |
| 10 | 7 August | Glen Helen Raceway | | | | |
| 11 | 24 September | Speedworld Off Road Park | | | | |
| 12 | 25 September | Speedworld Off Road Park | | | | |
| 13 | 5 November | Las Vegas Motor Speedway | | | | |
| 14 | 6 November | Las Vegas Motor Speedway | | | | |
| 15 | 10 December | Firebird International Raceway | | | | |
| - | 11 December | Firebird International Raceway | | | | |
