= Ricky Johnson =

American motorcycle racer

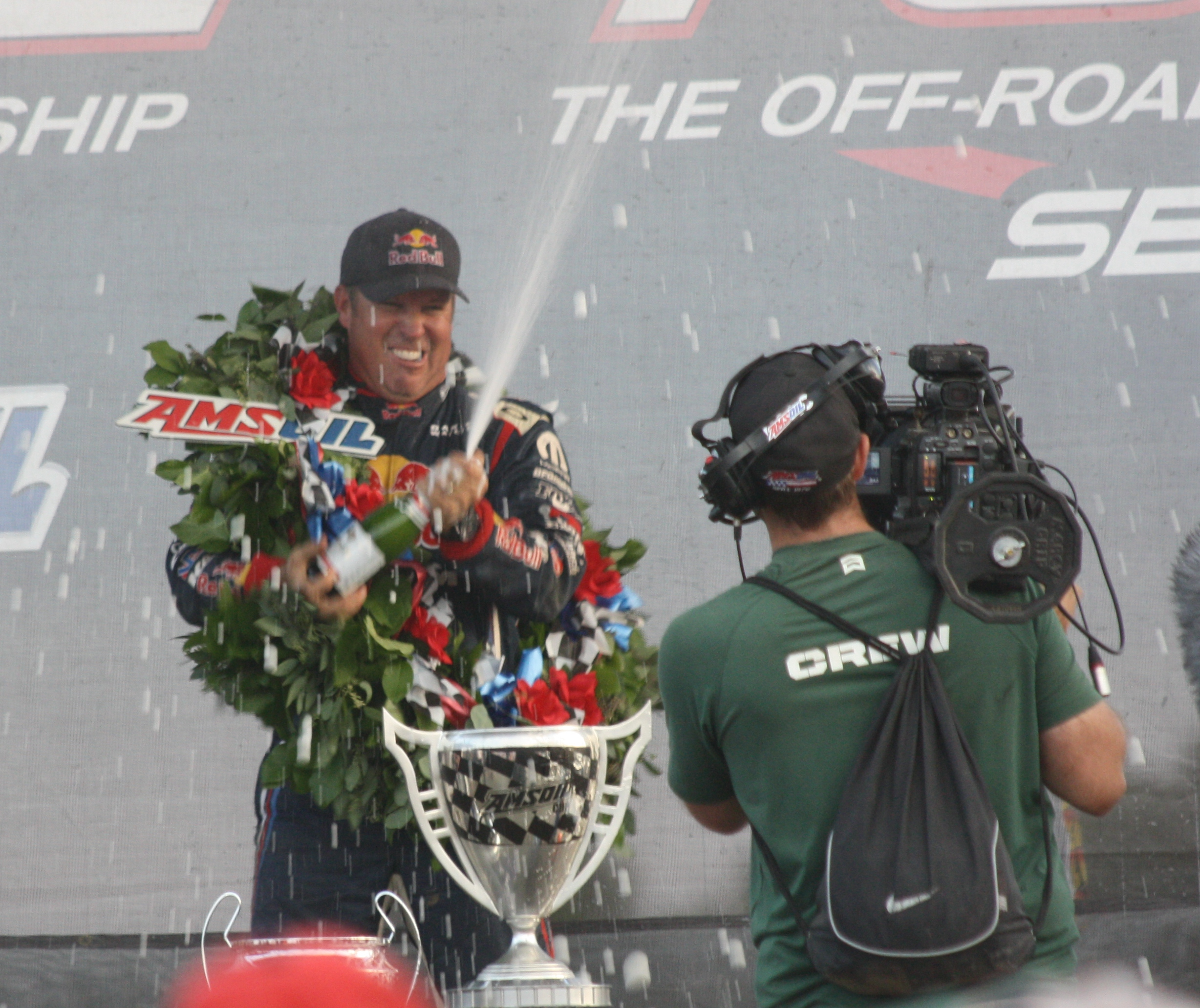
- Johnson celebrates winning the 2012 AMSOIL Cup
- Nationality: American
- Born: Richard Bernard Johnson Jr. July 6, 1964 (age 62) El Cajon, California, U.S.
- Relatives: Luke Johnson

TORC: The Off Road Championship Pro 4 career
- Debut season: 2011
- Current team: Vildosola Racing
- Championships: 2011, 2012,2017,2018,2019,2020,2021,2022,2023
- Best finish: 1st in 2011, 2012
- Finished last season: 1st

Previous series
- 2013, 2021 2009–2010: Stadium Super Trucks; TORC Pro 2

Championship titles
- 1984 AMA 250; 1986 AMA 250 and Supercross; 1987 AMA 250 and 500; 1988 AMA 500 and Supercross; TORC Pro 2 (2010); TORC Pro 4 (2011, 2012)

Awards
- AMA Motorcycle Hall of Fame inductee (1999); Motorsports Hall of Fame of America inductee (2012); 1997 and 2003 Baja 1000 winner 1999 American Speed Association Rookie of the Year; 2012 AMSOIL Cup winner 2014 Frozen Rush winner

NASCAR FedEx Freight Truck Series career
- 12 races run over 4 years
- Best finish: 31st (1996)
- First race: 1995 Spears Manufacturing 200 (Mesa Marin)
- Last race: 1997 Carquest 420K (Las Vegas)
Wins	Top tens	Poles
0	2	0
- Statistics up to date as of February 3, 2014.

Richard Bernard "Ricky" Johnson Jr. (born July 6, 1964) is an American former professional motocross, off-road truck and stock car racing driver. He competed in AMA motocross and Supercross during the 1980s and, won seven AMA national championships. He later switched to off-road racing. He won the Pro 2WD Trophy Truck championship in the 1998 Championship Off-Road Racing and 2010 TORC Series. He also won the Pro 4WD class at the 2011 and 2012 TORC Series. In September 2012, Johnson won the 4x4 world championship race at Crandon International Off-Road Raceway and later that day won the AMSOIL Cup pitting the two and four wheel drive trucks. Johnson won the 2014 Frozen Rush, the first short-course off-road race on snow.

== Racing career ==
=== Motocross career ===
Johnson was born in El Cajon, California where his father was an avid motorcyclist who bought his son a mini-bike when he was three years old. When he turned 16 in 1980, he earned his pro license. He won his first 250cc class national championship in 1984 for the Yamaha factory motocross team. For the 1986 season, he was offered a job with the Honda team by team manager and five time former world champion Roger De Coster. He battled his Honda teammate David Bailey throughout the 1986 season, coming away with the 250 title and the Supercross crown. De Coster picked Johnson, Bailey and another Honda teammate Johnny O'mara to represent the US in the Motocross des Nations in Maggiora, Italy. Team U.S.A. won with a clean sweep. Back home, he finished second to Bailey in the 500 class. The rivalry was short-lived as just prior to the start of the 1987 season, Bailey was paralyzed in a practice crash.

Johnson dominated the 1987 season, winning both the 250 and 500 crowns. In 1987, Johnson also won what is considered one of Supercross history's greatest races in the Super Bowl of Motocross at the L.A. Coliseum. After crashing in the first corner, Johnson came back from near dead last to pass Jeff Ward and eventually privateer Guy Cooper on the penultimate lap to squeeze the win. Johnson followed this performance by adding the 1988 Supercross and 500 titles to his name.

Johnson started the 1989 season strongly but suffered a serious injury when he broke his wrist in a practice session. He would never fully recover from the injury. He soldiered on for a few more seasons but the injury proved too debilitating. He announced his retirement at the beginning of the 1991 season.

At the time of his retirement from motocross racing at age 26, Johnson was the all-time leader in Supercross victories. He was inducted into the AMA Motorcycle Hall of Fame in 1999 and the Motorsports Hall of Fame of America in 2012.

=== Career after motocross ===
Johnson went on to have success in off-road racing and stock car racing. He took wins in the famous Baja 1000 twice and was American Speed Association stock car series Rookie of the Year in 1999, driving for Herzog Motorsports as a teammate to unrelated El Cajon, CA off-road racer Jimmie Johnson. Johnson ran twelve races in the NASCAR Craftsman Truck Series from 1995 to 1997.

==== Off-road racing ====
Pro 2 demonstration

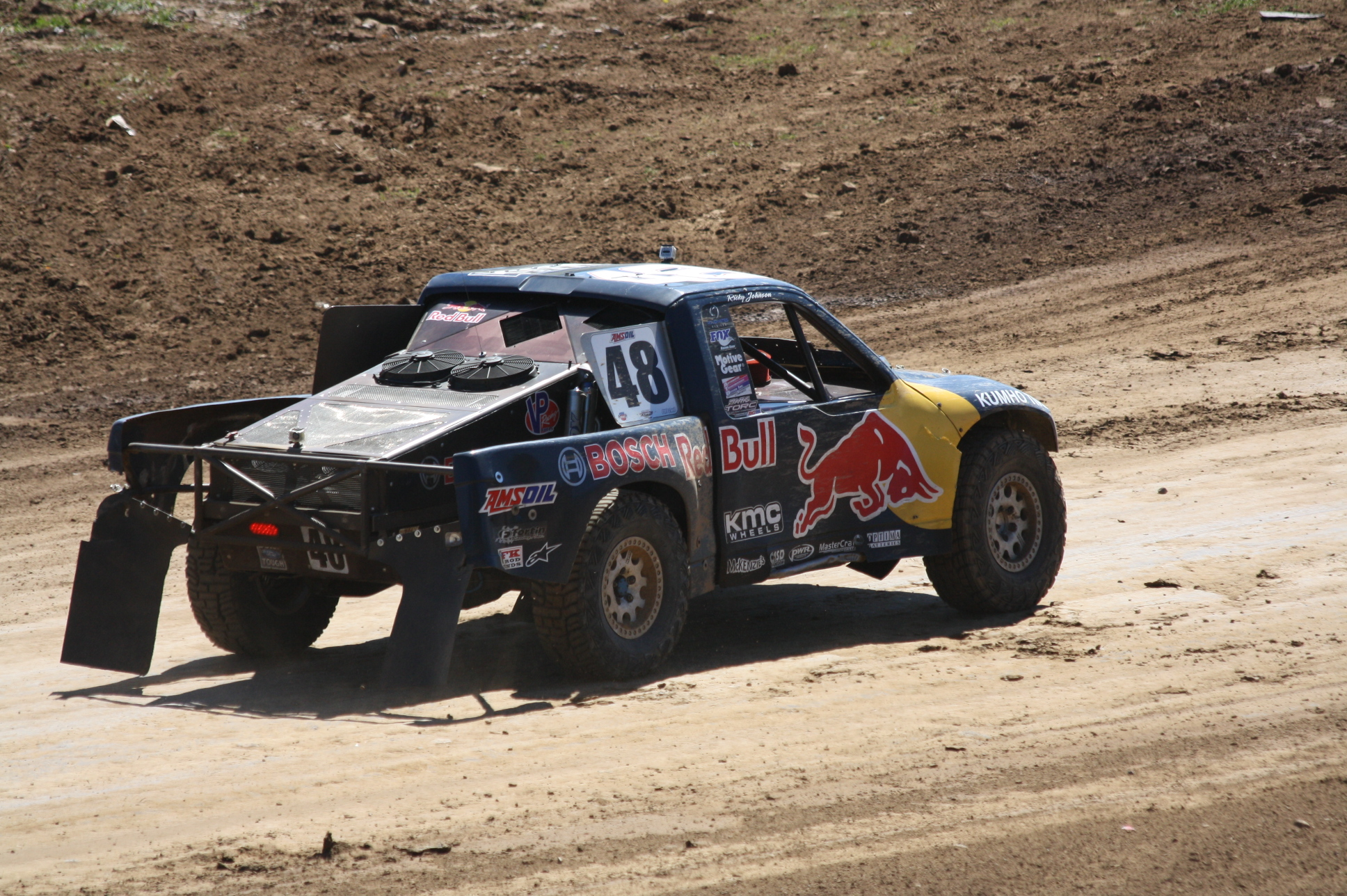
Johnson's 2010 truck

Johnson founded the Traxxas TORC Series for the 2009 season. He sold the series after the season to the United States Auto Club (USAC) and he concentrated on being a driver. Johnson won the TORC Series Pro2wd Championship in 2010 after a season long battle with Rob MacCachren, the defending champ. This championship came down to the last race of the season at Crandon International Off-Road Raceway with Johnson securing a second-place finish to win the championship.

In 2012, Johnson won the Pro 4x4 World Championship race on Sunday at Crandon's second race weekend. Later that day, he won the AMSOIL Cup pitting the Pro 4x4 and Pro 2 drivers against each other.

In 2013, Johnson joined some Stadium Super Trucks races, with sponsorship from Jegs High Performance. He did not return to the series until 2021 at the Music City Grand Prix.

Johnson started 2014 early by competing in the Red Bull-sponsored Frozen Rush race. This inaugural event featured Pro 4 trucks racing with studded tires on snowy mountain slopes at Sunday River in Maine. Eight drivers from the two national series (TORC and LOORRS) were selected to compete head to head with the victory advancing to the next round. Johnson beat Johnny Greaves in the final round for the win.

In addition to short course truck racing, Johnson has competed in desert off-road races. In 2009 and 2010, he was third in the Unlimited Truck class of the SNORE Mint 400.

== Personal life ==
Johnson now lives in Southern California with his wife, Stephanie, and their children.

== Images ==
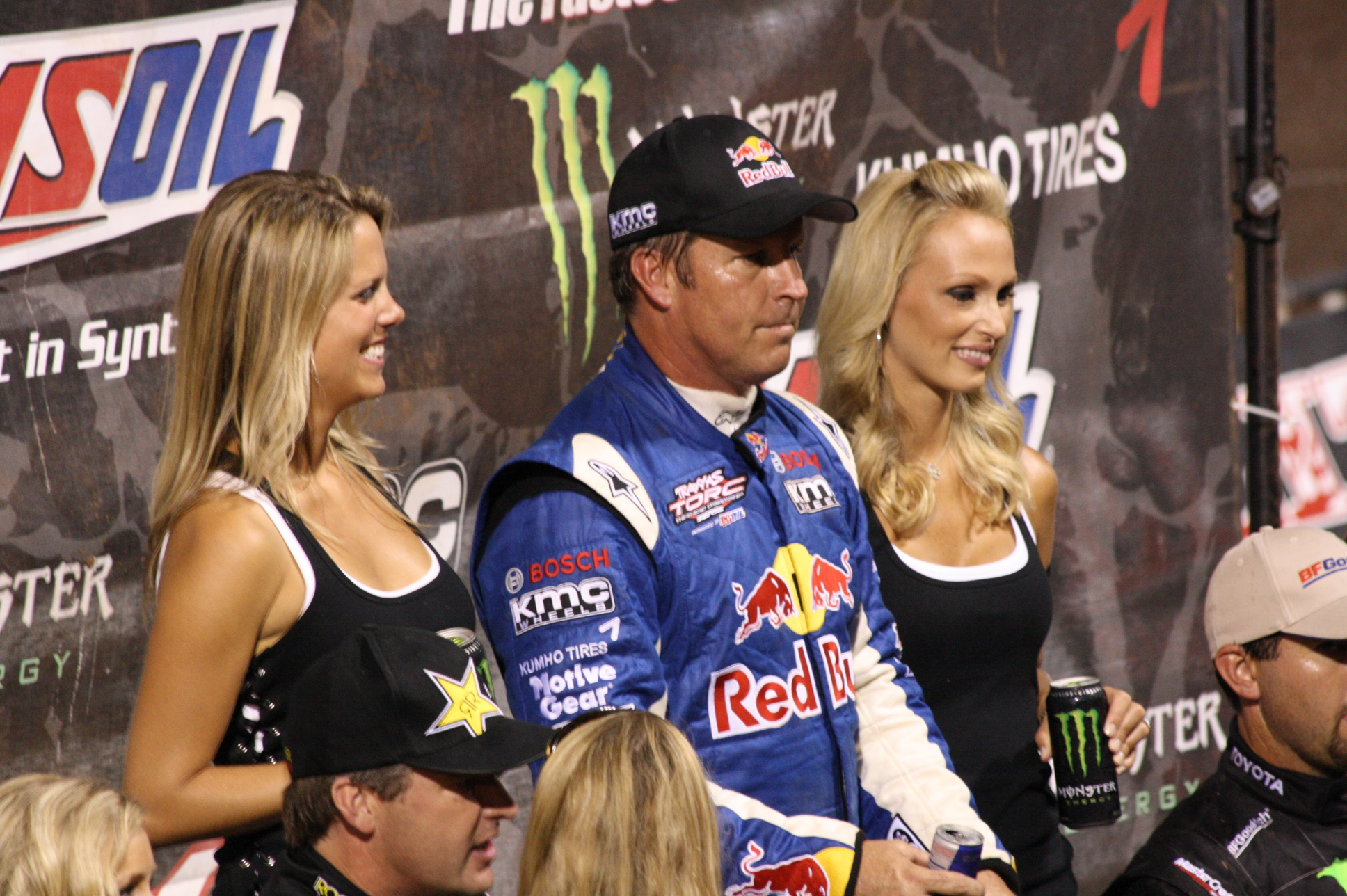
Johnson after winning a Traxxas TORC Series race in 2010

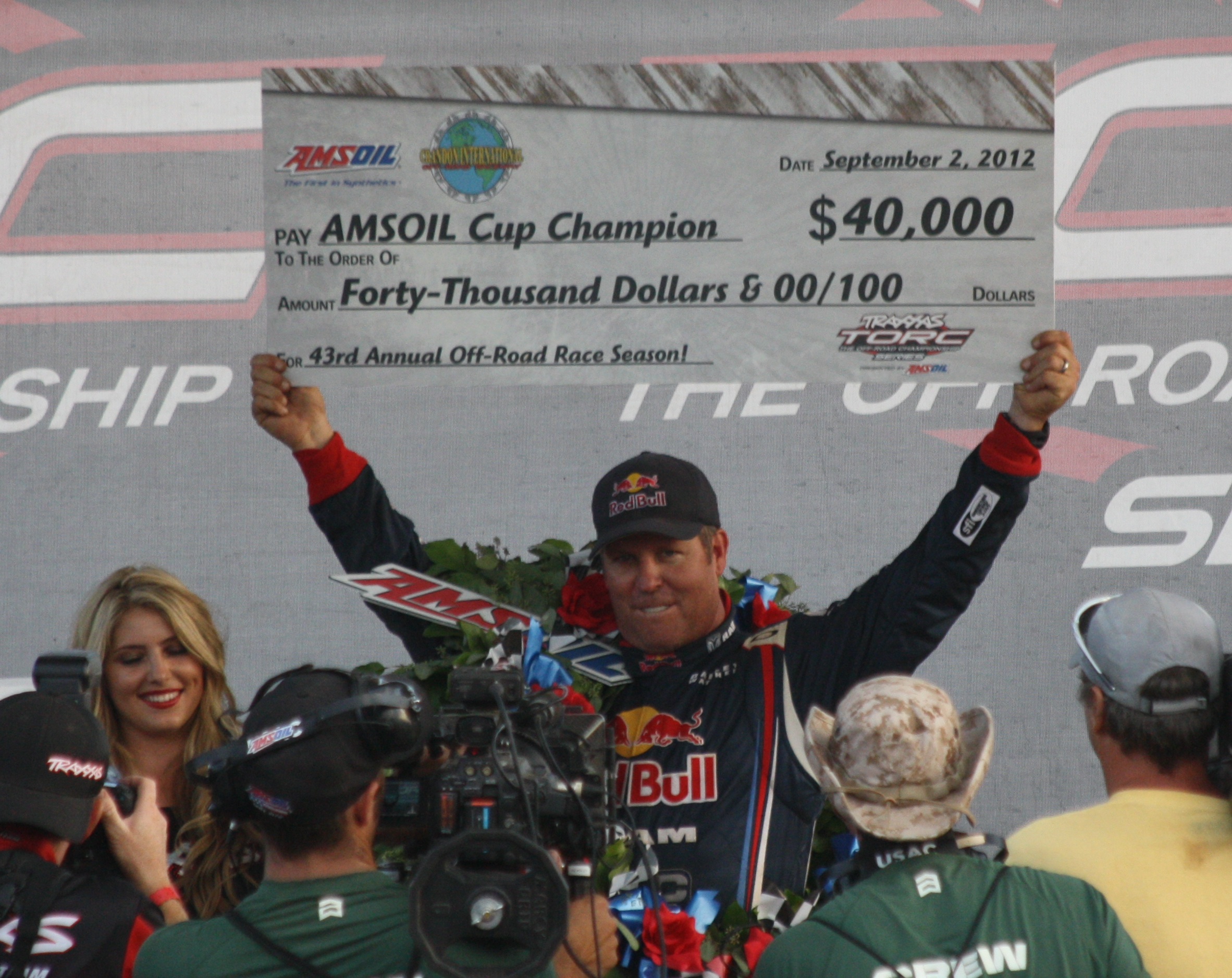
Holding US$40,000 check for winning 2012 AMSOIL Cup

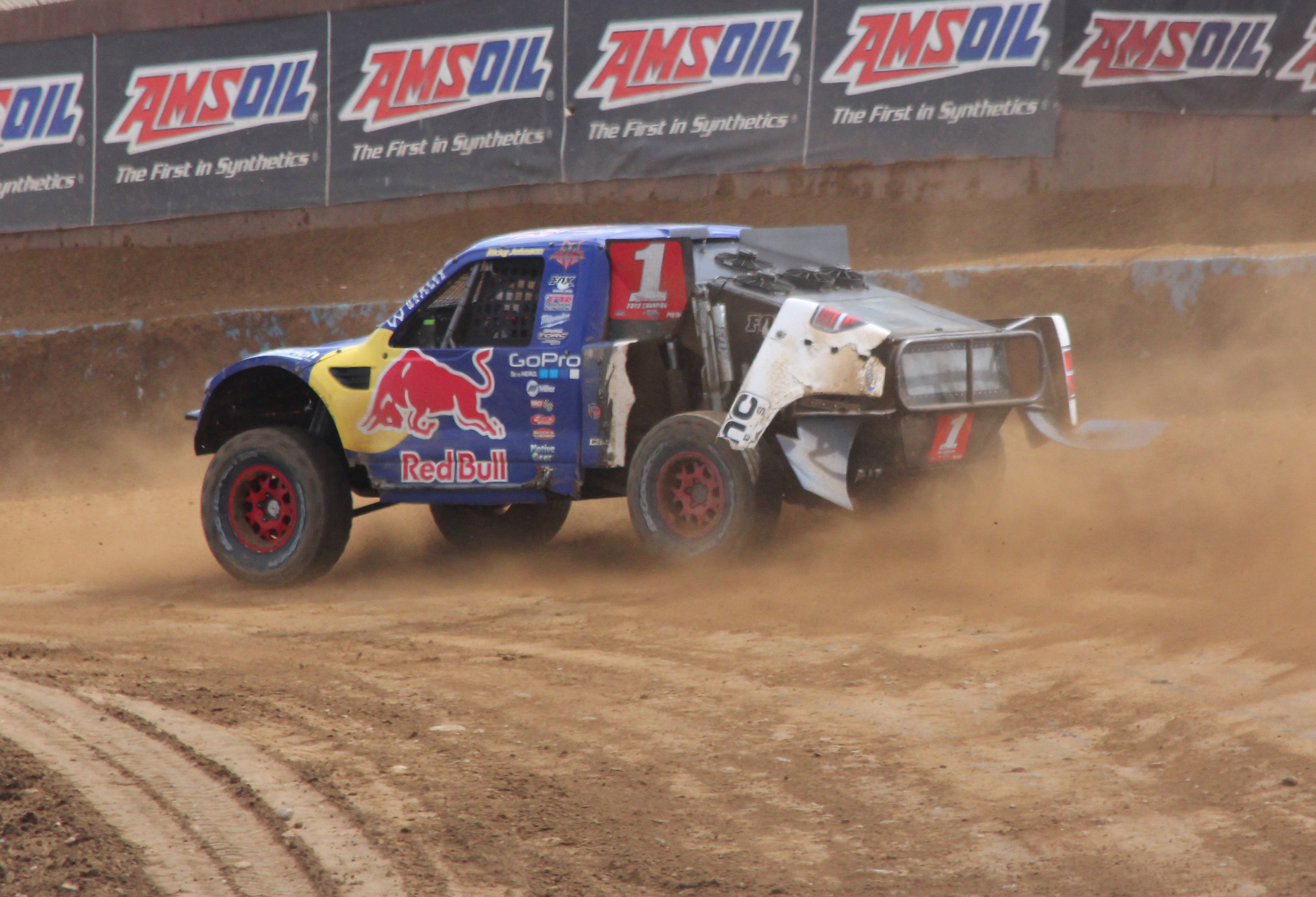
2013 Pro 4 Trophy Truck

== Motorsports career results ==
=== NASCAR ===
(key) (Bold – Pole position awarded by qualifying time. Italics – Pole position earned by points standings or practice time. * – Most laps led.)

==== Craftsman Truck Series ====
NASCAR Craftsman Truck Series results
Year	Team	No.	Make	1	2	3	4	5	6	7	8	9	10	11	12	13	14	15	16	17	18	19	20	21	22	23	24	25	26	27	NCTC	Pts	Ref
1995	Vestar Motorsports	01	Chevy	PHO	TUS	SGS	MMR	POR	EVG	I70	LVL	BRI	MLW	CNS	HPT	IRP	FLM	RCH	MAR	NWS	SON	MMR; 25	PHO								93rd	88	
1996	Penske Racing	22	Ford	HOM	PHO	POR; 25	EVG; 15	TUS	CNS; DNQ	HPT	BRI	NZH	MLW	LVL	I70	IRP	FLM	GLN; 30	NSV	RCH	NHA	MAR									31st	786	
1996	Billy Ballew Motorsports	15	Ford																				NWS; 27	SON; 23	MMR; 21	PHO; 15	LVS; 38				31st	786	
1997	Prime Performance Motorsports	63	Chevy	WDW	TUS	HOM	PHO	POR	EVG	I70	NHA	TEX	BRI	NZH	MLW	LVL	CNS	HPT	IRP	FLM	NSV	GLN; 8	RCH	MAR	SON; 4	MMR	CAL; DNQ	PHO	LVS; 17		48th	414	
1998	Prime Performance Motorsports	63	Chevy	WDW; DNQ	HOM	PHO	POR	EVG	I70	GLN	TEX	BRI	MLW	NZH	CAL	PPR	IRP	NHA	FLM	NSV	HPT	LVL	RCH	MEM	GTY	MAR	SON	MMR	PHO	LVS	NA	-	

=== Stadium Super Trucks ===
(key) (Bold – Pole position. Italics – Fastest qualifier. * – Most laps led.)

Stadium Super Trucks results
Year	1	2	3	4	5	6	7	8	9	10	11	12	13	14	SSTC	Pts	Ref
2013	PHO	LBH; 4	LAN; 13	**SDG**; 2*	SDG; 5	STL	TOR	TOR	CRA	CRA	OCF	OCF	OCF	CPL	8th	123	
2021	STP	STP	MOH	MOH	MOH	MOH	NSH; 13	**NSH**; 13	LBH	LBH					21st	16	

Sporting positions
Preceded by none	Red Bull Frozen Rush Champion; 2014	Succeeded by Bryce Menzies
