= Snore (disambiguation) =

Snore or snoring may refer to:

- SNORE, Southern Nevada Off Road Enthusiasts, an off-road desert racing organization
- Edvīns Šnore, Latvian film director
- Snoring
