= 2014 Red Bull Frozen Rush =

2014 Red Bull Frozen Rush season

Season
- Races: 7
- Start date: January 9
- End date: January 10

Awards
- Drivers' champion: (California) Ricky Johnson

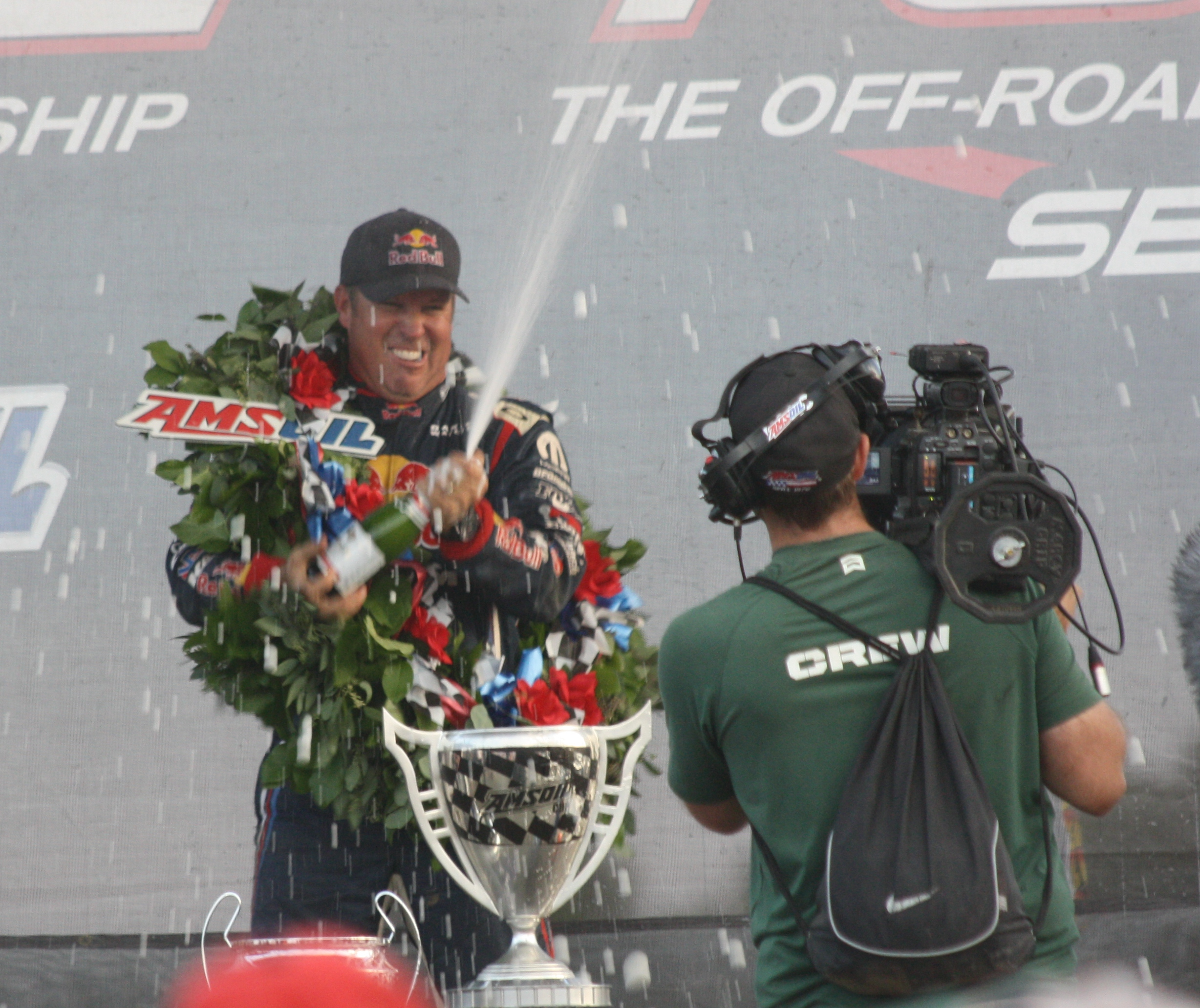
Winner Ricky Johnson

The 2014 Red Bull Frozen Rush was the inaugural Frozen Rush event. The event was held on January 9–10, 2014 at Sunday River Ski Resort near Newry, Maine. All competitors competed in four-wheel drive purpose built Trophy Trucks.

== Qualifying ==
Pos.	Driver	Time
1.	(Nevada) Rob MacCachren	100.619
2.	(Arizona) Bryce Menzies	101.594
3.	(California) Carl Renezeder	103.445
4.	(Wisconsin) Johnny Greaves	104.537
5.	(California) Scott Douglas	107.286
6.	(California) Ricky Johnson	107.688
7.	(California) Greg Adler	107.872
8.	(California) Todd LeDuc	116.213

== Race ==
Quarterfinals
(Nevada) Rob MacCachren	1
(California) Todd LeDuc	0
(Wisconsin) Johnny Greaves	1
(California) Scott Douglas	0
(California) Carl Renezeder	0
(California) Ricky Johnson	1
(Arizona) Bryce Menzies	1
(California) Greg Adler	0

Semifinals
(Nevada) Rob MacCachren	1
(Wisconsin) Johnny Greaves	0
(California) Ricky Johnson	1
(Arizona) Bryce Menzies	0

Final
(Wisconsin) Johnny Greaves	0
(California) Ricky Johnson	2
