= Rick Huseman =

American racing driver

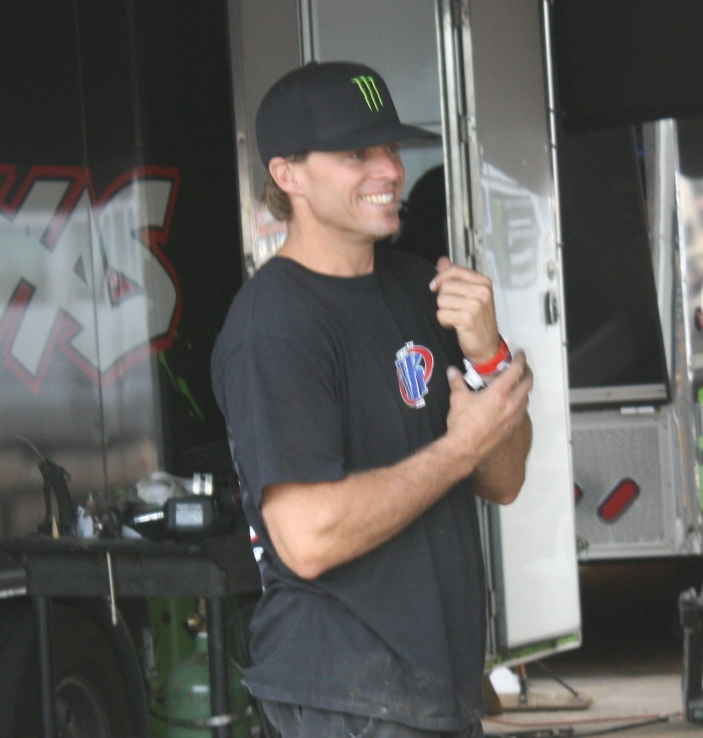
- Huseman talking with a fan in 2010 at Crandon
- Nationality: American
- Born: July 9, 1973
- Died: October 16, 2011 (aged 38) Barstow, California, U.S.

Lucas Oil Off Road Racing Series
- Years active: 1997–2011
- Wins: 50
- Best finish: 1st in 2010

Previous series
- 1997 - 2010: Traxxas TORC Series; CORR

Championship titles
- 2009: TORC Pro 4

Awards
- 2010: Driver of the Year by DirtSports Magazine

Rick Huseman (July 9, 1973 – October 16, 2011) was an American race driver from Riverside, California. He raced off-road and his career peaked in the highest level in a four wheel drive (Pro 4) short course racing truck. He won the 2009 Traxxas TORC Series (TORC) and 2010 Lucas Oil Off Road Racing Series (LOORRS) championships before dying in an airplane crash in late 2011. He had won 50 races in his career between Pro Light and Pro 4.

== Racing career ==
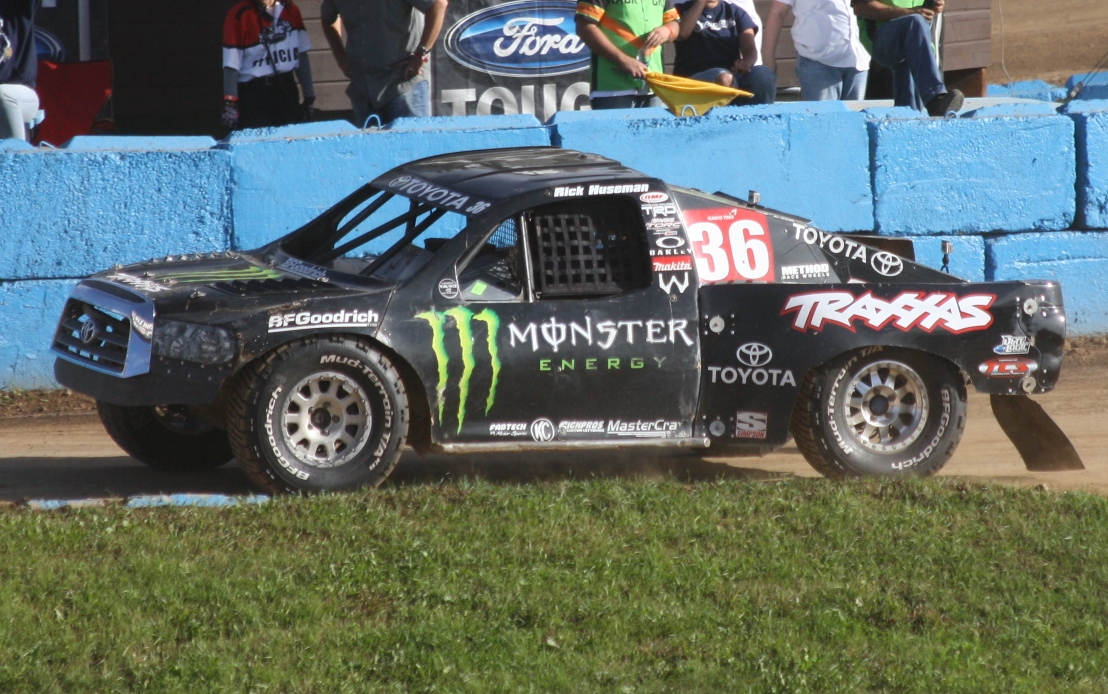
Huseman racing at the 2010 World Championships at Crandon International Off-Road Raceway.

Prior to racing, Huseman worked along with his father at a Ford dealer in Riverside, California. Huseman attended a 1996 SODA race at Glen Helen Raceway after being a sand dune enthusiast in motorcycles with his brother Danny. The brothers built a Class 7s Pro Light truck for 1997, racing in desert races along with Glen Helen. They attended the Off-Road World Championship races at the Crandon International Off-Road Raceway in 1999 and decided to build a PRO Lite chassis to race in Championship Off-Road Racing (CORR). Huseman competed for the 2000 CORR season championship finishing ninth of the fifteen drivers. In 2001 he battled Jeff Kincaid for the championship. Kincaid won four races to Huseman's five but Kincaid won the championship by seven points. It was the first of Huseman's four consecutive second-place finishes in the points.

Huseman moved to Pro 4 trucks in 2005 when he bought a four-year-old truck from Johnny Greaves. In his first season, he had two podium finishes and finished seventh in the points standings. His team built a new truck for 2006. He won his first Pro 4 race in the following year at Antelope Valley Fairgrounds. He finished sixth in season points with six finishes in the top five. In 2008, Huseman was tied for the points lead when CORR closed near the end of the schedule; he was awarded second place on a tie breaker. Huseman had two wins and Carl Renezeder had four.

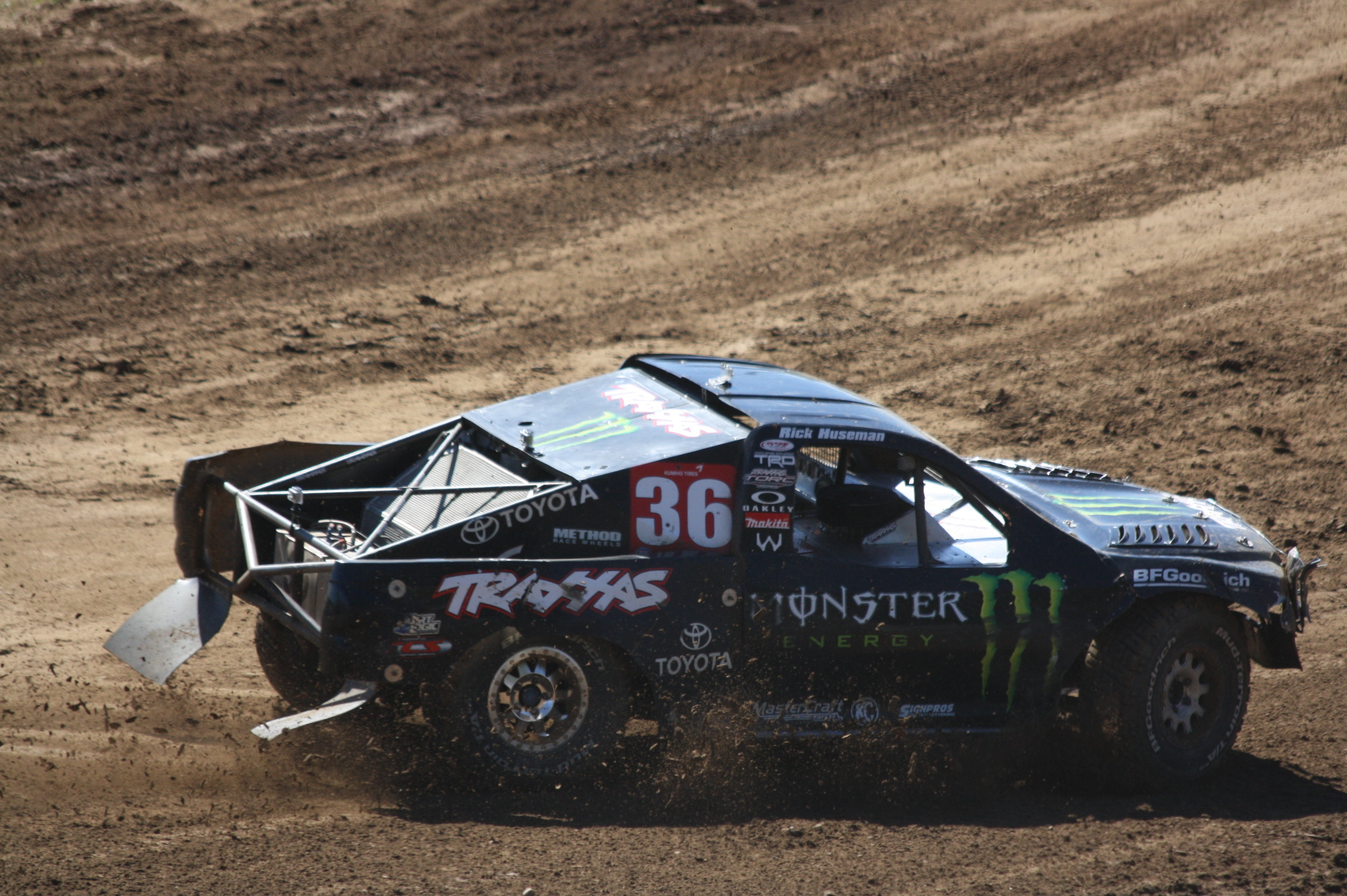
Huseman celebrating his 2011 Pro 4 World Championship race win at Crandon

Huseman joined the Traxxas TORC Series (TORC) in 2009 and he took on sponsorship by the series' title sponsor. He won five of the first six races that year, finishing the season with six wins and seven pole positions, and won the series' inaugural championship. Drivers in the series voted him the 2009 TORC Driver of the Year.

In the following year he competed in TORC and LOORS. He won 10 of 15 LOORRS events in 2010 which set a short course off-road racing record. He had 13 podium finishes with two 2nd-place finishes and one 3rd. Huseman was named the 2010 Driver of the Year by DirtSports Magazine. He finished second by three points in the TORC season standings. In that series he won five races, three 2nd places finishes and one 3rd. In 2011, Huseman decided to run in just the 2011 LOORS series. After winning the first four races, he added two more wins in rounds 9 and 10. These wins gave him 50 career victories. He was second in the 2011 LOORRS points when he died.

== Death ==
On October 16, 2011, Huseman and his brother Jeff were traveling home to California from a race in Las Vegas, Nevada when the small Beechcraft 33 Bonanza airplane began having engine trouble. Huseman had called his mother on his cell phone to tell her about the trouble. The aircraft crashed as pilot Daniel Hicks was attempting to make an emergency landing at the Barstow-Daggett Airport in the Mojave Desert and left Huseman and two other passengers dead.

Huseman's brother and chief mechanic Kevin Huseman did a ceremonial full-speed lap with his truck before the start of the following race at Las Vegas Motor Speedway. His truck number 36 has been retired by LOORRS in the Pro 4 class.
