= Adrian "Wildman" Cenni =

American stuntman

Adrian Cenni
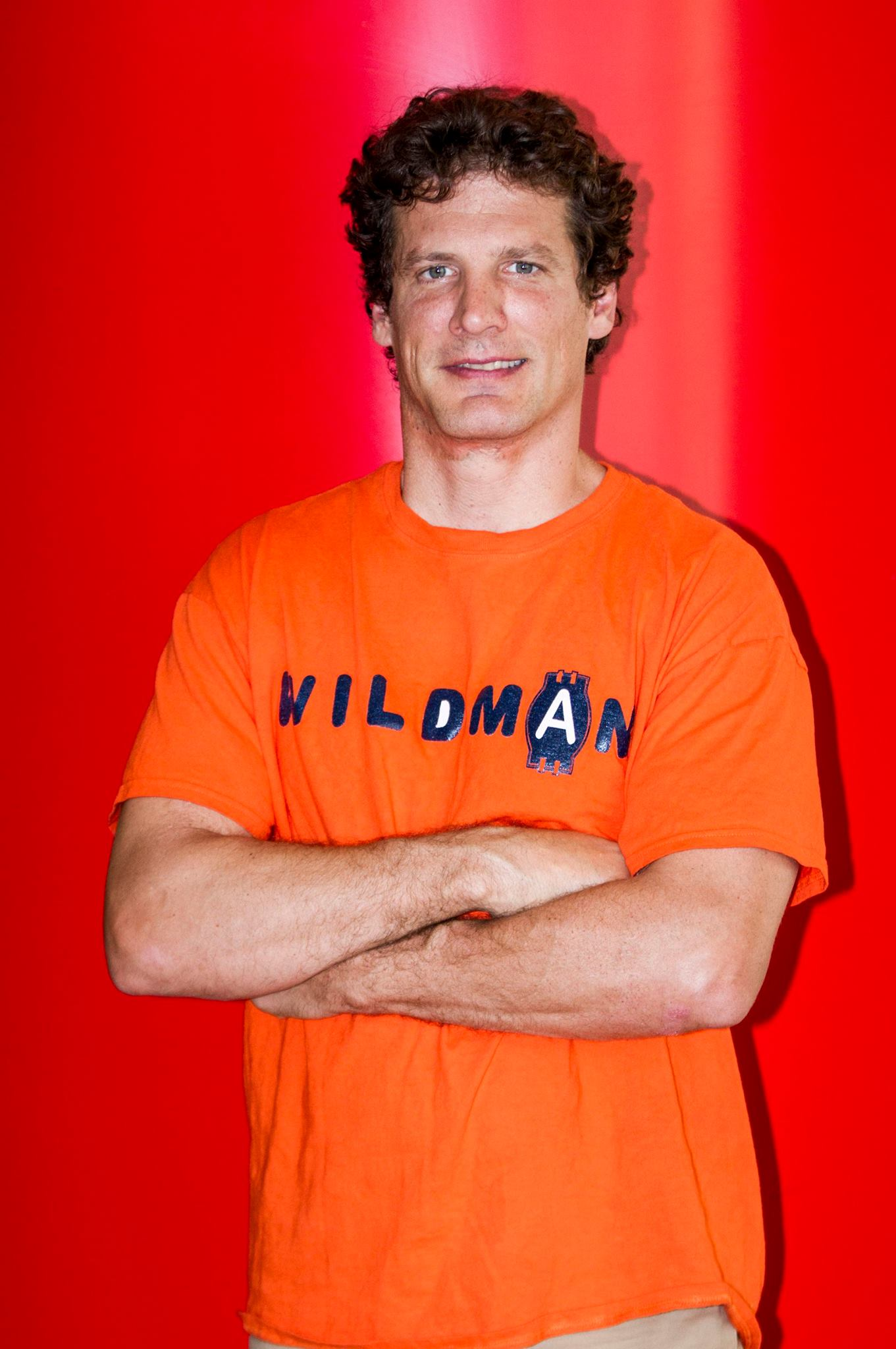
- Born: Adrian Cenni
- Education: University of Wisconsin–Madison
- Height: 6 ft 3 in (191 cm)
- Children: Maximus Cenni , Ariana Cenni

Championship Off-Road Racing career
- Debut season: 1999

Previous series
- 2013 2011–2013: Stadium Super Trucks; TORC: The Off-Road Championship

Championship titles
- 2011: Crandon International Off-Road Raceway World Champion
- Website: www.instagram.com/wildmancenni/

Adrian "Wildman" Cenni is a world record adventurer, professional off-road truck racer, and President/Founder of Atrium Staffing. Cenni is the first person to successfully land a true 360 degree barrel roll in a vehicle.

== Personal life ==
=== Childhood and early life ===
Cenni was born in Durban, South Africa. At the age of 14, he moved with his parents and brother to Wisconsin, United States. He was competitive in tennis and named Wisconsin's high school player of the year. He attended the University of Wisconsin–Madison and graduated with degrees in Economics and Psychology.

=== Business achievements ===
In 1995, Cenni founded Atrium Staffing which today employees over 30 thousand people per year with annual revenues of over 200 million dollars.

== Racing ==
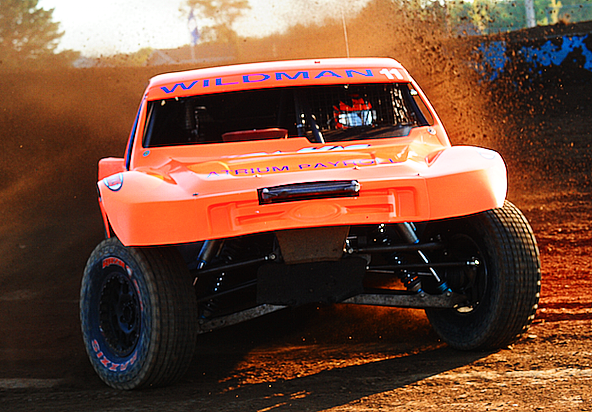
Cenni competing in the TORC Pro 4 class

After graduating from University of Wisconsin-Madison, Cenni moved to France in pursuit of getting into car racing. Cenni attended a Formula One drivers series program, where he finished sixth overall out of several hundred drivers and was the highest ranked American. In 1999, he started racing professionally in Lucas Oil Off-Road Racing (LOORS). He achieved victory in the Pro 4 category in his first season at Las Vegas, Nevada. Cenni has accumulated 17 victories to date, including winning the title of Crandon World Champion in 2011.

In 2012, Cenni participated in exhibition races for the newly created Stadium Super Trucks at Crandon. The series' inaugural season took place the following year, during which Cenni drove in the series' Super Buggy support class. He also ran the main trucks' Los Angeles Memorial Coliseum and Qualcomm Stadium rounds, where he finished tenth and seventh.

Cenni has also competed in the TORC: The Off-Road Championship.

=== Wall ride ===
Cenni is known as the Wildman for his unorthodox racing style. Most notable Wildman event was when he drove up and above the catch fencing in the 2008 Championship Off Road Racing Series in Primm, Nevada. He accidentally drove 25 ft up the catch fencing and 100 ft down and across the fencing. He accomplished this re-entering the track, while maintaining the lead of the race.

== Stunts ==
=== 360 degree barrel roll ===
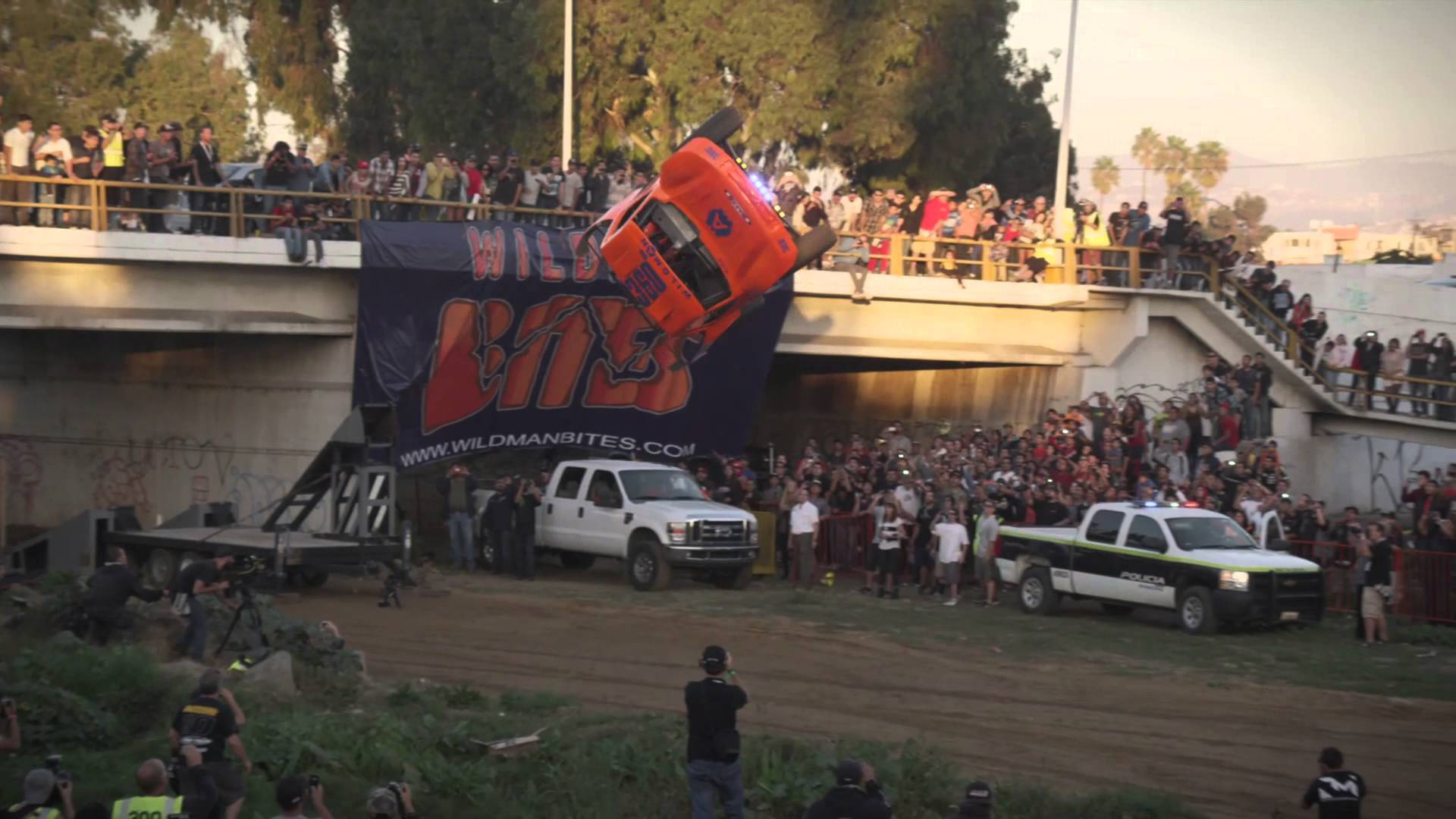
Cenni completing the first ever true 360 degree barrel roll

Cenni was the first person to complete a true flat take off to flat landing 360 degree barrel roll in a vehicle using a simple takeoff ramp. The stunt took over four years of practice and preparation due to injuries while practicing the stunt. The stunt has been performed multiple times in front of thousands of people.

=== Snowboarding in the Clouds ===
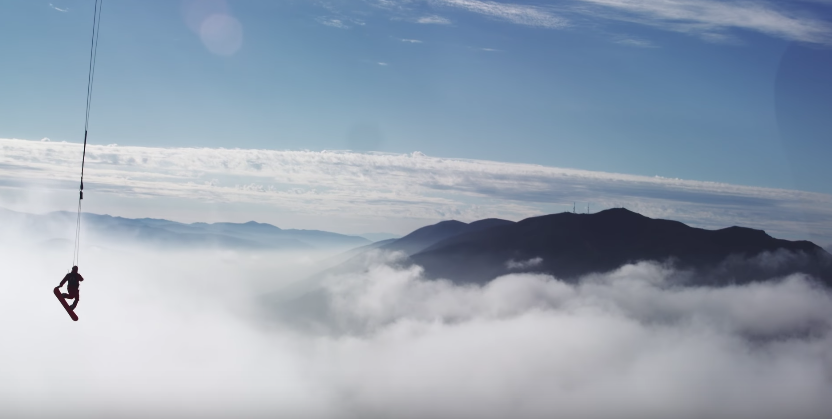
Snowboarding in the Clouds

Cenni released his second viral stunt via YouTube on September 23, 2016. The video went viral and was top 5 videos on the YouTube trending page. Cenni was strapped to a helicopter only by a long line and ascended 6000 feet into the air. Cenni was accelerated to speeds over 80 mph while trying capture the best possible camera shots of common snowboarding, grabs, and jumps. "The concept of Snowboarding in the Clouds is something everyone has dreamt about when sitting on an airplane or even just laying down on the ground looking up at the clouds. Carving up clouds 6,000 feet in the sky traveling at 80 mph was merely a dream and we took it and turned it into a reality," Cenni said.

== Filmography ==
Film

Year	Title	Role	Notes
2016	The Barrel Roll: A Four Year Journey	Himself	
