= Brian Deegan =

American motorcycle racer (born 1974)

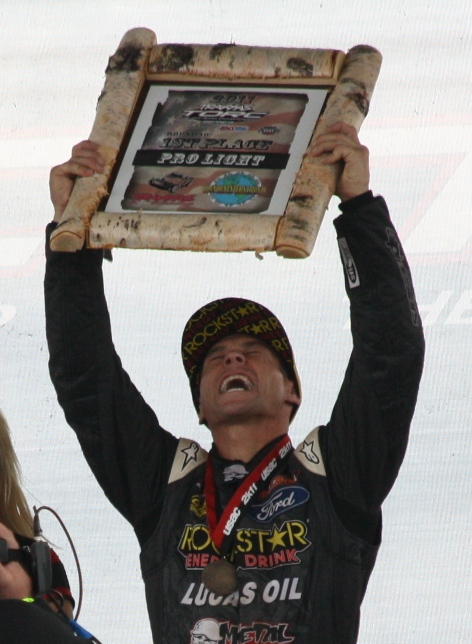
- Deegan in 2011 after winning the Pro Light class at the 2011 Off-Road Racing World Championships
- Born: May 9, 1974 (age 52); Omaha, Nebraska, U.S.
- Height: 5 ft 7 in (170 cm)
- Spouse: Marissa Deegan (m. 2003)
- Children: 3, including Hailie

Global Rallycross career
- Debut season: 2011
- Current team: Chip Ganassi Racing
- Car number: 38
- Former teams: Olsbergs MSE
- Starts: 42
- Wins: 2
- Podiums: 18
- Best finish: 2nd in 2012
- Finished last season: 10th
Medal record
Summer X Games
Representing United States
Gold medal – first place	2003 Los Angeles	Moto X Big Air
Gold medal – first place	2011 Los Angeles	RallyCross
Silver medal – second place	2006 Los Angeles	Moto X Step Up
Silver medal – second place	2010 Los Angeles	Rally Car Racing
Silver medal – second place	2010 Los Angeles	Rally Car Super Rally
Bronze medal – third place	1999 San Francisco	Moto X Freestyle
Bronze medal – third place	2000 San Francisco	Moto X Step Up
Bronze medal – third place	2000 San Francisco	Moto X Freestyle
Bronze medal – third place	2001 Philadelphia	Moto X Big Air
Bronze medal – third place	2002 Philadelphia	Moto X Big Air
Bronze medal – third place	2002 Philadelphia	Moto X Step Up
Bronze medal – third place	2003 Los Angeles	Moto X Freestyle
Bronze medal – third place	2012 Los Angeles	Rally Car Racing
Bronze medal – third place	2012 Los Angeles	Moto X Step Up
Winter X Games
Gold medal – first place	2002 Aspen	Moto X Big Air
Gold medal – first place	2005 Aspen	Moto X Best Trick
Gravity Games
Gold medal – first place	2000 Providence	Moto X Freestyle
Silver medal – second place	1999 Providence	Moto X Freestyle

Brian Deegan (born May 9, 1974) is an American professional freestyle motocross rider and racing driver.

Deegan was the first to land a 360 in a freestyle motocross competition. With a total of 16 X Games medals across multiple disciplines, he is one of the most decorated athletes in X Games history, with 12 in motocross and 4 in rally car racing.

A co-founder of the Metal Mulisha clothing line, Deegan is one of the most recognizable names in action sports. In the 2010s, Deegan transitioned to rallycross in the Global Rallycross Championship and off-road trucks in the Lucas Oil Off Road Racing Championship series. In 2010, Deegan earned double silver in Rally Car Racing and RallyCross. In 2011, he took RallyCross gold and came back to earn bronze in 2012.

== Racing career ==
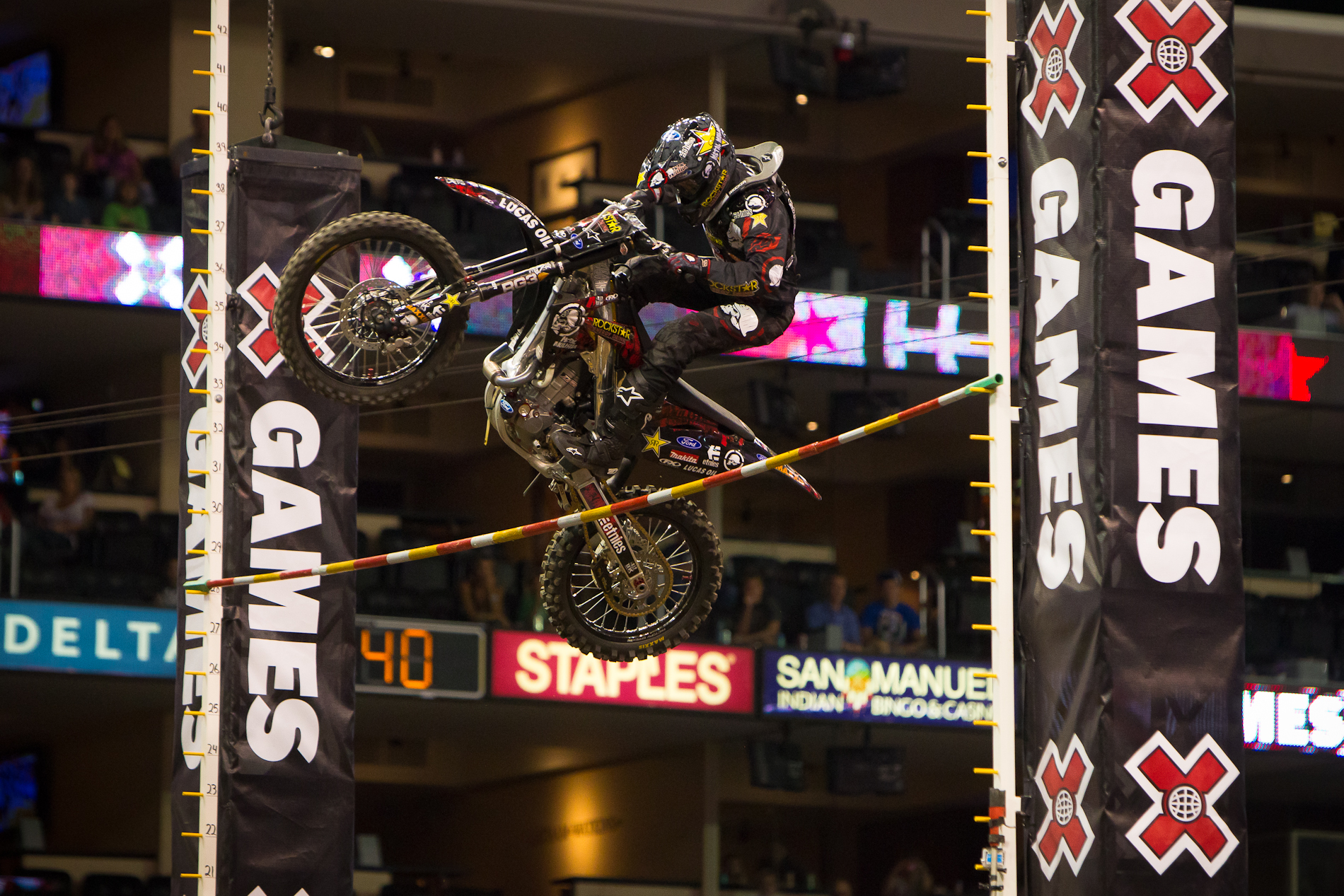
Deegan at X Games 17 in Los Angeles

Deegan became a professional supercross rider with Team Moto XXX at age 17. In 1997 at the Los Angeles Memorial Coliseum, Deegan won the 125cc main and ghost rode his bike across the finish line.

In 2004, at the Winter X Games, Deegan crashed while attempting a twisting backflip 360 over a 100 ft (30 m) jump, landing on hard-packed snow and ice and breaking his femur and both wrists. He returned 6 months later to place fourth at the 2004 Summer X Games.

Switching to four wheels in 2009, Deegan ventured into short course off-road racing in the Lucas Oil Off Road Racing Series' Unlimited Lites division. He ultimately won the championship over more experienced off-road drivers.

At the 2010 X Games, Deegan competed in the Rally Car event at the Los Angeles Memorial Coliseum. He finished second behind Tanner Foust after making a wrong turn during the race. He also competed in Rally Car Super Rally, again finishing second behind Tanner Foust.

At X Games XVII, Deegan won gold in RallyCross.

In 2011, Deegan won the World Championship race at Crandon International Off-Road Raceway in the Traxxas TORC Series. He also won the Pro Lite Unlimited and Pro 2 class championships in the Lucas Oil Off Road Racing Series. In addition, he represented the United States with teammate Travis Pastrana in the Race of Champions (ROC) competition held at the Esprit Arena in Düsseldorf, Germany.

In 2012, Deegan debuted the Metal Mulisha Monster truck. Todd LeDuc officially debuted it at Reliant Stadium in Houston, Texas in January 2012. Deegan drove the truck at Chase Field in Phoenix, Arizona. Deegan also won his second championship in the Pro 2 class of the Lucas Oil Off Road Racing Series.

Deegan raced an OlsbergsMSE Ford Fiesta in the Global RallyCross Championship, earning runner-up in 2012, fourth in 2013 and 12th in 2014. He also continued his Lucas Oil Off Road Racing Series career, winning the Pro Light Unlimited championship in 2013 and the Pro 2 championship in 2014. In 2015, Deegan was hired by Chip Ganassi Racing to compete in seven Global Rallycross Championship races in an M-Sport Fiesta along with former professional motocross rider Jeff Ward.

== Media appearances ==
During a 2005 taping of MTV's Viva La Bam, Deegan under-rotated a backflip and suffered a strong impact from the handle bars in his midsection, almost losing his life. He lost a kidney, lacerated his spleen, and lost a significant amount of blood. He now has a long scar down his stomach, that he calls his "zipper", spanning almost his entire abdomen, as a result of the accident. While the accident was cut out of the show, Bam Margera dedicated the episode to Brian. Deegan was interviewed and detaiӀed his scar on episode 16 of MTV's Scarred.

In 2006, Deegan and Berkela films released a film entitled Disposable Hero that follows him through the struggles and rewards that accompany the freestyle motocross sport and lifestyle. Jesse James, Ronnie Faisst, Jeremy Stenberg, Cameron Steele, Chris Ackerman, Nate Adams, and Seth Enslow are a few of the featured cast that talk about Deegan and his life's journeys. The film aired on Spike TV on December 5, 2007.

Deegan performed stunts in the movie Fantastic Four.

Deegan has been on the cover of Transworld MX and Racer X magazines and has been featured multiple times in FHM magazine.

Deegan is in the video game Freekstyle for Game Boy Advance, GameCube, and PlayStation 2. He also appears in the 2000 game Supercross for the PlayStation.

In 2018, Deegan was the subject of the documentary Blood Line: The Life and Times of Brian Deegan.

== Other ventures ==
In addition to supporting riders, the Metal Mulisha has a clothing line and other related merchandise. Deegan also has a toy line called Heavy Hitters distributed in retail locations such as Walmart. Most recently he teamed up with Illektron to create Battlez FMX, a collectible card and dice game featuring Deegan, Todd Potter and Jeremy Lusk.

Deegan is the former owner of the FMX park, the Compound, which he later sold to Nate Adams. At the 2007 X Games, he stated that he sometimes regrets selling it.

== Personal life ==
He has been married to Marissa Deegan since 2003. Together, they have three children: Hailie, who currently competes full-time in the ARCA Menards Series West driving for Bill McAnally Racing; Haiden, who was recently signed to Monster Energy Star Yamaha Racing as an amateur/pro rider; and Hudson, who competes in youth motocross.

Deegan became a born-again Christian after a near-fatal crash in 2005.

== X Games competition history ==
GOLD (4) SILVER (3) BRONZE (9)
Year	X Games	Events	Rank	Medal
1999	Summer X Games V	Moto X Freestyle	3rd	Bronze medal
2000	Summer X Games VI	Moto X Step Up	3rd	Bronze medal
2000	Summer X Games VI	Moto X Freestyle	3rd	Bronze medal
2001	Winter X Games V	Moto X Big Air	4th	
2001	Summer X Games VII	Moto X Freestyle	7th	
2001	Summer X Games VII	Moto X Step Up	7th	
2001	Summer X Games VII	Moto X Big Air	3rd	Bronze medal
2002	Winter X Games VI	Moto X Big Air	1st	Gold medal
2002	Summer X Games VIII	Moto X Freestyle	10th	
2002	Summer X Games VIII	Moto X Step Up	3rd	Bronze medal
2002	Summer X Games VIII	Moto X Big Air	3rd	Bronze medal
2003	Winter X Games VII	Moto X Big Air	Injured	
2003	Summer X Games IX	Moto X Step Up	10th	
2003	Summer X Games IX	Moto X Freestyle	3rd	Bronze medal
2003	Summer X Games IX	Moto X Big Air	1st	Gold medal
2004	Winter X Games VIII	Moto X Best Trick	18th	
2004	Summer X Games X	Moto X Best Trick	4th	
2004	Summer X Games X	Moto X Step Up	4th	
2004	Summer X Games X	Moto X Freestyle	9th	
2005	Winter X Games IX	Moto X Best Trick	1st	Gold medal
2005	Summer X Games XI	Moto X Step Up	3rd	
2006	Winter X Games X	Moto X Best Trick	5th	
2006	Summer X Games XII	Moto X Best Trick	8th	
2006	Summer X Games XII	Moto X Step Up	2nd	Silver medal
2007	Summer X Games XIII	Moto X Best Trick	8th	
2007	Summer X Games XIII	Moto X Step Up	2nd	
2008	Summer X Games XIV	Moto X Step Up	3rd	
2009	Summer X Games XV	Moto X Step Up	6th	
2009	Summer X Games XV	Rally Car Racing	4th	
2010	Summer X Games XVI	Rally Car Racing	2nd	Silver medal
2010	Summer X Games XVI	Rally Car Super Rally	2nd	Silver medal
2011	Summer X Games XVII	Moto X Step Up	4th	
2011	Summer X Games XVII	RallyCross	1st	Gold medal
2012	Summer X Games XVIII	Moto X Step Up	3rd	Bronze medal
2012	Summer X Games XVIII	RallyCross	3rd	Bronze medal
2013	X Games Foz do Iguaçu 2013	RallyCross	5th	
2013	X Games Munich 2013	Moto X Step Up	4th	
2013	X Games Munich 2013	RallyCross	10th	
2013	X Games Los Angeles 2013	RallyCross	7th	
2014	X Games Austin 2014	RallyCross	8th	
2015	X Games Austin 2015	RallyCross	4th	

== Gravity Games ==
Year	GRAVITY GAMES	LOCATION	Events	Rank	Medal
1999	Gravity Games I	Providence, RI	Moto X Freestyle	2nd	Silver medal
2000	Gravity Games II	Providence, RI	Moto X Freestyle	1st	Gold medal
2001	Gravity Games III	Providence, RI	Moto X Freestyle	8th	

== Career highlights ==
- 1997 Los Angeles Supercross 125cc – 1st place
- 1999 World Freestyle Champ
- 2000 Air MX Champ
- 2000 Bluetorch Ride and Slide FMX Champ
- At the 2002 Winter X Games, Deegan pulled off the Mandatory Suicide (Super Can to Side Saddle Lander), its named after his favorite band Slayer and wins his first ever Winter X Games Gold medal.
- 2003 Featured Rider on Tony Hawk tour
- 2003 EXPN Rider of the year nominee
- First to land a 360 in an FMX competition
- 2004 ESPY award nominee
- At the 2004 Winter X Games, Deegan tried to pull off the 360 over the 90-foot ice gap, but broke both of his wrists, he has 7 screws and 1 steel plate in his left femur and blacked out from the pain.
- Holds the 2nd most medals in FMX X Games history: 12 medals
- 2004 ESPN top 100 athlete of all sports
- 2007 Winner Best Biography X Dance Action Sports Film Festival for Brian Deegan: Disposable Hero
- 2009 Awarded The Lifetime Achievement Award At The Transworld Motocross Awards In Las Vegas.
- 1 gold and 5 medals at the X Games rally events.
- 2nd at the 2012 Global RallyCross Championship.
- 4th at the 2013 Global RallyCross Championship.
- 2009, 2011 and 2013 Lucas Oil Off Road Racing Series Pro Lite Unlimited champion
- 2011, 2012 and 2014 Lucas Oil Off Road Racing Series Pro 2 Unlimited champion
- 2011 World Championship race winner in the Pro Light truck class
- 2022, 2026 Freedom 500 race winner at the Freedom Factory

== Racing record ==
=== Complete Global RallyCross Championship results ===
==== Supercar ====
Year	Entrant	Car	1	2	3	4	5	6	7	8	9	10	11	12	GRC	Points
2011	Olsbergs MSE	Ford Fiesta	IRW1	IRW2	SEA1	SEA2	PIK1; 3	PIK2; 8	LA1; 10	LA2; 1					9th	54
2012	Olsbergs MSE	Ford Fiesta	CHA; 16	TEX; 3	LA; 3	LOU; 3	LV; 2	LVC; 2							2nd	84
2013	Olsbergs MSE	Ford Fiesta ST	BRA; 5	MUN1; 7	MUN2; 9	LOU; 3	BRI; 3	IRW; 7	ATL; 6	CHA; 2	LV; 13				4th	106
2014	Rockstar Energy Drink	Ford Fiesta ST	BAR; 3	AUS; 8	DC	NY	CHA; 9	DAY	LA1	LA2	SEA; 3	LV; 9			12th	140
2015	Chip Ganassi Racing	Ford Fiesta ST	FTA	DAY1	DAY2	MCAS; 10	DET1; 4	DET2; 5	DC	LA1; 6	LA2; 2	BAR1; 6	BAR2; 9	LV; 5	10th	229
2016	Chip Ganassi Racing	Ford Fiesta ST	PHO1; 3	PHO2; 6	DAL; 7	DAY1; 2	DAY2; 5	MCAS1; 2	MCAS2^{†}	DC; 4	AC; 3	SEA; 7	LA1; 4	LA2; 1	3rd	473

^{†}Race cancelled.
