= Southern Nevada Off Road Enthusiasts =

Desert car racing group in Nevada, USA

Southern Nevada Off Road Enthusiasts (SNORE) is an American club-style desert racing organization based in Las Vegas, Nevada.

Established in 1969 as a club of enthusiasts, it has grown into a major desert motorsports racing event organizer in the Southwest United States.

In 2010, SNORE announced the revival of the Mint 400 off-road race, which was subsequently sold to Mad Media and managed by Best in the Desert under a 2-year contract.
