= Lucas Oil Off Road Racing Series =

American off-road racing series (2009–2020)

- Sport: Short course off-road racing
- Jurisdiction: United States; Mexico
- Abbreviation: LOORRS
- Founded: 2009
- Closure date: 2020

The Lucas Oil Off Road Racing Series, also known as LOORRS, was a short course off-road racing series in the United States and Mexico. Following the bankruptcy of the CORR series in 2008, Lucas Oil founded LOORRS in 2009, featuring racing events in Arizona, California, Nevada, Missouri, as well as Ensenada, Baja California, Mexico. In 2020, the series was discontinued due to uncertainty stemming from the COVID-19 pandemic.

== History ==
There were two large sanctioning bodies in short course off-road racing for 2008: CORR and WSORR. CORR had been sanctioning events on the West Coast and WSORR had sanctioned Midwestern events. CORR closed before the end of the 2008 season and canceled its final two racing weekends. LOORRS took over the sanctioning of most of the West Coast events, and TORC: The Off-Road Championship, took over most of the Midwestern events.

The LOORRS series was founded for the 2009 season by Lucas Oil and its head Forrest Lucas. Carl Renezeder made short course off-road racing history in 2009 when he won the Unlimited 2 and Unlimited 4 class to become the first driver to win seven national championships.

In December 2012, LOORRS announced that Ritchie Lewis would be taking over as the series' director. He announced the 2013 series schedule; it would continue racing at most of the same tracks. He also announced that Lucas would be building tracks at San Angelo, Texas and Lucas Oil Speedway to be used in 2014.

In December 2018, the series announced plans to create a historic and long-awaited short course unification race to take place in June 2019 at Lucas Oil Speedway. Regular LOORRS Racers competing against the Lucas Oil Midwest Short Course League Racers with drivers from each series would be able to win points for their respective championships. Unfortunately an untimely tornado wreaked havoc in the area and severely damaged the track forcing official to cancel the event.

In June 2020, LOORRS cancelled the Pro 4 series races for the 2020 season as team participation was anticipated to be low. Rockstar Energy Drink didn't renew their sponsorship of the series or for two top Pro 4 teams of Rob MacCachren and R.J. Anderson. Kyle LeDuc decided to participate only in the Midwestern series.

On November 12, 2020 Lucas Oil announced it would effectively fold the series due to the ongoing COVID-19 pandemic and uncertainty of another shutdown the following year.

== Classes ==
The Lucas Oil Off Road Racing Series had the following classes:

- Pro 4 Unlimited: Full-sized 4-wheel-drive race truck, over 700 hp.
- Pro 2 Unlimited: Full-sized 2-wheel-drive race truck, over 700 hp.
- Pro Lite Unlimited: Mid-sized 2-wheel-drive race truck built on a standardized chassis, over 450 hp.
- Pro Buggy: Open-wheel buggies with up to 2000 cc motors (dependent on design and manufacturer), 210 hp.
- Production Turbo UTV: Stock 100 cc 2 seat UTV, 130-160 hp.
- Production 1000 UTV: Stock 100 cc 2 seat UTV, 80-110 hp.
- Modified Kart: Advanced kart class utilizing 250 cc or 450 cc 48 hp motorcycle motors; for kids ages 10–15.
- Junior 2 Kart: Intermediate spec kart class utilizing the Honda GX390 390 cc 12 hp motor; for kids ages 8–15.
- Junior 1 Kart: Beginner spec kart class utilizing the Subaru EX27 266 cc 9 hp motor; for kids ages 8–15.
- Limited Buggy: Open-wheel buggies with Type 1 1600 cc VW engines.
- Unlimited UTV: Heavily modified UTV utilizing up to 1000 cc engines.
- SR1 UTV: Heavily modified Yamaha Rhino or Kawasaki Teryx spec class utilizing the Yamaha R1 or Kawasaki ZX-10 1000 cc street bike motor.
- SuperLite: Spec 2-wheel-drive truck regulated by the SuperLite Championship Series.

== Champions ==
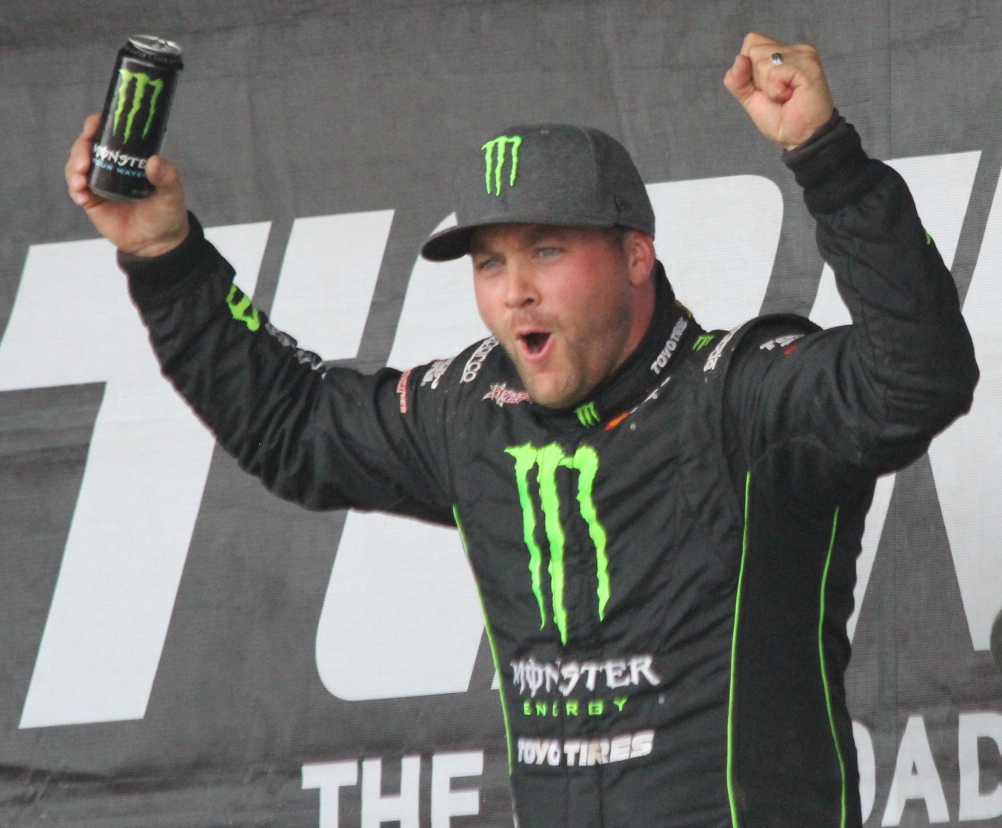
2012, 2014, 2015, 2016, 2017, and 2019 Pro 4 champion Kyle LeDuc

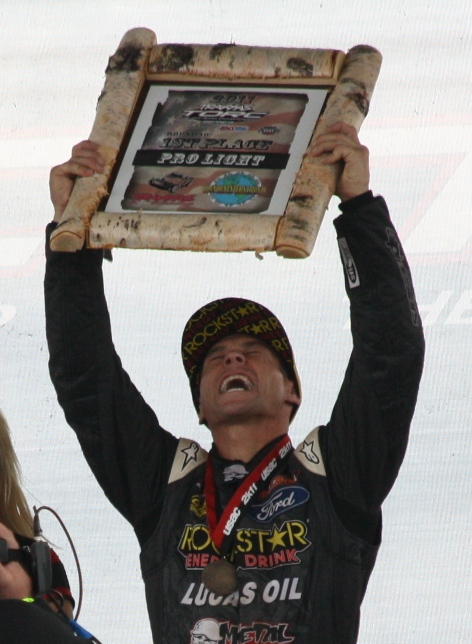
2012, 2013, and 2014 Pro 2 champion Brian Deegan

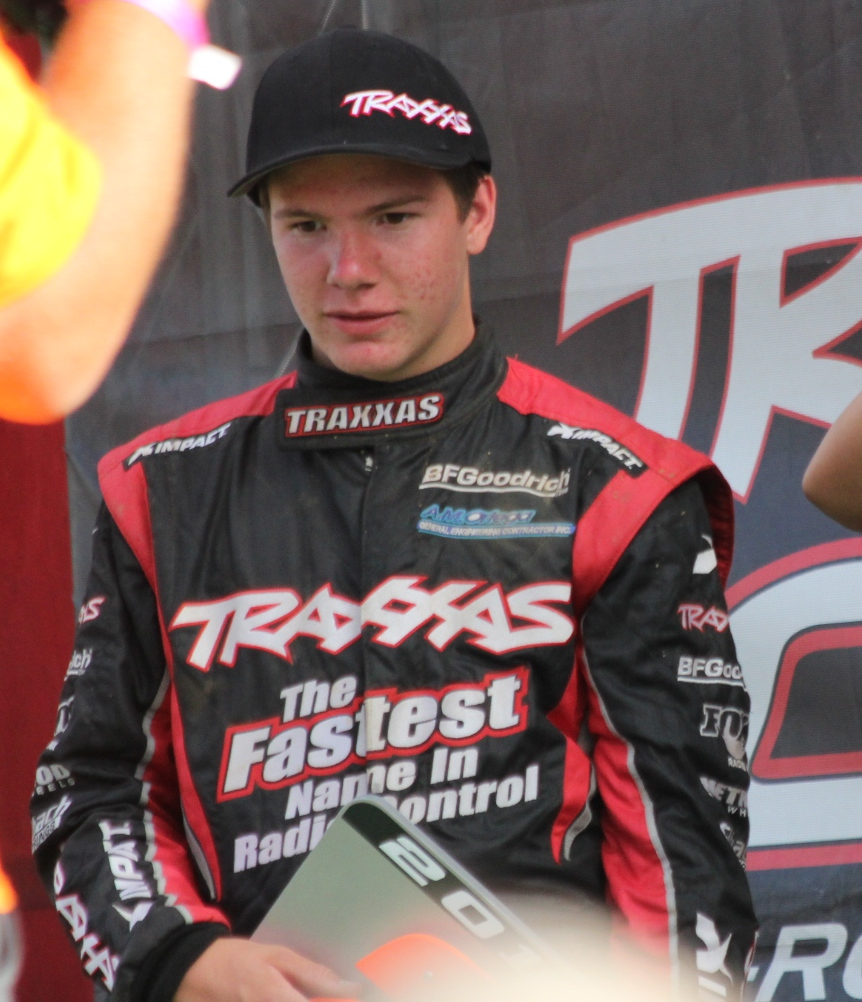
Sheldon Creed

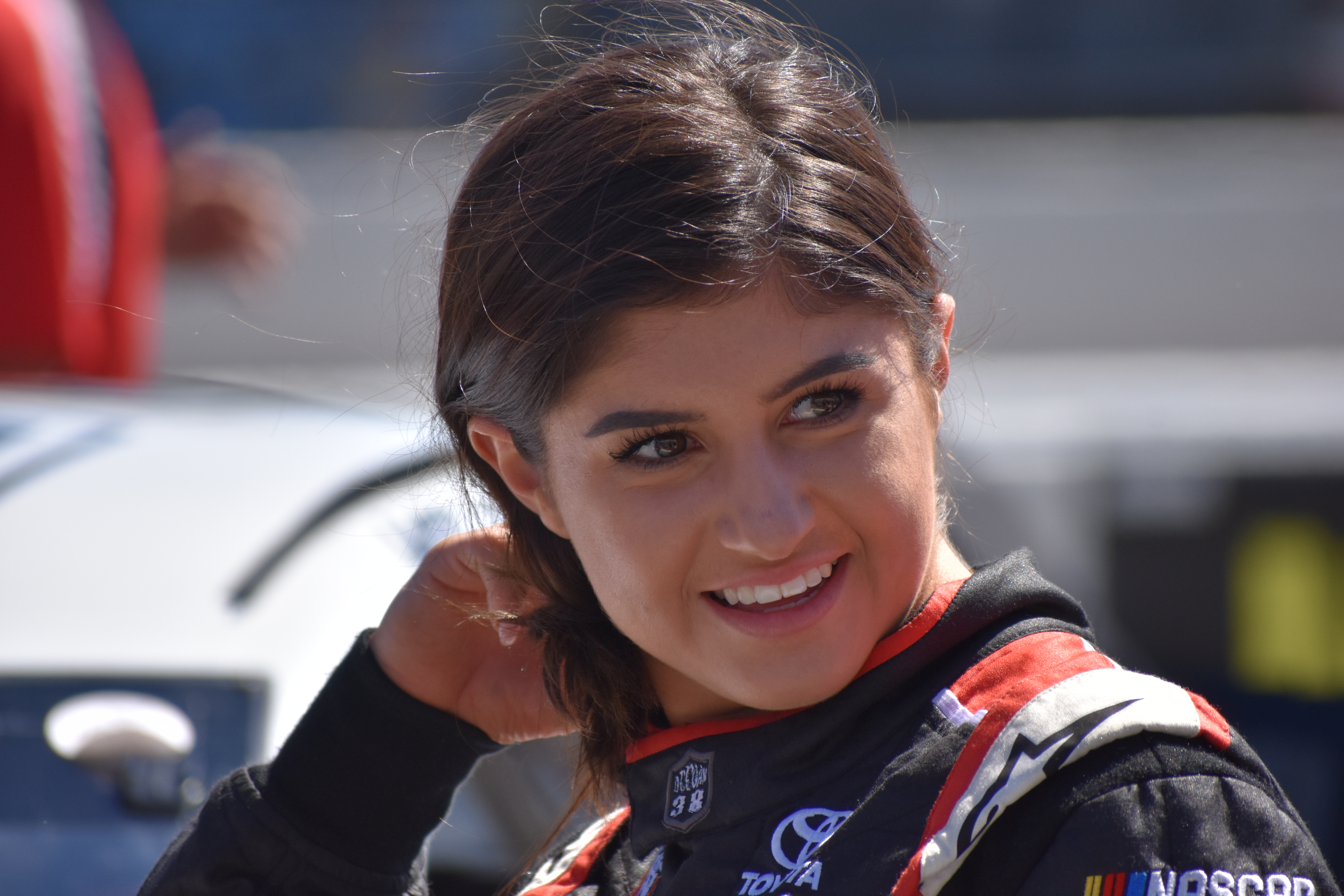
2016 The first female Modified Kart Champion Hailie Deegan

=== Pro 4 ===
- 2019 Kyle LeDuc
- 2018 RJ Anderson
- 2017 Kyle LeDuc
- 2016 Kyle LeDuc
- 2015 Kyle LeDuc
- 2014 Kyle LeDuc
- 2013 Carl Renezeder
- 2012 Kyle LeDuc
- 2011 Carl Renezeder
- 2010 Rick Huseman
- 2009 Carl Renezeder

=== Pro 2 ===
- 2020 Jerett Brooks
- 2019 Jerett Brooks
- 2018 Rob MacCachren
- 2017 Jeremy McGrath
- 2016 Rob MacCachren
- 2015 Rob MacCachren
- 2014 Brian Deegan
- 2013 Rob MacCachren
- 2012 Brian Deegan
- 2011 Brian Deegan
- 2010 Rob MacCachren
- 2009 Carl Renezeder

=== Pro Lite Unlimited ===
- 2020 Brock Heger
- 2019 Ryan Beat
- 2018 Ryan Beat
- 2017 Jerett Brooks
- 2016 Jerett Brooks
- 2015 RJ Anderson
- 2014 Sheldon Creed
- 2013 Brian Deegan
- 2012 R.J. Anderson
- 2011 Brian Deegan
- 2010 Marty Hart
- 2009 Brian Deegan

=== Pro Buggy ===
- 2020 Eliott Watson
- 2019 Eliott Watson
- 2018 Darren Hardesty
- 2017 Darren Hardesty
- 2016 Darren Hardesty
- 2015 Garrett George
- 2014 Chad George
- 2013 Steven Greinke
- 2012 Steven Greinke
- 2011 Mike Porter
- 2010 Cameron Steele
- 2009 Chuck Cheek

=== Modified Karts ===
- 2020 Connor Barry – Mod Kids USA
- 2019 Mason Prater – Mod Kids USA
- 2018 Brody Eggleston – Mod Kids USA
- 2017 Trey D. Gibbs – Mod Kids USA
- 2016 Hailie Deegan
- 2015 Christopher Polvoorde
- 2014 Brock Heger
- 2013 Myles Cheek
- 2012 Myles Cheek
- 2011 Mitchell DeJong
- 2010 Mitchell DeJong
- 2009 Sheldon Creed
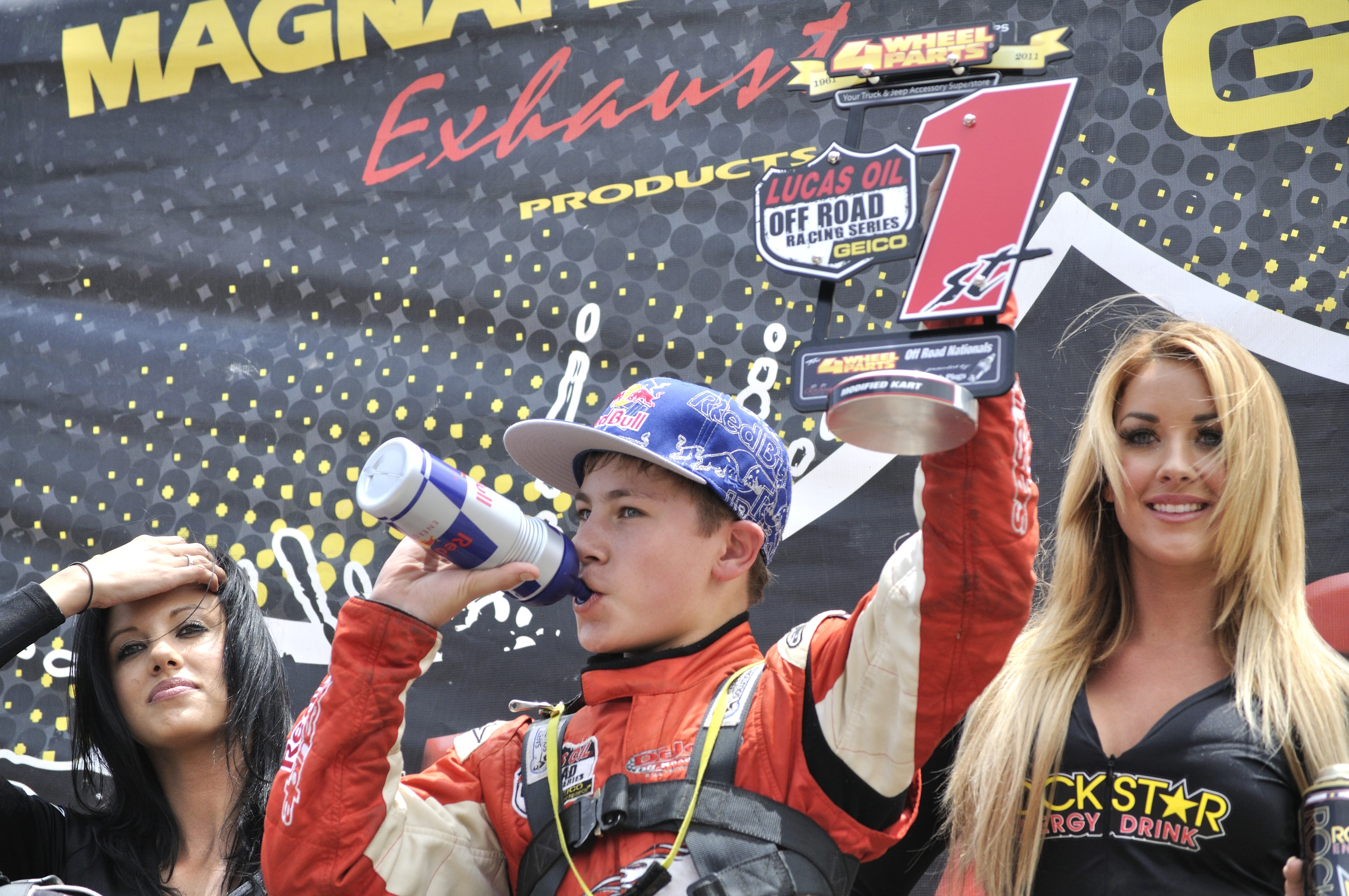
  Mitchell deJong, 1st ever Back-to-Back Champion in the Lucas Oil Off Road Racing Championship

=== Junior 2 Karts ===
- 2020 Brodie Martin
- 2019 Broedy Graham
- 2018 Connor Barry - Mod Kids USA
- 2017 Megan Mitchell
- 2015 Cole Keatts
- 2014 Dylan Plemons
- 2013 Hailie Deegan
- 2012 Dylan Winbury
- 2011 Myles Cheek
- 2010 Sheldon Creed
- 2009 Dustin Grabowski

=== Junior 1 Karts ===
- 2018 Jake Bollman
- 2015 Kali Kinsman
- 2014 Mason Prater
- 2013 Ricky Gutierrez
- 2012 Conner McMullen
- 2011 Broc Dickerson
- 2010 Brock Heger
- 2009 Sheldon Creed

=== Production 1000 UTV ===
- 2020 Robert VanBeekum
- 2019 Robert Stout
- 2018 Brock Heger
- 2017 Brock Heger

=== Turbo UTV ===
- 2020 Corry Weller
- 2019 Robert VanBeekum
- 2018 Corry Weller

=== RZR 170 ===
- 2020 TJ Siewers
- 2019 George Llamosas

=== Unlimited UTV ===
- 2011 RJ Anderson
- 2010 Chad George
- 2009 Chad George

=== Super Lite ===
- 2012 Sheldon Creed
- 2011 Chad George
- 2010 Jeremy Stenberg
- 2009 John Harrah

=== Limited Buggy ===
- 2012 John Fitzgerald
- 2011 Curt Geer
- 2010 Justin Smith
- 2009 Bruce Fraley

=== SR1 UTV ===
- 2011 Corry Weller
- 2010 Tyler Herzog

=== Modified UTV ===
- 2009 Dan Kelly

=== Limited UTV ===
- 2009 Hans Waage

== Tracks ==
The series has hosted race weekends at the following tracks:

- Wild Horse Motorsports Park - Chandler, Arizona (2010–2020)
- Glen Helen Raceway - San Bernardino, California (2010–2020)
- Lake Elsinore Motorsports Complex - Lake Elsinore, California (2009, 2012–2016)
- Las Vegas Motor Speedway - Las Vegas, Nevada (2010–2015)
- Miller Motorsports Park - Tooele, Utah (2010–2018)
- Primm Valley Motorsports Complex - Primm, Nevada (2009)
- Speedworld Off Road Park - Surprise, Arizona (2009–2012)
- Wild West Motorsports Park - Sparks, Nevada (2012–2019)
- Baja International Short Course at Estero Beach - Ensenada, Baja California (2015-2019)
- Lucas Oil Speedway - Wheatland, Missouri (2017–2020)

== Television coverage ==
For the 2015 season, the Lucas Oil Off Road Racing Series was aired on several different networks with 8 confirmed one-hour episodes in HD on CBS and 32 confirmed HD episodes on both CBS Sports Network and MavTV.
