= Carl Renezeder =

American off-road racer

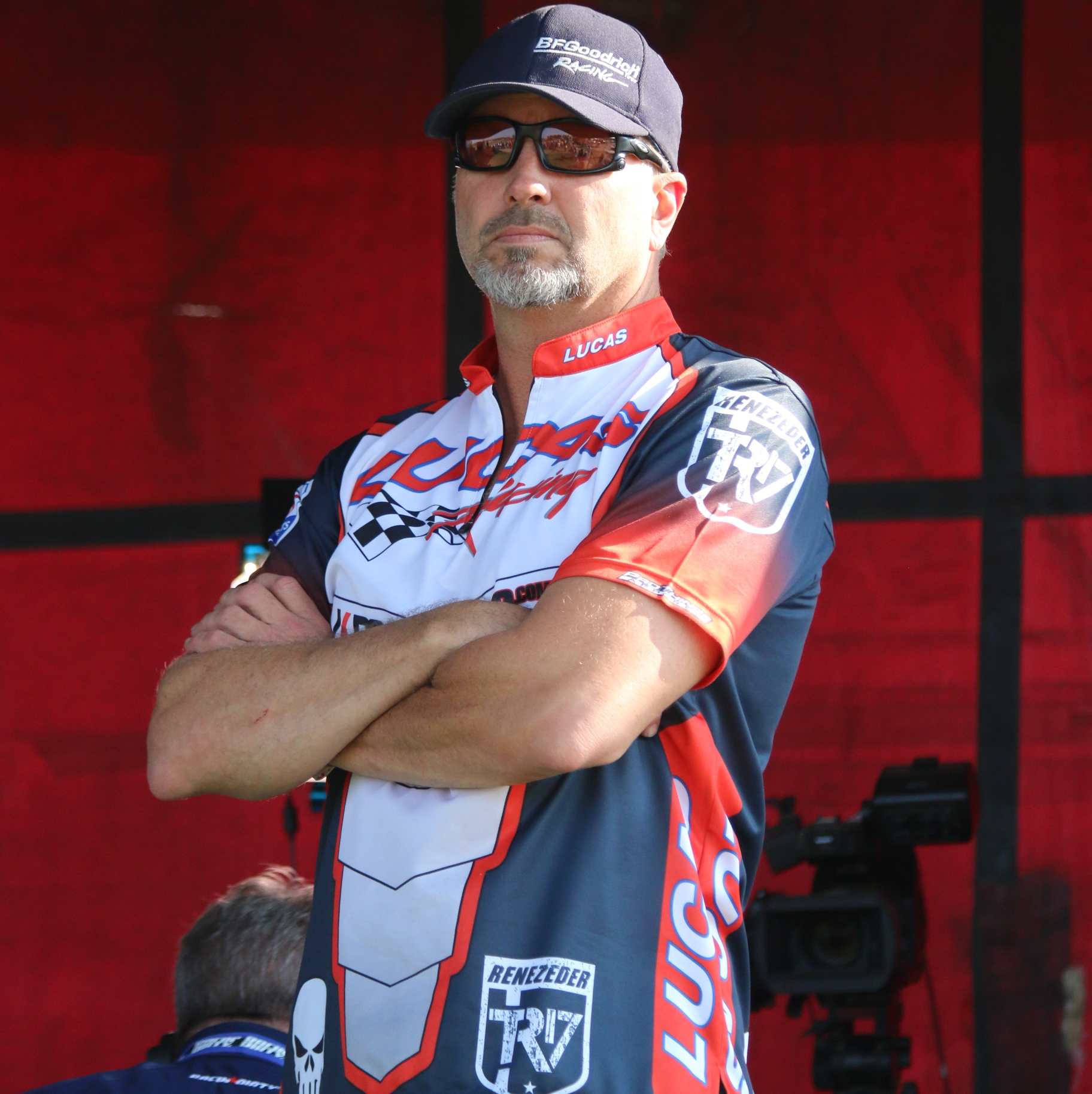
- Renezeder during his 2017 retirement season
- Nationality: United States
- Born: April 16, 1964 (age 62) Montebello, California, U.S.

Lucas Oil Off Road Racing Series Unlimited-2, Unlimited-4 career
- Debut season: 1999
- Current team: Team Renezeder
- Car number: 17
- Wins: 125
- Best finish: 1st in 2017

Previous series
- 2008, 2007, 2003 (Pro-4) 2006, 2005 (Pro-2): Championship Off-Road Racing

Championship titles
- 2003, 2007, 2008 CORR Pro 4; 2005, 2006 CORR Pro 2; 2009 LOORS Pro 2; 2009, 2011, 2013 LOORS Pro 4

Carl Renezeder (born April 16, 1964) is a retired American off-road racer for Team Renezeder Racing. As of the end of the 2016 season, Renezeder has won 125 short course national events he has competed in Lucas Oil Off Road Racing (LOORR), Championship Off-Road Racing (CORR), and World Series of Off Road Racing (WSORR). He has won nine short course off-road racing championships. Renezeder was also the first driver in short-course off-road racing history to win championships in both two wheel drive and four wheel drive trophy trucks in the same season when he won the 2009 Unlimited 2 and Unlimited 4 divisions in LOORRS.

== Background ==
Renezeder's hometown is Laguna Beach, California. he graduated from UCLA in 1987.

== Racing career ==
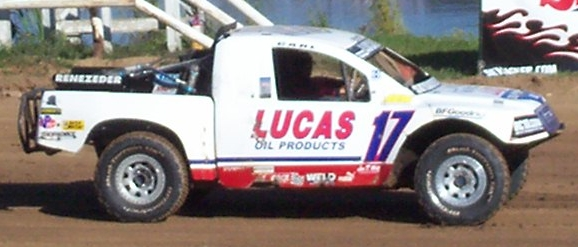
Renezeder at the 2008 Borg-Warner World Championship at Crandon.

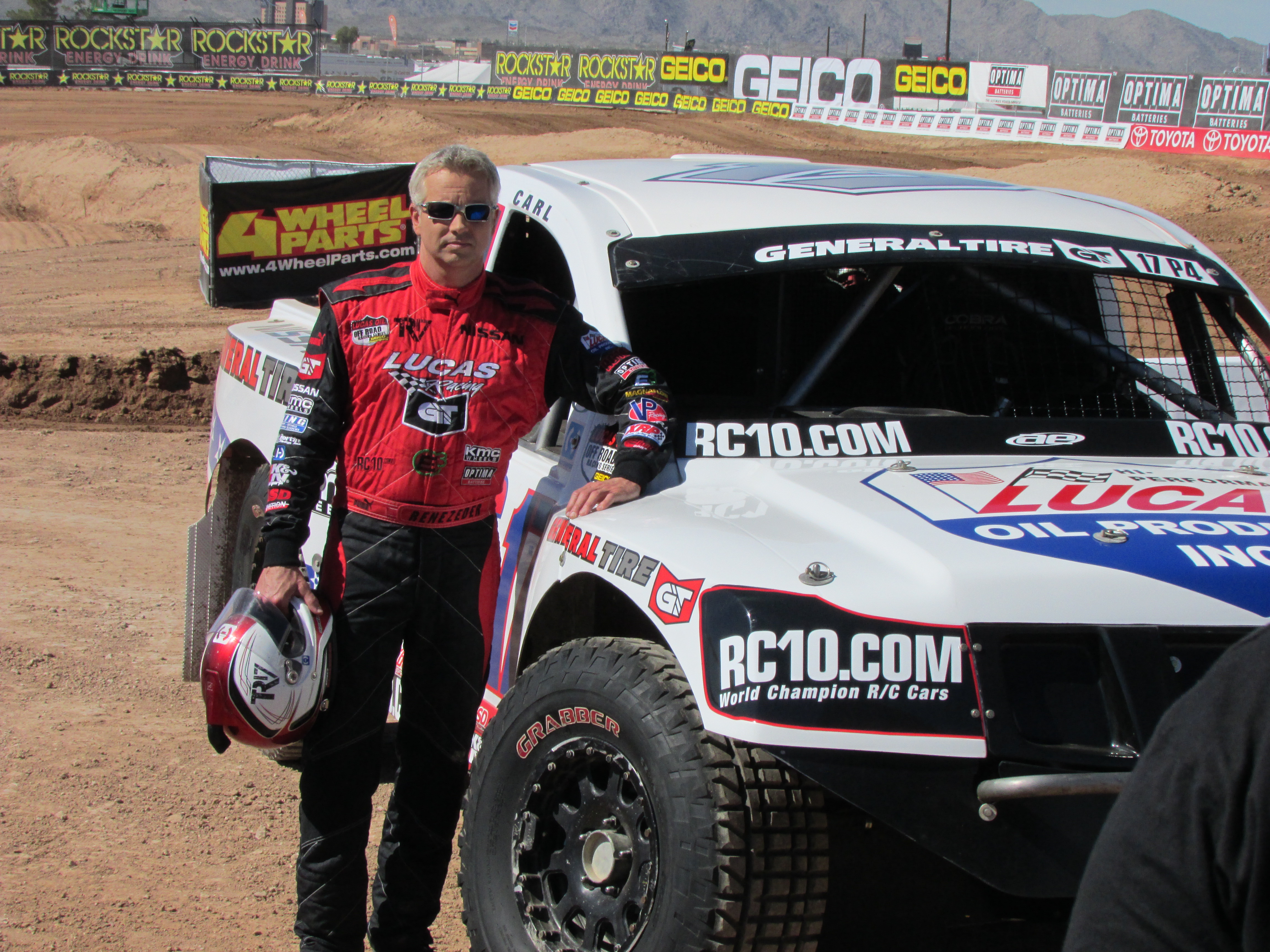
Renezeder at Firebird in 2013

Renezeder raced in CORR between 1994 and 2002, winning nine events. He was part of the Baja 1000 Class 1 winning team in 1994.

In 2003, he won the CORR Pro-4 division points trophy. He had eight wins that season, including Borg-Warner World Championship at Crandon. He also finished second in the Pro-2 points. Renezeder returned to both series in 2004, winning eight races to finish second in Pro-4 and third in Pro-2. His season highlight was winning the Governor's Cup/Brush Run at Crandon.

Renezeder won the 2005 Pro-2 CORR championship and finished second in Pro-4 points. He won nine races that season, including the Nissan Nationals in Pro-4.

In 2006, he was named Dirt Sports Magazine’s "2006 Driver of the Year". He won CORR's Pro-2 class after winning six events. In Pro-4, Renezeder won 4 races to finish second in season points. At Laughlin, he won the Laughlin Leap by jumping his trophy truck 159 feet (48 m) before finishing second in the SCORE Laughlin Desert Challenge. He finished third in the SCORE Las Vegas PRIMM 3000. Renezeder set the all-time track record at Crandon when he raced around the 1.5-mile (2.5-km) circuit in 1:24.121 second. It is the current record as of 2009.

In 2007, Renezeder won 21 races during the season. For the 2007 Baja 1000, he and team owner Mark Post teamed up with CORR driver Rob MacCachren to take the overall race win, completing the 1,296-mile (2,086 km) course in 25 hours, 21 minutes and 25 seconds to win by only six minutes. It was the first time that a Trophy Truck had the overall win in the 13 years that the class has competed in the event. Motorcycles frequently beat trophy trucks and buggies in the event that traverses the Baja California peninsula from Ensenada to Cabo San Lucas. He won the Pro-4 championship in CORR after winning eight events. These wins included the Jason Baldwin Memorial Cup and the Forest County Potawatomi Chairman's Cup at the June Crandon race. In CORR's Pro-2, he won seven races and finished third in points. He also competed in several WSORR races, winning three Pro2WD and three Pro4x4 events.

Renezeder won the 2008 CORR Pro-4 championship. He won four Pro-4 and two Pro-2 races in CORR plus one RJORGP GP4 event. In WSORR, he won two PRO-2WD and two PRO-4x4 races. In SCORE, he won the second day of the Laughlin Desert Challenge.

CORR closed at the final event of the 2008 season, and Renezeder joined the newly formed Lucas Oil Off Road Racing Series in 2009. He competed in both of their trophy truck series: the Unlimited 2 series for two wheel drive trucks and the Unlimited 4 series for four wheel drive trucks. Going into the final Unlimited 2 points event at Primm, Renezeder held a five-point lead. He finished high enough in the final feature to win by one point over Jeff Ward and Todd LeDuc. He entered the final Unlimited 4 points race with a 17-point lead over Alan Pflueger. Renezeder crashed with Adrian Cenni in the first turn and Pflueger's truck was damaged enough to end his race. Renezeder was able to continue and he won the championship. Later in the Unlimited 4 / Pro 4 class, he resulted LOORS champion in 2011 and 2013, third in 2010 and 2012, and sixth in 2014.

In April 2017, Renezeder announced that he will retire as driver at the end of the season. He raced in a gold-colored truck for the season. He competed in the LOORS races throughout the season. He also returned to Crandon (after a ten-year absence) for its World Cup event; he came with his traditional white paint for the event.

== Season championships and world championship races wins ==
- 2016 LOORRS Pro 4 Tied in Points for Pro 4 season end points
- 2015 LOORRS Pro 4 Challenge Cup
- 2013 LOORRS Pro 4 Championship
- 2012 LOORRS Pro 4 Challenge Cup
- 2011 LOORRS Pro 4 Championship
- 2009 LOORRS Pro 4 Championship
- 2009 LOORRS Pro 2 Championship
- 2009 LOORRS Pro 4 Challenge Cup
- 2008 CORR Pro 4 Championship
- 2007 CORR Pro 4 Championship
- 2006 CORR Pro 2 Championship
- 2005 CORR Pro 2 Championship
- 2003 CORR Pro 4 Championship
- 2003 Crandon Borg-Warner World Championship

== Personal life ==
Renezeder is married to Kelley Baldwin, and they have four children. Kelley is the sister of off road racers Josh Baldwin and Jason Baldwin. Kelley also races and has driven buggies.
