= Rob MacCachren =

American racing driver

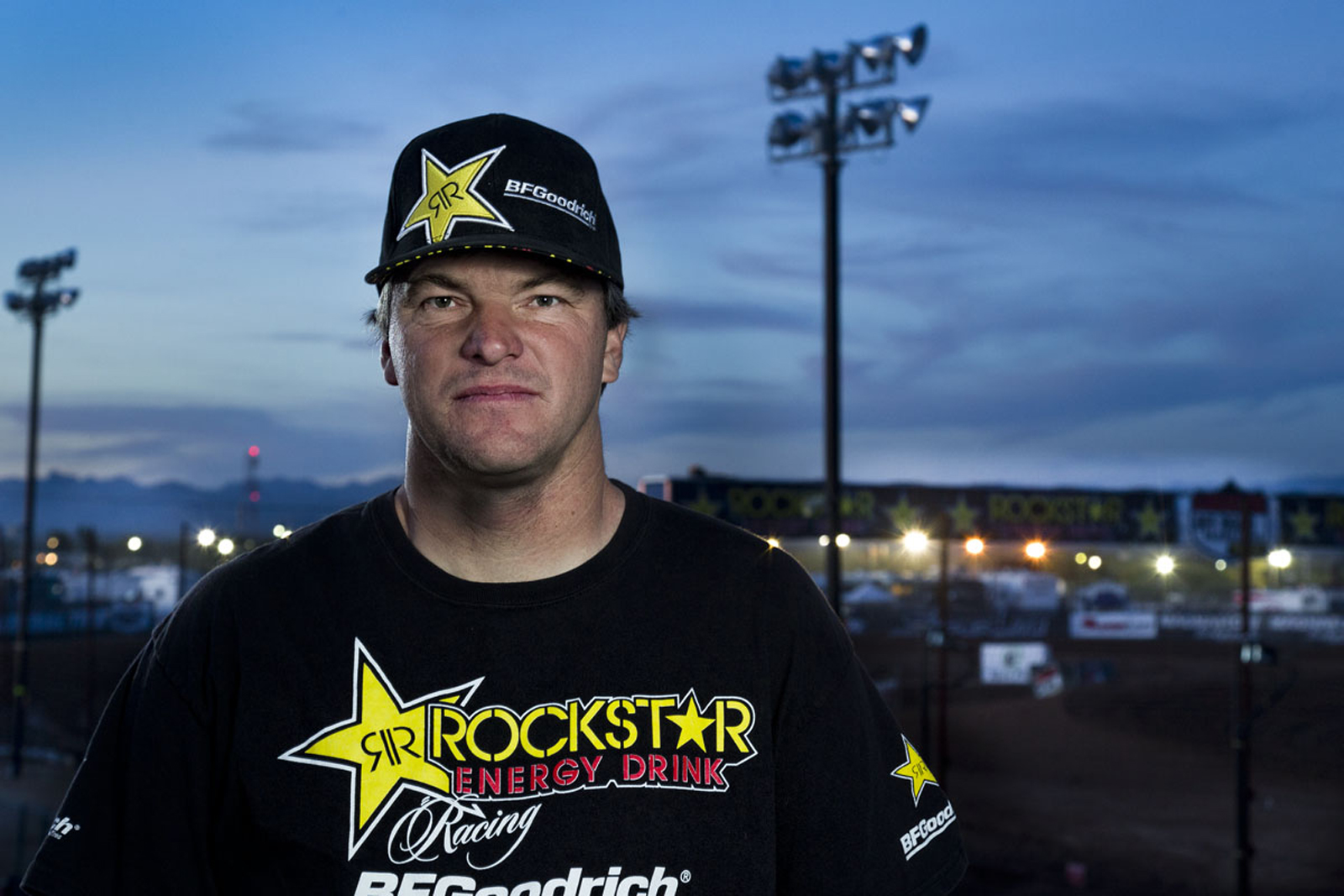
- MacCachren at Speedworld for LOORRS racing
- Nationality: United States
- Born: March 24, 1965 (age 61)

Championship titles
- 2000, 2001 CORR Pro 4; 2008 CORR Pro 2; 2010, 2013, 2015 LOORS Pro 2; 2007, 2014, 2015, 2016, 2021, 2022 Baja 1000

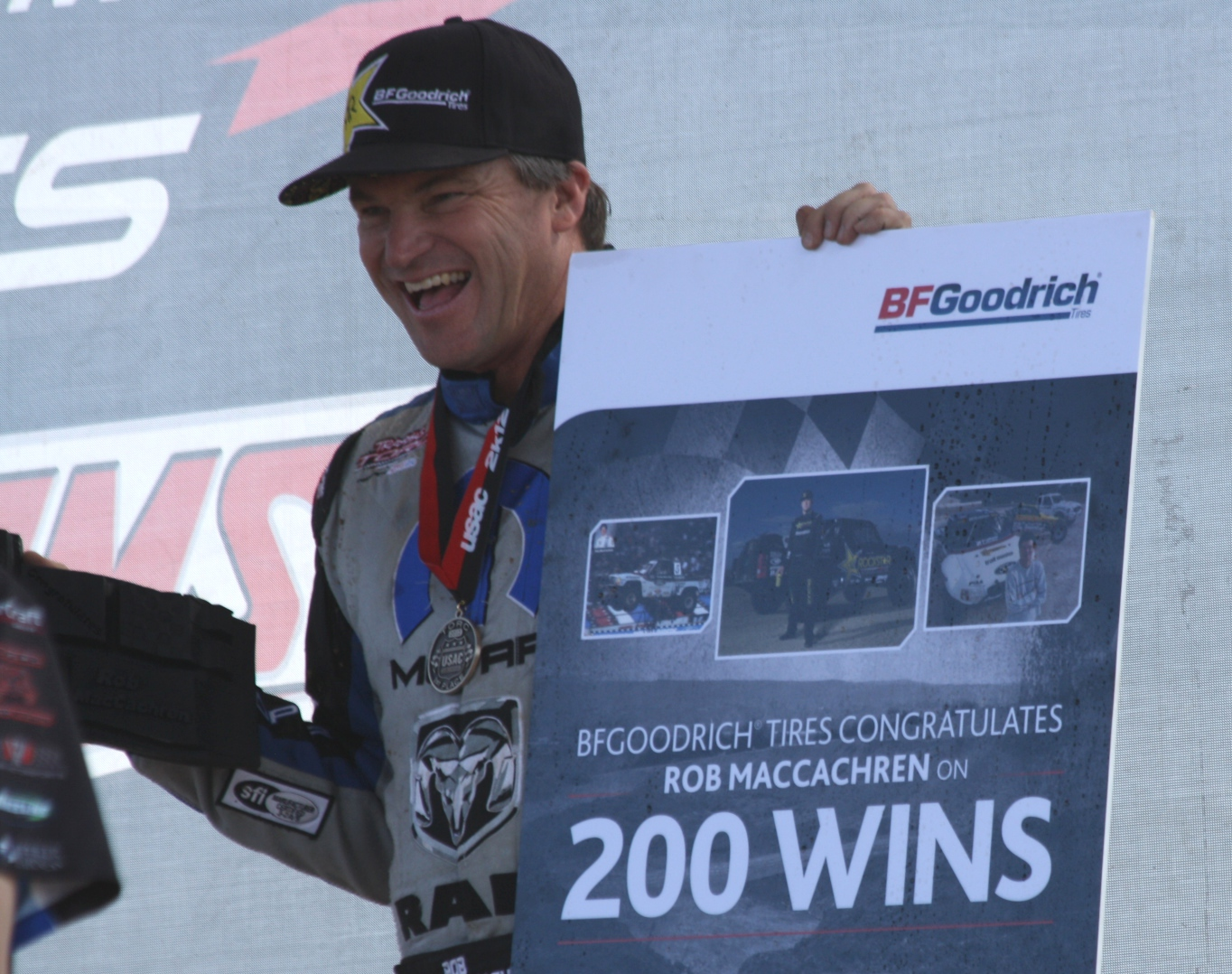
MacCachren celebrates his 200th career win

Rob MacCachren (born March 24, 1965) is an American off-road racer from Las Vegas, Nevada. MacCachren won over 200 off-road races including seven editions of the Baja 1000.

MacCachren raced the Mickey Thompson Stadium Series early in his career and went on to win championships in Championship Off-Road Racing (CORR), SCORE International, SODA, and Best in the Desert (BITD). MacCachren won his 200th event at Crandon International Off-Road Raceway at the 2012 World Championship Pro 2 race. He has won 20 championships during his racing career, including three BorgWarner World Championships and the 2008 CORR Pro-2 championship. He drives the Rockstar Energy Drink Ford Trophy Truck in SCORE and the Rockstar Energy Drink Pro 2 Unlimited in LOORRS. He is a 2011 inductee in the Off-road Motorsports Hall of Fame.

== Career ==
=== 1980s ===
MacCachren, the son of an off-road racer, began racing dirt bikes in the terrain around Las Vegas, winning the 1973 Nevada State Motorcycle Championship as an eight-year-old.

MacCachren raced off-road in Southern Nevada Off-Road Enthusiasts (SNORE) in 1982, winning the Driver of the Year points and being named "Rookie of the Year" by the Nevada Motorsports Writers Association. In 1983, he was nominated for the Nevada Sports Writers Association's "Top Off-Road Driver" and for their "Competitor of the Year" in the following year. In 1985, he won six straight SNORE events on his way to winning the season championship. That same year, he won the Triple Crown at the Silver Dust Racing Association.

In 1986, MacCachren won his second SNORE championship. He also began competing in SCORE International and was nominated for SCORE's Rookie of the Year award. The following year, MacCachren captured his third SNORE championship as well as winning Driver of the Year awards in SCORE International and High Desert Racing Association (HDRA). In 1989, MacCachren raced in HDRA/SCORE, winning both the Class 7S division for light pickup trucks and the mini metal championship.

=== 1990s ===
MacCachren won HDRA/SCORE's 7S and mini metal classes again in 1991 and was nominated for their Driver of the Year award. He competed in the final season of the Mickey Thompson Entertainment Group (MTEG) Grand National Sport Trucks in 1994. The same season he became the first Desert Trophy Truck Champion for Venable Racing. He followed up the championship by winning MTEG's first Thunder Truck championship in 1995. At SODA's nationally televised events, he took the Governor's Cup at Crandon en route to winning the Class 4 season championship for 4-wheel-drive Trophy Trucks. He also won SNORE's Class 1 / 2 1600 buggy championship, set the qualifying record for CORR's Borg Warner World Championship race, and won CORR's Winter Series championship. By that time CORR had replaced SODA as the top short course in the nation. In 1999, he won the BorgWarner World Championship race at Crandon.

In 1994, MacCachren competed in four NASCAR SuperTruck Series exhibition races for Venable Racing, winning at Portland Speedway. With Venable, he also competed at Tucson Raceway Park in the Winston West Series, finishing 14th.

=== 2000s ===
In 2000, MacCachren won the first of three consecutive Governor's BorgWarner World Championship Shootout races. The following year, he competed in SNORE, SCORE, and CORR. In SNORE, he was the overall and class champion. He also won the Best in the Desert 7300 championship. In SCORE, he was the overall champion and won the class 1 / 2 — 1600 championship. In CORR, he took the Governor's Cup championship at Crandon's Spring Brush Run and the Pro-4 Borg Warner championship at Crandon's World Championships on Labor Day weekend en route to winning the 2002 Pro-4 championship. For his performance that season, he was awarded the Toyota True Grit Award and the AARWBA (American Auto Racing Writers and Broadcasters Association) award. His 2003 season ended with a SNORE class championship and a Pro 1600 Class 1 / 2 — 1600 Series Championship.

In 2003, MacCachren and fellow Mexican driver Gus Vildósola took the overall win on board of the #4 Vildosola Racing Trophy Truck during the 2003 San Felipe 250.

MacCachren was nominated for the AARWBA award in 2004 after winning the Laughlin Class Championships (1 / 2 — 1600 & Class 12) and SCORE's Laughlin Leap Championship, with his pit crew helping him win the SCORE Laughlin Pit Crew Challenge Championship. In 2005, he won the AARWBA award after capturing the Best in the Desert Class 7300 Championship.

MacCachren won his first overall SCORE championship in 2007 after winning three of six events. In 2007, he won 12 events in two CORR classes, adding four SCORE and BITD wins. For the 40th annual Baja 1000, he and co-driver/team owner Mark Post teamed up with CORR driver Carl Renezeder to take the overall race, completing the 1,296-mile (2,086 km) course in 25 hours, 21 minutes and 25 seconds to win by only six minutes. It was the first time that a Trophy Truck had the overall win in the 13 years that the class has competed in the event. It was his first overall win in desert off-road racing's premiere event after his class wins between 1992 and 2004. With the win, MacCachren and Post became the first trophy truck drivers to take SCORE's overall season points championship.

During the 2008 season, MacCachren competed in CORR in the Pro-2 and Pro Buggy divisions, winning the season championship in both divisions. CORR folded at the end of the season, so he raced in the new Traxxas TORC Series in 2009. He returned to SNORE and needed to win several races at the Mint 400 racing weekend to have a chance at winning the championship. MacCachren ended up winning four of five races, missing one event that conflicted with his TORC schedule, and won the 1600 car class at the event in seventh place overall behind trophy trucks and Class 1 cars.

=== 2010s ===
After decades of winning in the desert, MasterCraft Racing offered MacCachren the opportunity to pilot his own Jimco Trophy Truck as driver of record for the entire SCORE International series. At the 2011 San Felipe 250, MacCachren took the Trophy Truck class win and overall victory with a margin of 44 seconds and a total time of 4:17.45 (58.7MPH). Later in the 2011 SCORE season, MacCachren won the San Felipe Challenge of Champions. These victories, combined with his fourth-place finish at the Laughlin Desert Challenge, 9th-place finish at the Baja 500, and 11th-place finish at the Baja 1000, allowed MacCachren to finish second in points for the season in the marquee Trophy Truck class and take home the coveted Toyota Iron Man Award.

In 2012, MacCachren started the season with a victory at Sunday's Laughlin Desert Challenge (the race was run on Saturday and Sunday as two separate points races). He then won the San Felipe 250 for the second year in a row.

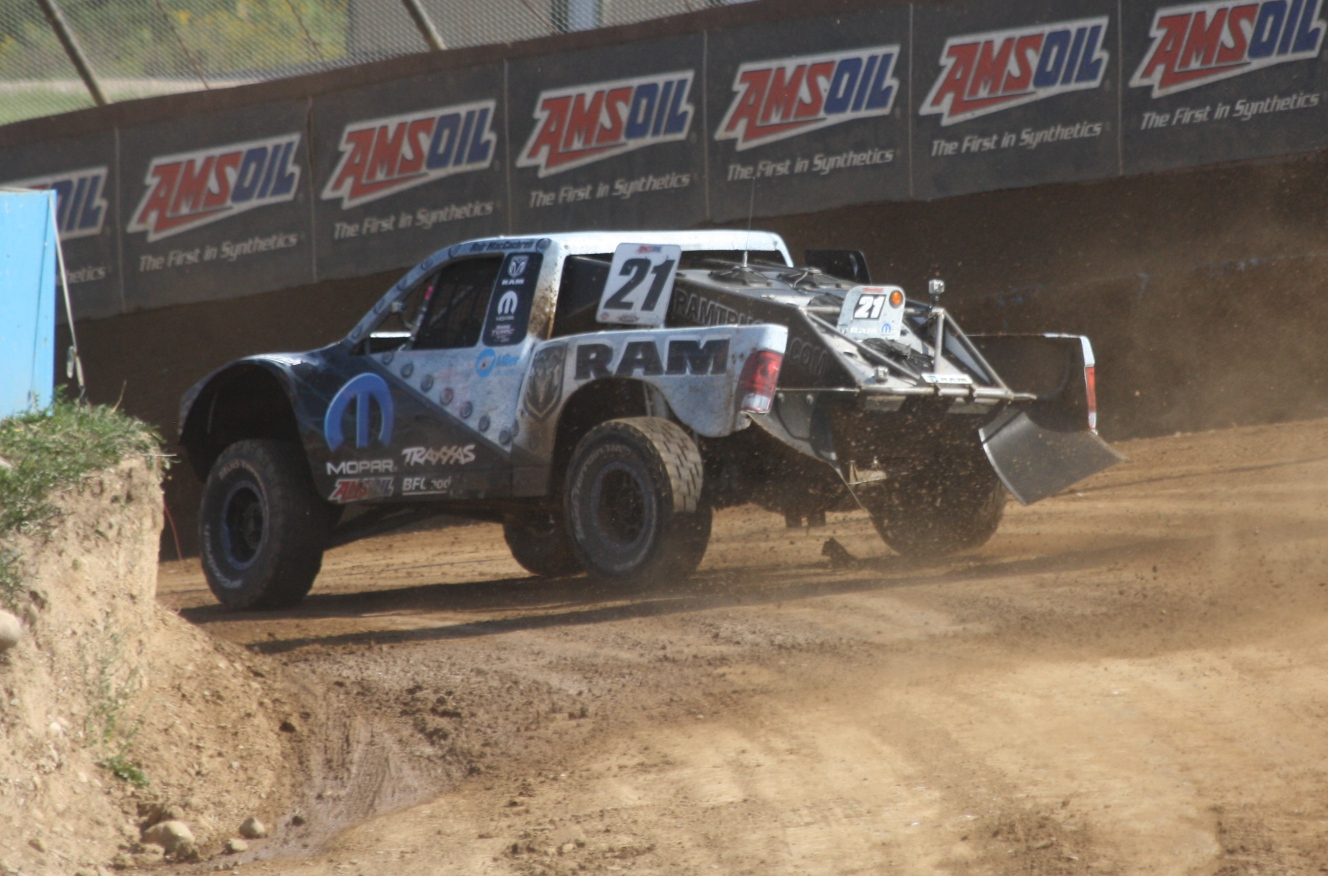
MacCachren's racing his Pro 2WD truck to his 200th victory in TORC

In short course, MacCachren won the Lucas Oil Off Road Racing Series (LOORRS) Pro 2 title in 2010, winning a record 9 out of the 15 rounds of racing. MacCachren was also successful in the competing TORC Pro 2WD series where he finished second for the season. In 2011, MacCachren finish second in season points in LOORRS and second in TORC as well with five victories in LOORRS and three wins in TORC. In 2012, MacCachren won the $20,000 Chairman's Cup at Crandon behind the wheel of the MOPAR RAM Pro 2WD. He won his 200th career event later that year at Crandon during the track's second weekend (on the first weekend in September), the Sunday "World Championship" Pro 2 event.

In 2013, MacCachren signed a deal to compete in Robby Gordon's new truck racing series modeled after Mickey Thompson's Stadium series, the Stadium Super Trucks. He won the inaugural event in March at University of Phoenix Stadium and won another round in May. MacCachren ended the season with four wins but finished second in the championship to Gordon. He skipped the three Stadium Super Truck events at Costa Mesa due to a conflict with his LOORRS schedule in which he found himself engaged in simultaneous battles for the Pro 2 and Pro 4 championships with Carl Renezeder. Renezeder would ultimately prevail by a wide margin in Pro 4, but MacCachren was able to squeak out a title in Pro 2.

MacCachren competed in LOORRS in 2014, finishing runner-up in both Pro 4 and Pro 2 classes. In November, he co-drove the overall truck/car winner at the Baja 1000 along with Andy McMillan and Jason Voss. Their Trophy Truck field had 31 entries and they won over 237 overall entries by 29 minutes. It was MacCachren's second overall win and seventh class win in the race.

MacCachren won the Baja 1000 again in 2015 and 2016. He also took home LOORRS Pro 2 titles back to back in 2015 and 2016, whereas in the Pro 4 class he finished runner-up in 2015 and third in 2016.

2017 saw MacCachren win another SCORE San Felipe 250 and his first Best in the Desert Mint 400 in his hometown of Las Vegas.

The 2018 season resulted in a second consecutive SCORE San Felipe 250 overall win followed by an overall win at the 50th BFGoodrich Tires SCORE Baja 500 in June.

=== 2020s ===
During the 2020 season, MacCachren finished second at the Baja 1000.

In 2021, MacCachren won the Baja 1000 (with Luke McMillin) and the Mint 400 (with his son Cayden).

MacCachren won the 2022 Baja 500.

MacCachren, paired with Luke McMillin, won the 2024 Baja 1000. The 2024 win marks his seventh overall win.

== Awards ==
MacCachren was named the 2007 Dirtsports Magazine Driver of the Year. He was named the 2007 BFGoodrich Tires Motorsports Person of the Year. He also received American Auto Racing Writers & Broadcasters Association AUTO RACING All-America FIRST Team honors three times.

MacCachren was inducted in the Off-road Motorsports Hall of Fame in 2011.

== Motorsports career results ==
=== Lucas Oil Off Road Racing Series ===
(key) (Bold – Pole position. )

Lucas Oil Off Road Racing Series results
Year	1	2	3	4	5	6	7	8	9	10	11	PRO 2	Pts	Ref
2018	Rnd1; **1**	Rnd2; 1	Rnd3; 4	Rnd4; 1	Rnd5; 1	Rnd6; 5	Rnd7; **1**	Rnd8; **2**	Rnd9; **7**	Rnd10; 11	Rnd11; 6	1st	532	

=== Stadium Super Trucks ===
(key) (Bold – Pole position. Italics – Fastest qualifier. * – Most laps led.)

Stadium Super Trucks results
Year	1	2	3	4	5	6	7	8	9	10	11	12	13	14	SSTC	Pts	Ref
2013	PHO; 1	LBH; 3	LAN; 2	SDG; 1	SDG; 3	STL; 1	**TOR**; 2	TOR; 4	CRA; 1	CRA; 4	OCF	OCF	OCF	**CPL**; 6	2nd	400	
