= List of Monster Jam video games =

Monster Jam is a live motorsport event tour and television show operated by Feld Entertainment. The series is sanctioned under the umbrella of the United States Hot Rod Association (USHRA) and takes place primarily in the United States. Although individual event formats can vary greatly based on the "intermission" entertainment, the main attraction is always the racing and freestyle competitions by monster trucks.

Several licensed Monster Jam video games have been made, generally under the Monster Jam brand name, with the first one being released during the sixth generation of video games. The rights to publish licensed Monster Jam video games were first granted to Ubisoft and have changed hands several times over the years to Activision, Game Mill Entertainment and THQ Nordic. At least one Monster Jam game has been available on each the following platforms: Game Boy Advance, GameCube, Microsoft Windows, PlayStation 2, Nintendo DS, PlayStation 3, Wii, Xbox 360, Nintendo Switch, PlayStation 4, Xbox One, and Google Stadia. After losing the license for Monster Jam following the release of Monster 4x4: Masters of Metal, Ubisoft continued to make independent sequels for it that would make Monster 4x4 an independent series of its own that offered a more unique monster truck racing experience.

== Games ==
=== Monster Jam: Maximum Destruction ===
Monster Jam: Maximum Destruction
- Developers: Inland Productions (consoles); High Voltage Software (Windows); Unique Development Studios (GBA)
- Publisher: Ubi Soft
- Platforms: Game Boy Advance, GameCube, Windows, PlayStation 2
- Release: Game Boy Advance: NA: March 26, 2002; PAL: October 4, 2002; PlayStation 2: NA: June 5, 2002; PAL: January 31, 2003; Windows: NA: December 3, 2002; GameCube: NA: November 19, 2002; PAL: December 6, 2002
- Genre: Vehicular combat
- Modes: Single-player, multiplayer

Monster Jam: Maximum Destruction is a vehicular combat video game released in 2002 by Unique Development Studios. It is based on the USHRA Monster Jam series, and features several real life monster trucks including Grave Digger. Although it contains racing-based minigames, the primary focus is on the combat, which includes power-ups and weapons in addition to demolition derby style maneuvers.

Players can choose between Exhibitions, Mini Games and Seasons. Exhibitions are either Death Matches, where the match will only go until there is one truck standing; Cash Grab is where the player collects most of the power ups, with a certain number based on the difficulty played on by the end of three minutes; players can also try to collect the most money for damage (which are considered points) in Points mode with a certain number based on the difficulty by the end of three minutes.

==== Reception ====
Monster Jam: Maximum Destruction

Aggregate scores
| Aggregator | Score | | |
| Aggregator | GBA | GameCube | PS2 |
|---|---|---|---|
| GameRankings | 56% | 49% | 52% |
| Metacritic | 58/100 | N/A | 47/100 |

Review scores
| Publication | Score | | |
| Publication | GBA | GameCube | PS2 |
|---|---|---|---|
| 4Players | N/A | 44% | 44% |
| EP Daily | 6.5/10 | N/A | 5.5/10 |
| Game Informer | 6/10 | N/A | 6.5/10 |
| GamesMaster | N/A | N/A | 28% |
| GameSpot | N/A | N/A | 4.6/10 |
| GameSpy | 52% | N/A | 1.5/5 |
| GameZone | 6.7/10 | N/A | 4.7/10 |
| IGN | 5.5/10 | N/A | 3.6/10 |
| Jeuxvideo.com | 11/20 | N/A | N/A |
| Nintendo Power | 3.2/5 | 3.1/5 | N/A |
| PlayStation Official Magazine – UK | N/A | N/A | 3/10 |

The Game Boy Advance version received "mixed" reviews, while the PlayStation 2 version received "generally unfavorable reviews", according to the review aggregation website Metacritic.

=== Monster 4x4: Masters of Metal ===
Monster 4x4: Masters of Metal
- Developers: Ubi Soft Barcelona; Inland Productions
- Publisher: Ubi Soft
- Series: Monster 4x4
- Platforms: GameCube, PlayStation 2
- Release: PlayStation 2: NA: November 25, 2003; GameCube: NA: December 10, 2003
- Genre: Racing
- Modes: Single-player, multiplayer

Monster 4x4: Masters of Metal is a racing game released in 2003 by Ubisoft. It is licensed by and loosely based on the USHRA Monster Jam series and features many real-life monster trucks, including Grave Digger and Maximum Destruction. Although it is an unofficial sequel to Monster Jam: Maximum Destruction, it forgoes the vehicular combat of the predecessor to focus on arcade-style racing and exaggerated freestyle.

The player's goal is to win as many races in stadiums and off-roads as possible. The player can race in New York, Florida, Louisiana, Illinois, Minnesota, Kansas, South California, North California, Nevada, Las Vegas and The Moon (as a bonus level). As long as the player has the most points in the end of the season, the player is the Monster Jam World Finals Racing Champion.

==== Reception ====
Monster 4x4: Masters of Metal

Aggregate score
| Aggregator | Score | |
| Aggregator | GameCube | PS2 |
|---|---|---|
| Metacritic | 49/100 | 48/100 |

Review scores
| Publication | Score | |
| Publication | GameCube | PS2 |
|---|---|---|
| Electronic Gaming Monthly | 5/10 (Note: Two critics of Electronic Gaming Monthly gave the game each a score of 4.5/10, and the other gave it 6/10.) | 5/10 |
| Game Informer | 6.5/10 | 6.5/10 |
| GameSpot | 5/10 | 5/10 |
| GameZone | 6/10 | 6.5/10 |
| IGN | 3.8/10 | 3.8/10 |
| Nintendo Power | 3.1/5 | N/A |
| Official U.S. PlayStation Magazine | N/A | 2.5/5 |
| X-Play | N/A | 2/5 |

The game received "generally unfavorable reviews" on both platforms according to Metacritic.

This game launched a spin-off series that dropped the Monster Jam license and continued with Monster 4x4: World Circuit.

=== Monster Jam ===
Monster Jam
- Developer: Torus Games
- Publisher: Activision
- Platforms: Nintendo DS, PlayStation 2, Wii, Windows, Xbox 360
- Release: NA: November 13, 2007; NA: November 21, 2007 (Wii); AU: May 28, 2008; EU: May 30, 2008
- Genre: Racing
- Modes: Single player, multiplayer

Monster Jam is a video game of the off-road racing genre, developed by Torus Games and published by Activision, becoming the first of three Monster Jam to be published by that firm and available for the PlayStation 2 and non-Sony seventh-generation platforms. It is licensed by the USHRA Monster Jam series and features 20 real-life monster trucks, in contrast to Monster 4x4: World Circuit, including Grave Digger and Maximum Destruction. This was the first Monster Jam game to feature stadium drag racing, and to also have cross-country off-road racing in a similar vein to the previous Monster 4x4: Masters of Metal game, as well as freestyle. The game features commentary by Scott Douglas.

The included trucks are: Avenger, Blacksmith, Blue Thunder, Bounty Hunter, Brutus, Bulldozer, Captain's Curse, Destroyer, El Toro Loco, Grave Digger, Grave Digger 25th Anniversary, Iron Outlaw, King Krunch, Maximum Destruction, Monster Mutt, Monster Mutt Dalmatian, Predator, Scarlet Bandit, Team Suzuki, and Pastrana 199.

Original music for the game was composed by Finn Robertson.

==== Reception ====
Monster Jam

Aggregate score
| Aggregator | Score | | | | |
| Aggregator | DS | PC | PS2 | Wii | Xbox 360 |
|---|---|---|---|---|---|
| Metacritic | 65/100 | 56/100 | 23/100 | 45/100 | 43/100 |

Review scores
| Publication | Score | | | | |
| Publication | DS | PC | PS2 | Wii | Xbox 360 |
|---|---|---|---|---|---|
| Eurogamer | N/A | N/A | N/A | N/A | 4/10 |
| GamesMaster | N/A | N/A | N/A | N/A | 58% |
| IGN | 7/10 | N/A | N/A | N/A | N/A |
| Jeuxvideo.com | 4/20 | 7/10 | 7/20 | 7/20 | 7/20 |
| Official Xbox Magazine (US) | N/A | N/A | N/A | N/A | 4/10 |
| PALGN | N/A | N/A | N/A | 4.5/10 | N/A |
| PC Format | N/A | 54% | N/A | N/A | N/A |
| PC Gamer (UK) | N/A | 58% | N/A | N/A | N/A |
| Pocket Gamer | 3/5 | N/A | N/A | N/A | N/A |
| PSM3 | N/A | N/A | 23% | N/A | N/A |

The DS and PC versions received "mixed" reviews, while the PlayStation 2, Wii, and Xbox 360 versions received "generally unfavorable reviews", according to Metacritic.

=== Monster Jam: Urban Assault ===
Monster Jam: Urban Assault
- Developer: Torus Games
- Publisher: Activision
- Series: Monster Jam
- Platforms: PlayStation 2 PlayStation Portable; Wii; Nintendo DS
- Release: October 28, 2008
- Genre: Racing
- Modes: Single-player, multiplayer

Monster Jam: Urban Assault is a video game based on the popular monster truck series Monster Jam that was released on October 28, 2008, for PlayStation 2, PlayStation Portable, Nintendo DS and Wii. It is the sequel to the Monster Jam video game. It is based on the USHRA Monster Jam Monster Trucks series. The game was published by Activision and developed by Torus Games.

Players drive monster trucks on the streets of cities such as New York City and London. The game also includes minigames such as skee ball.

=== Monster Jam: Path of Destruction ===
Monster Jam: Path of Destruction
- Developer: Virtuos
- Publisher: Activision
- Platforms: Wii; Xbox 360; PlayStation 3 Nintendo DS; PlayStation Portable
- Release: NA: November 9, 2010; EU: March 18, 2011
- Genre: Racing
- Modes: Single-player, Multiplayer

Monster Jam: Path of Destruction is a racing video game based on the USHRA monster truck series and the third and final Monster Jam game to be published by Activision, releasing on all major seventh-generation platforms in late 2010. It was the fourth edition in the series, the previous release being Monster Jam: Urban Assault. Monster Jam: Path of Destruction was released on November 9, 2010 in North America and on March 18, 2011 in Europe and the United Kingdom.

The game features 28 licensed Monster Jam trucks. A new feature allows players to customize their own trucks with more than 1,000 parts. The game's multiplayer functions are head-to-head like the previous games.

Activision unveiled the game's title on July 28, 2010. Dennis Anderson, along with Tom Meents, George Balhan, Lupe Soza and Scott Douglass provided voice overs.

=== Monster Jam (iOS) and Monster Jam Battlegrounds ===
Monster Jam & Monster Jam Battlegrounds
- Developer: Team6 Game Studios
- Publisher: GameMill Entertainment
- Platforms: iOS; Battlegrounds; Microsoft Windows, PlayStation 3, Xbox 360
- Release: NA: January 20, 2014; Battlegrounds; Xbox 360: EU: April 8, 2015; NA: June 10, 2015; Microsoft Windows: NA: June 10, 2015; PlayStation 3: NA: July 14, 2015; PAL: May 24, 2016
- Genre: Racing
- Modes: Single-player, multiplayer

Monster Jam is an iOS game developed by Team6 Game Studios and released by GameMill Entertainment in 2014. An expanded, updated version, titled Monster Jam Battlegrounds, was later released on PC, PlayStation 3 and Xbox 360.

The games feature 2.5D modes, with one being similar to the Trials series, as well as third-person stadium races and freestyle events. Monster Jam (2014) features 24 licensed monster trucks, while Monster Jam Battlegrounds features 23 trucks.

=== Monster Jam: Crush It! ===
Monster Jam: Crush It!
- Developer: Team6 Game Studios
- Publishers: NA: GameMill Entertainment; EU: Maximum Games
- Platforms: PlayStation 4 Xbox One; Nintendo Switch
- Release: PlayStation 4, Xbox One; October 25, 2016; Nintendo Switch; October 31, 2017
- Genre: Racing
- Mode: Single-player

Monster Jam: Crush It! is a Monster Jam racing game developed by Team6 Game Studios and published by GameMill Entertainment in North America and Maximum Games in Europe. It is the first Monster Jam game released on eighth-generation consoles. It was released for PlayStation 4 and Xbox One on October 25, 2016, and for Nintendo Switch on October 31, 2017. It features similar gameplay to the previous Monster Jam game. It received "generally unfavorable reviews" according to Metacritic with a score of 36/100.

=== Monster Jam Steel Titans ===
Monster Jam Steel Titans
- Developer: Rainbow Studios
- Publisher: THQ Nordic
- Engine: Unreal Engine 4
- Platforms: Microsoft Windows; PlayStation 4 Xbox One; Nintendo Switch; Stadia (closed)
- Release: Windows, PS4, Xbox One; June 25, 2019; Nintendo Switch; November 26, 2019; Stadia; December 2, 2020
- Genre: Racing
- Modes: Single-player, Multiplayer

Monster Jam Steel Titans is a Monster Jam racing game developed by Rainbow Studios and published by THQ Nordic in 2019 for Microsoft Windows, PlayStation 4, Xbox One, and Nintendo Switch. A version for Google Stadia was released in December 2020.

The game features an explorable offroad environment with desert and forest sections. A career mode features outdoor races as well as stadium events. Over 30 monster trucks are present.

A sequel, Monster Jam Steel Titans 2, was released on March 2, 2021 for the same platforms.

=== Monster Jam Steel Titans 2 ===
Monster Jam Steel Titans 2
- Developer: Rainbow Studios
- Publisher: THQ Nordic
- Engine: Unreal Engine 4
- Platforms: Microsoft Windows; Nintendo Switch; PlayStation 4 Xbox One; Stadia (closed)
- Release: March 2, 2021
- Genre: Racing
- Modes: Single-player, Multiplayer

Monster Jam Steel Titans 2 is a Monster Jam racing game developed by Rainbow Studios and published by THQ Nordic for Google Stadia, Microsoft Windows, Nintendo Switch, PlayStation 4 and Xbox One, with all versions releasing simultaneously in major global territories on March 2, 2021. It is the sequel to 2019's Monster Jam Steel Titans.

Gameplay is similar to the previous Steel Titans, but the open world, career, and selection of monster trucks has been expanded.

=== Monster Jam Showdown ===
Monster Jam Showdown
- Developer: Milestone S.r.l.
- Publisher: Milestone S.r.l.
- Engine: Unreal Engine 5
- Platforms: Microsoft Windows; Nintendo Switch; PlayStation 5 PlayStation 4 Xbox One; Xbox Series X/S; Steam; Epic Games Store
- Release: August 29, 2024
- Genre: Racing
- Modes: Single-player, multiplayer

Monster Jam Showdown is a Monster Jam racing game developed and published by Milestone S.r.l. for Microsoft Windows, Nintendo Switch, PlayStation 5, PlayStation 4, Xbox One, Xbox Series, Steam, and the Epic Games Store, with all versions releasing simultaneously in major global territories on August 29, 2024.
