= Finn Robertson =

Australian front-end web developer (born 1981)

Finn Buster Robertson
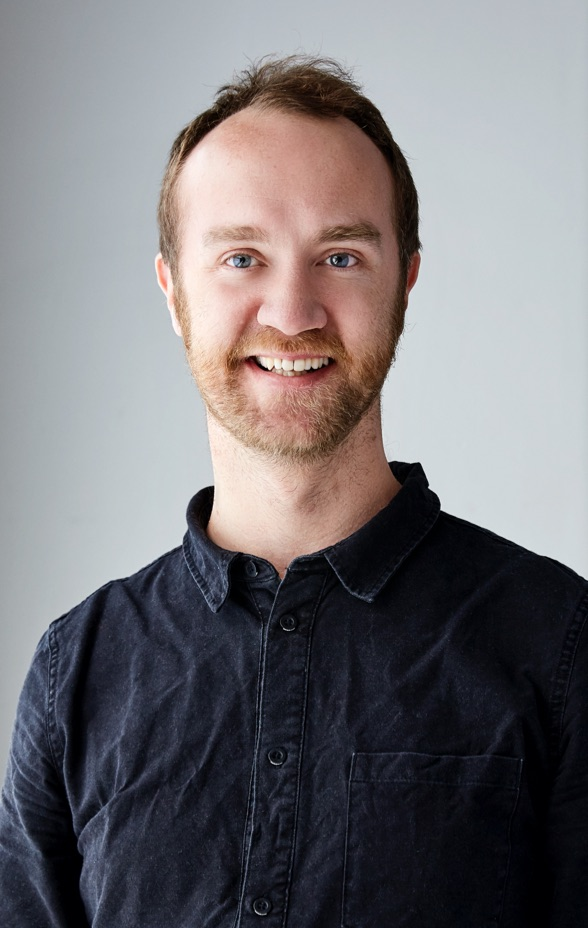
- Finn Robertson in 2019

Background information
- Born: 13 September 1981 (age 45)
- Origin: Melbourne, Australia
- Occupation: Front-end web developer
- Years active: 2004–present
- Website: https://www.finnrobertson.com

Finn Buster Robertson (born 13 September 1981) is an Australian front-end web developer who was previously a composer and music producer.

Before founding his independent front-end development studio based in Melbourne, he grew up in rural Victoria, learning to play piano, guitar, and trumpet before discovering the sounds that were possible to make with a computer. From 2000 to 2002 he made early experiments in electronic and acoustic composition at RMIT University's Media Arts under Philip Brophy and Philip Samartzis. His works integrate electronic music sounds with traditional orchestral arrangements.

== Career ==
Robertson worked in-house as audio director and lead composer for three years at Torus Games in Melbourne, over which time he created the soundtracks and oversaw the sound design of over 10 commercially released games including

- Scooby-Doo! and the Spooky Swamp for Warner Bros. Interactive Entertainment
- Scooby-Doo! First Frights for Warner Bros. Interactive Entertainment
- Zoo Hospital Wii for Majesco
- Monster Jam: Urban Assault for Activision
- Monster Jam for Activision
- Shrek Smash n' Crash Racing for Activision
- Spider-Man: Battle for New York for Activision.
