= Bulldozer (disambiguation) =

A bulldozer is a type of tracked tractor with a big front blade.

Bulldozer or Bulldozed may also refer to:

- Bulldozer (character), two fictional Marvel Comics characters
- Bulldozer (book), a novel by Stephen W. Meader
- Bulldozer (film), a 1978 Italian film with Bud Spencer
- Bulldozer (microarchitecture), a CPU (processor) microarchitecture code-name by AMD
- Bulldozer (truck), a monster truck
- "The Bulldozer", a nickname for John Magufuli (1959–2021), fifth president of Tanzania
- Bulldozer, a special enemy in the video game series Payday.
- Bull, (also known as Bulldozer), a rare shotgun wielding brawler in mobile game Brawl Stars
- Bulldozed (book), a 2022 book about Australian politics by Niki Savva

== Music ==
- Bulldoze (band), an American punk band
- Bulldozer (band), an Italian metal band
- Bulldozer (EP), the second EP of the band Big Black
- Buldožer, a Yugoslav-Slovenian rock band
- Bulldozer an album, by MNEK
