= Ashen =

Ashen may refer to:

== Adjectival ==
- Made from ash-wood
- Cinereous, having a grey colour resembling ash (the unburnable solid remains of a combustion)
- In a medical context, ashen describes how a person with cyanosis looks, referring to a bluish hue resulting from a lack of oxygenation of hemoglobin in the blood.

== Music, media and entertainment ==
- Ashen, a demo by the funeral doom metal band Celestiial
- Ashen (2004 video game), a game for N-Gage developed by Torus
- Ashen (2018 video game)

== People ==
- Stuart Ashen (born 1976), also known as Ashens, a British Comedian and YouTuber
- Ashen Silva (born 1990), Sri Lankan cricketer
- Ashen Bandara (born 1998), Sri Lankan cricketer
- Ashen Kavinda (born 1991), Sri Lankan cricketer

== Places ==
- Ashen, Essex
- Ashens, County of Borung

== Other ==
- Ashen light, a subtle glow that is seen from the night side of the planet Venus
