= Boy with a Pack =

1939 children's book by Stephen W. Meader

- First edition
- Illustrator: Stephen W. Meader
- Cover artist: Edward Shenton
- Language: English
- Genre: Children's literature
- Publication date: 1939
- Publication place: United States
- Pages: 297

Boy with a Pack is a children's historical novel by Stephen W. Meader. Set in 1837, it follows the journey of 17-year-old trader Bill Crawford as he travels from New Hampshire to the Ohio Country. Carrying a trunkload of supplies on his back, he is soon joined by Jody, a dog he frees from a trap in Vermont. In New York, he works as a mule driver on the Erie Canal towing a boat. He meets Mary Ann Bennett on the boat; Mary is also traveling to Ohio to start a new life. In Ohio, Bill helps the Underground Railroad smuggle a young boy to freedom. Bill decides to settle down near a grist mill in need of workers.

== Reception ==
The book collected a Newbery Honor in 1940. Anne T. Eaton's review in the New York Times called the book well-written and said it "presented an authentic and interesting picture of this country".
