= Monster Jam Showdown =

2024 video game

- Developer: Milestone
- Publisher: Milestone
- Producer: Federico Carlo Riccardo Spada
- Designer: Alex Stefano Basilio
- Programmer: Giacomo Guidi
- Artist: Carmine Napolitano
- Engine: Unreal Engine 5
- Platforms: Windows; Nintendo Switch; PlayStation 4; PlayStation 5; Xbox One; Xbox Series X/S
- Release: WW: August 29, 2024
- Genre: Racing
- Modes: Single-player, multiplayer

Monster Jam Showdown is a 2024 racing video game developed and published by Milestone. It is the eleventh game in the Monster Jam series.

== Gameplay ==
Players compete in Monster Jam events in arcade-style racing gameplay. Players can adjust the difficulty and degree of reality desired. Forty licensed monster trucks are available in the base game, some of which need to be unlocked. An additional 26 trucks are available through downloadable content. Players can also unlock power-ups for their vehicle that help perform tricks. It is playable both single-player and multiplayer, through split screen or the internet.

== Reception ==
Reception

Aggregate score
Aggregator	Score
Metacritic	(PS5) 70/100 (XSXS) 73/100

Review scores
Publication	Score
IGN	7/10
Push Square	7/10

Monster Jam Showdown received "mixed or average" reviews from critics, according to the review aggregation website Metacritic. IGN called it "a great looking, family-friendly racer", though they said it could use more depth and variety. Push Square praised the gameplay and variety of trucks, but they said it was formulaic. GamingBolt said they "really wanted to love" Showdown, but they felt found the campaign "dreadfully underwhelming", disliked how similarly the trucks played, and found the music generic. They still enjoyed the driving physics, though.
