= Tom Meents =

American monster truck driver

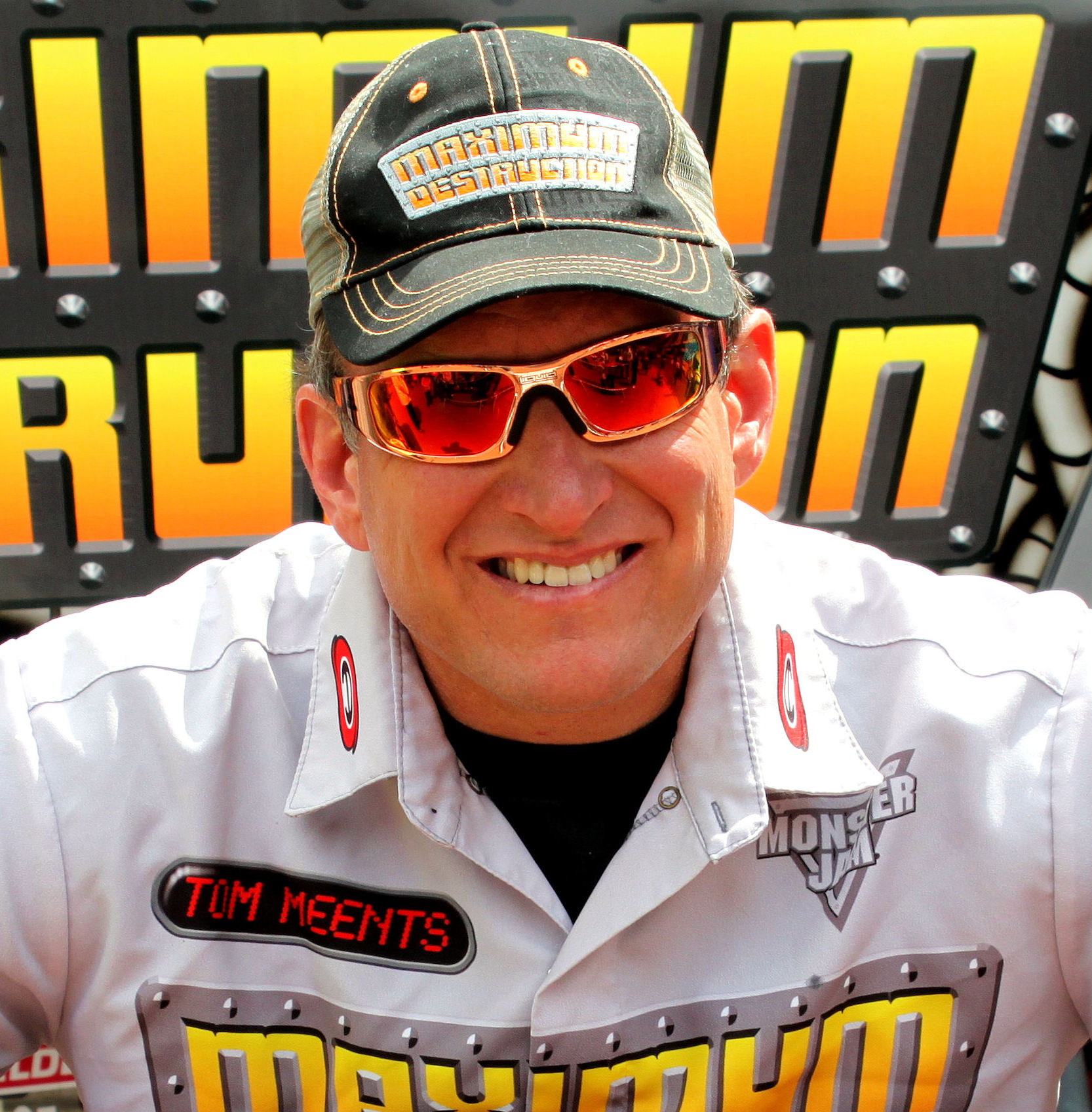
- Meents in 2011

Personal information
- Full name: Thomas William Meents
- Born: July 10, 1967 (age 59) Paxton, Illinois, U.S.
- Years active: 1993–2024
- Spouses: Debbie Meents (m. 1995; div. 2005) Darcy Eichelberger (m. 2008)
- Children: 1

Sport
- Country: United States
- Sport: Monster Jam
- Team: Max-D
- Retired: 2024

Achievements and titles
- World finals: Racing: 2000, 2001, 2002, 2009, 2011, 2012; Freestyle: 2001, 2002, 2004, 2006, 2013, 2022; Two Wheel Skills: 2019, 2022

Thomas "Tom" William Meents (MENTZ) (born July 10, 1967) is an American former professional monster truck driver. He primarily drove Monster Patrol (1993–1998), Bulldozer (1999), Goldberg (2000–2001), Team Meents (2001–2002), and Maximum Destruction/Max-D (2003–2024) in a 31 year career as a Monster Truck driver in Monster Jam. He won 14 Monster Jam World Finals championships during his career in three different trucks (six in racing, six in freestyle, two in 2-wheel skills challenge). Tom is often referred to as the professor, and the GOAT of monster trucks.

== Career ==
Tom Meents started out as a mud racer, driving his own vehicle, Shake Me. He had his first wreck when he rolled Shake Me over at a USHRA mud race in Pittsburgh, Pennsylvania. He won the NMRO Open Class championship in 1992. He later teamed up with Paul Shafer to drive Shafer's Mud Patrol vehicle. Tom won the NMRO Class 5 championship in 1993 and 1994 and won the Class 6 championship in 1993. This also led to an opportunity to drive one of Shafer's Monster Patrol monster trucks, which Tom drove to a rapid rise in popularity. Among his accomplishments in this truck was a victory at the USHRA U.S. Truck Fest in 1997.

Meents bought the truck and in 1999 was commissioned by PACE Motor Sports (FNA Live Nation, now owned by Feld Motor Sports, a division of Feld Entertainment) to run the Bulldozer monster truck, to help increase the truck's exposure. In his first event with Bulldozer, Meents defeated Dennis Anderson, driver of Grave Digger, on national television, becoming an instant star in the process. Meents would continue driving Bulldozer until December 1999 in Minneapolis, MN.

In 2000, Clear Channel (which owned Monster Jam) commissioned Meents to drive a new truck, Goldberg, named and themed after the World Championship Wrestling (WCW) wrestler. Meents was extremely successful in the truck and rose to an even greater level of popularity, despite controversy over the truck's unconventional looks. With Goldberg, Meents won the inaugural Monster Jam World Finals racing championship in 2000, and completed a full sweep of the event in 2001, winning racing and freestyle. This event was notable for the controversial encore, in which Dennis Anderson and Meents attempted to drive over each other's trucks at the end of the freestyle competition.

When WCW folded two days after the 2001 World Finals, Meents debuted Team Meents, which was a repaint of Goldberg with a similar design and lettering style. Meents again swept the World Finals in 2002 with this truck.

In 2003, the truck got a brand new image with the debut of Maximum Destruction. Meents had initially wanted to debut it in 2002 after Goldberg, but chose not to due to slowly wanting to transition from Goldberg to Maximum Destruction, as well as out of respect to the families who had lost loved ones during the September 11th terrorist attacks. Meents won a co-championship in freestyle with Madusa, driven by Debra Miceli, and El Toro Loco, driven by Lupe Soza, in 2004. In 2006, Meents won the Monster Jam World Freestyle Championship once again. Meents finally won another world racing championship in 2009 at Monster Jam World Finals X, using the same chassis that won the first championship. He regained this title once more at World Finals XII in 2011, when he won in the championship race against Jimmy Creten in Bounty Hunter. In 2012 at Monster Jam World Finals XIII, Meents defended his title once again, winning the championship race against Damon Bradshaw in Monster Energy. In 2013, Meents celebrated the ten year anniversary of Maximum Destruction's debut. At World Finals XIV, Meents' championship streak in racing was snapped by Adam Anderson in Grave Digger The Legend in the semi-finals, but Meents would go on to win his fifth world freestyle title. He also completed a double backflip during the Max-D tenth anniversary encore. In 2005 Tom Meents jumped Maximum Destruction over his old house, before destroying the house with the truck.

In August 2023, Meents announced that he would retire after the 2024 season. During his retirement tour, he suffered a career-ending injury at Lucas Oil Stadium in Indianapolis, Indiana, where he launched off a jump nose first and landed hard on the roof of the truck, dislocating his neck. His stepson, Colton Eichelberger, would substitute for him while he recovered.

== Hallmarks ==
Meents has several signature moves in freestyle, including top speed "cyclone" donuts, "side surf" two-wheel driving, and roof and wing walks where he stands on the roof or wing (as on Monster Patrol) of the truck while it is still in motion. Another is Meents sticking his left hand out the window while flying through the air. Meents also has a reputation for hitting obstacles at unconventional angles and at higher speeds than other drivers especially during the 2000s. He is known for going into the crowd after a freestyle run and giving his helmet to a fan holding a Max-D related sign.

Meents was the first person to attempt the monster truck backflip. He landed a perfect backflip at his shop in Paxton, Illinois, but the rear king pins broke off. Other than that, it was perfect. When he attempted it in public at the Monster Jam World Finals in 2009, he over-rotated and landed exactly on the tailgate, then rolled over backwards onto the roof.

Meents was the first person to ever attempt a double backflip in Monster Jam. Meents practiced the stunt at the shop, and results were never released to the public. Meents attempted it at MetLife Stadium in East Rutherford, New Jersey on June 16, 2012, but did one backflip in the air and then cork-screwed, landing on the hood of the truck. He completed the first ever double backflip at World Finals 14 during an encore, celebrating the 10 year anniversary of the Maximum Destruction truck.

On May 15, 2015, it was announced that Meents would be attempting a never-before-done front-flip of a Monster Jam truck, which would establish a Guinness World Records title. On June 13, 2015, during Monster Jam Path of Destruction at MetLife Stadium, Meents made history and successfully landed the first frontflip on a monster truck, but just missed establishing a new Guinness World Records title. Meents completed a full forward rotation, landing on Max-D's rear tires, however bounced into an over-rotation so that his front tires did not hit the ground, as required by the Guinness World Records guidelines.

== Awards ==
=== As Driver of Monster Patrol ===
- USHRA U.S. Truck Fest Champion - 1997

=== As Driver of Goldberg ===
- Monster Jam World Finals Racing Champion - 2000, 2001
- Monster Jam World Finals Freestyle Champion - 2001

=== As Driver of Team Meents ===
- Monster Jam World Finals Racing Champion - 2002,
- Monster Jam World Finals Freestyle Champion - 2002,

=== As Driver of Maximum Destruction/Max-D ===
- Monster Jam World Finals Racing Champion - 2009, 2011, 2012
- Monster Jam World Finals Freestyle Champion- 2004, 2006, 2013, 2022
- Monster Jam World Finals Two Wheel Skills Champion - 2019, 2022
- Monster Jam Stadium Series Points Champion - 2019 (Series 1), 2022 (Stadium Series Red)
- Monster Jam Wreck of the year: 2004, 2007, 2011, 2012
- Save of the Year: 2007, 2013, 2014, 2015 (Stadium), 2024
- Wow factor of the year: 2008, 2009
- Donut of the year: 2009, 2016 (Stadium), 2017, 2018
- Crash Madness of the year: 2010, 2012
- Extreme Air of the year: 2021
- Stadium 2-wheel skills of the year: 2023

=== General Awards ===
- Lifetime Achievement award: 2024
