= Indianapolis 500 Legends =

2007 video game

- Developer: Torus Games
- Publisher: Destineer
- Platforms: Wii, Nintendo DS
- Release: Wii: NA: December 14, 2007; DS: NA: December 19, 2007
- Genre: Racing game
- Modes: Single-player, multiplayer

Indianapolis 500 Legends is a racing game recounting the history of the Indianapolis 500. Players take on the roles of various famous racers between 1961 and 1971, completing tasks such as overtaking a specified number of cars or qualifying under a set time. Some missions will change the course of history, such as guiding Parnelli Jones to victory in 1967 when historically, in the 197th lap, a faulty bearing ground his car to a halt. The option is also given to race the full 200 laps. Players are also able to unlock three different '500' racers as they complete their missions under Mission Mode. Some of the missions are: 'epic', 'pit stop', 'race', 'battle', 'qualify', 'dodge' and 'pass'.

== Reception ==
Reception

Aggregate score
Aggregator	Score	
Aggregator	DS	Wii
Metacritic	51/100	47/100

Review scores
Publication	Score	
Publication	DS	Wii
GamePro	N/A	2/5
GamesRadar+	N/A	2.5/5
GameZone	6.3/10	3/10
IGN	5/10	5.8/10
Nintendo World Report	4.5/10	3.5/10

The DS version received "mixed" reviews, while the Wii version received "generally unfavorable reviews", according to the review aggregation website Metacritic.
