= Matchpoint: Tennis Championships =

2022 tennis video game

- Developer: Torus Games
- Publisher: Kalypso Media
- Engine: Unity
- Platforms: Microsoft Windows; PlayStation 4; PlayStation 5; Xbox One; Xbox Series X and Series S; Nintendo Switch
- Release: 7 July 2022: Windows, PlayStation, Xbox; 7 July 2022; Nintendo Switch; 20 October 2022
- Genre: Sports
- Modes: Single-player, multiplayer

Matchpoint: Tennis Championships is a tennis sports video game developed by Australian studio Torus Games and published by Kalypso Media. It was released for Microsoft Windows, PlayStation 4, PlayStation 5, Xbox One, and Xbox Series X and Series S on July 7, 2022, followed by a Nintendo Switch version on October 20, 2022.

The game features a career mode in which players create a tennis player and attempt to reach the top of the world rankings. It also includes exhibition matches, training activities, local multiplayer, and online cross-platform multiplayer. Its roster includes licensed professional tennis players such as Nick Kyrgios, Kei Nishikori, Amanda Anisimova, Daniil Medvedev, Garbiñe Muguruza, and Carlos Alcaraz.

== Gameplay ==
Matchpoint: Tennis Championships is played from a third-person perspective behind the controlled player. The player can perform flat, topspin, slice and lob shots, with additional controls for drop shots and volleys. After selecting a shot, the player uses an aiming marker to choose where the ball should land and can hold the corresponding button to add power.

In the career mode, the player creates a customized competitor and enters tournaments to improve their position in the world rankings. Players can undertake training exercises and choose coaches, rackets and footwear that affect their attributes. The career contains 65 tournaments spread across six continents and 500 computer-controlled opponents with different combinations of strengths and weaknesses. Before playing an opponent, the player can study their characteristics and attempt to exploit their weaknesses during the match.

Outside the career mode, the game includes quick matches, tutorials and training activities. Players can use their customized competitor or select from licensed professional players. Multiplayer is available locally and online, with support for cross-platform play. The game does not include doubles matches.

== Development and release ==
Matchpoint: Tennis Championships was developed by Torus Games, a video game developer based in Australia. According to head of production David McIntosh, the development team initially created a prototype to test its planned gameplay systems before discarding it and rebuilding the game on a stronger foundation. Large portions of the game were subsequently rebuilt as the studio worked to coordinate the animation system with the physics of the tennis ball.

The development team studied slow-motion footage of tennis players to examine their movement and footwork. It divided player movement into two systems: movement while approaching and striking the ball, and movement between shots. Motion-capture production began approximately six months into development and resulted in further changes to the game's systems. Professional tennis players were recorded using an Xsens motion-capture suit, with the team seeking to reproduce smaller movements that are difficult to perceive when watching tennis at normal speed.

In discussing the team's influences, game designer David McIntosh stated that the developers examined earlier tennis video games, including the Top Spin and Tennis Elbow series, but did not want to reproduce their design directly. The studio instead sought to create its own interpretation of the sport, with an emphasis on anticipation, positioning and strategy.

Publisher Kalypso Media announced the game in January 2022 for Windows, PlayStation 4, PlayStation 5, Xbox One, Xbox Series X and Series S, and Nintendo Switch. A Windows demonstration was made available during the February 2022 Steam Next Fest. It included a tutorial, quick-play mode and local multiplayer.

The Windows, PlayStation and Xbox versions were released on 7 July 2022. The game was also made available through Xbox Game Pass and PC Game Pass at launch. The Nintendo Switch version followed on 20 October 2022.

== Reception ==
Reception

Aggregate scores
Aggregator	Score
Metacritic	58/100 (PC)
OpenCritic	60/100

Review score
Publication	Score
IGN	5/10

Matchpoint: Tennis Championships received "mixed or average" reviews, according to review aggregator Metacritic. OpenCritic reported that 15 percent of critics recommended the game.

Critics generally considered the basic tennis mechanics to be the strongest part of the game. Tristan Ogilvie of IGN described its tennis as smooth-playing and simple to control, but found that it was too difficult to miss shots. He criticized the career mode for lacking spectacle and meaningful progression and considered the multiplayer component underdeveloped, particularly because the game did not include doubles.

Sammy Barker of Push Square praised the range of animations and considered the rallies satisfying, observing that the game suffered from less conspicuous animation warping than some other contemporary tennis titles. Barker nevertheless criticized its career mode, artificial intelligence and subdued presentation, concluding that it did not surpass Top Spin 4. In an earlier preview, Barker compared its controls to those of Virtua Tennis, while describing its pace as slower and more realistic.

Richard Seagrave of GameSpew similarly praised the amount of control offered by the aiming system and characterized the game as accessible but difficult to master. He found the on-court action enjoyable but criticized the artificial intelligence, presentation, commentary and limited licensed roster. TheGamer's Lu-Hai Liang described the fundamental tennis as reasonably realistic and noted similarities to Virtua Tennis 2, but criticized the visual presentation, volley mechanics, career structure and repetitiveness.

Other reviewers expressed similar reservations. HobbyConsolas considered the representation of tennis satisfying but found the graphics dated and the career mode repetitive, while The Games Machine praised some of the game's ideas but criticized its artificial intelligence and lack of modes. Jordan Andow of The Outerhaven praised the controls and the flow of rallies, but considered the absence of doubles, limited roster, lack of licensed tournaments and restricted character-creation system to be significant shortcomings.
