= College Slam =

1996 video game

- DOS cover art
- Developers: Iguana UK; Torus Games (Game Boy)
- Publisher: Acclaim Entertainment
- Platforms: Super NES, Genesis, Game Boy, Sega Saturn, PlayStation, MS-DOS
- Release: February 1996
- Genre: Sports
- Modes: Single player Multiplayer

College Slam is a college basketball video game published by Acclaim. It was released for the Super NES, Genesis, Game Boy, Sega Saturn, PlayStation, and PC. It includes most major Division I colleges, but some, such as the University of Tennessee, the University of Notre Dame, and Mississippi State University (who had just made a run to the Final Four that year), are not included. The player can play tournaments, a season, or a single game. Many gaming critics accused it of being a thinly veiled repackaging of NBA Jam.

== Gameplay ==
Each team starts out by picking any two out of five players to play with during the game. During timeouts, and at half-time, the player has a choice to make substitutions. When a player makes two baskets in a row, the announcer says "He's heating up", and if he makes three baskets in a row without the other team scoring, he says "He's on fire!", which makes it easier to score.

In the season mode, the player can pick from 44 teams, and then play a 20-game season against quality competition. In the tournament mode, 16 teams compete for a chance to win the national championship. The player also has the ability to edit teams and players. Like NBA Jam before it, the gameplay is goofy, but yet competitive as players can easily make full-court shots off and on and can score 3 in a row to get a flaming ball. Occasionally the college ball players can get struck by lightning as they dunk.

== Reception ==
The two sports reviewers of Electronic Gaming Monthly gave the PlayStation version scores of 6.0 and 5.5 out of 10. Though they acknowledged that some players would find the college license appealing, they remarked that the game differs too little from NBA Jam to stir real interest, with one of them noting that "Some of the players look exactly the same as they did in Jam except for a color palette change." Tommy Glide and Greasy Gus of GamePro concurred that the game retains the fun of NBA Jam, but that the new alley-oops and player substitutions do not significantly enhance the game, leaving College Slam a pointless clone. Reviewing the Genesis version, a Next Generation critic argued that even the college licensing does nothing for the game, since it does not use real players and in some cases gets the teams' uniform colors wrong. He scored it 2 out of 5 stars.

In 1996, Computer Gaming World declared College Slam the 11th-worst computer game ever released.
