= Operation Shadow =

2004 video game

- PAL cover art
- Developer: Torus Games
- Publisher: Nokia
- Platform: N-Gage
- Release: EU: September 29, 2004; NA: September 30, 2004
- Genre: Action-adventure
- Modes: Single-player, multiplayer

Operation Shadow is a third person action video game released in 2004 for the N-Gage handheld game console. It was developed by Torus Games.

== Story ==
Jay Solano is a military veteran of fifteen years with the special armed forces. During the last five years he was the head of Team Shadow, an elite UN chartered military force used in covert operations around the world. Solano is a physically imposing modern day warrior and is gifted in his ability to command small units. His personal speciality is solo deep incursion operations. He utilizes his outstanding ability to adapt to the constantly changing conditions of covert action and open warfare. This is the "one man army" Jay Solano.

Jay Solano is trained in the use of a wide variety weaponry. Throughout Operation Shadow, Jay will use M16 assault rifles, mounted 30 calibre machine guns, fragmentation grenades, M2-49 Light Anti-tank bazookas, Hydra missiles, multi-fire high explosive anti-tank rocket launchers and many other weapons. In terms of vehicles he will have access to Hum-Vees, hovercraft, tanks and helicopters.

Solano is frequently called upon to squash terrorist uprisings that occur worldwide by using his own brand of vigilante justice. With an impressive track record, Solano has become known as the one to call in when the mission absolutely can not fail. With an insatiable desire for destruction Jay frequently butts heads with General Barton over the balance between caution and just going out and decimating the opposition.

== Reception ==
Reception

Aggregate score
Aggregator	Score
Metacritic	48/100

Review scores
Publication	Score
GameSpot	4.2/10
GameSpy	2/5
GameZone	5.5/10

The game received "generally unfavorable reviews" according to the review aggregation website Metacritic.
