= Shrek Smash n' Crash Racing =

2006 video game

- PAL region PS2 cover art
- Developer: Torus Games
- Publisher: Activision
- Designer: Van Ricketts
- Composer: Finn Robertson
- Platforms: Game Boy Advance, Nintendo DS, GameCube, PlayStation 2, PSP
- Release: PlayStation 2: NA: November 14, 2006; EU: February 9, 2007; AU: February 14, 2007; Game Boy Advance: NA: November 15, 2006; EU: February 6, 2007; AU: February 14, 2007; GameCube: NA: November 21, 2006; FR/DE: February 9, 2007; PlayStation Portable: NA: December 12, 2006; EU: February 16, 2007; AU: March 14, 2007; Nintendo DS: NA: March 6, 2007; AU: March 14, 2007; EU: March 16, 2007
- Genre: Racing
- Modes: Single-player, multiplayer

Shrek Smash n' Crash Racing is a kart racing video game released in November 2006. The game is based on the Shrek franchise. Players have the option of playing one of twelve Shrek characters, using racing and combat skills to defeat other racers. It was released for the GameCube, PlayStation 2, PlayStation Portable, Nintendo DS, and Game Boy Advance systems. Shrek Smash n' Crash Racing was the final game based on a DreamWorks Animation film to be released on the GameCube.

The original music for the game was composed by Finn Robertson.

== Gameplay ==
Shrek Smash n' Crash Racing is a kart racing video game. The players first must pick from a line up of twelve different characters from the Shrek universe. The maximum number of racers on a track at any one time is six. Each of the characters have special stats that are not displayed in the game. Any other non player racers will be controlled by the computer and chosen at random.

Then, the player has the option to pick the track or cup tournament they want to play on. Once the track is chosen, then the race will begin. The objective of the races is to win in first place. On the tracks are item barrels that contains items inside of them. The items are used as an advantage to help the racer.

The tracks are also filled with obstacles and shortcuts that can either help or harm the racers. On the track, characters also have a special item that can be used to attack other karts or obstacles. If another racer is hit by a special item then they will spin out. The characters also can jump to avoid obstacles or reach other parts of the track. The racer that wins first place in either tournament mode or a regular race then gets to the trophy.

=== Characters & karts ===
The game features 12 playable characters total, with 8 of these needing to be unlocked through gameplay progression. Each character has their own kart to drive in with each one being a vehicle or animal.

- Donkey - Dragon
- Gingy - Cupcake Horse
- Goldilocks^{U} - Papa Bear
- Humpty Dumpty^{U} - Chicken Cup
- Little Red Riding Hood^{U} - Big Bad Wolf
- Pinocchio^{U} - Puppet Horse
- Prince Charming^{U} - Stallion
- Princess Fiona - Onion Carriage
- Puss in Boots^{U} - Bull
- Shrek - Swamp Smasher
- Three Little Pigs^{U} - Flying Magic Carpet
- Thelonious^{U} (henchman of Lord Farquaad from Shrek) - Black Horse

^U Unlockable characters

== Reception ==
Reception

Aggregate score
Aggregator	Score
GameRankings	(GC) 59% (PS2) 51.4% (GBA) 50% (DS) 43%

Review score
Publication	Score
IGN	5.9/10 (GBA) 5/10 (DS) 4/10

Upon release, the PS2 and GameCube versions received “average” reviews, while the GBA version received mixed reviews and the DS version received negative reviews. GameRankings gave it a score of 59% for the GameCube version; 51.4% for the PlayStation 2 version; 50% for the Game Boy Advance version; and 43% for the DS version.
