= Rise of the Guardians: The Video Game =

2012 video game

- Developer: Torus Games
- Publishers: NA: D3 Publisher; PAL: Namco Bandai Games
- Platforms: PlayStation 3, Xbox 360, Wii, Wii U, Nintendo DS, Nintendo 3DS
- Release: NA: 20 November 2012; EU: 23 November 2012; AU: 29 November 2012; Wii U: NA: 4 December 2012; AU: 13 December 2012; EU: 14 December 2012
- Genre: Action-adventure
- Modes: Single-player, multiplayer

Rise of the Guardians is a 2012 action-adventure game based on the film of the same name. It is developed by Torus Games and published by D3 Publisher in the United States and Namco Bandai Games in Europe. The game was released on 20 November 2012 in North America and 23 November 2012 in Europe for PlayStation 3, Xbox 360, Wii, Nintendo DS, and Nintendo 3DS; and on 4 December 2012 in North America and 14 December 2012 in Europe for Wii U.

== Gameplay ==
The player is able to play as Jack Frost with the help of Santa Claus, the Tooth Fairy, the Easter Bunny, and Sandy as they battle the bogeyman Pitch Black and his Nightmare minions in order to restore world belief in the Guardians.

The game features drop-in/drop-out cooperative play for up to four players, as well as a levelling system that allows the player to unlock greater attacks and special team moves.

== Reception ==
Reception

Aggregate scores
Aggregator	Score
GameRankings	(Wii U) 48% (X360) 40% (Wii) 38%
Metacritic	(Wii U) 48/100 (X360) 43/100 (PS3) 35/100 (3DS) 10/100

Review scores
Publication	Score
4Players	52%
Game Informer	(X360) 6.5/10
Gamekult	(PS3) 3/10
GameRevolution	(Wii U) 6/10
Jeuxvideo.com	5/20
Nintendo Life	(Wii U) 3/10 (3DS) 1/10
Nintendo World Report	(Wii U) 6/10
Official Nintendo Magazine	(Wii U) 40%
Official Xbox Magazine (UK)	(X360) 3/10
The Digital Fix	(X360) 3/10

The game received "generally unfavourable reviews" on all platforms except the 3DS version, which received "overwhelming dislike", according to the review aggregation website Metacritic.
