= Scooby-Doo! and the Spooky Swamp =

2010 video game

- North American PlayStation 2 cover art
- Developer: Torus Games
- Publisher: Warner Bros. Interactive Entertainment
- Platforms: Wii, Nintendo DS, PlayStation 2, Microsoft Windows
- Release: NA: September 14, 2010; AU: September 29, 2010; EU: October 15, 2010
- Genre: Action
- Modes: Single-player, multiplayer

Scooby-Doo! and the Spooky Swamp is a third person platform video game developed by Torus Games and published by Warner Bros. Interactive Entertainment for the PlayStation 2, Wii, and Nintendo DS consoles and also for Microsoft Windows. The game was first released on September 14, 2010, in North America and was released in the following weeks in PAL regions. It is the fifth Scooby-Doo! video game title to come to sixth generation consoles. The game is a follow-up to Scooby-Doo! First Frights.

== Plot summary ==
Shaggy and Scooby-Doo, as hungry as always, venture into the swamp following a scent. There they meet swamp resident Lila, an intelligent girl who loves cooking, and asks them to recover ingredients to finish her stew. Before leaving, Lila insists that they do not tell their friends about her. Shaggy and Scooby set off with the gang to solve two mysteries while secretly collecting the ingredients.

After collecting that last ingredient, Velma catches them and the rest of the gang go with them to meet Lila. A giant alligator ambushes them, but Scooby and Shaggy manage to defeat it. The gang discover that Lila manipulated them into going to the two locations where the ingredients that she needed are and didn't interact with them because she was worried that they wouldn't believe her. The true reason behind the stew was to give to her pet alligator Suji (the monster that Shaggy and Scooby fought), who is just being protective of her, so they can leave the swamp and reunite with Lila's family. Before leaving, Lila provides a feast for Shaggy and Scooby to enjoy.

== Gameplay ==
Just like First Frights, the player controls the five members of the Mystery Inc, and the gameplay and interface are highly reminiscent of TT Games' Lego game series. The game has light puzzle elements, platforming, and combat. The primary goal of the game is to solve mysteries and find ingredients to Lila's stew. Each character of the gang has different skills and functions. The game contains many collectibles, including: ingredients for a hoagie, the letters of 'Scooby', Scooby-Doo's collar medallion, ghost photographs, and costumes. Collectibles, options, cheat codes, rewards and more can be accessed in the Swamp's Clubhouse. By defeating enemies, small masks are collected; upon reaching a specified number of masks, the information about the equivalent enemy are shown in the Clubhouse. The player can get trophies for doing certain tasks. The player can also play with a friend in multiplayer co-operation.

In addition to Lila's swamp, players assist characters in two other locations, El Muncho, a Southwestern ghost town, and Howling Peaks, a snowy alpine village. In El Muncho, the citizens are frightened by "El Scaryachi," and the Scooby gang must help Costington (a character from First Frights), twins Emilio and Esteban, and a secret spy named Romero. In Howling Peaks, the locals are frightened by a yeti, and the gang must help Daphne's cousin Anna (who also appeared in First Frights), snowboarder Moose, Dustin "Cranky" Planks, Barry "Baz" Buckley, and Sergio (who is unseen). Throughout the game, the player will occasionally encounter a talking frog named Philippe Extraordinare, who will either give them tips or comedy.

== Reception ==
Reception

Aggregate scores
| Aggregator | Score |
|---|---|
| GameRankings | (Wii) 68.88% |
| Metacritic | (Wii) 76/100 |

Review scores
| Publication | Score |
|---|---|
| Nintendo Life | (Wii) 7/10 (DS) 5/10 |
| Nintendo World Report | (Wii) 9/10 (DS) 6.5/10 |

Scooby-Doo! and the Spooky Swamp was met with mixed reception according to review aggregators Metacritic and GameRankings, with average ratings of 68.88% and 76/100 for the Wii version.
