= Torus Games =

Defunct Australian video game developer

- Founded: 1994; 32 years ago
- Founder: Bill McIntosh
- Defunct: March 2024
- Fate: Closed (had layoffs)
- Headquarters: Bayswater, Victoria, Australia
- Website: torus.com.au

Torus Games was an Australian video game developer founded in 1994 by Bill McIntosh. The company was located in Bayswater, Victoria. Its managing director is Bill McIntosh. The company was a family business. Torus has developed over 145 titles. The company is most known for family action/adventure games, based on well-known licenses.

== History ==
Torus began developing their first game in 1994, a Game Boy and Game Gear game based on the film Stargate, published by Acclaim Entertainment.

Torus has a single, scalable cross-platform game engine. The Torus game engine runs on consoles, handhelds (including those without floating point support) and mobile phones, and their unified asset pipeline allows Torus to deliver the same game from the same common code-base across all hardware platforms. Torus Games also use the Unreal and Unity engines, depending on the type of project they are developing.

In 2015, Torus Games were awarded the Disney Developer of the Year Award for their efforts on Disney's Imagicademy initiative. They also launched their first original iOS and Android game, Crystal Crusade, followed by Flipper Fox and Heidi Price and the Orient Express in 2016.

In the late 2010s, the company partnered with Monash University to develop an educational tool assisting children with reduced attention spans. Project TALI has scope to become a screening tool, allowing for the possibility of earlier cognitive training for children with learning difficulties.

In March 2024, it was reported that the company had been "effectively shuttered" with no projects in the pipeline and no employees except for McIntosh left. McIntosh described the studio as being in "hibernation".

== Games ==
PlayStation 5

- Lego 2K Drive (2K) (2023)
- Matchpoint: Tennis Championships (Kalypso Media) (2022)
- World War Z (Saber Interactive) (2022)

Xbox Series X/S

- Lego 2K Drive (2K) (2023)
- Matchpoint: Tennis Championships (Kalypso Media) (2022)
- World War Z (Saber Interactive) (2022)

Google Stadia

- World War Z (Saber Interactive) (2022)

PlayStation 4

- Lego 2K Drive (2K) (2023)
- Matchpoint: Tennis Championships (Kalypso Media) (2022)
- World War Z (Saber Interactive) (2022)
- Praetorians (Kalypso Media) (2020)
- Beast Quest (Maximum Games) (2018)
- Hotel Transylvania 3: Monsters Overboard (Outright Games) (2018)
- PAW Patrol: On a Roll (Outright Games) (2018)
- Beast Quest (Maximum Games) (2018)
- Ben 10 (Outright Games) (2017)

Xbox One

- Lego 2K Drive (2K) (2023)
- Matchpoint: Tennis Championships (Kalypso Media) (2022)
- World War Z (Saber Interactive) (2022)
- Praetorians (Kalypso Media) (2020)
- Beast Quest (Maximum Games) (2018)
- Hotel Transylvania 3: Monsters Overboard (Outright Games) (2018)
- Paw Patrol: On a Roll (Outright Games) (2018)
- Beast Quest (Maximum Games) (2018)
- Ben 10 (Outright Games) (2017)

Nintendo Switch

- Cartoon Network: Battle Crashers (GameMill Entertainment/Maximum Games) (2017)
- Hotel Transylvania 3: Monsters Overboard (Outright Games) (2018)
- Paw Patrol: On a Roll (Outright Games) (2018)
- World War Z (Saber Interactive) (2022)
- Matchpoint: Tennis Championships (Kalypso Media) (2022)
- Lego 2K Drive (2K) (2023)

PlayStation 3

- Barbie and her Sisters: Puppy Rescue (Little Orbit) (2015)
- Monster High: New Ghoul in School (Little Orbit) (2015)
- How to Train Your Dragon 2 (Little Orbit) (2014)
- Falling Skies (Little Orbit) (2014)
- Rise of the Guardians: The Video Game (D3 Publisher) (2012)

Xbox 360

- Barbie and her Sisters: Puppy Rescue (Little Orbit) (2015)
- Monster High: New Ghoul in School (Little Orbit) (2015)
- How to Train Your Dragon 2 (Little Orbit) (2014)
- Falling Skies (Little Orbit) (2014)
- Rise of the Guardians: The Video Game (D3 Publisher) (2012)
- Monster Jam (Activision) (2007)

Wii U

- Barbie and her Sisters: Puppy Rescue (Little Orbit) (2015)
- Monster High: New Ghoul in School (Little Orbit) (2015)
- Penguins of Madagascar (Little Orbit) (2014)
- How to Train Your Dragon 2 (Little Orbit) (2014)
- Falling Skies (Little Orbit) (2014)
- How to Train Your Dragon 2 (Little Orbit) (2014)
- Barbie: Dreamhouse Party (Little Orbit) (2013)
- The Croods: Prehistoric Party (D3 Publisher) (2013)
- Rise of the Guardians: The Video Game (D3 Publisher) (2012)

Wii

- Barbie and her Sisters: Puppy Rescue (Little Orbit) (2015)
- Monster High: New Ghoul in School (Little Orbit) (2015)
- Penguins of Madagascar (Little Orbit) (2014)
- How to Train Your Dragon 2 (Little Orbit) (2014)
- Barbie: Dreamhouse Party (Little Orbit) (2013)
- Combo Pack: The Croods: Prehistoric Party and Rise of the Guardians (D3 Publisher) (2013)
- Turbo: Super Stunt Squad (D3 Publisher) (2013)
- The Croods: Prehistoric Party (D3 Publisher) (2013)
- Rise of the Guardians: The Video Game (D3 Publisher) (2012)
- Bigfoot: King of Crush (Zoo Entertainment) (2011)
- Stunt Flyer: Hero of the Skies (Just A Game GmbH) (2011) (Region 2 only)
- Scooby-Doo! and the Spooky Swamp (Warner Bros. Interactive) (2010)
- Kid Adventures: Sky Captain (D3 Publisher) (2010)
- Scooby-Doo! First Frights (Warner Bros. Interactive) (2009)
- Monster Jam: Urban Assault (Activision) (2008)
- Zoo Hospital (Majesco) (2008)
- Monster Jam (Activision) (2007)
- Indianapolis 500 Legends (Destineer) (2007)

Nintendo 3DS

- Fireman Sam: to the Rescue (Avanquest) (2015) (Region 2 only)
- Thomas & Friends: Steaming Around Sodor (Avanquest) (2015) (Region 2 only)
- Mike the Knight and the Great Gallop (Avanquest) (2015) (Region 2 only)
- Barbie and her Sisters: Puppy Rescue (Little Orbit) (2015)
- Monster High: New Ghoul in School (Little Orbit) (2015)
- Penguins of Madagascar (Little Orbit) (2014)
- How to Train Your Dragon 2 (Little Orbit) (2014)
- Barbie: Dreamhouse Party (Little Orbit) (2013)
- Combo Pack: The Croods: Prehistoric Party and Madagascar 3 (D3 Publisher) (2013)
- Turbo: Super Stunt Squad (D3 Publisher) (2013)
- The Croods: Prehistoric Party (D3 Publisher) (2013)
- Rise of the Guardians: The Video Game (D3 Publisher) (2012)
- Madagascar 3: The Video Game (D3 Publisher) (2012)

Nintendo DS

- Monster High: 13 Wishes (Little Orbit) (2013)
- Barbie: Dreamhouse Party (Little Orbit) (2013)
- Combo Pack: The Croods: Prehistoric Party and Madagascar 3 (D3 Publisher) (2013)
- Turbo: Super Stunt Squad (D3 Publisher) (2013)
- The Croods: Prehistoric Party (D3 Publisher) (2013)
- Rise of the Guardians: The Video Game (D3 Publisher) (2012)
- Madagascar 3: The Video Game (D3 Publisher) (2012)
- Scooby-Doo! and the Spooky Swamp (Warner Bros. Interactive) (2010)
- Scooby-Doo! First Frights (Warner Bros. Interactive) (2009)
- Crystal Mines (Home Entertainment Suppliers) (2009) (Region 4 only)
- Backyard Football 2009 (Atari) (2008)
- Monster Jam: Urban Assault (Activision) (2008)
- Zoo Hospital (Majesco) (2008)
- Backyard Football 2008 (Atari) (2007)
- Monster Jam (game) (Activision) (2007)
- Indianapolis 500 Legends (Destineer) (2007)
- Spider-Man: Battle for New York (Activision) (2006)
- Shrek Smash n' Crash Racing (Activision) (2006)

iOS

- Flipper Fox (Celago) (2016)
- Heidi Price and the Orient Express (Celago) (2016), (Calypso Entertainment) (2017)
- Crystal Crusade (Celago) (2015)
- Mickey's Shapes Sing-Along (Disney) (2015)
- Mickey's Magical Math World (Disney) (2015)
- Falling Skies Planetary Warfare (Little Orbit) (2014)
- Save Your Legs (RKPix) (2012)

Android

- Flipper Fox (Celago) (2016)
- Heidi Price and the Orient Express (Celago) (2016)
- Crystal Crusade (Celago) (2015)
- Mickey's Super Rocket Shapes (Disney) (2015)
- Falling Skies Planetary Warfare (Little Orbit) (2014)

Microsoft Windows

- Lego 2K Drive (2K) (2023)
- World War Z (Saber Interactive) (2022)
- Matchpoint: Tennis Championships (Kalypso Media) (2022)
- Praetorians (Kalypso Media) (2020)
- Hotel Transylvania 3: Monsters Overboard (Outright Games) (2018)
- Paw Patrol: On a Roll (Outright Games) (2018)
- Ben 10 (Outright Games) (2017)
- Barbie and her Sisters: Puppy Rescue (Little Orbit) (2015)
- Monster High: New Ghoul in School (Little Orbit) (2015)
- Falling Skies (Little Orbit) (2014)
- Barbie: Dreamhouse Party (Little Orbit) (2013)
- Scooby-Doo! and the Spooky Swamp (Warner Bros. Interactive) (2012)
- Scooby-Doo! First Frights (Warner Bros. Interactive) (2011)
- Monster Jam (Activision) (2007)
- Squatter: The Classic Australian Game (HES) (1999)
- Carmageddon TDR 2000 (SCi) (2000)
- Dick Johnson V8 Challenge (HES) (1999)
- Le Mans 24 Hours (Infogrames) (2002) - Ported for Infogrames Melbourne House

PlayStation 2

- Scooby-Doo! and the Spooky Swamp (Warner Bros. Interactive) (2010)
- Scooby-Doo! First Frights (Warner Bros. Interactive) (2009)
- Monster Jam: Urban Assault (Activision) (2008)
- Monster Jam (Activision) (2007)
- Indianapolis 500 Legends (Destineer) (2008)
- Shrek Smash n' Crash Racing (Activision) (2006)
- Grand Prix Challenge (Infogrames) (2002) - Supplied art for tracks of Silverstone (UK), Magny-Cours (France) and Montreal (Canada)

PlayStation Portable

- Monster Jam: Urban Assault (Activision) (2008)
- Shrek Smash n' Crash Racing (Activision) (2006)

Xbox

- Classified: The Sentinel Crisis (Global Star) (2005)

GameCube

- Shrek Smash n' Crash Racing (Activision) (2006)

Game Boy Advance

- Backyard Sports Football 2007 (Atari) (2006)
- Spider-Man: Battle for New York (Activision) (2006)
- Shrek Smash n' Crash Racing (Activision) (2006)
- Curious George (Namco) (2006)
- Fantastic Four (Activision) (2005)
- Backyard Football 2006 (Atari) (2005)
- Sportsmans Pack 2 in 1 (Activision) (2005)
- Gumby vs the Astrobots (Namco) (2005)
- Fantastic 4 (Activision) (2005)
- Dead to Rights (Namco) (2004)
- Cabela's Big Game Hunter 2005 Adventures (Activision) (2004)
- Rapala Pro Fishing (Activision) (2004)
- Ice Nine (BAM! Entertainment) (2003)
- Pitfall: The Lost Expedition (Activision) (2003)
- Backyard Football (Atari) (2003)
- Space Invaders (Activision) (2002)
- The Invincible Iron Man (Activision) (2002)
- Duke Nukem Advance (Activision) (2002)
- Doom II (Activision) (2002)
- Minority Report: Everybody Runs (Activision) (2002)
- Jackie Chan Adventures: Legend of the Dark Hand (Activision) (2001)
- Planet of the Apes (Ubisoft) (2001)

Game Boy Color

- Planet of the Apes (Ubisoft) (2001)
- Spider-Man 2: The Sinister Six (Activision) (2001)
- The Lion King: Simba's Mighty Adventure (Activision) (2000)
- NBA Hoopz (Midway) (2000)
- NBA Showtime: NBA on NBC (Midway) (2000)
- Star Wars: Yoda Stories (THQ) (1999)
- Duke Nukem (GT Interactive) (1999)
- Hello Kitty's Cube Frenzy (NewKidCo) (1999)
- NBA Jam 99 (Acclaim) (1999)

Game Boy

- Beavis and Butt-Head (GT Interactive) (1999)
- NBA Jam Tournament Edition (Acclaim) (1998)
- DragonHeart: Fire & Steel (Acclaim) (1996)
- College Slam (Acclaim) (1995)
- Stargate (Acclaim) (1994)
- The Lost World: Jurassic Park (THQ) (1997)

Game Gear

- Stargate (Acclaim) (1995)

N-Gage

- Ashen (Nokia) (2004)
- Operation Shadow (Nokia (2004)'

Didj

- Didj Racing: Tiki Tropics (LeapFrog Enterprises) (2008)

Leapster 2

- Go, Diego, Go! Animal Rescuer (LeapFrog Enterprises/Nickelodeon) (2008) port
- CARS Supercharged (LeapFrog Enterprises/Disney) (2008) port
- Sonic X (LeapFrog Enterprises/4Kids Entertainment) (2008) port
- Cars (LeapFrog Enterprises/Disney) (2008) port

Leapster

- Go, Diego, Go! Animal Rescuer (LeapFrog Enterprises/Nickelodeon) (2007)
- Cars Supercharged (LeapFrog Enterprises/Disney) (2007)
- Sonic X (LeapFrog Enterprises/4Kids Entertainment) (2007)
- NASCAR (LeapFrog Enterprises/NASCAR) (2005)
- Counting on Zero (LeapFrog Enterprises) (2005)
- Cars (LeapFrog Enterprises/Disney) (2006)
