= Classified: The Sentinel Crisis =

2005 video game

- Developer: Torus Games
- Publisher: Global Star Software
- Engine: RenderWare
- Platform: Xbox
- Release: EU: 24 June 2005; NA: 13 April 2006
- Genre: First-person shooter
- Mode: Single-player

Classified: The Sentinel Crisis is a 2005 first-person shooter video game developed by Torus Games and published by Global Star Software for the Xbox. The player takes the role of a super-soldier with "intelligent" military technology created under the titular Sentinel Project. In contrast to other first-person shooters with multiple weapons, the game features a single weapon, a "multi-function rifle", that is slowly upgraded over the course of the game. The game was developed by Australian studio Torus Games, who created the game in a compressed timeframe and experienced difficulties developing for the Xbox. Upon release, Classified received generally negative reviews from critics, with focus directed towards limitations of the game's level design, weapons and enemy behaviours.

== Plot ==
Classified places the player in the role of Collins, a Black Ops soldier recruited for the military's Sentinel Project. Sentinel soldiers are super-soldiers equipped with new technologies, including an "intelligent" Sentinel suit and multifunction rifle. The player is dispatched to Eastern Europe to locate Landau, a scientist responsible for the creation of the Sentinel technology. Landau is believed to have been kidnapped by Radulov, a powerful and dangerous Eastern European general. The player forms an alliance with Karlo, the leader of a revolutionary movement. Upon discovering Landau, it is discovered that he is a traitor who plans on manufacturing his technology in an underground installation. Evading capture, the player eventually executes Radulov from a distance before regrouping with Karlo and his men to stop Landau. In the ensuing battle, Karlo is killed in action, and the player survives to lead his organisation and kill Landau, who has created an upgraded and superior re-energizing suit.

== Gameplay ==
A screenshot of gameplay in Classified: The Sentinel Crisis

Classified is a first-person shooter in which the player is a super-soldier enhanced with several abilities that assist in gameplay. The player is equipped with a single "multi-function" rifle that is equipped with additional capabilities throughout the course of the game by collecting briefcases, including add-ons that allow the rifle to shoot grenades and rockets, shotgun shells and sniper bullets, and upgrades that increase the size of the magazine clip. Once collected, the player is able to alternate between the weapon modes. The player is also enhanced with several vision modes, including night vision in dark environments, and an enemy detection mode is used to provide a layout for where enemies are located in an area. The multi-function suit also contains information about shields and health points. Throughout levels, the player is tasked to complete similar objectives, guided by a directional arrow, including recovering a package, bombing a location, or rescuing a hostage.

== Development ==
Classified was developed by Torus Games, an Australian development company based in Melbourne. Development on Classified was the first and only Xbox title and first-person shooter game developed by the company. Production of the title was troubled, with production lead Kevin McIntosh stating that the game had a "super short timeframe" for creation due to having moved into a new studio, and the team "had some difficulties with the (Xbox) hardware for a few more weeks after the other platforms were complete". Eventually, the PlayStation 2 version was cancelled for unknown reasons.

== Reception ==
Reception

Aggregate score
Aggregator	Score
Metacritic	41/100

Review scores
Publication	Score
GameSpot	5.4/10
IGN	2.1/10
Official Xbox Magazine (UK)	48%
Official Xbox Magazine (US)	2/10
TeamXbox	5.9/10

Classified received "generally unfavorable" reviews, according to review aggregator Metacritic. Reviewers critiqued the game's generic level design and enemies. Describing the level design as "back and forth", Official Xbox Magazine wrote that the game's mission objectives were "cliche". IGN similarly noted that the "level design and objectives are extremely dull" and confined to several similar tasks. TeamXbox noted that the gameplay involved "dispatching wave after wave of baddies", remarking that the result was "not a whole lot of fun" and "doesn't differentiate itself from any of the other first-person shooters" on the console. GameSpot noted that "the missions are just dull", writing that "there's no creativity to any single element of (the) missions, and because of that, you'll be bored with the experience almost immediately." Critics also observed that the enemy behaviour contributed to the poor design of the levels. Writing that "any kind of engaging gameplay is ruined by poor enemy AI", IGN noted how the enemies "either charge directly at you or stay put, making it really, really boring to fight them". Digital Press noted that enemies tend to "stand and shoot" and "rarely mix things up", creating a "complete lack of challenge".

The game's weapons and control system were also critiqued, with many critics questioning the decision to feature a single weapon in the game. IGN noted that the "exceedingly slight visual differences between the weapon variations" limited the game's variety, writing "you're going to be using the same weapon with the fire button constantly pressed". Team Xbox described the system as lacking "auto-aim" or weapon weight or recoil, observing that "many shots won't find their mark which also makes ammo conservation a bit more of an issue than it should be." Official Xbox Magazine faulted the game's "cockeyed" control system, writing that the game featured "terrible movement and gun recoil controls" and that the player's speed "bizarrely halves" when moving diagonally. Digital Press described controlling the player character as a "chore", writing that "aiming is completely inaccurate, and landing a quick kill is entirely based on luck." GameSpot wrote that "there's just no impact behind the shots, no matter which gun you use", describing the explosive weapons as "bizarrely underwhelming".
