= Anne Thaxter Eaton =

American author, book reviewer and children's librarian (1881–1971)

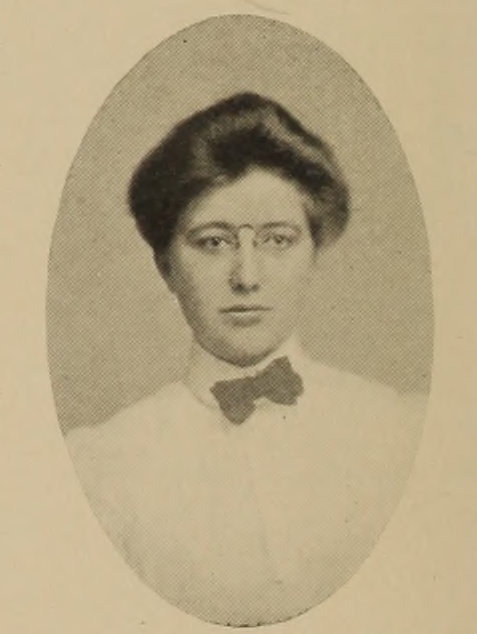
Anne Thaxter Eaton

Anne Thaxter Eaton (May 8, 1881 – May 5, 1971) was an American author, book reviewer and children's librarian. She served as a children's book reviewer at The New York Times.

== Biography ==
Born on May 8, 1881, in Beverly, Massachusetts, Anne Thaxter Eaton was the daughter of Charles Henry and his wife Jane M. Eaton. She grew up in New York. She received a B.A. from Smith College in Massachusetts in the early 1900s. In 1906 she graduated with a bachelor's degree in library science from New York State Library School at Albany. After twenty years, in 1926, she also obtained a master's degree from the same school.

After graduation, in 1906, she started her professional career as a librarian at the Pruyn Library in Albany. Between 1910 and 1917, she served as an assistant librarian at the library of the University of Tennessee at Knoxville, Tennessee. She later returned to New York to become the librarian of the newly founded Lincoln School of the Teachers' College at New York's Columbia University, and continued until her retirement in 1946.

In 1932 Eaton became a children's book reviewer at The New York Times, where a children's book review page was fortnightly published since 1930. From 1935 to 1946, she served as the co-editor of the children's department of The New York Times along with its own staff Ellen Lewis Buell.

She also served as a volunteer in St. Luke's School Library for a period of more than two decades. In 1946, she retired from The New York Times at the age of 65, being replaced by Buell.

She died on May 5, 1971, in New York.

== Publications ==
Besides her extensive review of children's books, Eaton wrote a number of textbooks and articles. She also compiled reading lists and anthologies. Some of her publications include

- On Reading Aloud (1923)
- Reading without Boundaries (1956)
- Reading with Children (1940)
- Treasure for the Taking: A Book List for Boys and Girls (1956)
- The Animals’ Christmas: Poems, Carols, and Stories (1944)
- Welcome Christmas!: A Garland of Poems (1955).
