= World War Z (2019 video game) =

Third-person shooter video game

- Developer: Saber Interactive
- Publisher: Saber Interactive (Note: The game was formerly published by Focus Home Interactive and Mad Dog Games.)
- Director: Dmitriy Grigorenko
- Producers: Alexandr Ermakov; Alexey Tkachev
- Designers: Anatolii Koruka; Pavel Ryazantsev; Sergei Danchenko
- Artist: Petr Kudryashov
- Writers: Craig Sherman; Oliver Hollis-Leick
- Composer: Steve Molitz
- Engine: Swarm Engine
- Platforms: Microsoft Windows; PlayStation 4; Xbox One; Nintendo Switch; Google Stadia; PlayStation 5; Xbox Series X/S
- Release: Windows, PS4, Xbox One; 16 April 2019; Nintendo Switch 2 November 2021; Google Stadia 5 April 2022 PS5, Xbox Series X/S 24 January 2023
- Genres: Third-person shooter, first-person shooter
- Modes: Single-player, multiplayer

World War Z is a third-person shooter video game developed and published by Saber Interactive. It was released for Microsoft Windows, PlayStation 4 and Xbox One on 16 April 2019; a Nintendo Switch version was released on 2 November 2021. It was released for Google Stadia on 5 April 2022. Ports for PlayStation 5 and Xbox Series X/S released on 24 January 2023. Loosely based on the 2006 novel World War Z and set in the same universe as the 2013 film adaptation, the game follows groups of four survivors of a zombie apocalypse.

== Gameplay ==
World War Z utilizes the Swarm Engine which enables the game to render large hordes of zombies.

The game is a co-operative third-person shooter in which four players fight against massive hordes of zombies in nine locations, including New York, Jerusalem, Moscow, Tokyo, Marseille, Rome, Kamchatka, Phoenix and Las Vegas. Each location, or episode as it is known in-game, is divided into 3-5 individual levels. After completing a level, players receive "supplies" based on a resulting defeat or victory. Supplies can be used to upgrade weapons and unlock new attachments. Perks can be bought for specific classes using supplies.

Players can choose from eight classes: the Gunslinger (specializes in range), the Hellraiser (specializes in explosives), the Fixer (engineer), the Medic (healer), the Slasher (specializes in melee), the Exterminator (specializes in crowd control), the Dronemaster (support) and Vanguard (defense). New perks can be unlocked for each class as players continue progressing in the game.

The game can support up to 1,000 enemies appearing on-screen simultaneously, and they can climb onto each other to reach players on a higher level. Players can collect different items in the battlefield, but their locations are procedurally generated. In addition to fighting zombies, players need to complete different objectives, such as escorting survivors, in each location.

The game features five competitive multiplayer modes. The Player vs Player vs Zombie mode pits two teams of players against each other while the zombie hordes attack both teams.

== Development ==
Approximately 100 people of Saber Interactive worked on the game. The studio decided to use the World War Z license for the game as they felt that there were too many risks involved in marketing a new intellectual property. Matt Karch, CEO of Saber Interactive, described the game as the combination of both the 2013 film and the 2006 novel. Gerry Lane, the character played by Brad Pitt from the 2013 film, does not appear in the game as the team opted to include multiple survivors who have their own stories. The team took inspiration from The Chronicles of Riddick: Escape from Butcher Bay when they were exploring how they could incorporate elements from the film and the book into the game. Left 4 Dead also inspired the developer when they were crafting the game's gameplay. A proprietary game engine named the Swarm Engine was used to power the game and render the huge zombie hordes. The Swarm Engine is purposefully built to handle up to 500 zombies on the screen at one time.

The game was announced at The Game Awards 2017. The game was released on 19 April 2019 for Microsoft Windows, PlayStation 4 and Xbox One. Focus Home Interactive and Mad Dog Games served as the title's distributor. It was an Epic Games Store exclusive. Saber planned to support the game by introducing more episodes, characters, settings, and competitive game modes, after the game's launch.

=== Post-release content ===
World War Z is supported with regular updates, patches, new episodes including major content for horde mode and hub fixed, most of them being free.

A Game of the Year Edition was released on 5 May 2020, and includes new weapon and character packs, a new three-mission PvE episode set in Marseille, France, as well as all previously released downloadable content. Alongside the reveal of the Game of the Year Edition, a Nintendo Switch port was announced. Matt Karch, the CEO of developer Saber Interactive, called getting the game to run on Nintendo's console "the hardest thing that we have had to do". It was released on 2 November 2021.

An upgraded version of the game titled Aftermath, which includes the Game of the Year Edition and introduces three new locations (Marseille, Rome, and the Kamchatka peninsula in Russia), new characters, a revamped melee system and a first-person mode, was released on 21 September 2021.

== Reception ==
Reception

Aggregate score
Aggregator	Score
Metacritic	PC: 70/100; PS4: 67/100; XONE: 73/100; NS: 69/100

Review scores
Publication	Score
Destructoid	7.5/10
Game Informer	8.25/10
Jeuxvideo.com	14/20
Push Square	6/10

According to review aggregator Metacritic, the game received "mixed or average reviews" from critics. Game Informer compared it to Left 4 Dead series and praised its shooting mechanics, visuals and story, but criticized its soundtrack and lack of non-vocal player interactions.

It was the best-selling retail game in the UK in its week of release. As of 23 April 2019, more than 1 million units of the game have been sold. It sold almost 2 million copies in the first month after the release. In Japan, the PlayStation 4 version of World War Z sold 27,872 copies within its first week of release in September 2019, placing it at number seven on the all format video game sales chart.

As of October 2019, more than 3 million units have been sold. According to Tim Willits, the game had attracted more than 30 million players by September 2026.

== Adaptation ==
A pinball table based on the game was released by Zen Studios for Pinball FX on 21 April 2022. It was the first table on that platform to incorporate video footage from another video game, although DMD animations had previously been used in a few tables for Pinball FX3. At the time of release Zen Studios was part of Saber Interactive.
