= El Toro Loco =

2001 American monster truck

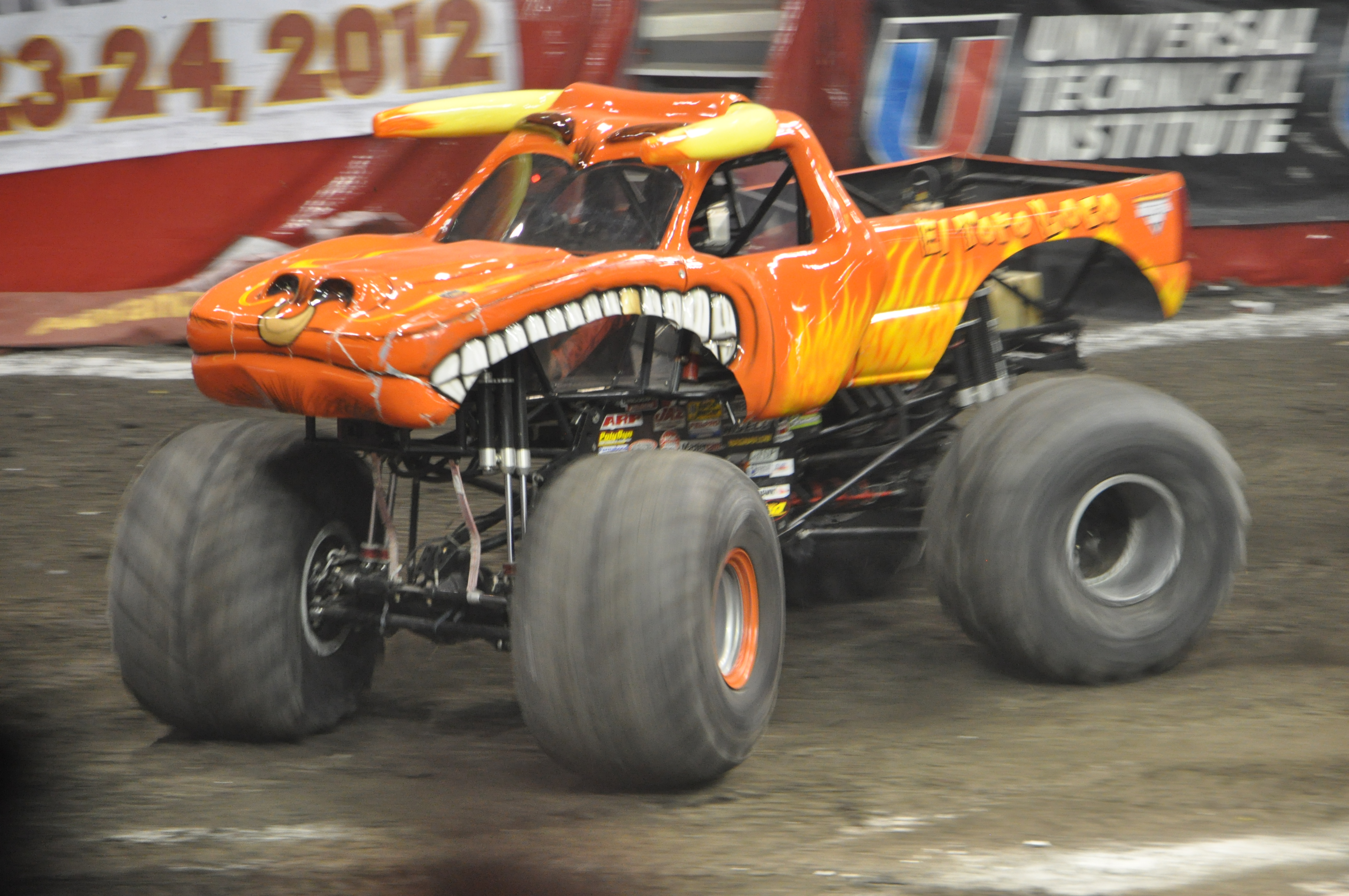
- El Toro Loco at Allstate Arena in 2012

Owner and driver information
- Owner: FELD Motorsports
- Driver(s): Armando Castro, Jamey Garner, MJ Solorio, Fernando Martinez, Joe Foley, Chelsea VanCleave and Blake Granger
- Home city: Ellenton, Florida

Truck information
- Year created: 2001
- No. built: 7
- Body style: 2004 Custom Bull
- Chassis: Carroll Racing Development, Patrick Enterprises Incorporated, Willman-style Chassis Design
- Engine: 540 cubic inch Merlin big block
- Transmission: Coan 2-speed
- Tires: S.I.R. racing slicks, Goodyear Terra, BKT tires

El Toro Loco (Spanish for "The Crazy Bull") is a monster truck currently racing in the Monster Jam series. The truck was created in 2001 as a variant of the 3-D molded body of the Bulldozer design, but as El Toro Loco has increased in popularity, it has become the primary truck for the body style. The truck is commonly known for "snorting" smoke out of its nose, which is toggled by a button inside the truck.

== History ==
The truck was created by SFX and PACE Motorsports, the then-parents of Monster Jam, in 2001, as a spin-off of the Bulldozer design for driver Lupe Soza, who had previously owned and driven Warrior from the 1980s. The truck became instantly popular with kids, and has since become a leading merchandise seller.

In 2003, the truck made its first Monster Jam World Finals appearance with Soza. Although its racing results were disappointing, Soza's freestyle run was lauded as exceptional and he finished second overall.

In 2004, Soza driving El Toro Loco was a Monster Jam World Finals freestyle co-champion with Madusa driven by Debrah Miceli, and Maximum Destruction driven by Tom Meents, all tied with a score of 31.

By 2013, with the truck being one of the top merchandise sellers on the series, multiple El Toro Loco trucks have been run simultaneously on separate tours, with a variety of drivers, including notably Marc McDonald, who succeeded Soza as the lead driver, and Chuck Werner. Variations of the design in black and yellow have been used to distinguish the different trucks when necessary.

== Drivers ==
=== Current Drivers ===
- Armando Castro (since 2017)
- Fernando Martinez (2023–present)
- MJ Solorio (2023–present)
- Jamey Garner (2023–present)
- Chelsea VanCleave (2023–present)
- Joe Foley (2024–present)
- Blake Granger (2024–present)
- Ryan Vargas (2025)

=== Former drivers ===
- Lupe Soza (2001–09, 2014–15)
- Nathan Weenk (2008)
- Paul Cohen (2008)
- Chris Baker (2009–11)
- Marc McDonald (2010–20)
- Chuck Werner (2010–18)
- Ryan Huffaker (2012)
- Aaron Basl (2012–13)
- Bari Musawwir (2011)
- Joey Parnell (2011)
- Dan Radoni (2013)
- Dan Evans (on one occasion)
- Tristan England (on one occasion)
- Morgan Kane (on one occasion)
- Macey Nitcher (on one occasion)
- Collete Davis (2017)
- Kayla Blood (2016–19)
- "Diesel Dave" Kiley (2018)
- Scott Buetow (2019–2020)
- Becky McDonough (2012–2021)
- Mark List (2015–2023)
- Elvis Lainez (2019–2020, 2022–2023)

== Monster Jam World Finals Championships and Accomplishments ==
- Monster Jam World Finals 4 (March 22, 2003):

Racing: lost in Round 1 to Blacksmith driven by Carl Van Horn Freestyle: 36 - 2nd Place

- Monster Jam World Finals 5 (March 20, 2004):

Racing: lost in Round 1 to King Krunch driven by David Smith (after crashing in the turn) Freestyle: tied for co-freestyle championship with 31 - 1st Place

- Monster Jam World Finals 6 (March 19, 2005):

Racing: lost in Quarter-Finals to Madusa driven by Madusa Freestyle: 8 - 19th Place

- Monster Jam World Finals 7 (March 25, 2006):

Racing: lost in Round 2 to Pastrana 199 driven by Chad Tingler Freestyle: 11 - 23rd Place

- Monster Jam World Finals 8 (March 24, 2007):

Racing: lost in Round 1 to Monster Mutt Dalmatian driven by Chad Tingler Freestyle: 11 - 16th Place

- Monster Jam World Finals 9 (March 29, 2008):

Racing: lost in Round 1 to Black Stallion driven by Michael Vaters Freestyle: 28 - 7th Place

- Monster Jam World Finals 10 (March 28, 2009):

Racing: lost in Round 2 to Blue Thunder driven by Linsey Weenk Freestyle: 20 - 14th Place

- Advance Auto Parts MONSTER JAM World Finals 11 (March 27, 2010):

Racing: lost in semi-finals to Grave Digger #20 driven by Dennis Anderson Freestyle: DNF - Broken front axle housing and 4-links

- Advance Auto Parts MONSTER JAM World Finals 12 (March 24, 2011):

Racing: lost in Round 3 to Lucas Oil CRUSADER driven by Linsey Weenk Freestyle: 27 - 7th Place

- Advance Auto Parts MONSTER JAM World Finals 13 (March 23, 2012):

Racing: lost in Round 2 to Maximum Destruction driven by Tom Meents Freestyle: 27 - 7th Place

- Advance Auto Parts MONSTER JAM World Finals 14 (March 22, 2013):

Racing: lost in Championship Race to Grave Digger the Legend driven by Adam Anderson Freestyle: 20 - 18th Place

- Monster Jam World Finals 15 (March 20, 2014):

Racing: lost in Round 2 to Monster Energy driven by Damon Bradshaw Freestyle: 32.5 - 4th Place

- Monster Jam World Finals 16 (March 18, 2015):

Racing: lost in Round 2 to Monster Energy driven by Coty Saucier Freestyle: 29 - 7th Place

- Monster Jam World Finals 17 (March 24, 2016):

Racing: lost in Round 2 to Son-uva Digger driven by Ryan Anderson Freestyle: 28.5 - 9th Place

- Monster Jam World Finals 18 (March 23, 2017, Marc McDonald):

Racing: lost in Round 2 to Monster Energy driven by Coty Saucier Freestyle: 7.163 - 16th Place

- Monster Jam World Finals 18 (March 23, 2017, Becky McDonough):

Racing: lost in Round 1 to Max-D driven by Colton Eichelberger Freestyle: 7.073 - 20th Place

- Monster Jam World Finals 19 (March 23, 2018):

Racing: lost in Round 1 to Grave Digger driven by Morgan Kane Freestyle: 6.856 - 15th Place

- Monster Jam World Finals 20 (May 10–11, 2019, Mark List, Armando Castro Scott Buetow, and Becky Mcdonough):

Showdown: (List) lost in Round 1 to Scooby-Doo! driven by Linsey Read Two-Wheel-Skills: (Castro) 8.533 - 5th place Racing: (Mcdonough): lost in Round 1 to Lucas Oil Crusader driven by Lisney Weenk High Jump: (Buetow) jumped 45.124 ft - 4th place Freestyle: (Mcdonough) 7.637 - 13th place

- Monster Jam Fall Stadium Series 2025 Champion (Castro)

Castro

== See also ==
- Monster Truck
- List of Monster Trucks
