= Monster Jam =

Live motorsport event tour and television show

- Type: Subsidiary
- Industry: Motorsports
- Founded: 1992
- Headquarters: Palmetto, Florida, United States
- Parent: Feld Entertainment
- Website: www.monsterjam.com

Monster Jam is a live motorsport event tour operated by Feld Entertainment. The series began in 1992, and is sanctioned under the umbrella of the United States Hot Rod Association. Events are primarily held in North America, with some additional events in other countries. Although individual event formats can vary greatly based on the "intermission" entertainment, the main attraction is always the racing, two-wheel skills competition, and freestyle competitions by monster trucks. Monster Jam is generally considered the largest, most famous, and most prestigious monster truck tour.

== Live events ==
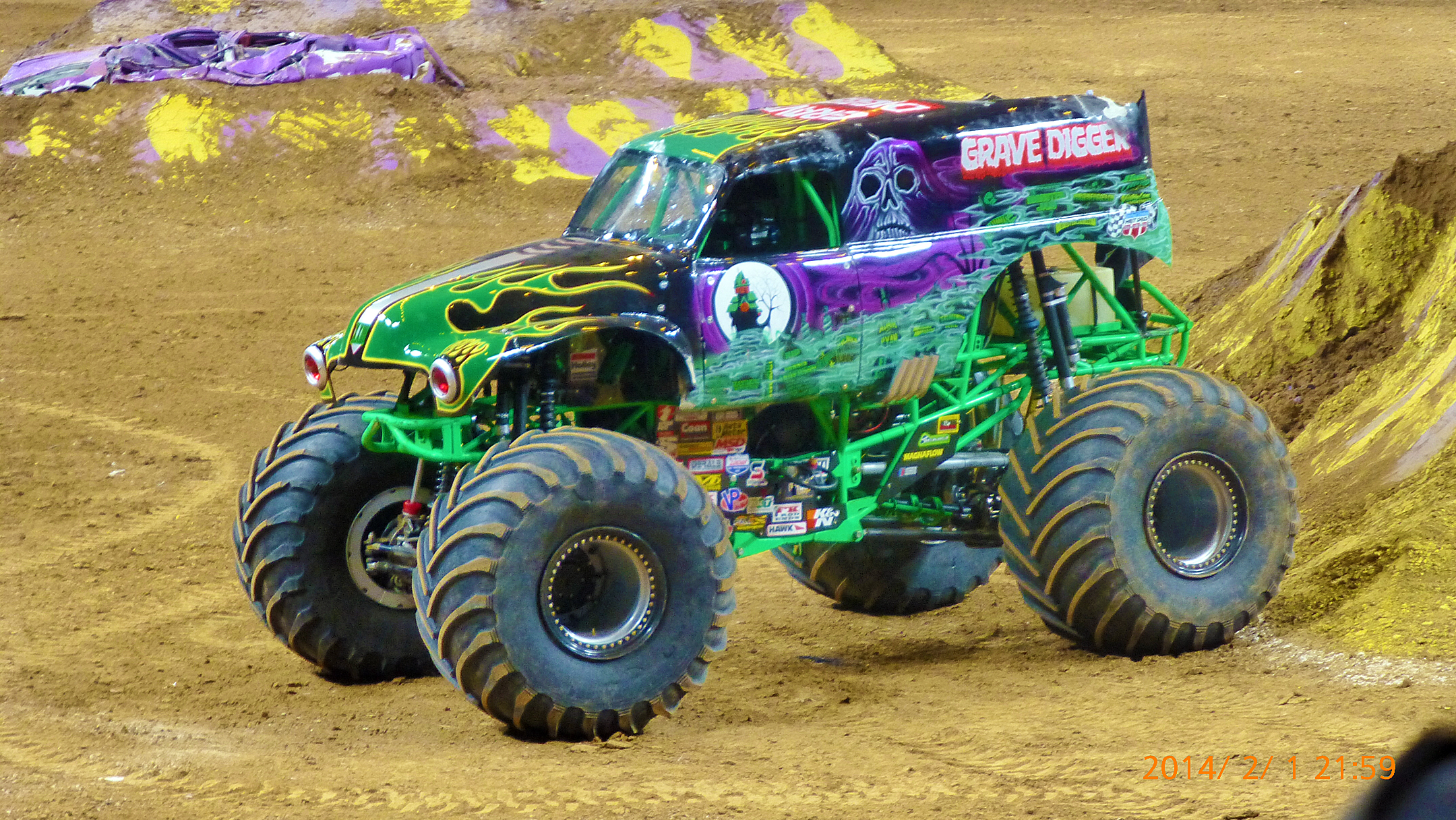
Grave Digger, one of the most popular monster trucks on the Monster Jam tours

Monster Jam events are held throughout the year in various venues around the U.S. and Canada. Stadium events are generally held in the winter and early spring when professional football and baseball stadiums are generally dormant for their main purpose, with the stadium series operating in cities with warmer winters or with domed stadiums. Events have also been held in other locations around the world, including Europe, Australia, Mexico, Costa Rica, the Philippines, Saudi Arabia, Japan, and Singapore.

At Monster Jam events, monster trucks face off in three forms of competition: racing, two-wheel skills, and freestyle.

Racing is traditional heads-up tournament racing, where the first truck to cross the finish line moves onto the next round; the final race of the night is for that particular event's championship. At very small arenas, "time trial" racing is instead used, where each truck must complete a short obstacle course in the shortest amount of time, and the truck with the fastest time wins.

The two-wheel skills competition was introduced in late 2017. This competition consists of trucks performing their best moves on two wheels for two attempts. They can also choose to perform donuts, cyclones, or sky wheelies as alternatives. Two-wheel skills scores are determined by an average score between attendees voting via a score tracking website, and an "expert judge". The truck with the highest score at the end of the event wins that particular competition.

The freestyle competition allows drivers two minutes (seventy-five seconds for arena shows) on an open floor to show off their skills as they drive the trucks over ramps and junked cars, performing stunts and tricks with their trucks. In 2020, Monster Jam introduced a rule in which a truck must complete 30 seconds to qualify for an eligible score. If they fail to do so, they will receive a score of 0. Freestyle scores are determined by an average score given between attendees voting via a score tracking website, and an "expert judge". The truck with the highest score at the end of the event wins the competition.

Each event produces its own final winner, termed as the "overall champion". This winner is determined by the truck that has the most points gained at the end of a particular event. If the same driver wins all three events in the same night, they are said to have swept the event.

Between the main competitions, other events are held. In the Arena Series, the "donut" competition is occasionally featured, in which a driver tries to spin their truck until the driver or truck is unable to continue, or until the driver thinks they have a high enough score to win. Also presented at Arena Series events are ATV racing, speedster racing, speedster obstacle course competitions, but most commonly FMX stunts featuring a small, fan-scored "best trick" competition between 4 riders.

In 2019, free-standing crush cars were officially removed from Monster Jam events. However, they are still sparsely used at the annual World Finals events, exclusive "challenge" events, and events at EchoPark Speedway.

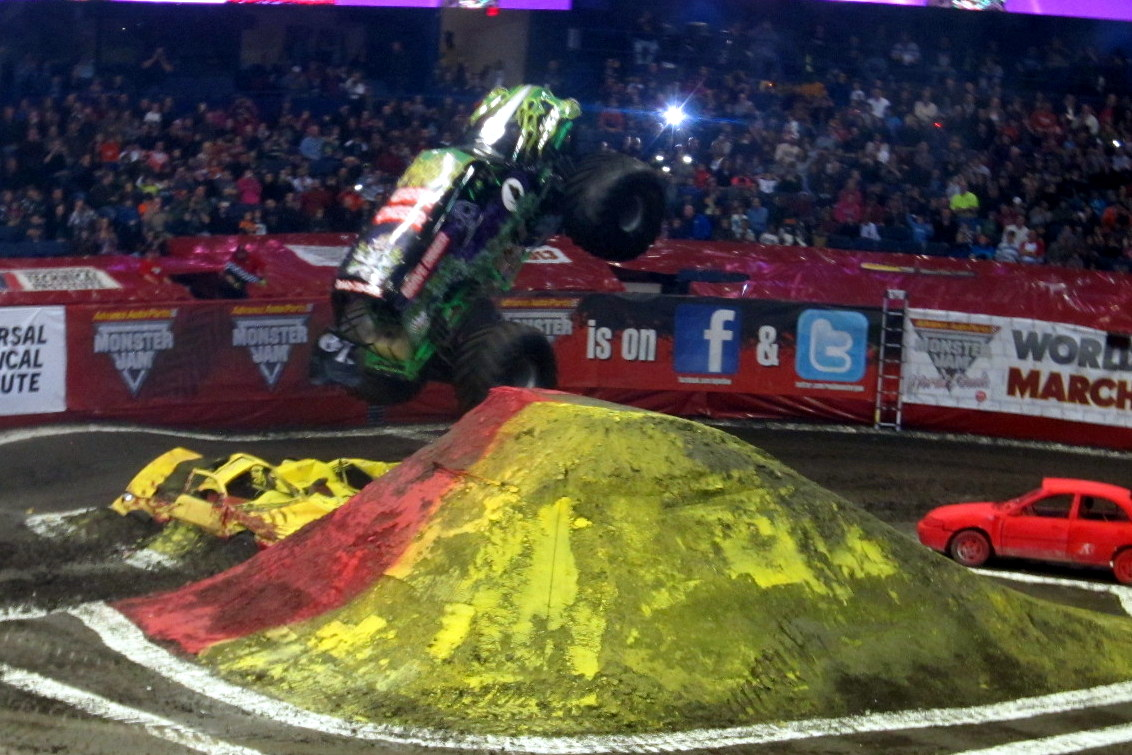
Monster Jam track used for an arena show in 2013

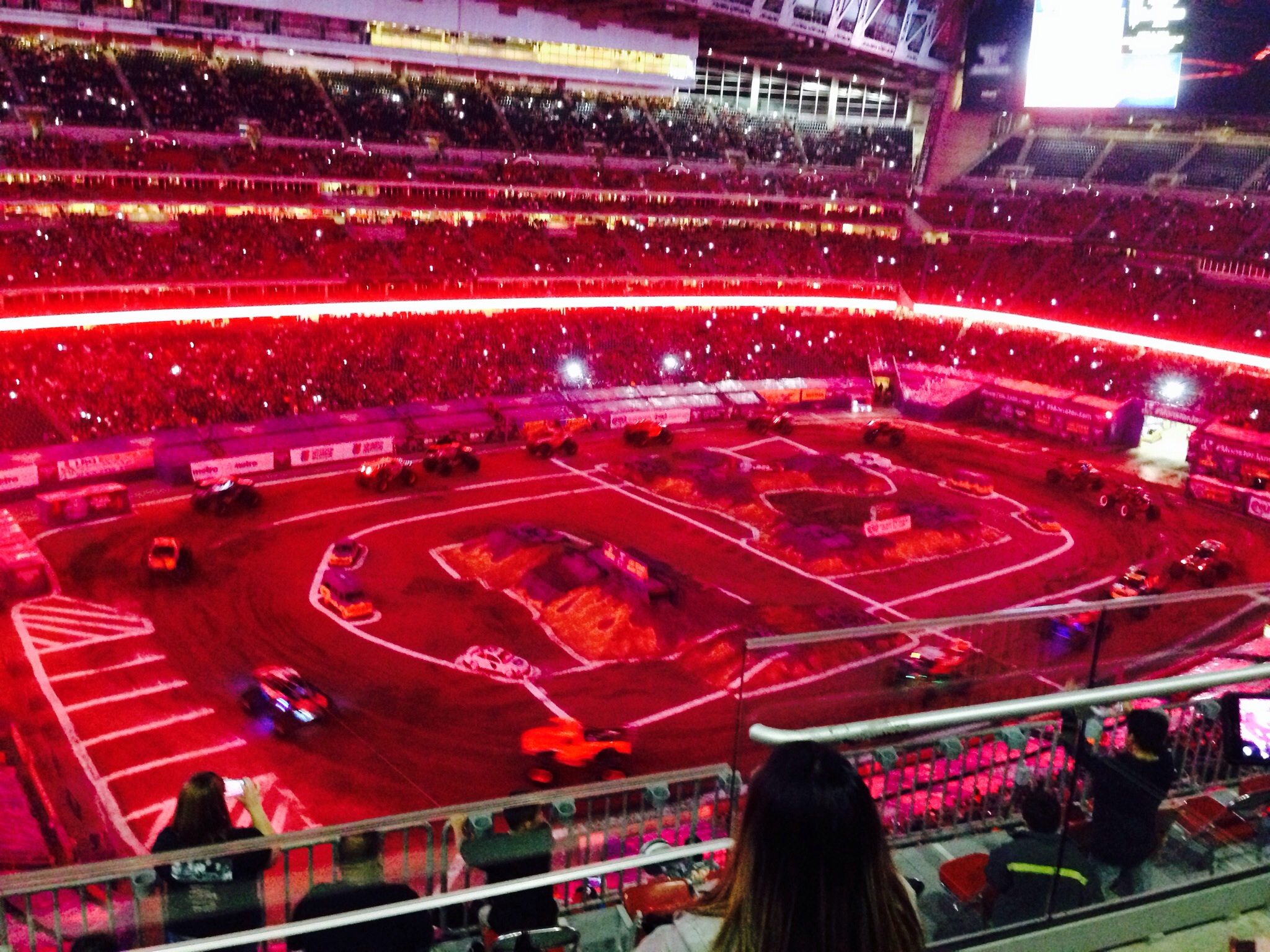
Monster Jam track used for a stadium show in 2014

== Tours ==
From 2000 to 2018, Monster Jam's competitive season began in January and ended in March, with the World Finals in Las Vegas every year, with exhibition shows continuing into the summer and fall months. Since 2019, the season still begins in January, but now ends in May with the World Finals held in Orlando, with exhibition shows continuing until the end of the year. The tours visit many major cities in the United States, Canada, Europe, South America, Central America, South Africa, and Australia.

In 2015, an arena tour debuted. This tour featured 8 drivers driving 3 different vehicles in a points series. The top two finishers received an invitation to Monster Jam World Finals 16. Also in 2015, Monster Jam started its first stadium tour. This tour followed 16 drivers each weekend on Fox Sports 1 competing for points in qualifying, racing, obstacle course racing and freestyle. The top four in the series received invitations to the Monster Jam World Finals 16. In 2016, the arena series was split into two series, east and west, with the winner of each tour getting an invitation to Monster Jam World Finals 17. Since then the number of regional tours has increased, both for stadium and arena tours.

In 2021, only one Monster Jam tour was offered, the Stadium Tour, consisting of seven rounds over five venues, similar to the 2021 AMA Supercross Championship, which also is promoted by Feld Entertainment. Twelve trucks participated in the entire tour.

In 2022, the Monster Jam calendar featured three arena tours with 8 drivers each; each tour's winner receives a spot at Monster Jam World Finals XXI in Orlando. The schedule also includes two stadium tours, each with 14 drivers competing for one spot in Monster Jam World Finals XXI.

In 2023, the Monster Jam tour featured 110 events with each champion receiving an automatic bid to the Monster Jam World Finals XXII event. The Monster Jam World Finals XXII was held in Nashville, Tennessee. The Target Freestyle champions were Colt Stephens and ThunderROARus. The BKT Racing champions were Tristan England and Earth Shaker, the Great Clips Two-Wheel Skills champion was Tyler Menninga.

In 2024, the Monster Jam tour featured 98 events divided into the Stadium Championship Series West and the Stadium Championship Series East, as well as the Arena Champion Series East, Arena Champion Series Central, and Arena Champion Series West. The Monster Jam World Finals XXIII were held in Greater Los Angeles, California.

Following the World Finals, additional exhibition tours are held through much of the rest of the year. These traditionally included stadium tours in northern cities where it is too cold during the main season to hold outdoor events, which were known as the "Path of Destruction" tour. With the expansion of the competitive season to May, these events now comprise the late-season stops of the regular stadium tours.

== World Finals ==
The Monster Jam World Finals are the culmination of the Monster Jam winter season, featuring top, hand-picked drivers from the year. It is often referred to as the "Super Bowl of monster trucks" and features drivers competing for the racing and freestyle championships. But as of 2019, a Two-Wheel Skills and High Jump championship are also included.

For the first 19 World Finals from 2000 to 2018, the event was held annually at Sam Boyd Stadium in Whitney, Nevada. On February 15, 2018, a new format was announced where the World Finals would rotate venues annually, beginning with World Finals XX. The original location for World Finals XX was set to be MetLife Stadium in East Rutherford, New Jersey, but it was later changed to Camping World Stadium in Orlando, Florida, due to scheduling issues.

World Finals XXI was scheduled for May 2–3, 2020, at Camping World Stadium, but was postponed to May 20–21, 2022 over public health concerns regarding the COVID-19 pandemic. World Finals XXII occurred July 1, 2023 at Nissan Stadium in Nashville, Tennessee, while World Finals XXIII was held on May 18, 2024 at SoFi Stadium in Inglewood, California. World Finals XXIV was held July 4–5, 2025, at Rice–Eccles Stadium in Salt Lake City, Utah, and World Finals XXV was held July 2–4, 2026, occurring at the same venue.

== Hall of Fame ==
On January 8, 2020, Monster Jam announced that they would be establishing a Hall of Fame, dedicated to honor those who, "have made immeasurable contributions to the sport". Dennis Anderson, creator and former driver of Grave Digger, and Scott Douglass, longtime announcer of Monster Jam events, were announced as the inaugural class of the new Hall of Fame at a live event at Raymond James Stadium on January 11, 2020. Originally set to be inducted at a ceremony during the weekend of World Finals XXI, the induction was held on February 27, 2021 during halftime of a show at Camping World Stadium.

On February 28, 2021, it was announced that Gary Porter, creator of Carolina Crusher and former driver of Grave Digger, and Mike Wales, former Senior Director of Fleet Operations, would be inducted as part of the Hall of Fame 2021 Class. Porter and Wales were inducted during a show at NRG Stadium on October 23, 2021.

On February 1, 2026, it was announced that Tom Meents, former Maximum Destruction driver and 14-time world champion, will be inducted into the Hall of Fame at World Finals XXV in July 2026. The following weekend, it was announced that Lupe Soza, original El Toro Loco driver and one-time world finals winner, will be inducted as part of the Hall of Fame 2026 Class as well.

== Licensing ==
Mattel's Hot Wheels brand produced officially licensed toy versions of monster trucks under the Monster Jam name. They also sponsored a monster truck that competed in the series in previous years. Monster Jam and Mattel's contract ended in 2018. Monster Jam toys have been produced by Spin Master since January 2019.

Nine officially licensed Monster Jam video games have been produced. The first two, Monster Jam: Maximum Destruction, a vehicular combat game, and Monster 4x4: Masters of Metal, an arcade racing game, were published by Ubisoft. The third, titled simply Monster Jam, was released by Activision on November 13, 2007, and a sequel to it titled Monster Jam: Urban Assault was released on October 28, 2008. A fifth game, Monster Jam: Path of Destruction, was released on November 9, 2010. On June 17, 2015, Monster Jam Battlegrounds was released as a download on Xbox Live and Steam. Monster Jam: Crush It! was released on Xbox One and PlayStation 4 on October 25, 2016, and was later released on Nintendo Switch on October 31, 2017. On June 25, 2019, Monster Jam Steel Titans was released on the PlayStation 4, PC, Xbox One, and Nintendo Switch. A sequel, Monster Jam Steel Titans 2, was released on March 2, 2021, for the same platforms as the first game.The games ware developed by Rainbow Studios and published by THQ Nordic.

Traxxas released a series of radio controlled former and current Monster Jam monster trucks, including Bigfoot, Grave Digger, and Monster Mutt.

== Media coverage ==
In the United States, Monster Jam originally aired on the now defunct TNN and Speed, with season preview and World Finals recap packages occasionally airing on CBS as part of the CBS Sports Spectacular from 2007 to 2012. From 2014 to 2018, FS1 and FS2 aired events from the series. Beginning in 2019, NBC Sports started airing the show on NBCSN. On February 15, 2023, it was announced that Monster Jam would be moving to MAVTV with a multi-year deal.

Recaps from each event are posted on Monster Jam's official YouTube channel the following week. In 2020, during the COVID-19 pandemic, Monster Jam began posting hour-long recaps of previous events recorded in 2019 and 2020, such as the 2019 All-Star Challenge. In 2020, Monster Jam introduced a subscription membership program for YouTube featuring videos of past events. A Monster Jam FAST channel was launched in 2024, and is available on Pluto TV, Vizio's WatchFree+, and Plex. The FAST channel was later launched on The Roku Channel on March 20, 2025, and on Prime Video on May 8, 2025.

Since April 2024, events have been live-streamed on the Monster Jam YouTube channel, which included the first live-streamed World Finals event in May 2024.

== Film ==
In August 2024 at the D23 expo event, a fictionalized film version of the motorsport was announced to go into production by Walt Disney Pictures. It will star Dwayne Johnson and be produced by his company, Seven Bucks Productions.
