= Stephen W. Meader =

American novelist (1892–1977)

Stephen W. Meader (May 2, 1892 – July 18, 1977) was the writer of over forty novels for young readers. His optimistic stories generally tended to either concern young men developing independent businesses in the face of adversity, or else young men caught up in adventures during different periods in American history.

Meader graduated from Haverford College in Philadelphia in 1913, and initially worked in Newark, New Jersey as a cruelty officer with the Essex County Children's Aid Society for the Prevention of Cruelty to Children, and by 1915 was working for the Big Brother Movement. After working for a Chicago publishing house in 1916, he took a position with the Circulation Department of the Curtis Publishing Company in Philadelphia, eventually reaching the position of Editor of the Sales Division publications. His first novel, The Black Buccaneer, was the first juvenile publication of the newly founded Harcourt, Brace and Howe. Today all (or nearly all) of his novels are available in reprint from Southern Skies.

He moved his family to Moorestown Township, New Jersey in 1922.

A biography of Meader is also available from the Southern Skies website.

== Bibliography ==
- The Black Buccaneer (1920) - Pirates along the Atlantic coast in the 18th century. (Available as an audiobook at Librivox.org)
- Down the Big River (1924) - The voyage of a frontier family down the Ohio River in pioneer days. (Available as an audiobook at Librivox.org)
- Longshanks (1928) - a story of the Mississippi River and how the young hero became acquainted with Abraham Lincoln.
- Red Horse Hill (1930) - Farm life in New Hampshire and a thrilling country horse race.
- Away to Sea (1931) - Jim Slater runs away to sea, discovering too late that he had signed up on a slave ship bound for Africa.
- King of the Hills (1933) - The story of Old Scarback, a famous stag, and a boy who helped arrest a gang of deer jackers.
- Lumberjack (1934) - Dan earns the money for college by becoming a lumberjack in the New Hampshire woods.
- The Will to Win and Other Stories (1936) - a collection of sports stories.
- Trap Lines North (1936)
- Who Rides in the Dark? (1937) - Dan Drew, stableboy in a New Hampshire country inn in 1827, helps in the arrest of a band of highwaymen.
- T-Model Tommy (1938) - How Tom Ballard built up his own trucking business.
- Boy with a Pack (1939) - Adventures of a boy who went to Ohio country in 1837. (Newbery Honor)
- Bat, the Story of a Bull Terrier (1939)
- Clear for Action! (1940) - A Maine boy's adventures as an impressed seaman aboard a British ship in the War of 1812.
- Blueberry Mountain (1941) - Two boys start a blueberry farm in the Pocono mountains and develop it into a thriving business.
- Shadow in the Pines (1942) - A fifteen-year-old New Jersey boy helps to capture a Nazi spy ring that threatens Fort Dix.
- The Sea Snake (1943) – A teenager from the Outer Banks of North Carolina finds himself captured and a prisoner in a German submarine.
- The Long Trains Roll (1944) - a young railroad worker helps the FBI deal with saboteurs.
- Skippy's Family (1945) - The true story of Skippy, a mongrel dog who for 17 years was a member of the Meader family.
- Jonathan Goes West (1946) - The pageantry of America's westward movement is caught in this exciting story of an adventurous journey from Maine to Illinois in 1845.
- Behind the Ranges (1947) - Dick Randolph discovers a strange sort of human being in the unexplored loveliness of the Olympic Mountains of our Northwest.
- River of the Wolves (1948) - As an Indian captive during the French and Indian War, young Dave Foster learns to face the dangers and hardships of life in the Canadian wilderness.
- Cedar's Boy (1949) - a vivid, swift-moving story of the harness races at the Riverdale Fair. Authentic Americana, this has some of the same characters as Red Horse Hill.
- Whaler 'Round the Horn (1950) - Rodney Glenn ships out of New Bedford on a memorable whaling voyage that leads him to the magic islands of Hawaii.
- Bulldozer (1951) - The fascination of modern machinery is combined with much action in this story of a Maine boy who starts a contracting business with a reconditioned bulldozer.
- The Fish Hawk's Nest (1952) - Cape May New Jersey is the setting of this dramatic tale of smuggling in the 1880s.
- Sparkplug of the Hornets (1953) - an exciting story of a small high school's basketball team and its uphill fight fr the state championship.
- The Buckboard Stranger (1954) - a smooth-talking Texas stranger rolls into a small New England mill town of the early 1900s and causes a summer of excitement for Chuck and Barney. A masterful tale of suspense.
- Guns for the Saratoga (1955) - Gideon Jones adventures in the newly created US Navy give an exciting picture of life on the sloop-of-war Saratoga during the Revolutionary War.
- Sabre Pilot (1956) - The action-packed story of Kirk Owen who enlists in the US Air Force and becomes a jet fighter pilot in the Korean War.
- Everglades Adventure (1957) - an absorbing story of the Florida Everglades in the 1870s, in which Toby Morgan's chance to act as a guide for a naturalist gives new meaning to his explorations.
- The Commodore's Cup (1958) - an action-filled story in which young Luke Cramer crews in small-boat sailing races off the New Jersey coast and, by luck and hard work, gets a Comet Class boat of his own.
- Wild Pony Island (1959) - a city boy is transplanted to North Carolina's Okracoke island, noted for its wild ponies, and finds a new and challenging way of life.
- Buffalo And Beaver (1960) - a year spent trapping in the Rocky Mountain wilderness, before the white settlers came, gave Jeff Barlow a sense of our country's natural beauty and of history in the making.
- Snow on Blueberry Mountain (1961)
- Phantom of the Blockade (1962)
- The Muddy Road to Glory (1963)
- Stranger on Big Hickory (1964)
- A Blow for Liberty (1965)
- Topsail Island Treasure (1966) - Combining an interest in bird watching with his doctor's orders to exercise his once-paralyzed leg, Don Douglas finds himself involved in the mystery surrounding a hunt for buried treasure along the New Jersey coast.
- Keep 'Em Rolling (1967)
- Lonesome End (1968) - A shy young cowboy finds a place for himself on the high school football team in his western Kansas town.
- The Cape May Packet (1969)

== In popular culture ==
In his novel It, Stephen King mentions Bulldozer. It's the book that Ben Hanscom had borrowed while he was young and found when he went back to Derry.
