= Ashen (2004 video game) =

- North American box art
- Developer: Torus Games
- Publisher: Nokia
- Platform: N-Gage
- Release: NA: May 25, 2004; EU: June 17, 2004
- Genre: First-person shooter
- Modes: Single-player, multiplayer

Ashen is a 2004 first-person shooter video game developed by Torus Games and published by Nokia for the N-Gage. It was first shown to the public at Cebit 2004.

== Gameplay ==
The game is divided into eight levels that take place in various environments and areas from the city, in which the player must complete objectives in various sections in order to proceed. There are nine different weapons available in the game, including two pistols, alien weapons, a machine gun, a sniper rifle, and a rocket launcher.

There is also the ability to enter a score in the game into the N-Gage Arena; however, a direct Multiplayer over GPRS is not present. The game offers an offline multiplayer mode for up to four players and with four different levels to play on.

== Plot ==
In Seven River City, mysterious phenomena begin to happen. Jacob Ward, along with all of the residents, flee the city. Jacob's sister did not make it out, however, and he decides to return to save her.

== Reception ==
Reception

Aggregate score
Aggregator	Score
Metacritic	61/100

Review scores
Publication	Score
Game Informer	6.25/10
GamePro	3/5
GameSpot	6.2/10
GameSpy	2/5
GameZone	8/10
IGN	7.5/10
X-Play	2/5
The Times	3/5

The game received "mixed" reviews according to the review aggregation website Metacritic.
