= Scooby-Doo! First Frights =

2009 video game

- North American PlayStation 2 box art
- Developer: Torus Games
- Publisher: Warner Bros. Interactive Entertainment
- Platforms: Microsoft Windows, Nintendo DS, PlayStation 2, Wii
- Release: NA: September 22, 2009; EU: October 9, 2009; AU: October 9, 2009; PC: POL: November 25, 2011; RUS: December 16, 2011
- Genres: Platformer, Beat 'em up
- Modes: Single-player, multiplayer

Scooby-Doo! First Frights is a platform video game developed by Torus Games and published by Warner Bros. Interactive Entertainment. The game released alongside the DVD release of Scooby-Doo! The Mystery Begins. The game features Scott Innes as Shaggy, and the other three main voice-cast members returning from What's New Scooby Doo? This is the fourth Scooby-Doo video game to use a laugh track. A successor to the game, Scooby-Doo and the Spooky Swamp, was released in 2010.

== Gameplay ==
Scooby-Doo! First Frights is a 3D linear platformer with light puzzle elements, and the gameplay and interface are highly reminiscent of TT Games' Lego game series. Players can choose to control either Scooby-Doo, Shaggy, Velma, Daphne or Fred. Scooby has a sausage string to hit with, blocking capability, and the ability to crawl into vents. Shaggy shoots with a slingshot, has blocking capability, and carries a yo-yo to grapple with. Velma throws books, has blocking capability, and can activate machines. Daphne has hand-to-hand combat, flying kick, and can climb up poles. Fred has hand-to-hand combat, stun bombs, and super strength to push crates and activate the handwheels. Each character has 2 costumes unique to each episode, and one obtainable with a code, with different powers and weapons.

The game's 22 levels are separated into four "episodes." Each level has a clue, and at the end of each episode the player must choose who they think the villain is, based on the evidence they have gathered. Trophies and costumes are rewarded for doing certain tasks. The game can also be played in multiplayer co-op.

== Plot ==
The game begins with the Mystery, Inc. gang at their clubhouse located in a swamp. Velma arrives with a newspaper, announcing to the gang that there will be a food festival at Keystone Castle. Scooby and Shaggy like the idea of going, but Daphne reminds them that they promised to help her cousin Anna at the St. Louis High School Talent Show. Scooby and Shaggy want to help her, but they plan to get it done quickly so they can go to the food festival.

The first "episode" takes the gang to St. Louis High school, where they are informed by Anna that a Phantom has been haunting the school with an army of skeletons and scaring everybody out. The gang investigates and soon confronts the Phantom and stops his plot to ruin the talent show, which conflicts with a sports carnival on the same day. The player is then presented with the whodunit minigame, where they can get monster mask trophies. In Episode 2, the gang heads out to a local amusement park so Scooby-Doo and Shaggy can practice their eating for the food festival, only to find out upon their arrival that the place is closed. After deciding to investigate, they also find out the place is overrun with evil toys that are attacking the park. They search a nearby toy factory while avoiding the toys there, and soon manage to defeat their leader, a toymaker controlling a giant robot. In Episode 3, the group goes to a local seaside town named Rocky Bay, which is being terrorized by a sea monster. After investigating throughout the town and on a mysterious ghostly cruise ship at sea, they encounter the "sea monster", a giant mechanical lobster, in the ship’s flooded bowels and stop its pilots' plot to steal valuable pearls from a nearby reef.

The final episode has the gang arriving at Keystone Castle, only to find the Baron paranoid about the spirit of an evil enchantress who has begun sending scary monsters to attack the castle and get him. They learn from the baron's sister, Lady Azarni, and later the baron himself that the enchantress put a spell on the family years ago that causes the castle barons to suffer terrible fates. While investigating, the gang discover a gold mine underneath the castle. They soon confront and manage to defeat the enchantress and the castle collapses. After the gang tells to the baron that Lady Azarni planned to get rid of him to keep the gold for herself, the baron reveals he doesn't have a sister and that Lady Azarni was never really there, to which Velma declares it is a mystery that will have to remain unsolved. Shaggy and Scooby then finally get to go to the food festival.

== Reception ==
Reception

Aggregate scores
Aggregator	Score
GameRankings	(Wii) 58.83% (DS) 53.67% (PS2) 53.33%
Metacritic	(Wii) 56/100 (DS) 54/100 (PS2) 53/100

Review scores
Publication	Score
GamesRadar+	51%
IGN	5/10
PALGN	4/10

First Frights was met with very mixed reception upon release. GameRankings and Metacritic gave it a score of 58.83% and 56 out of 100 for the Wii version; 53.67% and 54 out of 100 for the DS version; and 53.33% and 53 out of 100 for the PlayStation 2 version.
