= Maximum Destruction =

Monster truck

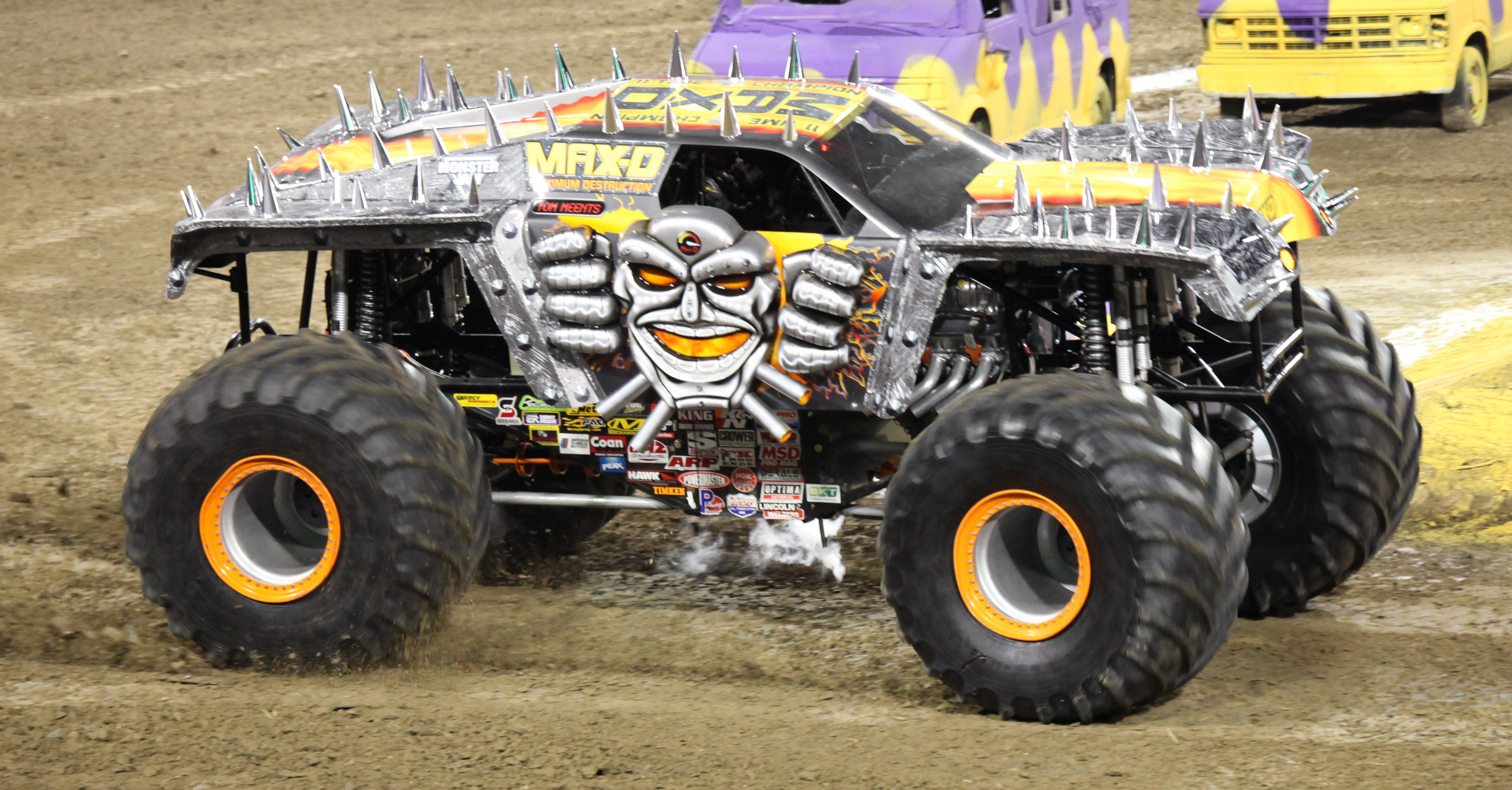
- Max-D's current body used since 2014.

Owner and driver information
- Owner: Tom Meents
- Driver(s): Tom Meents; Neil Elliott; Kreg Christensen; Chuck Werner; Morgan Kane; Colton Eichelberger; Jared Eichelberger; Blake Granger; Coty Saucier
- Home city: Paxton, Illinois

Truck information
- Year created: 2000
- Previous name(s): Goldberg (2000–2001); Team Meents (2002)
- Body style: Futuristic SUV
- Chassis: Willman-style
- Engine: 540 CID Merlin
- Transmission: Coan 2-speed
- Tires: BKT

Maximum Destruction, also known as Max-D, was a monster truck team owned and operated by Tom Meents that ran as part of the Monster Jam circuit from 2000 through 2024.

== History ==
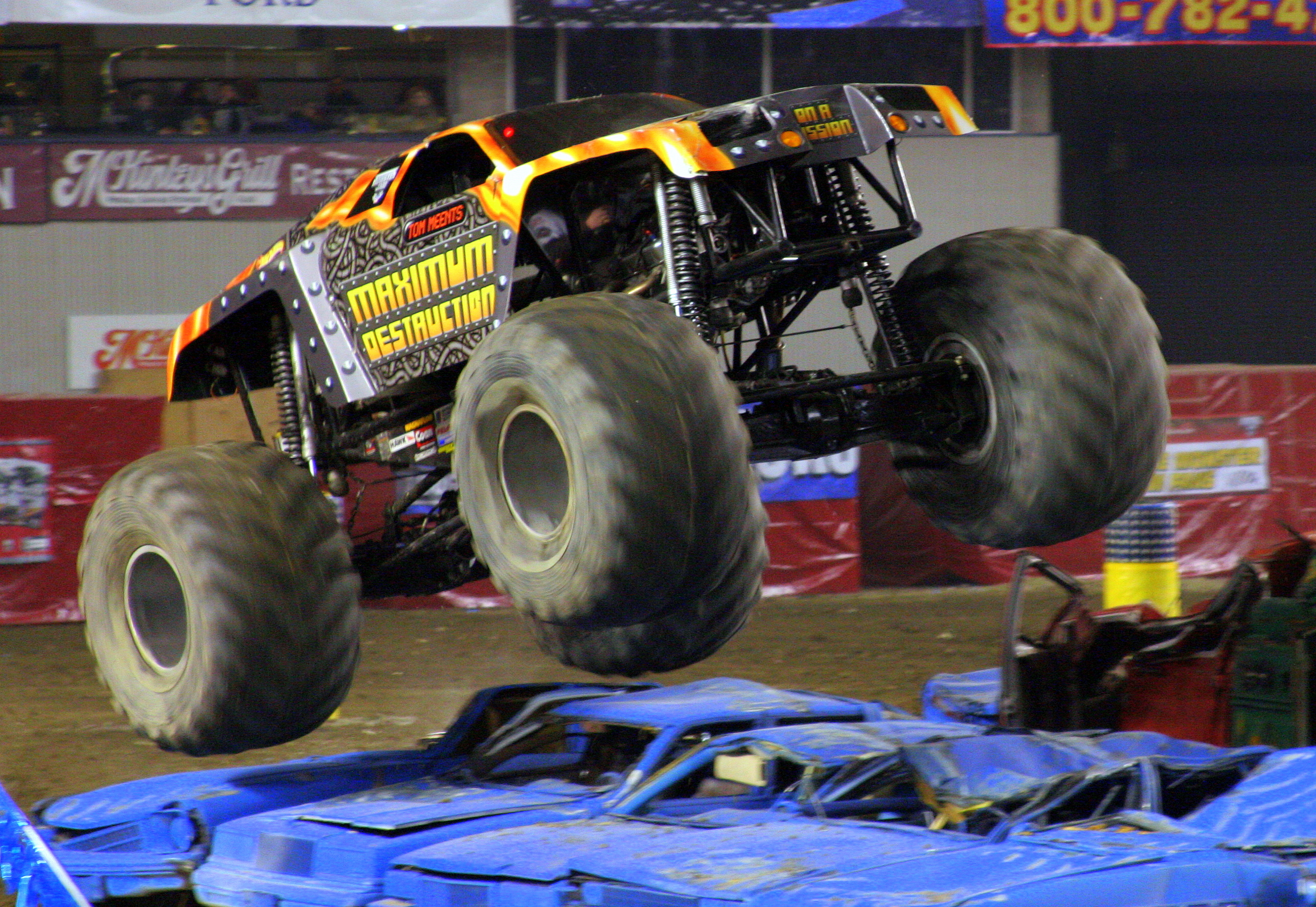
Maximum Destruction's original paint scheme used from 2003 to 2012

In 1999, then-Monster Jam parent company Clear Channel Communications signed a cross-promotional deal with World Championship Wrestling to create monster trucks based on professional wrestlers. In order to ensure the success of the truck of Bill Goldberg, one of the most popular WCW wrestlers, Clear Channel contracted the team of Tom Meents (who was already popular from driving Monster Patrol and Bulldozer) to build and campaign the "Goldberg" truck. Meents debuted in the truck in January 2000 at the Georgia Dome, where he won racing and finished third in freestyle. As the year progressed, and as Dennis Anderson struggled in Grave Digger, Meents dominated and capped the year by winning the first Monster Jam World Finals Racing Championship. The following year saw a continuation of the dominance, when Meents won the world racing and freestyle championships.

In 2001, WCW was bought out by the World Wrestling Federation and the deal with Clear Channel was dropped. For 2002, Meents kept the same truck and body but renamed the truck Team Meents, even retaining much of Goldberg's color scheme and graphics with the WCW graphic on the front of the truck being replaced with a "Three-time world champion" sticker, and the image of Goldberg's face on the back of the truck being replaced with a photo of Meents's face wearing sunglasses. Neil Elliot began driving a second truck for the team that year as well. Once again, Meents swept both the racing and freestyle at World Finals 3.

In 2003, saw the truck change both name and image to become Maximum Destruction, a name which Meents had intended to run the year before until he delayed those plans out of respect for the September 11 attacks. The team has remained significantly popular, and is now generally regarded as the chief rival of Grave Digger, the tour's most popular team.

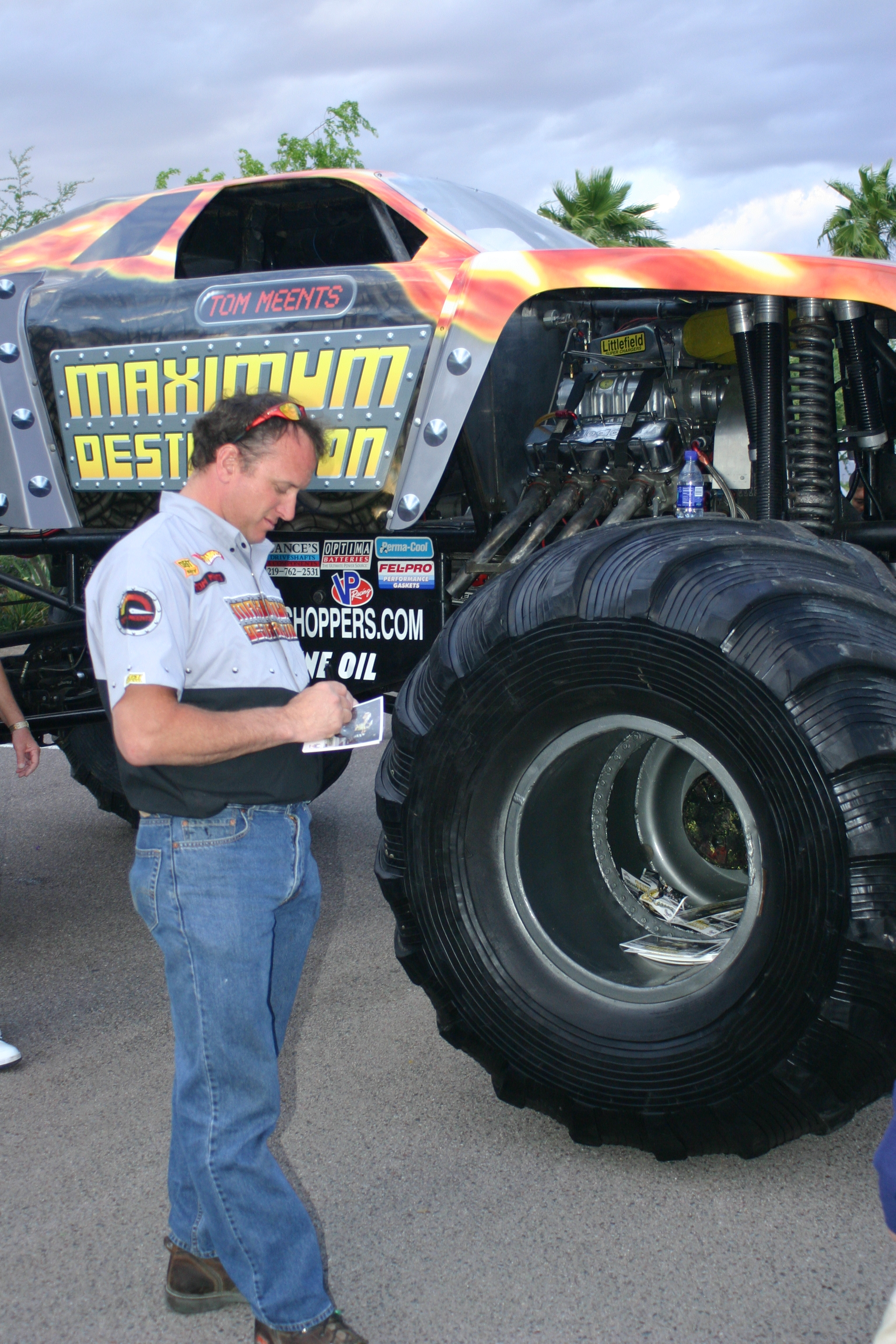
Tom Meents signing autographs in front of Maximum Destruction

In 2005 Meents jumped Maximum Destruction over his old house, before destroying the house with the truck.

In 2013, Maximum Destruction celebrated 10 years. The trucks were decorated in a new livery featuring spikes around the body and a large robotic face on the side and the truck began to be known as "Max-D". At World Finals 14, Meents won freestyle in Max-D, earning his 11th World Finals Championship.

In 2016, Meents's two stepsons, Colton and Jared Eichelberger, joined the team. At World Finals 17, both Meents and Colton competed in the main events while Jared competed in the Young Guns Shootout. During the racing encore, Meents jumped his truck over five monster trucks. In an attempt to break this record, he tried to jump over six trucks in April at Levis Stadium, though the trucks were positioned to either side of the area Meents was jumping, thus not breaking the record. This was mainly because of the conditions of the muddy track. He later reattempted this, successfully jumping over six trucks later in the same month at MetLife Stadium in East Rutherford, New Jersey.

In 2017, Meents sustained an injury and was unable to compete. Due to his injury, Meents did not compete in World Finals 18. Dennis Anderson also sustained an injury, making this the first time where Meents and Anderson both did not compete in the World Finals; Anderson would retire after that season.

In 2018, at World Finals 19, the Max-D team celebrated their 15-year anniversary of the truck with a special encore after competition ended, featuring all the Max-D truck designs throughout the past years, including the original Maximum Destruction appearance.

In late 2023, Meents announced that the 2024 season would be his last as a driver, and he would be the sole domestic Max-D driver for the season, with Blake Granger driving international dates. However, on February 4, 2024, Meents sustained a neck injury that ended his season. Colton Eichelberger returned to take over driving for a period, with Granger and Coty Saucier replacing Meents for the remainder of the year. On October 12, 2024, Max-D competed for the last time at Accor Stadium in Sydney, Australia.

== Signature elements ==
Since the truck debuted as Goldberg, the truck has become known for bouncy and wild rides, and for its ability to make large jumps and take several hits during freestyle runs and not suffer significant damage. The truck is also known for its numerous crashes, often simply as a result of Meents' full-throttle driving. Meents' driving style is emulated by the other drivers, who are said to have graduated from the "Tom Meents School of Monster Truck Driving".

Maximum Destruction is one of the few teams in the modern monster truck industry to use front-mounted engines as opposed to the more common mid-frame position.

=== Backflips ===
During the freestyle portion of a European tour event in Gothenburg, Sweden, Meents hit the backside of a 'step up' jump which caused the truck to rotate backwards, land on the roof at the top of the obstacle and then continue to roll backwards back onto the wheels where Meents continued his run. This inspired drivers to attempt a complete aerial backflip. Travis Pastrana made an attempt during a Season 1 episode of Nitro Circus using a purpose-built ramp. However, the truck did not get enough rotation and slammed down onto the roof from about 40 feet in the air; Pastrana was uninjured.

In 2009, at World Finals 10 in Las Vegas, Meents rolled on to the floor during the encore in Maximum Destruction. Nobody knew what he was going to do until he launched his truck off the backside of the center jump, which was almost a solid wall of dirt. The truck instantly bounced up into the air and managed to rotate one and half times backwards until landing on the tailgate, resulting in the truck rolling onto its roof. Although spectacular, it did not technically count because he did not land on his tires. It was later revealed in a special DVD release about Meents' build up to the backflip at the World Finals, that he had, in fact, landed a complete backflip in his backyard during testing. Therefore, Meents was the first to land a successful backflip. In 2010, Cam McQueen, driving Pastrana's Nitro Circus truck, completed a backflip in Jacksonville, Florida. This was the first backflip landed in competition.

Since then, there have been many successful and unsuccessful attempts from several drivers. A few drivers have even completed corkscrew type flips where the truck backflips and lands facing the opposite direction.

After George Balhan, driver of Mohawk Warrior, landed two consecutive backflips at the 2012 Monster Jam World Finals, Meents was driven to land the double. After months of preparation at his shop in Paxton, Illinois, on June 16, 2012, at the last show of the Monster Jam Path of Destruction Tour at Metlife Stadium in East Rutherford, New Jersey, Meents came out in a modified Maximum Destruction stunt truck, built specifically for the double backflip. When Meents hit the jump, his truck completed one rotation, but started to twist in the second rotation then landing on the roof, coming up just short. Then, on Saturday, March 23, 2013, he attempted it again in the encore portion of Monster Jam World Finals 14. The truck landed on the sides of the left side tires, and bounced back on all four wheels. This would not count as a double backflip as he did not complete both rotations. Meents would try again in 2015 at Foxborough's Gillette stadium with an all chrome Max-D body. He would land on the right front tire and bounce back. Again, he would not complete 2 rotations. A double backflip has yet to be landed.

== Trucks ==
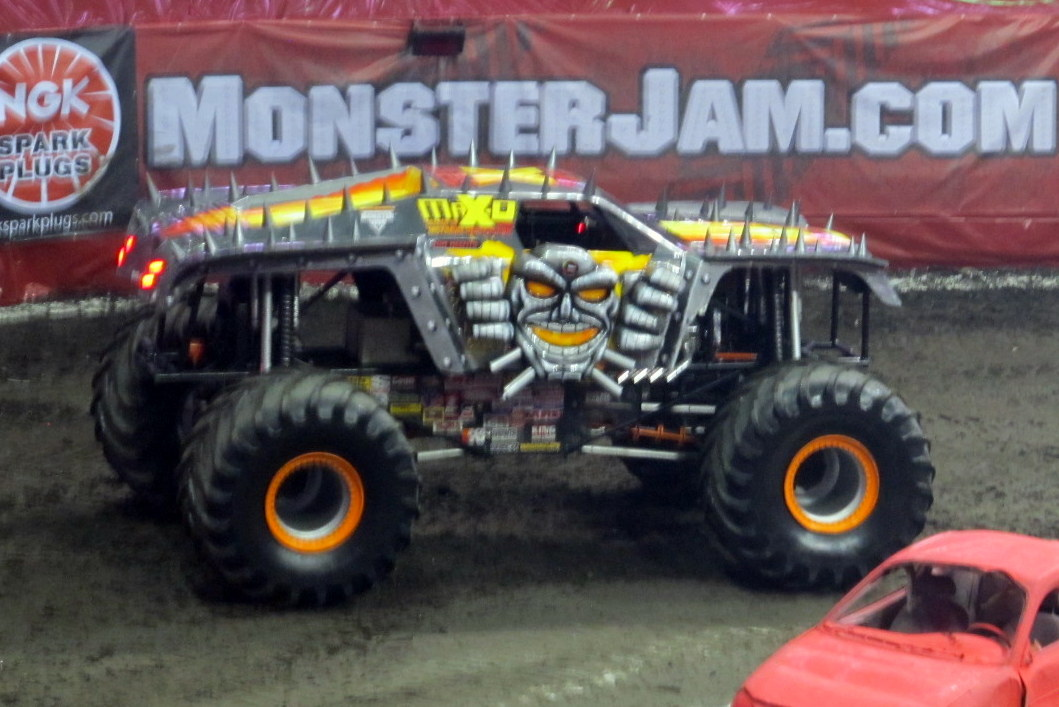
10th Anniversary Max-D: Decade of Destruction body, which ran exclusively in 2013

Since the debut of the Maximum Destruction name in 2003, there have been 9 trucks fielded by the team:

- 1 – Debuted in 2000 as Goldberg, became Team Meents in 2002, became Maximum Destruction in 2003, retired in 2010
- 2 – Debuted in 2003, retired in 2011
- 3 – Debuted in 2011, retired in 2016
- 4 – Debuted in 2011, retired in 2017
- 5 – Debuted in 2012, retired in 2020
- 6 – Debuted in 2012, retired in 2017
- 7 – Debuted in 2017,
- 8 – Debuted in 2017, retired in 2021
- 9 – Debuted in 2018, retired in 2024

Additionally, a truck with a modified design used only for special stunts debuted in 2012. Also, the Maximum Destruction body design has been used on chassis owned by Monster Jam parent Feld Entertainment for international tours; these do not feature the front-mounted engine usually used by the team.

== Drivers ==
- Tom Meents (2000–2024)
- Neil Elliott (2003–2020)
- Kreg Christensen (2009, 2011–2013)
- Phil Foster (2004-2005)
- Chuck Werner (2013–2018)
- Morgan Kane (2014–2016)
- Colton Eichelberger (2016–2021, 2024-2025)
- Jared Eichelberger (2016–2019)
- Blake Granger (2017–2024)
- Coty Saucier (2024)

== Monster Jam World Finals championships ==
- Racing championships: 2000, 2001, 2002, 2009, 2011, 2012
- Freestyle championships: 2001, 2002, 2004, 2006, 2013, 2022
- 2-wheel skills championships: 2019, 2022
- ATV racing championships: 2019

NOTE: All racing, freestyle, and 2-wheel skills championships have been won by Meents. Blake Granger won the 2019 ATV racing championship.

== See also ==
- List of monster trucks
