= Bulldozer (monster truck) =

Monster truck designed by Guy Wood

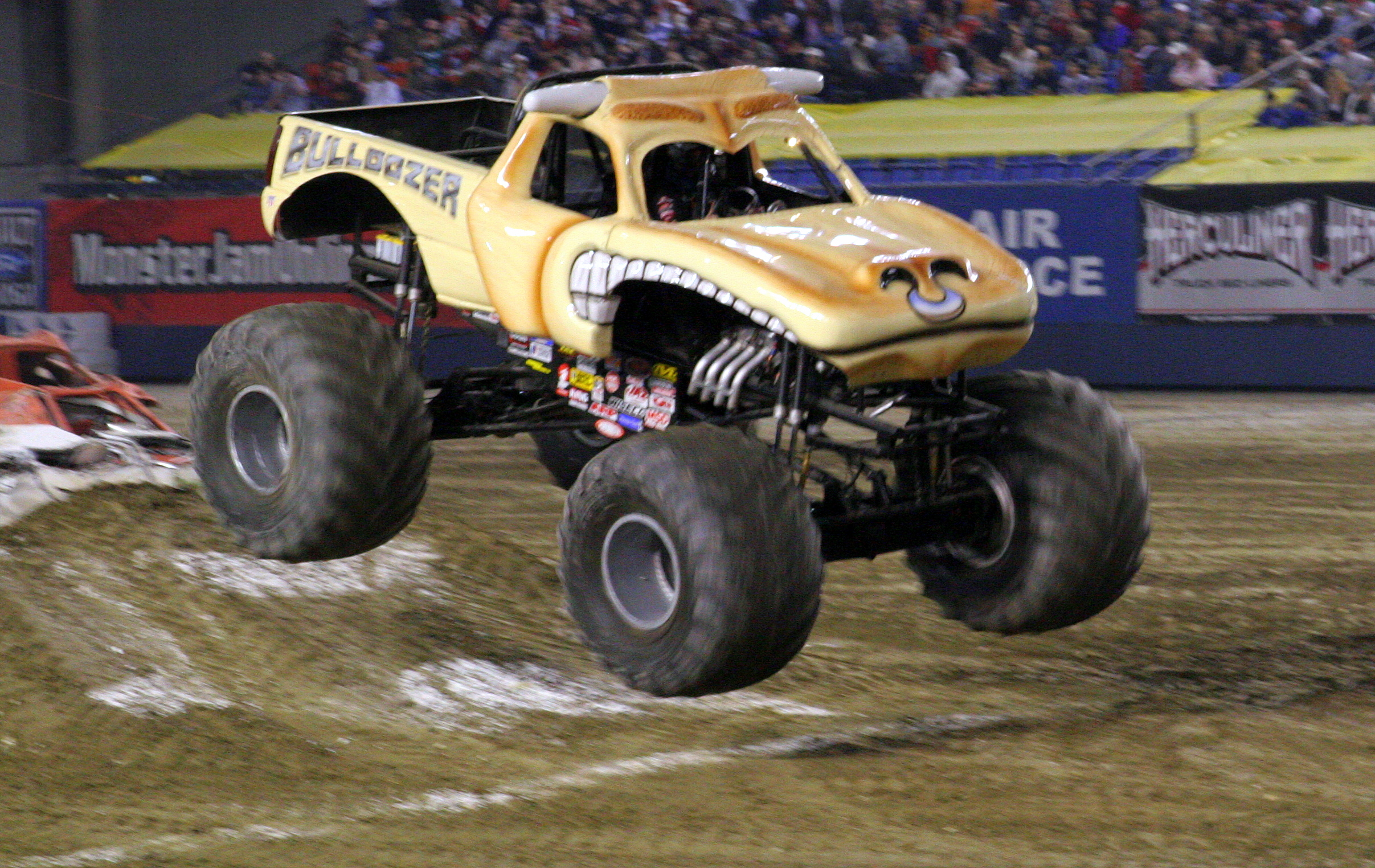

Owner and driver information
- Owner: FELD Motorsports
- Driver(s): Chuck Werner, Alex Blackwell, Guy Wood, Mark Hall, Kirk Dabney, Eldon DePew, Rob Knell, Steve Reynolds, & Bobby Z.
- Home city: Blackwell, Missouri

Truck information
- Year created: 1997
- Body style: 2004 Custom Bull
- Chassis: Willman-style frame
- Engine: 540 cubic inch Merlin big block
- Transmission: Coan 2-speed
- Tires: S.I.R. racing slicks

Bulldozer was a monster truck designed by Guy Wood. It featured one of the first 3-D body shells, with horns sticking out of the roof. The truck debuted in 1997 as a promotional truck for Smoke Craft jerky in the USA Motorsports series (since acquired by Monster Jam, who now own the rights to the design). Hall Brothers Racing also campaigned a Bulldozer truck during the USA Motorsports era, due to their sponsorship from Smoke Craft as well. The truck has been driven by Bobby Zoelner, Steve Reynolds, Rob Knell, former Taurus driver Eldon DePew, and current Maximum Destruction superstar Tom Meents, as well as Chuck Werner and Alex Blackwell. The truck El Toro Loco was created as a spin-off of the Bulldozer design.

== World Finals Appearances ==
Bulldozer has appeared in four Monster Jam World Finals. In 2001, the truck was driven by Eldon DePew. In 2000, 2002, and 2004, the truck was driven by Guy Wood.

== Final appearance ==
The truck performed its last show in Englishtown, New Jersey, at Old Bridge Township Raceway Park on September 19, 2009. After that show, the truck was converted into an El Toro Loco, with the same driver as before, Chuck Werner.

== See also ==
- List of monster trucks
