= Monster truck accident =

Monster truck accident may refer to:

- Chihuahua monster truck accident
- Haaksbergen monster truck accident
- 2026 Popayán monster truck accident
