= Dave 'Heavy D' Sparks =

American media personality (born 1985)

David William Sparks
- Born: David William Sparks; January 5, 1985 (age 41); Utah, U.S.
- Other name: HeavyDSparks
- Education: Weber State University (withdrew)
- Occupations: Custom vehicle builder; television personality; internet personality; entrepreneur
- Years active: 2008–present
- Organization(s): DieselSellerz LLC. (CEO), Sparks Motors (CEO)
- Television: Diesel Brothers; Monster Jam
- Parent: David Sparks (1965 - 2023)

YouTube information
- Channel: HeavyDSparks
- Subscribers: 4.59 million
- Views: 1.16 billion
- Last updated: April 11, 2026

David Sparks also known as HeavyDSparks on YouTube, (born January 5, 1985), is an American actor. He is most known for his role on the reality TV show Diesel Brothers, which aired on Discovery Channel. He is also known for his participation in Monster Jam and former owner of conserved Fremont Island located in the Great Salt Lake.

== Early life and education ==
Dave Sparks was born in Utah, US to a military family. He is from Salt Lake City and is the fourth child of his family. His father died when Dave was 21 years old. He is of German heritage. He showed an interest in vehicles from a young age, with Auto mechanics being one of his favorite subjects in high school. He began his tertiary education at Weber State University at age 21, where he studied welding, mechanics, and fabrication, he withdrew from school after having spent a semester, to kick off his own business.

== Career ==
He started his career splitting time between 2 different occupations; director of marketing for Rockwell Watches, a Utah based watch company started by one of his longtime friends Rich Eggett and operating heavy machinery for his uncle and mentor's construction firm before launching his own excavation business. He began as a car enthusiast, kicking off his vehicle customization and fix-it shop for all types of vehicles. This marked the beginning of his career and the careers of his three other friends who took part in Diesel Brothers show. He brought on his friend David "Diesel Dave" Kiley and two others, to assist with equipment operations at his company. After posting several videos on YouTube, an appearance on The Tonight Show With Jay Leno was fixed and after the show, he was contacted by Discovery Channel for the commencement of the Diesel Brothers. The show is filmed mostly in Woods Cross, Utah, where his shop is located. Some episodes have also been filmed in Salt Lake City and Wendover, Utah. As an internet personality, his Youtube channel has over 4.1 million subscribers and over 900 million views. He has over 10 million followers and over 2 billion views across all social media platforms. During the course of filming Diesel Brothers, he has also worked with actor, Chuck Norris, amongst others. His first build was a 1976 Yamaha YZ80. One of his most well known creations was the Mega Ram Runner, which he designed and created based on a Dodge Ram 3500 and had a Ford 4R100 transmission. The Mega Ram Runner was displayed at the 2014 SEMA Show. Kanye West sold Sparks his customized Ripsaw EV2, following West's relocation from Wyoming. He acquired the Fremont Island as a potential location for his show filming, customization and vehicular activities, however, he resold the island in 2020 after being unable to secure permits to carry out these activities. Also on his show, he converted a Tesla Cybertruck to have snow tracks, amongst others. He has a world record monster truck jump in his personally branded monster truck, The BroDozer. Some of his other stunts are using a flamethrower to thaw a helicopter, driving multiple different vehicles long distances while tipped up on only 2 wheels, and an attempt at jumping a truck from plane; which was canceled due to safety concerns. He is known for his search and rescue resource, and for being able to solve challenging rescue situations with his expert team and specialized equipment.

He is the co-founder and CEO of two automobile companies, DieselSellerz and Sparks Motors. DieselSellerz has its diesel truck classifieds community website, DieselSellerz.com. His third company called Diesel Power, is a lifestyle brand. He became a brand ambassador and partner with brands including Polaris Inc., Sany Equipment, Ariat Boots, BFGoodrich tires, New Holland Construction & Agriculture, and was involved in a collaboration with MLB Network for the Father's Day of 2017 where he built custom Polaris UTV's for an MLB promotion, as well as played in the 2017 MLB Celebrity Softball tournament.

He was hired by Nikola to design the Nikola Badger truck, of which they delved into an attempt at creating a Hydrogen fuel cell vehicle. Nikola canceled the Badger project in 2020 and Sparks purchased all of the rights to the Nikola Badger and Powersports programs which he announced via social media in February 2024. He also has mentioned his intention of bringing the Badger FCEV along with electric UTV's and Personal Watercraft to the market under a new brand, EMBR Motors. He participated in 2 episodes of motorsport event Monster Jam; in seasons 16 and 17, alongside Adam Anderson and Grave Digger.

He published the book The Diesel Brothers: A Truckin' Awesome Guide to Trucks and Life in 2017, alongside Diesel Dave. He hosts the annual Heavy Academy conference, where he lectures participants about business strategies and how to inculcate them into their ventures.

== Charity and philanthropy ==
He is well known for he and his team's fast response time to assist with Hurricane Harvey relief efforts by flying his rescue helicopter, as well as sending 6 fully loaded semi trucks with various rescue equipment to Houston in August 2018. He helped provide resources and his helicopter in the search for the corpse of teenager Dylan Rounds. He also helped stranded snow victims in California, and additionally rallied others to help. In 2022, he helped the family of late pilot Wayne Wirt extract the remains of the latter's body, as well as the wreckage of his ill-fated airplane the Mount Jefferson Wilderness, after the family had taken to the internet solicit for help due to the high cost of a professional extraction. He does an annual toy drive to gather toys for families in need each Christmas. He also helped a family with broken down truck who were harassed out of their camping space with a makeover. In February 2022, he posted, via his YouTube channel, four videos filmed over 11 days documenting an excavation of a 225-foot (69 m) deep mineshaft within the vicinity of the area husband of disappearance victim Susan Powell claimed to have gone camping the night his wife disappeared. Upon having the remains forensically analyzed, it was concluded that the bones were unlikely to be human.

He is outspoken in his support for Latin American culture and immigrants.

== Filmography ==
=== Monster Jam ===
==== Season 16 ====
No. overall	Title	Original release date
417	"Racing and Freestyle from Kansas City, MO"	August 18, 2019
All the racing and freestyle action from Arrowhead Stadium on June 15, 2019. Winners: R: Adam Anderson and Grave Digger and F: Dave 'Heavy D' Sparks and BroDozer; Commentators: Scott Jordan and Morgan Kane

==== Season 17 ====
No. overall	Title	Original release date
442	"Racing and Freestyle from San Diego, CA"	October 2, 2020
All the racing and freestyle action from Arrowhead Stadium on June 15, 2019. Winners: R: Adam Anderson and Grave Digger and F: Dave 'Heavy D' Sparks and BroDozer; Commentators: Scott Jordan and Morgan Kane

=== Diesel Brothers ===
==== Season 1 (2016) ====
No. overall	No. in season	Title	Original release date	US viewers (millions)
1	1	"Free Willy's"	January 4, 2016	N/A
2	2	"Tows Before Bros..."	January 11, 2016	N/A
3	3	"Hell Camino"	January 18, 2016	N/A
4	4	"Truck vs. Train"	January 25, 2016	N/A
5	5	"The Hole-y Grail"	February 1, 2016	N/A
6	6	"From Sweden With Love"	February 8, 2016	N/A
7	7	"Abominable SnowRam"	February 15, 2016	N/A
8	8	"Busting at the SEMA"	February 22, 2016	N/A

==== Season 2 (2017) ====
No. overall	No. in season	Title	Original release date	US viewers (millions)
9	1	"Callout Fallout"	January 16, 2017	N/A
10	2	"There Will Be Mud"	January 23, 2017	N/A
11	3	"Feed the Beast-Mode"	January 30, 2017	N/A
12	4	"Hummer Time"	February 6, 2017	N/A
13	5	"Motors and Rotors"	February 13, 2017	N/A
14	6	"Truck Norris"	February 20, 2017	N/A
15	7	"Epic Fail of the Year"	February 27, 2017	N/A
16	8	"Somersault"	March 6, 2017	N/A
17	9	"Flippin' Diesel"	March 13, 2017	N/A
18	10	"Good Bros and Goodbyes"	March 20, 2017	N/A
19	11	"Full of Bull"	April 3, 2017	N/A

==== Season 3 (2017) ====
No. overall	No. in season	Title	Original release date	US viewers (millions)
20	1	"Race Against the Machine"	September 4, 2017	N/A
21	2	"3 Axles and a Baby"	September 11, 2017	N/A
22	3	"Snow Job"	September 18, 2017	N/A
23	4	"Clash of the Titan"	September 25, 2017	N/A
24	5	"Wham, Bam, C10 Slam"	October 2, 2017	N/A
25	6	"Thunder or Lightning"	October 9, 2017	N/A
26	7	"Not So Easy Rider"	October 16, 2017	N/A
27	8	"Bros to the Rescue!"	October 23, 2017	N/A
28	9	"Hurricanes, Trucks and Snowmobiles"	October 30, 2017	N/A

==== Season 4 (2018) ====
No. overall	No. in season	Title	Original release date	US viewers (millions)
29	1	"Big Bro Bus"	July 30, 2018	N/A
30	2	"School Is in Session"	August 7, 2018	N/A
31	3	"2 Wheel Drive"	August 13, 2018	N/A
32	4	"Yo Soy Diesel"	August 20, 2018	N/A
33	5	"Diesel Defender"	August 27, 2018	N/A
34	6	"De-Ice Ice Baby"	September 3, 2018	N/A
35	7	"Yes Way, Jose"	September 10, 2018	N/A
36	8	"Tuff Truck Takedown"	September 17, 2018	N/A

==== Season 5 (2019) ====
No. overall	No. in season	Title	Original release date	US viewers (millions)
37	1	"Soar Like a Diesel"	April 8, 2019	N/A
38	2	"Diesel Dave is my Co-Pilot"	April 15, 2019	N/A
39	3	"Now Departing: Diesel Air"	April 22, 2019	N/A
40	4	"Raising Heli"	April 29, 2019	N/A
41	5	"Failure to Launch"	May 6, 2019	N/A
42	6	"When Trucks Fly"	May 13, 2019	N/A
43	7	"Prepare for Liftoff"	May 20, 2019	N/A
44	8	"Monster Jump Live"	May 27, 2019	N/A

==== Season 6 (2019) ====
No. overall	No. in season	Title	Original release date	US viewers (millions)
45	1	"Diesel Brothers Vs. The World"	December 9, 2019	N/A
46	2	"Blazer of Glory"	December 16, 2019	N/A
47	3	"Don't Tread on Diesel"	December 23, 2019	N/A
48	4	"Detroit Diesel Brothers"	January 6, 2020	N/A
49	5	"Get Pitted"	January 6, 2020	N/A

==== Season 7 (2020) ====
No. overall	No. in season	Title	Original release date	US viewers (millions)
50	1	"Diesel Nation Celebrates Memorial Day"	May 25, 2020	N/A
51	2	"Diesel Nation vs. Zombie Apocalypse"	June 1, 2020	N/A
52	3	"Diesel Nation: The Fast and the Famous"	June 8, 2020	N/A
53	4	"Diesel Nation Redemption"	June 15, 2020	N/A
54	5	"Back with a Kodiak"	June 22, 2020	N/A
56	6	"A Kraken Kodiak"	June 29, 2020	N/A
57	7	"Release the Kraken"	July 6, 2020	N/A
58	8	"Tanks A Lot"	July 13, 2020	N/A
59	9	"A Tank, an Eagle and a Brat"	July 20, 2020	N/A
60	10	"Brat vs. Eagle"	July 27, 2020	N/A

== Personal life ==
Ashley Sparks filed for divorce from 'Diesel Brothers' star Heavy D in Utah on March 10, 2026, five months after his arrest over $851,000 in unpaid Clean Air Act fines. He resides in Utah. In addition to English, he also speaks Spanish and Portuguese, having gone on a Mormon mission to Bolivia at age 19. He also traveled to Brazil for missionary work. He threw out the ceremonial first pitch of the Major League Baseball game between the Baltimore Orioles and the Detroit Tigers on 18 May 2017.

== Clean Air Act lawsuit and 2025 arrest ==
On 9 March, 2020, Sparks, Diesel Brothers cast members Keaton Hoskins and Joshua Stuart, and their companies were ordered to pay $761,451 to the U.S. government and $90,000 to Davis County in civil penalties for Clean Air Act violations. In his ruling, Chief Judge of the United States District Court for the District of Utah Robert J. Shelby found that they had violated the Clean Air Act on hundreds of occasions, in addition to violating an earlier injunction from 2018. However, they would be fined less than the maximum possible, with Judge Shelby recognizing various mitigating factors.

On 8 March 2021, Sparks and Stuart were ordered to pay $928,602 in legal fees to Utah Physicians for a Healthy Environment, on top of the $848,000 which they owed in fines to the U.S. Treasury and Davis County from previous penalty rulings over Clean Air Act-related pollution violations.

Show cause orders which were issued by Judge Shelby also resulted in both Sparks and his 2021 lawsuit co-defendant, Stuart, each being found to have liability.

On 2 October 2025, an arrest warrant was issued against Sparks for a contempt of the order charge which had been initially issued against him and his lawsuit co-defendants on 24 June 2024. On 7 October 2025, Sparks was arrested by federal marshals in Salt Lake County, Utah on multiple federal court order-related contempt charges which resulted from his failure to pay $843,602.23 which he still owed to the Utah Physicians for a Healthy Environment as a result of the 2021 lawsuit ruling. Following his arrest, Sparks was booked into the Salt Lake City's Salt Lake County jail.

On 15 October 2025, Sparks released a video on his YouTube channel titled "The Truth Behind Why I Was Thrown In Jail" where he states that he was wrongfully jailed.
