= Monster Truck (disambiguation) =

A monster truck is a custom-built vehicle with greatly oversized wheels.

Monster Truck or Monster Trucks may also refer to:

- Monster Truck (band), a Canadian rock band
- Monster Trucks (film), a sci-fi action film released in late 2016
- "Monster Trucks", a 2001 episode of Modern Marvels
- "Monster Truck", a 2001 episode of Scrapheap Challenge
- "Monster Trucks", a 2006 episode of Police Camera Action!
- "Monster Trucks", a 2008 episode of America's Toughest Jobs
- "Monster Truck (Don't Touch My)", a 2021 song by Tom Cardy from Artificial Intelligence (EP)
- Dark Haul, a 2014 TV movie starring Tom Sizemore, also known as Monster Truck
- Rolling Vengeance, a 1987 exploitation film also known Monster Truck
- Mini monster truck

== See also ==
- List of monster trucks
