= Disappearance of Susan Powell =

Missing American woman (born 1981)

Susan Powell
- Susan and Joshua Powell with their sons Charles and Braden
- Born: Susan Marie Cox; October 16, 1981; New Mexico, U.S.
- Disappeared: December 6, 2009 (aged 28); West Valley City, Utah, U.S.
- Status: Missing for 16 years, 11 months and 14 days
- Known for: Missing person; believed murdered by husband
- Spouse: Joshua Powell (m. 2001)
- Children: 2
- Website: Susan Cox Powell Foundation

On December 6, 2009, Susan Marie Powell, a 28‑year‑old mother of two from West Valley City, Utah, disappeared from her home under suspicious circumstances. Her husband, Joshua Powell, was identified by police as a person of interest but was never charged. In February 2012, after a court awarded temporary custody of the couple's two sons to her parents, Joshua killed the children and himself in a deliberate house explosion during a supervised visit.

The investigation uncovered blood evidence in the Powell home, financial actions taken by Joshua after Susan's disappearance, and statements from the children indicating that Susan had accompanied the family on the night Joshua claimed to have taken them on a late‑night camping trip. Police later focused on Joshua's father, Steven Powell, after finding voyeuristic recordings of Susan, young girls, and other women; Steven was arrested in 2011 on voyeurism and child pornography charges. Investigators also focused on Joshua's brother Michael, who abandoned a car at a wrecking yard in Oregon shortly after Susan vanished.

In 2013, Michael died by suicide. That same year, West Valley City police closed their active investigation, stating their belief that Joshua had murdered Susan and that Michael helped him conceal her body. Despite searches, legal proceedings, and renewed efforts to locate remains, Susan has never been found, and attempts to have her legally declared dead have continued.

== Background ==
Susan Cox met Joshua Powell through their LDS Church Institute of Religion course, and the two reconnected at a dinner gathering in his Tacoma apartment in November 2000. They began a relationship soon afterward and married in the Portland Oregon Temple in April 2001. After their wedding, Susan and Joshua briefly lived with Joshua's father, Steven Powell, in South Hill, Washington. During this period, Steven developed an inappropriate fixation on Susan, secretly filming her, spying on her with a mirror while she used the bathroom, stealing her underwear, reading her journals, and posting love songs about her online under a pseudonym. In 2003, he confessed his feelings to her; the exchange was unintentionally recorded on his camcorder microphone. Susan rejected him, and she and Joshua moved out of state soon afterward, partly to distance themselves from Steven.

The couple later settled in West Valley City, Utah, where Susan worked for Wells Fargo Investments and raised their two sons, Charles (born 2005) and Braden (born 2007). Although she maintained a stable outward life, Susan privately documented increasing strain within the marriage. Her journals and emails described tension over Joshua's refusal to attend church with the family and his continued contact with Steven despite his behavior toward her. Friends also noted what they described as Joshua's controlling behavior and his heavy spending. In 2007, Joshua filed for bankruptcy, reporting more than $200,000 in debt.

By 2008, Susan recorded video of property damage she attributed to Joshua and wrote a private will stating that her marriage was in "extreme turmoil." She added that if she were to die, "it may not be an accident, even if it looks like one."

== Disappearance ==
On the morning of December 6, 2009, Susan, Charles, and Braden attended church. A neighbor visited the family at their home that afternoon and left at about 5:00 p.m. This was the last time Susan was seen by anyone outside the Powell household. Relatives reported the entire family missing on December 7 after the children were not dropped off at daycare. Joshua's mother, Terrica, and his estranged sister, Jennifer, went to the Powell residence but were unable to reach either Joshua or Susan. Police entered the home out of concern for possible carbon monoxide poisoning. No one was inside, but officers noted two box fans blowing on a wet spot on the couch. Susan did not report to work that day, and her purse, wallet, and identification were found inside the house. Her cell phone was later located in the family's only vehicle, a Chrysler Town & Country minivan that Joshua had been using.

Later that afternoon, at about 5:00 p.m., Joshua returned home with the two boys and was taken to the police station for questioning. He told investigators that he had left Susan sleeping at home shortly after midnight on December 7 and had taken his sons on a camping trip to the Pony Express Trail in western Utah. Police searched the area on December 10 but found no evidence of the campsite Joshua described. Investigators also noted that he had taken the boys out after midnight in blizzard conditions, despite their scheduled daycare attendance only hours later. Joshua had not informed his employer that he would miss work and told police he believed it was Sunday rather than Monday.

After a second round of questioning on the evening of December 8, Joshua rented a car at Salt Lake City International Airport. His whereabouts after leaving the airport were not accounted for. Approximately 18 hours later, at about 4:00 p.m. on December 9, he called his mother from a new phone while driving south toward Salt Lake City on Interstate 84 near Tremonton. He later told his sister that he had been driving around the area, getting on and off freeways at random. Police later determined that Joshua had placed 807 miles on the rental car during the period it was in his possession.

== Investigation ==
During a search of the Powell residence on December 9, investigators found traces of Susan's blood on the floor, life insurance policies on her totaling US$1.5 million, and a handwritten letter in which she expressed fear for her life. DNA test results released in 2013 identified one blood sample as Susan's, while another sample was attributed to an "unknown male contributor".

In August 2012, West Valley City police released documents indicating that Joshua took several actions considered suspicious after Susan's disappearance. He liquidated her retirement accounts, canceled her regularly scheduled chiropractic appointments, and withdrew the children from daycare. Investigators also learned that he had previously spoken to coworkers about how to hide a body in an abandoned mineshaft in the western Utah desert.

Police interviewed the Powells' older son, Charles, who confirmed that the camping trip described by Joshua had taken place. However, unlike his father, he stated that Susan had gone with them and did not return. Weeks after her disappearance, a teacher reported that Charles had said his mother was dead. Susan's parents, Chuck and Judy Cox, also stated that several months later, while at daycare, Braden drew a picture of a van with three people in it and told staff, "Mommy was in the trunk."

Investigators announced plans to question Joshua again and subpoenaed all aired and unaired footage of him from local television stations. On December 14, Joshua retained an attorney, and police reported that he had become increasingly uncooperative. A few days later, he took his sons to Puyallup to stay with his father for the holidays. By December 24, he was considered a person of interest by investigators. On January 6, 2010, Joshua returned with his brother Michael to pack the family's belongings, indicating that he intended to move permanently to Puyallup.

== Developments in 2010–2012 ==
The Powells lived in West Valley City, Utah, when Susan disappeared in 2009. Joshua Powell killed himself and their children Charles and Braden Powell in South Hill, Washington, in 2012.

In Puyallup, Joshua lived with his two sons, his father Steven, his brothers Michael and John, and his sister Alina. He indicated that he planned to rent out his house in Utah. Reports stated that he returned to Puyallup after losing his job in West Valley City.

Soon afterward, the website SusanPowell.org was launched. Described as "the official website of Susan Powell," its anonymous posts portrayed Joshua as the target of a smear campaign by Susan's family, his estranged sister Jennifer, and the LDS Church. Additional entries speculated that Susan's disappearance was connected to that of Steven Koecher, a former journalist who vanished in Nevada the same week, and suggested that the two had run off to Brazil together. Joshua and Steven were widely believed to have written the posts. In late 2010, both men claimed that Susan had abandoned her family due to mental illness and had left with another man. Susan's family rejected these claims as "unsupported" by any evidence.

Investigators' scrutiny extended to Steven after learning from a family friend that he had been obsessed with Susan. A search of his home in 2010 uncovered 4,500 images of her taken without her knowledge, including close‑ups of specific body parts. Police also focused on Michael after discovering that he had sold his broken‑down Ford Taurus to a wrecking yard in Pendleton, Oregon, shortly after Susan's disappearance, and had later ordered satellite images of the lot. When police located the vehicle, a cadaver dog indicated that decomposing human remains had been present in the trunk. DNA testing was inconclusive.

On September 14, 2011, Utah authorities located a possible gravesite while searching Topaz Mountain, a desert area near Nephi, that Joshua had frequently visited as a campsite. The site showed signs of recent soil disturbance and shoveling, but after digging several feet, investigators found no remains. Federal anthropologists ruled out the possibility of an ancient burial ground. Police continued examining the area but did not explain why they had initially announced the discovery of remains when none were confirmed. Authorities stated they were following a scent detected by search dogs.

Relations between the Powell and Cox families grew increasingly strained. After police raided the Powell home in 2011, both Joshua and Steven spoke to major news outlets about journals Susan had allegedly written concerning her relationship with Steven. Steven claimed that he and Susan had been falling in love before her disappearance and cited the journals—written when Susan was a teenager—as evidence that she was mentally unstable and might have left with another man. A judge issued a permanent injunction preventing Joshua and Steven from publishing any material from Susan's journals and ordered them to return or destroy any copies already released.

On September 22, Steven was arrested on charges of voyeurism and child pornography after police found evidence that he had secretly recorded young girls and numerous women, including Susan. John Long, assistant attorney general for Washington State, stated that Joshua was a "subject" in the investigation. A friend of Steven said he was preoccupied with pornography and "was hung up on [Susan] sexually." The following day, Susan's father, Chuck Cox, filed for custody. A Washington court granted him temporary custody, ruling that Joshua would need to move out of Steven's residence to regain custody. Joshua rented a house in South Hill, though authorities later alleged that he had not actually moved in and had only attempted to make it appear that he had complied with the court's order.

In late September 2011, Jennifer stated publicly that she believed her brother Joshua was "responsible for his wife Susan Powell's disappearance." His other sister, Alina, had also been suspicious of him but later withdrew her concerns and said Joshua had been unfairly targeted by investigators. By this time, West Valley City had spent more than half a million dollars on the case. On September 28, Mayor Mike Winder said the expense was justified, stating, "We feel that we are getting to that tipping point where we have more hot evidence than we have had in the past two years," and that the case was progressing.

Later in 2011, Joshua underwent a series of court‑ordered evaluations in Washington. Conducted by James Manley, the assessments found that Joshua had adequate parenting skills, a stable employment history, and no criminal record or documented history of domestic violence. However, Manley also noted concerns related to the ongoing criminal investigations, Joshua's reluctance to acknowledge personal shortcomings, his overbearing behavior with his sons, and his persistent defensiveness and paranoia, which were attributed to police and media scrutiny combined with underlying narcissistic traits. Manley initially recommended that Joshua receive supervised visitation with his sons several times a week.

West Valley City police later found approximately 400 images of simulated child pornography, bestiality, and incest on a computer seized from the Powell residence. In January 2012, a Utah judge authorized police to share the material with the Washington Attorney General's Office, the Pierce County Sheriff's Office, and the Washington court overseeing the child welfare case. At the time, Utah authorities told Washington officials that the images came from Joshua's computer. (A 2019 KSL investigation later reported that the images had been cached by a previous owner before Susan purchased the device.) Utah authorities accused Joshua of viewing the material. Although the images were not illegal due to their hand‑drawn or cartoon‑style format, Manley considered them a matter of "great concern" particularly given Joshua's earlier denial of possessing such content. He recommended a more extensive psychosexual evaluation and a polygraph test but did not suggest changes to the visitation schedule.

Meanwhile, Michael Powell created a Google Sites page alleging that Susan's parents were abusing and neglecting the children in cooperation with child welfare authorities. He also claimed that West Valley City police had mishandled the investigation and were harassing Joshua. Attorneys for the Cox family disputed the allegations, and Google removed the site after several days for violating its terms of use.

== Murders of Charles and Braden Powell ==
Murders of Charles and Braden Powell
- Location: South Hill, Washington, U.S.
- Date: February 5, 2012; 14 years ago
- Attack type: Double murder-suicide, familicide, filicide, child murder, arson
- Weapons: Carbon monoxide poisoning, hatchet, arson
- Deaths: 3 (including the perpetrator)
- Victims: Charles Powell; Braden Powell
- Perpetrator: Joshua Powell
- Motive: Loss of custody battle

On February 5, 2012, social worker Elizabeth Griffin Hall called 9-1-1 after taking Charles and Braden to a supervised visit at Joshua's house in South Hill. Hall, who was assigned to monitor the visit, reported that Joshua grabbed his sons and prevented her from entering the home. Moments later, the house exploded, killing Joshua and the two children. Local authorities treated the incident as a double murder-suicide, stating that the explosion appeared to have been deliberate.

When authorities notified Steven, who was in jail at the time, he "didn't seem very upset by the news, but was angry towards authorities who notified him." Two weeks later, Steven invoked his Fifth Amendment right not to answer questions about Susan's disappearance. Chuck Cox and others stated that they believed Steven knew what had happened to Susan. Steven was convicted on voyeurism charges in May 2012, in a trial that largely avoided discussion of Susan's case.

Charles and Braden are buried at Woodbine Cemetery in Puyallup, Washington, where a memorial for their mother is also located. Joshua's remains were cremated. After a brief investigation, officials confirmed that the explosion had been deliberately planned. The official cause of death for Joshua and the two boys was carbon monoxide poisoning, although the coroner noted that both children had significant chopping injuries to the head and neck. A hatchet was recovered near Joshua's body, and investigators believe he used it to attack the boys before being overcome by smoke and fumes.

The fire investigation found two five‑gallon cans of gasoline in the home, along with evidence that gasoline had been spread throughout the residence. Friends and relatives told authorities that Joshua had emailed them minutes before the explosion to say goodbye. Some recipients, including his local bishop, received instructions on locating his money and shutting off his utilities. Records also showed that Joshua had withdrawn $7,000 from his bank account and had donated his children's toys and books to local charities the day before the incident. Joshua named his brother Michael as the primary beneficiary of his life insurance policy.

== Aftermath ==
On February 11, 2013, approximately one year after the deaths of Joshua and his sons, his brother Michael died by suicide in Minneapolis after jumping from the roof of a parking garage. Police had questioned Michael several times in 2012 after discovering his abandoned Ford at the Oregon wrecking yard. Investigators described him as "evasive" when asked why he had left the car at that location. Utah authorities later stated their belief that Joshua and Michael were accomplices in Susan's murder. West Valley City police closed their active investigation into Susan's disappearance on May 21, 2013. In a February 2013 interview, James Manley—who conducted the 2011–2012 evaluations of Joshua for Washington State authorities—acknowledged that he suspected Joshua was involved in Susan's disappearance. He did not include these suspicions in his report because they were outside the scope of his assignment and because Joshua had not been charged with any crime.

Jennifer, Joshua's estranged sister, wrote a memoir with co‑author Emily Clawson about the Powell family's history. The book, A Light in Dark Places, was published in June 2013. Jennifer said she was inspired to write it, "to help other people to recognize abuse in either their own relationships or relationships around them because it's not always completely apparent." In March 2015, Chuck Cox won a lengthy court dispute with Terrica and Alina Powell over control of Susan's estate. Terrica and Alina had sought to have Susan declared legally dead in order to collect life insurance benefits, but Cox ultimately gained full control of the estate.

The Cox family also sued Washington's Department of Social and Health Services (DSHS) and its social workers, alleging that the agency prioritized Joshua's parental rights over the safety of Charles and Braden, enabling their deaths. In 2015, a federal court granted summary judgment to the defendants, ruling that the social workers had immunity and that DSHS was not negligent. In 2019, an appeals court partially overturned that decision, ruling that the social workers retained immunity but that the question of DSHS's negligence could proceed to trial.

At trial, a jury found DSHS negligent and awarded $98 million to the estates of Susan's two sons. Susan's family also urged lawmakers in Washington and Utah to pass legislation restricting or blocking visitation rights for parents under investigation for murder. Steven Powell was released from prison on July 11, 2017, after serving nearly six years following his voyeurism and child pornography convictions. He died of natural causes in Tacoma, Washington, on July 23, 2018.

In 2019, Salt Lake City radio station KSL released an analysis of the cartoon pornography images found by West Valley City police on the Powell computer. According to the podcast Cold produced by KSL, Susan purchased the second‑hand computer for her own use about three months before her disappearance, while the images were likely downloaded about six months before she acquired the device. Dave Cawley, the host of Cold, declined to identify the computer's previous owners, stating that the device had been kept in a common area of a household where multiple people could have accessed it. No criminal charges have been filed in connection with the images.

Susan remains a missing person. Given the deaths of her sons, it is widely believed that she was murdered by Joshua. As of March 2018, there were calls to have her declared legally dead, with the cause of death listed as unknown and the manner of death as homicide. In early 2022, a cave exploration crew led by Diesel Brothers personality Dave Sparks searched a mine shaft in the Utah desert for Susan's remains. The team found several rib bones, possible vertebrae, scraps of clothing, and other potential evidence. DNA testing later determined that none of the bones belonged to Susan and that they were animal remains. Pants recovered with the bones tested positive for male DNA, and the Cox family is attempting to identify the individual.

== In media ==
The case was featured in an episode of Deadly Sins. In October 2018, the Crime Junkie podcast covered the case in an episode titled "Murdered: The Powell Family". Dave Cawley, a reporter for KSL Newsradio in Salt Lake City, launched a podcast on the case in November 2018. The podcast, titled Cold, presented previously unreleased evidence and information, including voice and video recordings, interviews, and other materials. On February 10, 2021, a television series development deal for Cold was announced. In December 2018, Investigation Discovery premiered an 85-minute documentary titled Susan Powell: An ID Murder Mystery.

A documentary titled The Disappearance of Susan Cox Powell premiered on Oxygen in May 2019. The two‑night special was promoted as a "definitive" account of the investigation and included previously unseen videos recorded by Steven Powell, which had been seized by police during his arrest. The documentary also featured interviews with individuals who had not spoken publicly before, including Joshua's sister Alina. In July 2019, the Morbid podcast discussed the case in its 82nd episode "The Tragic Case of Susan Powell: Mini Morbid." In December 2019, the podcast And That's Why We Drink covered the case in its 152nd episode. Gregg Olsen and Rebecca Morris also wrote about the case in their book If I Can’t Have You: Susan Powell, Her Mysterious Disappearance, and the Murder of Her Children.

In February 2022, the YouTube channel HeavyDSparks, owned by Dave 'Heavy D' Sparks, a producer of the Discovery Channel series Diesel Brothers, posted four videos documenting an 11‑day excavation of a 225-foot (69 m) mineshaft. The shaft was located near the area where Joshua claimed to have gone camping the night Susan disappeared. The headframe had been burned and collapsed into the shaft around the time of Susan's disappearance. Sparks and his team removed approximately 40,000 pounds of dirt and debris before finding bones of unknown origin and pieces of clothing. Forensic analysis later concluded that the bones were very unlikely to be human. In June 2022, the Killer Queens podcast covered the case in a two-part episode (episode 221). In September 2022, the British podcast Redhanded also covered the case in a two-part episode.

== See also ==
- Bitter Blood
- Hart family murders
- List of people who disappeared mysteriously (2000–present)
- Murder of Carol DiMaiti
- Murder of Hannah Clarke
- Murder of Lori Hacking
- Murders of Andrew Bagby and Zachary Turner
