= Ryan Anderson (monster truck driver) =

American monster truck driver (born 1989)

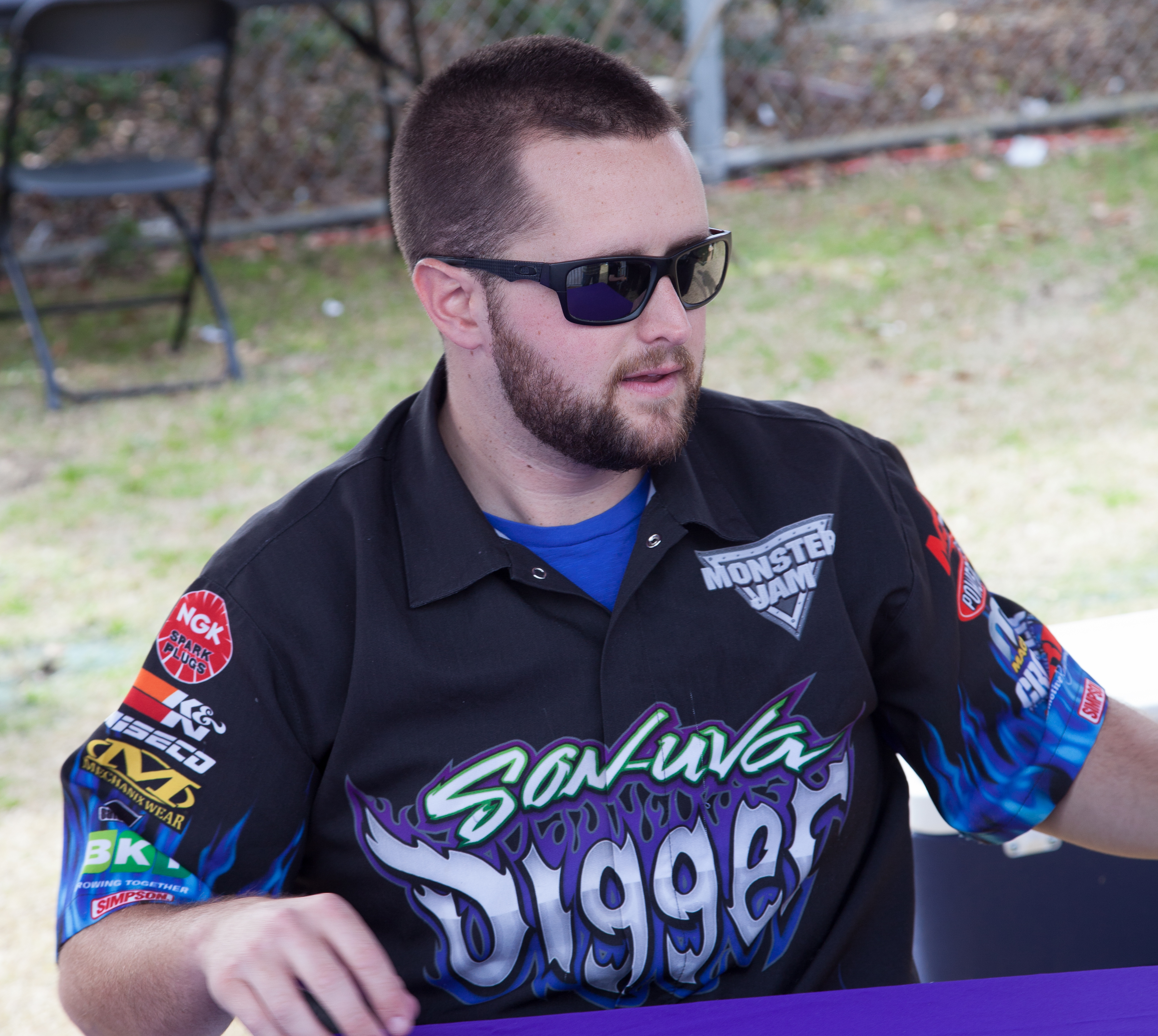
- Anderson in 2015

Personal information
- Nationality: American
- Born: November 16, 1989 (age 36) Norfolk, Virginia, U.S.
- Years active: 2010–present
- Spouse: Chelsea Hietpas (m. 2024)
- Children: 2
- Parent: Dennis Anderson (father)
- Relatives: 2 brothers and 1 sister (including: Adam and Krysten)

Sport
- Country: United States
- Sport: Monster Jam
- Team: Son-Uva Digger

Achievements and titles
- World finals: Racing: 2017; Freestyle: 2018; High Jump: 2022, 2023, 2025

Ryan Anderson (born November 16, 1989) is an American professional monster truck driver. He currently drives Son-Uva Digger on the Monster Jam circuit. A second-generation monster truck driver, Ryan is the son of Grave Digger creator Dennis Anderson and the younger brother of fellow driver Adam, and the older brother of Krysten and Weston Anderson. He is a five time Monster Jam World Champion. Ryan currently resides in his hometown of Poplar Branch, North Carolina.

== Career ==
Like his brother Adam, Anderson was introduced to monster trucks by his father, Dennis Anderson, at a young age. He would go on tours with him when he was not in school.

He began driving in Monster Jam in 2010, first driving for Monster Mutt. He won Rookie of the Year honors after the season. He occasionally drove for Spider-Man at Mexico City and Cincinnati that year.

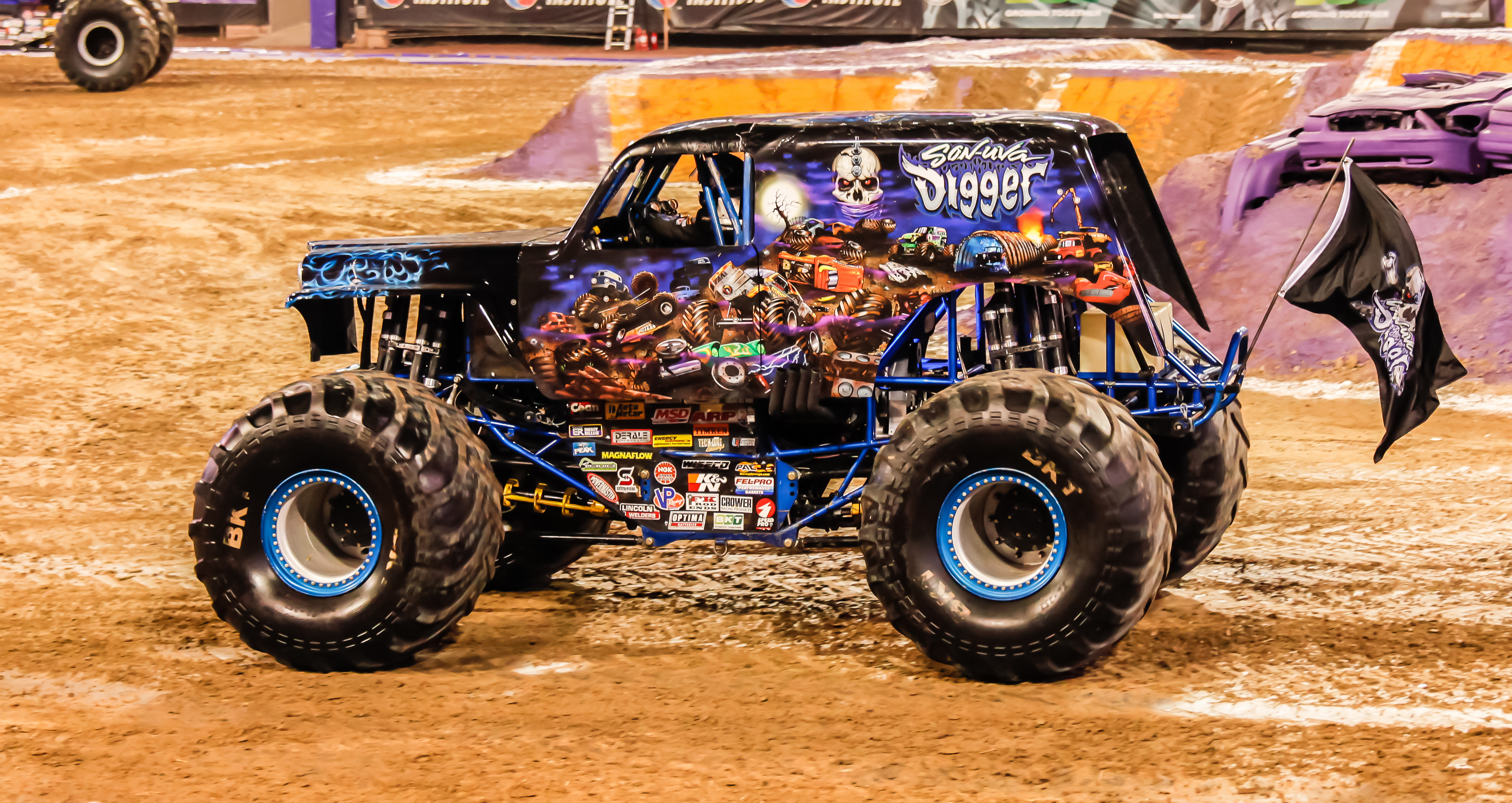
Anderson driving Son-Uva Digger in 2015.

He debuted Son-Uva Digger in 2011, and has been competing in that truck ever since. In the freestyle encore, Anderson would successfully land a perfect backflip.

Anderson made his first Monster Jam World Finals debut in 2012. In racing, Anderson made it to the third round, but was eliminated after losing to Wolverine. In freestyle, Anderson would attempt a backflip once again, but the attempt was unsuccessful due to El Toro Loco being stuck there on the backflip ramp.

In 2014, he won the Save of the Year award, along with the Stadium Freestyle of the Year award. He made his third Monster Jam World Finals debut that season. In racing, he would only make it to the second round, after getting eliminated by Bounty Hunter. In freestyle, he would place 18th with a score of 22.5.

In 2015, at Monster Jam World Finals 16, he was in contention of winning his first racing championship, after making it to the final round. He would lose the race after his truck rolled over while going into the turn. Metal Mulisha would win the championship instead.

In 2017, he would officially get his first Monster Jam World Finals championship in the racing portion, beating out Tyler Menninga in the final round. He would win his second championship next year in the freestyle portion.

In 2020, Anderson drove for Bakugan Dragonoid, after the series was put on hold due to the COVID-19 pandemic. That same year, he would break the world record for the farthest bicycle (side wheelie) in a monster truck, which was 891 feet and 10.08 inches.

He continued driving for Bakugan Dragonoid in 2021, where he won the Stadium Series championship. He returned to Son-Uva Digger in the summer, and currently competes in the Stadium Series championship as of 2022.

== Awards ==
- Monster Jam World Finals Racing Championships: 2017
- Monster Jam World Finals Freestyle Championships: 2018
- Monster Jam World Finals High Jump Championships: 2022, 2023, 2025
- 2010 Monster Jam Rookie of the Year Award
- 2014 Monster Jam Save of the Year Award
- 2014 Monster Jam Stadium Freestyle of the Year Award
- 2015 Monster Jam Stadium Freestyle of the Year Award
- 2016 Monster Jam Wow Factor of the Year Award
- 2017 Monster Jam Stadium Tour 3 Champion
- 2018 Monster Jam Wow Factor of the Year Award
- 2018 Monster Jam Stadium Freestyle of the Year Award
- 2019 Monster Jam Stadium Two-Wheel Skill of the Year Award
- 2019 Monster Jam Stadium Freestyle of the Year Award
- 2019 Monster Jam All Star Challenge Chicago Style Racing Champion
- 2019 Monster Jam All Star Challenge Freestyle Winner
- 2019 Monster Jam All Star Challenge Overall Event Champion
- World Record Holder for Longest Bicycle in a Monster Truck (271.83m)
- 2021 Monster Jam Stadium Series Champion

== Personal life ==
Anderson has 2 sons, Halen, born December 7, 2023 and Nash, born August 10, 2026 with wife Chelsea, whom he married on November 9, 2024.
