= Dennis Anderson =

American monster truck driver (born 1960)

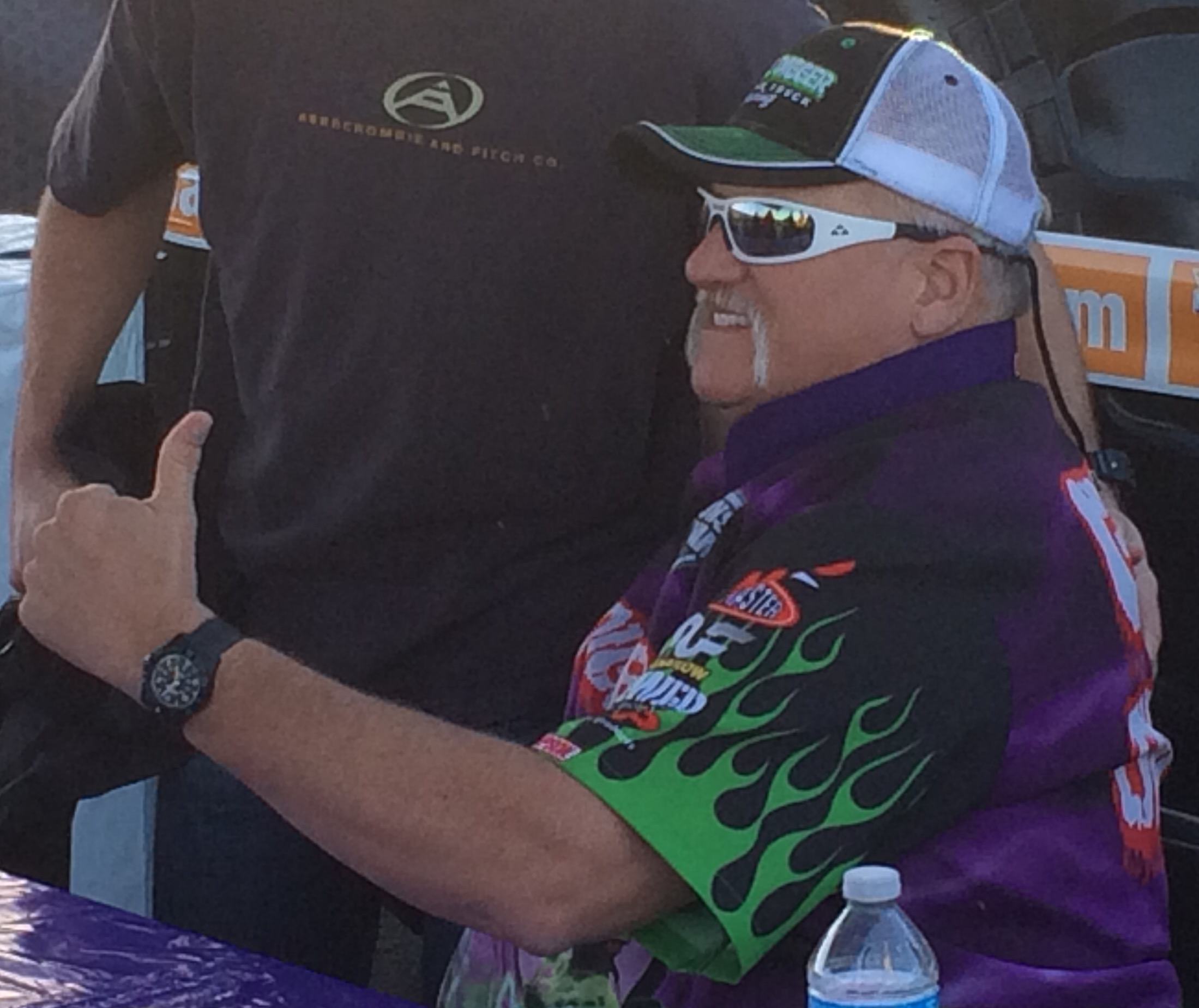
- Anderson in 2016

Personal information
- Full name: Dennis Montague Anderson
- Born: October 24, 1960 (age 65) Norfolk, Virginia, U.S.
- Spouse: Carisa Myers (m. 2005)
- Children: 4 (including Adam (b. 1985), Ryan (b. 1989), Krysten (b. 1997), and Weston (b. 2002))

Sport
- Country: United States
- Sport: Monster Jam
- Team: Grave Digger
- Retired: 2017

Achievements and titles
- World finals: Racing: 2004, 2006, 2010; Freestyle: 2000

Dennis Montague Anderson (born October 24, 1960) is an American former professional monster truck driver. He is the creator, team owner, and former driver of "Grave Digger" on the USHRA Monster Jam circuit. Anderson is from Kill Devil Hills, North Carolina, where he currently resides. Nicknamed "the Icon", he is often regarded as one of the greatest monster truck drivers of all time. Anderson has won four Monster Jam World titles, including a freestyle title in 2000, and three racing titles in 2004, 2006, and 2010.

== Career ==
Anderson started out as a mud bogger with his original truck in 1982. His career started when he first worked on a farm at the time for a wealthy family. One day the boss's son came in talking smack calling Dennis’s 1952 Ford pickup truck painted in red primer, junk, and it would not make it through the mud like his truck would. So Dennis, offended, talked back to the boss's son and told him "I'll take this junk and dig you a Grave!" The other workers, impressed, wrote "Grave Digger" on Dennis’s time card. When Dennis got home that day he spray painted Grave Digger on the door. And that weekend Dennis met with the boss's son along with his friends at the mud hole and won.

The truck was later rebuilt with larger wheels and using a 1951 Ford panel truck painted in silver and blue. At one local show, a scheduled monster truck failed to appear and Anderson, who already had large tractor tires on the truck, offered to crush cars in the absence of the full-size monster truck. The success of the event led Anderson to pursue monster trucks as a career.

In 1986, Grave Digger was further modified and first received its distinctive black graveyard paint scheme. In 1987 and 1988 Anderson drove the truck primarily at TNT Motor sports races. In 1988 Anderson beat Bigfoot in Saint Paul, Minnesota, on a show taped for ESPN.

Anderson moved to a newly built Grave Digger 2 in 1989, made with a 1950 Chevrolet panel van body. TNT began promoting Grave Digger heavily, especially for races on the Tuff Trax syndicated television series and ESPN's Powertrax. This was helped by Bigfoot running a limited schedule in the 1989 championship as the team constructed Bigfoot 8. During the same year, construction of Grave Digger 3 had begun. While Dennis drove Grave Digger 2, his brother Leslie drove Grave Digger 1.

When TNT became a part of the USHRA in 1991, Anderson began running on the USHRA tour and debuted his first four-link suspension truck, Grave Digger 3.

In 1992, after Anderson was injured during an event in Louisville, Kentucky, he decided to build a better truck with a similar short wheelbase and a new tube frame, therefore Grave Digger 7 was constructed (numbers 4 and 5 having been franchised to other drivers and number 6 being a street-legal display truck). He drove that truck from 1992 until 1996, and was a regular on the USHRA syndicated series "Monster Wars". In 1997 he built and debuted Grave Digger 12, which would be inherited by former Carolina Crusher driver Gary Porter in early 2001.

In late 1998, due to his financial difficulties, Anderson sold the Grave Digger team to SRO/Pace, then-owners of the USHRA, leading to controversy and accusations of rigged races due to Anderson driving for the same company that runs the events. In 1999 he won his first championship in the USHRA series. In 2001, he drove Mr. Destruction into a wall of cars as a special stunt for a show in the Louisiana Superdome. Anderson won the inaugural Monster Jam World Finals freestyle championship in 2000, and scored a racing championship win at the 2004 World Finals. He won another racing championship at the 2006 World Finals driving Grave Digger 20. Anderson has also won the 2010 World Finals Racing Championship also driving Grave Digger. Anderson also became the second driver to attempt the LeDuc Leap in the 2014 World Finals also driving Grave Digger.

Anderson was also a co-host on History Channel's Around the World in 80 Ways.

Anderson's final event as a competitor took place in Tampa, Florida, at Raymond James Stadium on January 14, 2017, as he was injured and forced to miss the rest of the season. During Monster Jam's 2018 Season Kickoff Show on September 18, 2017, Anderson announced his retirement from the sport. He stated he would remain "behind the scenes" at events, working in the pits with his team.

== Injuries ==
Anderson has had several injuries over his career. In late 1991 he broke his kneecap when he hit a wall at the Rosemont Horizon in Chicago, forcing him to sit out the 1992 winter season. He recovered and beat Jack Willman Jr. in Taurus at Carter Finley Stadium in Raleigh, North Carolina. Later in 1992, a hard side hit on the wall of Louisville Motor Speedway in Louisville, Kentucky broke several ribs near his backbone and caused recurring problems throughout his career. A nose-dive, AKA the lawn dart, at the Louisiana Superdome in New Orleans in 1999 aggravated the injury and caused Anderson to miss several shows over the next couple of years. He reinjured himself at a Special Events show in Bloomsburg, Pennsylvania. A broken hand from a non-driving accident in Philadelphia 2003 sat him out for half of the year. A lesser-known injury happened during the summer of 2006 in a non-monster truck accident when Anderson injured his wrist. He also suffered a shoulder injury at the Metrodome in late 2006, in which his son Adam Anderson drove Grave Digger at shows in early 2007 until The Monster Jam World Finals 8.

In 2017, Anderson was hospitalized following an accident while attempting a backflip. On March 10, 2017, it was announced that Anderson would not compete in World Finals 18 due to the previously stated injury. He would retire later that year.

== Awards ==
- Motor Madness World Finals Points Champion - 1999
- USHRA World Finals Freestyle Champion – 2000
- USHRA World Finals Racing Champion – 2004, 2006, 2010
- Inducted in the International Monster Truck Hall of Fame - 2012
- Inducted in the Monster Jam Hall Of Fame - 2020
