= Krysten Anderson =

American monster truck driver (born 1997)

Personal information
- Born: May 16, 1997 (age 28) Currituck, North Carolina, U.S.
- Years active: 2017–present
- Parent: Dennis Anderson (father)
- Relative(s): 3 brothers (including: Adam and Ryan)

Sport
- Country: United States
- Sport: Monster Jam
- Team: Grave Digger

Krysten Anderson (born May 16, 1997) is an American professional monster truck driver. Anderson currently drives Grave Digger on the Monster Jam circuit and is the first full-time female driver for the team. She is the daughter of Grave Digger creator Dennis Anderson. She holds the record for the highest ramp jump by a monster truck at 33 ft 9.6 in (10.3 m).

== Early life ==
Krysten Anderson was born on May 16, 1997, in Currituck, North Carolina. Anderson has stated that she has been surrounded by monster trucks since she was just a few months old.

== Career ==
Anderson first got behind the wheel of a monster truck when she was 18. Prior to Monster Jam, Anderson was planning on going to college for graphic design with the intention of becoming a graphic designer for the Monster Jam trucks. Anderson joined Monster Jam in 2016 and began driving for the Grave Digger Team in 2017, the same year her father Dennis Anderson was celebrating his 35th anniversary of driving Grave Digger. Her father retired that same year due to an injury. Monster Jam contacted her dad to see if she was interested in competing as the first female driver for Grave Digger. She won her first freestyle competition in the second event she competed in. Speaking of her first year competing in Monster Jam, Anderson stated, "I had a very rough first year...I was brand new. I was a rookie. I was driving Grave Digger, which is basically the most iconic truck in monster truck history or Monster Jam history. I had the pressure of being an Anderson and my dad and my brothers had always brought the show home all the time. They were always some of the top competitors. I was like, 'Man, I’ve got to be good because I’m an Anderson. I've got to be good because I’m driving Grave Digger and everybody wants Grave Digger to do good. I'm also out here representing all of the girls."

On June 25, 2020, Anderson broke the Guinness World Record for the highest ramp jump by a monster truck at 33 ft 9.6 in (10.3 m) in Bradenton, Florida. The previous record was 21.33ft/6.5m. Anderson became the first female Monster Jam series champion when she won the Arena Series Central championship in 2022. She won the Rising Star Award in 2022.

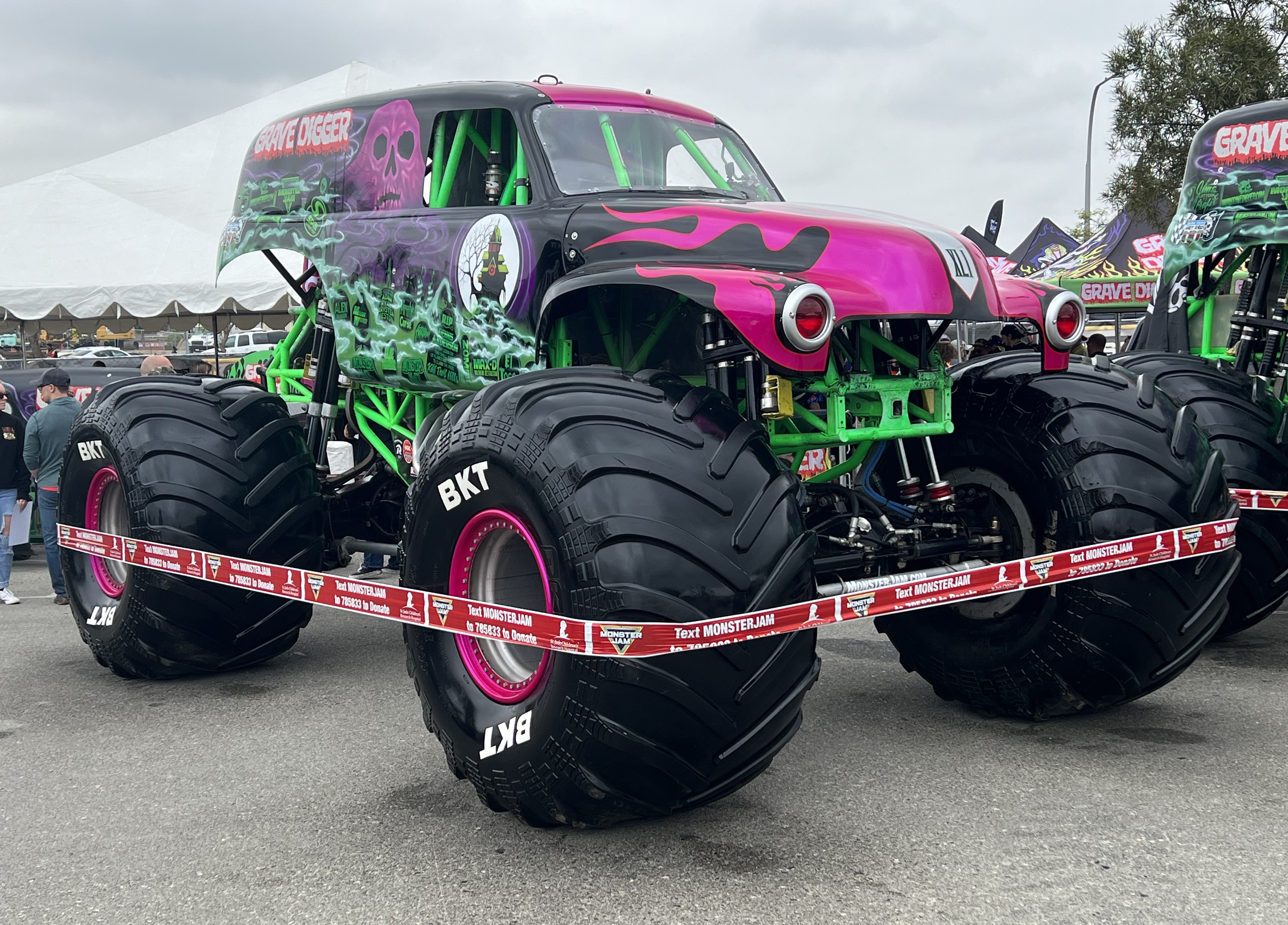
Grave Digger XLI truck, driven by Krysten Anderson 2024

In an online bio, Anderson stated, "Monster Jam is all I know. I was born into the sport through my dad...During the peak of his career was the early stage of my life, and one of the coolest things was my dad being the Grave Digger creator."

== Awards ==
- 2021: Save of the Year
- 2022: Arena Series Central Champion
- 2022: Rising Star of the Year
