= Chihuahua monster truck accident =

2013 monster truck crash into spectators

- Date: 5 October 2013
- Location: Chihuahua City, Mexico
- Cause: Truck swerving into the crowd
- Perpetrator: Monster truck
- Deaths: 8
- Injuries: 79
- Convicted: Francisco Velazquez Samaniego
- Sentence: 5 years

The Chihuahua monster truck accident occurred on 5 October 2013 in Chihuahua City, Mexico, when a monster truck crashed into spectators at an air show. Eight people were reported killed, and 79 were injured. Officials and event organizers were blamed for the disaster. To date, it is the deadliest monster truck incident to have occurred.

== Accident ==
The Extreme Aeroshow was being held at the El Rejon dam, on the outskirts of Chihuahua City. Carlos Gonzalez, spokesman for the Chihuahua state prosecutors' office, said that the driver "appeared to lose control of the truck after leaping over cars it was crushing during a demonstration".

It was reported that the outdoor arena lacked any visible barriers.

The driver was detained and said in a statement that he hit his head on something inside the cabin and lost consciousness.

== Investigation ==
Governor of Chihuahua César Duarte Jáquez said his administration was investigating whether the Civil Protection authorities had correctly enforced safety regulations. Governor Jáquez announced 3 days of mourning.

Francisco Velázquez Samaniego, the driver of the monster truck, was convicted of reckless homicide and inflicting injury and damage. He was sentenced to five years in prison and ordered to pay MXN$26 million in restitution. Velázquez maintained that he was unconscious at the time of the accident, and that he had warned organizers that the spectators were too close. He was the only person convicted in relation to the accident.
