= Mini monster truck =

Entertainment vehicle designed for children

A mini monster truck is a four-wheeled vehicle built on a tubular chassis. It has four wheel steering and four wheel drive. A mini monster truck is styled after and resembling an actual monster truck and built on a smaller scale than a standard monster truck. Mini monster trucks are typically custom-built vehicles, and are most frequently used in youth sports entertainment with child drivers. Mini monster trucks typically have the same features as standard monster trucks, usually to half-size or one-third scale. The mini monster truck is not a modified truck, but it is designed and built from the ground up just like a full-sized monster truck. Special features are built in to allow for an adult to move it around when the child drivers are not available.

The mini monster trucks have custom braking systems with brake boosters to assist child drivers, adjustable pedal systems to allow for the movement of the controls for various ages and sizes, custom five point safety harness systems that are adjustable, and movable control panels to allow for the different arm lengths to adapt to a child's age, weight, and height.

There is an electric or hydraulic body lift for the replaceable fiberglass body. Mini monster trucks usually run on gas with a fuel injection system. They are not carbureted and the design includes a full roll cage and safety features. Mini monster trucks perform the same moves as standard monster trucks, including jumps, rolls, wheelies, and crushing standard vehicles.

== History ==
In 2009, the first mini monster truck was built for use in professional youth competitions with a child driver named Kid KJ, who was billed as the World's Youngest Monster Truck Driver. The truck was a Monster Bear, a 1/3rd scale replica of a monster truck. He drives in a professional mini monster truck, called Monster Bear, which was built strictly to replicate a full-size monster truck.

Monster Jam also uses a type of monster truck, called a Speedster, which is referred to as a “mini” and designed for faster competitions. The speedster can achieve faster speeds, up to 47 mph, and is typically driven by an adult in either a Chicago style roundy-round or an obstacle course.

== Professional racing ==
Professional mini monster truck racing is a youth sport that began receiving nationwide recognition in 2009. Kaid Jaret Olson-Weston, also known as Kid KJ, holds the world record for the youngest professional monster truck driver. Kid KJ performed in a mini monster truck at age 6. The truck was Monster Bear, a ½ scale monster truck based on a 2009 Ford Super Duty. Monster Bear is the earliest competitive mini monster truck built for youth competitions. Monster Bear is 11 feet long, 78 inches tall, 8 feet wide, and weighs 4,000 lbs. The truck has tires that are 42 inches tall and is powered by a Ford Focus 2-liter fuel injected motor. It was later modified using larger axles and 46 inch tires, and the motor was changed to a 300-horsepower, 3800 Grand National Supercharged, fuel-injected motor. As the popularity of Kid KJ increased, there were 8 more builds for what became known as Team Kid KJ. More mini monster trucks were built and began performing and racing throughout the United States. Other trucks were Sir Crush A Lot, driven by Jake Olson-Weston in 2011, then 5 ½ years old, Demolition Diva, driven by Morgan Matheny, then 9 years old, and Lil Bully, driven by Chris Dixon, then 13 years old.

== Speedsters ==
Monster Jam's speedsters are utv's that are used in different competitions than standard monster truck competitions. The vehicles can be switched from two-wheel drive to four-wheel drive. They are more agile than a standard monster truck, and have more horsepower than a youth competition mini monster truck.

== Technical aspects ==
=== Design ===
Mini monster trucks are meant to be identical to standard monster trucks at a smaller scale, usually ½ or 1/3 scale. A mini monster truck is typically a four-wheeled vehicle built on a tubular chassis, which allows the trucks to have a wider range of flex than a standard truck. A mini monster truck has four wheel steering and four wheel drive to navigate challenging off-road courses and crush objects. The mini monster truck is not a modified truck, but it is designed and built from the ground up just like a full sized monster truck. One distinction between a mini monster truck and a standard monster truck is special features, which are built in to allow for an adult to move it around when child drivers are not available. There is an electric or hydraulic body lift for the fiberglass body, which is replaceable. Mini monster trucks roll and crash in the same way as standard monster trucks, and most damage is sustained by the fiberglass body, so it must be easily replaced. Mini monster trucks usually run on gas with a fuel injection system.

=== Safety ===
Mini monster trucks are not carbureted and the design includes a full roll cage and safety features. As most mini monster trucks are custom built, not all have the same safety features. When based on a go-kart or ATV chassis, safety features vary. Professional mini monster trucks are built with comparable safety features to those of standard monster trucks. In youth racing competitions, trucks are built with limiters, and will not go faster than 25 mph. Other standard safety requirements are fire suits, safety helmets, a radio-operated remote ignition interrupt system, and driver-to-crew radio systems that keep the drivers in contact with adults at all times.

== See also ==
- Monster truck
- List of monster trucks
