= Yamaha YZ85 =

Racing motorcycle

The Yamaha YZ85 is a motorcycle designed specifically for off-road and motocross racing. It is powered by an 84.7 cc single-cylinder, water-cooled, two-stroke, reed valve inducted engine and uses a 6-speed, constant-mesh, manual gearbox; with a multi-plate, wet-clutch. There are two wheel options – large wheel, with a 19-inch front and 16-inch rear; and small wheel, with a 17-inch front and 14-inch rear. It weighs 157 lbs (wet).
