= Mud bogging =

Off-road motorsport

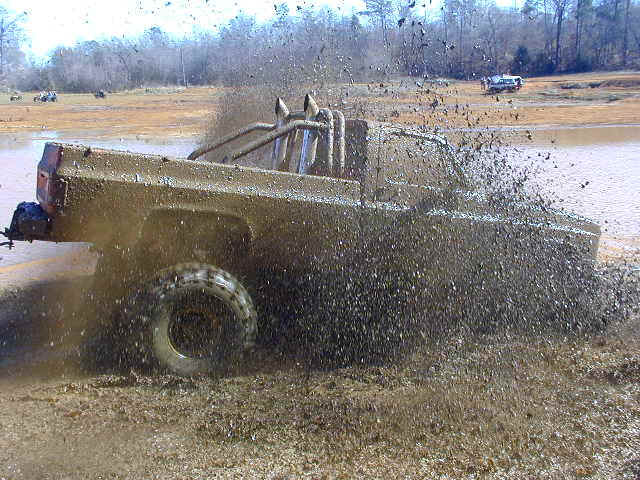
An example of mud bogging

Mud bogging (also known as mud racing, mud running, mud hogging, mud drags, mud dogging, or mudding) is a form of off-road motorsport popular in the United States and Canada in which the goal is to drive a vehicle through a pit of mud or a track of a set length. Winners are determined by the distance traveled through the pit. However, if several vehicles are able to travel the entire length, the time taken to traverse the pit will determine the winner. Typically, vehicles competing in mud bogs are four-wheel drive. The motor sport is overseen by sanctioning bodies like the American Mud Racers Association, and the National Mud Racing Organization (NMRO), that oversee each class, develop and maintain the relationship with track owners to provide a racer and fan-friendly facility, ensure the sponsors get a good return, and help govern the sport.

== Vehicles ==
A modern top level Class V or VI mud racer is a dragster-style rail design, with a supercharged engine and/or nitrous oxide injection. Engines may be in the front or the rear of the vehicles. Vehicles are required to have four wheel drive, in order to assure that the vehicles have the best possibility of avoiding being stuck. The sole difference between Classes V and VI is the tire type. Class V racers have US Department of Transportation street legal mudding tires for traction. Class VI vehicles have tractor tires.

Early mud boggers were pickup trucks or sport utility vehicles modified with lifted suspensions and larger tires, and classes exist for such vehicles today. Engine upgrades were also common. In the late 1970s and early 1980s, large tractor tires became popular, and the drive lines required to run such tires led to some of the first purpose-built mud bogging machines. By the late 1980s, many sanctioning bodies began giving precedence to vehicles with modified, and lower, dragster-type "rail designs", as they had increased in popularity. At the same time, superchargers first became widely used, leading to the modern top-level racer.

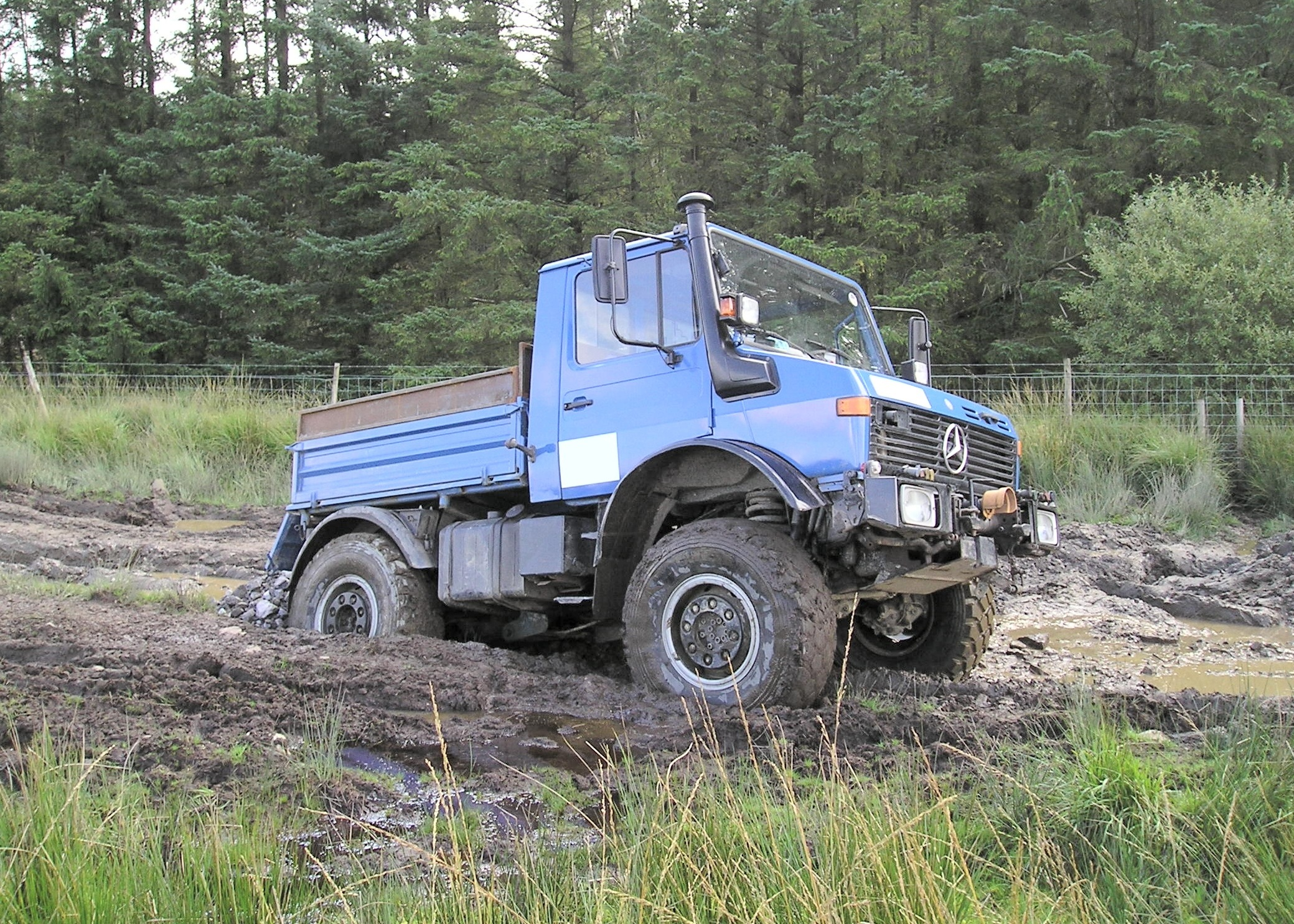
Mud bogging Unimog U1600

In the late 1970s and most 1980s mud bog events, there was generally a class that was for running tractor tired trucks. Trucks like the Arizona Outlaw, Goldbricker, Six Pack, Arizona Sidewinder, Instant Motion, Mud Lord, Mud Pup, Wild Thing, Grave Digger, Nasty Habits, Unnamed & Untammed, and the legendary Cyclops were frequent competitors. Some of these trucks would later be modified to be Monster Trucks.

There are many types of mud bogs, from Hill and Hole, Flat or Progressive Track, to Open Bog. They come in many shapes and sizes from 150 feet (46 m) to over 300 feet (91 m). Hill and Hole tracks are usually 60 feet (18 m) wide 200 feet (61 m) long, over a series of hills and holes. All NMRO tracks are Flat or Progressive tracks, more like a drag strip, or sand drag. Open bogs come from Florida and are mostly natural. These tracks have little organization.

Hill and Hole classes range from 4 and 6 Cylinder, Street Stock, Hot Street, Renegade, Super Street, Small Tire Modified 36″ and below, Big Tire Modified 37″ and bigger tire, Unlimited, X Class, and more. There are many classes, usually set by the tire size and engine.

Most Unlimited and X classes are open within the bounds of safety rules. These trucks have big power engines, built just for that class and are not limited to what can be added to the truck. The truck must pass all safety rules and be safe to put in a show and not hurt the crowd.

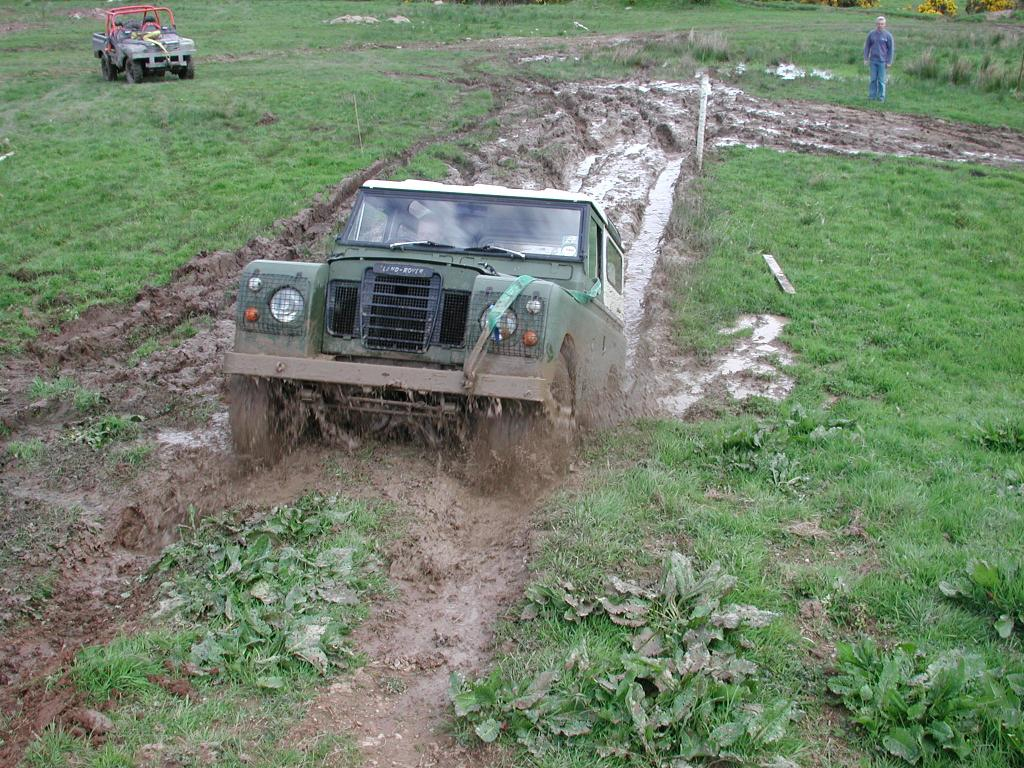
Land Rover Series III crawling out from a muddy hole

National Mud Racing Organization is currently one of the only major professional championship series left. Their rulebook is the general basis for most other mud racing competitions. The NMRO was founded by Gary Baker of Dayton, Ohio.

USA Motorsports and USHRA ran professional mud racing series, both referred to as the Indoor Series, for many years until it was phased out of events around 1995. They would occasionally have mud bogs as part of later events, but not on the same scale as before.

Years later around 2006 a new era of Mud Bogging started to evolve and has since grown into a worldwide internet sensation. Today, Mud Parks around the eastern half of the United States have events that draw in thousands of people who bring their Atvs, UTVs, buggies, lifted Jeeps, and Mega Trucks to participate in the act of Mud bogging. Most Mega Trucks are built with a custom chassis, have five-ton axles, upwards of 700 horsepower and have tractor tires. Some drivers enter their Mega Truck in freestyle, Hill'n Hole, bounty hole and Tug of War competitions and compete with others for cash and or trophies. Some Mega Trucks have a blower motor or an alcohol injected motor that will bring upwards of 1,500 horsepower. In order to make competitions fair the trucks can be divided into different classes such as Mega Truck Class, 1 Ton class and Super Truck Class.

== See also ==
- Motorized trail
- Off roading
- Swamp buggy
