= 2026 Popayán monster truck accident =

2026 vehicle accident in Popayán, Colombia

- Date: 3 May 2026
- Time: 17:20 (COT)
- Location: Bulevar Rose, Popayán, Cauca Department, Colombia
- Cause: Under investigation; mechanical failure suspected
- Deaths: 3
- Injuries: 38+

On 3 May 2026, a monster truck lost control during a stunt performance at a public exhibition in Popayán, Cauca Department, Colombia, and drove into a crowd of spectators. The crash killed three people, including two minors, and injured at least 38 others.

== Background ==
The accident took place during the "Popayán Monster Truck 2026" exhibition, held at the Bulevar Rose sector in northern Popayán. The event had been authorised by the municipal government despite being held at a venue not officially designated for events of that type. The permit set a maximum capacity of 1,000 people; however, approximately 1,500 spectators attended.

The show was organised by local entrepreneur Daniel Hernando Sandoval Urbano and featured vehicles operated by Colombian Monster SAS. It included monster truck performances, freestyle BMX, and motocross displays.

=== The driver ===
The vehicle involved, known as "La Dragona", was driven by Sonia Dilma Segura, a 52-year-old woman from Bogotá. She was associated with Colombian Monster SAS, alongside American driver Steven Hearley, who operated a second vehicle at the event. She had promoted the event on social media prior to the accident.

== Accident ==
Videos on social media showed the monster truck accelerating after clearing an obstacle, failing to brake, and veering off the track. The vehicle breached a barrier and struck several spectators before coming to a stop after hitting an electricity pole, causing power outages in the surrounding area. Witnesses reported panic among the crowd. Emergency services, including firefighters and medical teams, responded to the scene.

The injured were transported to hospitals and clinics in Popayán. Segura was among those injured and was taken to a medical centre for treatment.

== Casualties ==
The official toll confirmed by the municipality of Popayán was three people killed and at least 38 injured. The fatalities included two minors and an adult woman. Several other people remained in critical condition.

== Investigation ==
Authorities stated that the incident may have been caused by a mechanical failure but emphasised that the cause remained under investigation. Investigators examined whether the organisers and operating company met safety, insurance, and authorisation requirements.

Public scrutiny focused on the decision to authorise the event at the venue and on the adequacy of safety measures, particularly the barriers separating spectators from the performance area.

Mayor Juan Carlos Muñoz stated that a full investigation would be conducted.

== Reactions ==
Regional authorities expressed condolences to the victims' families and highlighted the emergency response. The mayor of Popayán visited injured victims in hospital and reiterated support for those affected.

== See also ==
- Monster truck accident (disambiguation)
