= Monster truck =

Entertainment vehicle with oversized tires

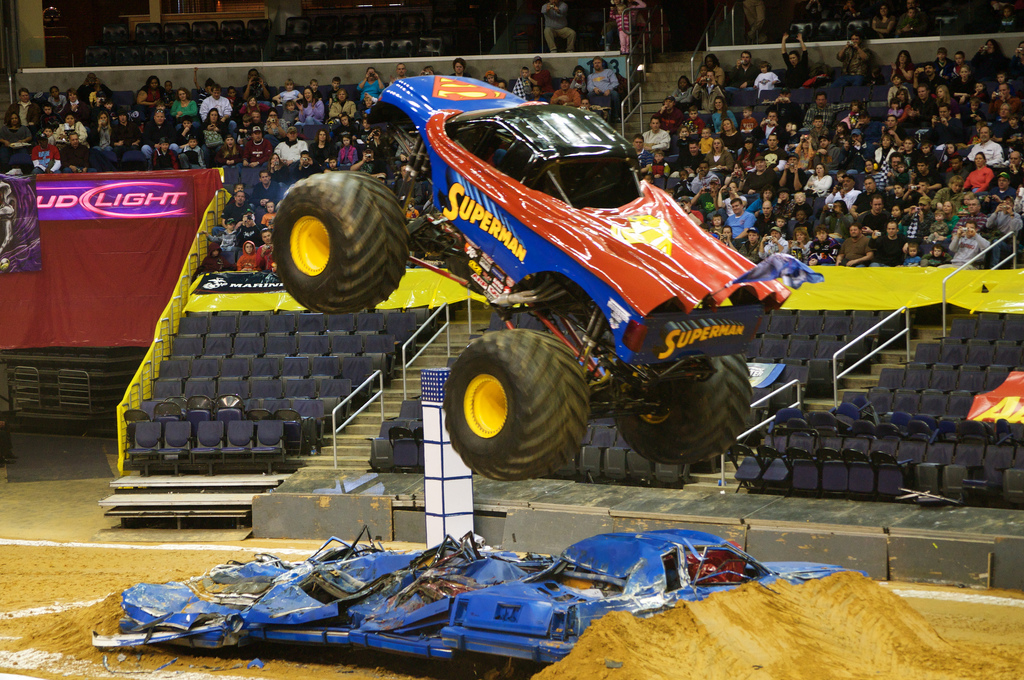
Superman monster truck

A monster truck is a specialized off-road vehicle with a heavy duty suspension, four-wheel steering, large-displacement V8 engines, and oversized tires constructed for motorsports and entertainment uses. Originally created by modifying stock pickup trucks and sport utility vehicles (SUVs), they have evolved into purpose-built vehicles with tube-frame chassis and fiberglass bodies. A competition monster truck is typically 12 feet (3.7 m) tall, equipped with 66-inch (1.7 m) off-road tires, and several tons in weight—those competing in Monster Jam events, for instance, must weigh at least five short tons, or 10,000 pounds (4,500 kg).

Monster trucks developed in the late 1970s and came into the public eye in the early 1980s as side acts at popular motocross, tractor pulling, and mud bogging events, where they were used in car-crushing demonstrations. Today they are usually the main attraction, with motocross, mud bogging, ATV racing, or demolition derbies as supporting events.

== Events ==
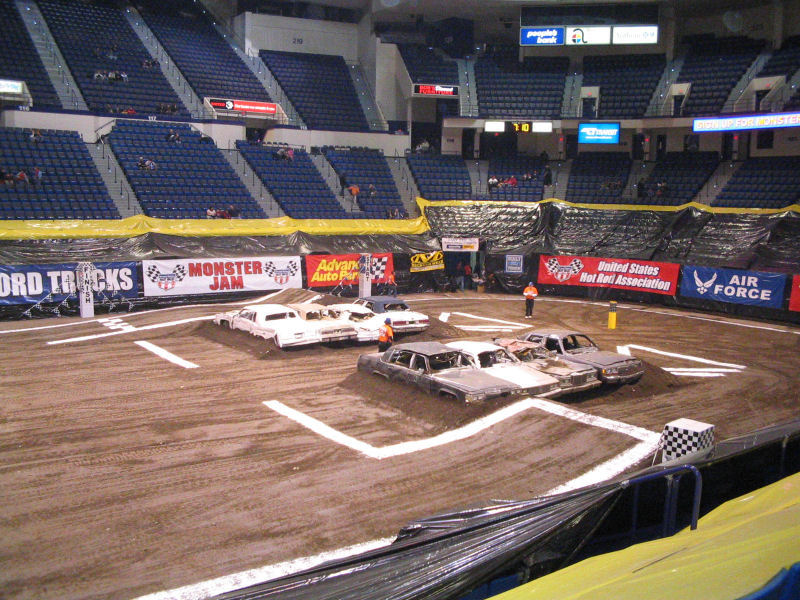
A typical track for arena monster truck shows from 2000-2014. The cars have ramps on one side for racing and are left bare on the other side for freestyle. The jumps around the perimeter are for ATV races.

Monster truck shows are generally held at stadiums, arenas, race tracks, and other permanent and temporary sports and entertainment venues. Monster truck shows may include trucks owned and operated by the promoter operating the show and/or independent monster truck teams who build and maintain their own trucks and act as a freelancer for multiple monster truck promotions. Generally the promoter of the event who operates and manages the show serves as a de-facto sports governing body which determines the rules and format of a show and its competitions.

Monster truck shows typically have two main segments: a race (which have been common since the 1980s) and a freestyle stunt driving competition (which have been common since the 2000s), with an intermission at the midway point of the event.

Races are conducted as a single-elimination tournament on short, symmetrical tracks, which may include obstacles such as junk cars or dirt mounds. The track's length and complexity may vary with the size of the venue. Courses in indoor arenas are typically shorter, with fewer obstacles. This has drawn comparisons to professional drag racing, and depending on the promoter or size of the event, tournaments may use a Christmas tree starting procedure.

In freestyle events, each driver puts on a performance consisting of stunts such as obstacle jumps, backflips, wheelies, and doughnuts. A panel of judges assigns points to each performance and the driver with the most points wins. The scoring methods can change from promoter to promoter.

Historically, additional vehicles for the drivers to crush, such as motor homes and school buses, were placed on the track specifically for the freestyle event, but incidents of debris flying into the stands and causing serious injuries have influenced most event promoters to turn away from such obstacles. Most freestyle courses now consist mostly of large mounds and ramps erected to allow the trucks to perform large jumps and wheelies upon landing. Freestyle performances have a time limit and only one truck is allowed on the track at a time as a safety measure. Freestyle events are typically a show's final competition, as damage to the trucks can make them unable to race.

== History ==
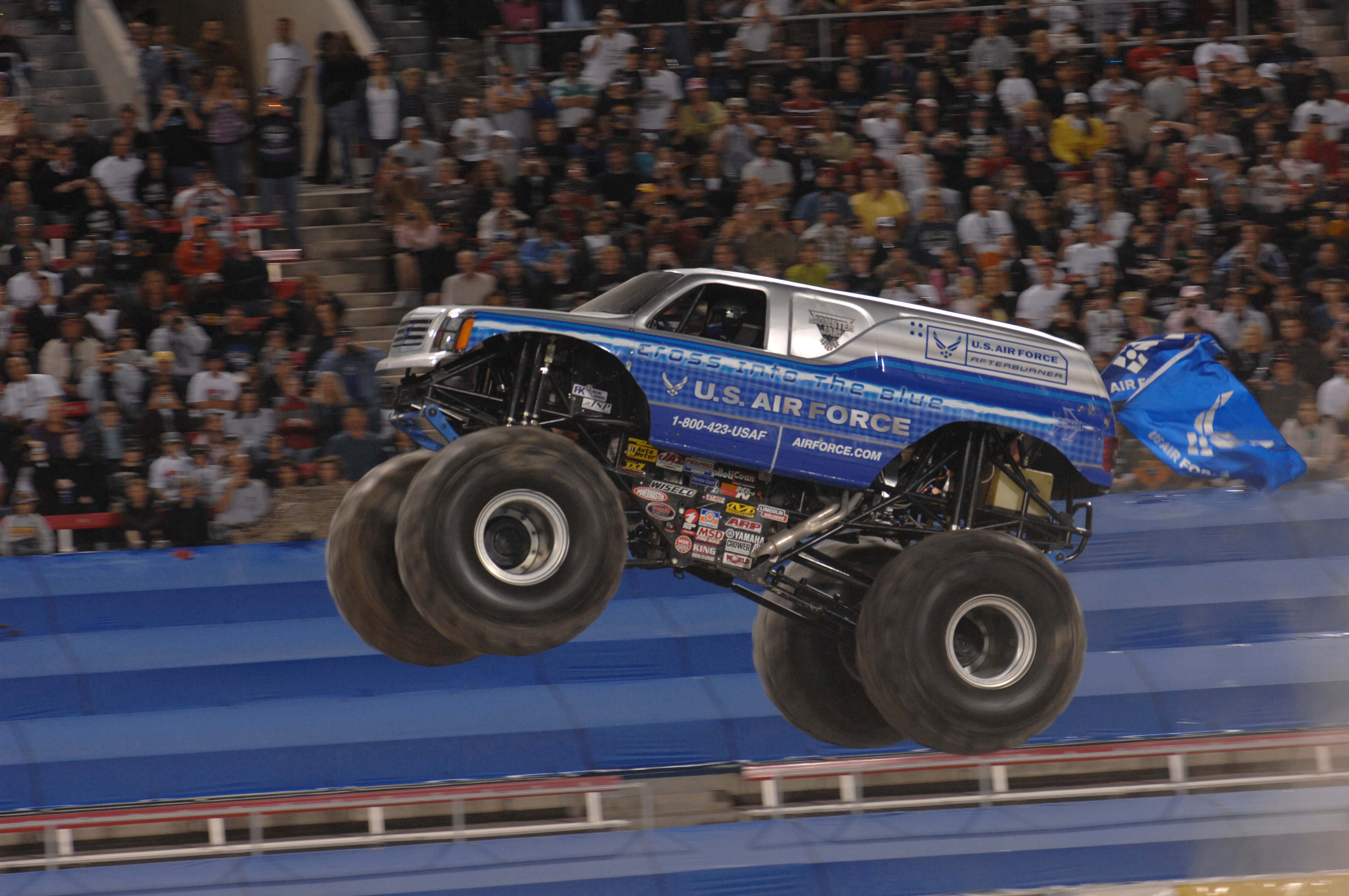
The U.S. Air Force-themed Afterburner performing at the Monster Jam World Finals in Las Vegas in March 2008

In the late 1970s, heavily modified pickup trucks were becoming popular and the sports of mud bogging and truck pulling were gaining in popularity. Several truck owners had created lifted trucks to compete in such events, and soon competition to hold the title of "biggest truck" developed. The trucks that got the most national attention were Bob Chandler's Bigfoot, Everett Jasmer's USA-1, Fred Shafer and Jack Willman Sr.'s Bear Foot, and Jeff Dane's King Kong. At the time, the largest tires the trucks were running were 48 inches (1.2 m) in diameter.

In April 1981, Chandler drove over junked cars in Bigfoot in what many believe to have been the first monster truck to crush cars. Chandler drove Bigfoot over a pair of cars in a field as a test of the truck's ability, and filmed it to use as a promotional tool in his four-wheel drive performance shop. An event promoter saw a video of the car crush and asked Chandler to do it in front of a crowd. Initially hesitant because of the "destructive" image that could be associated with Bigfoot, Chandler eventually agreed. After some smaller shows, he performed the feat in the Pontiac Silverdome in 1982. At this show, Chandler also debuted a new version of Bigfoot with 66-inch (170 cm) tires. At an event in the early 1980s, when Bigfoot was still running 48-inch (120 cm) tires, Bob George, one of the owners of a motorsport promotion company, Truck-a-rama—later known as the United States Hot Rod Association (USHRA)—is said to have coined the phrase "monster truck" when referring to Bigfoot. It became the generic name for all such trucks.

King Kong and Bear Foot each followed Bigfoot to 66-inch-diameter (1.7 m) tires, and soon other monster trucks, such as King Krunch, Maddog, and Virginia Giant were being constructed. These early trucks were built on stock chassis that were heavily reinforced and used leaf spring suspension, a stock body, and heavy axles from military-specification vehicles to support the tires.

For most of the early 1980s, monster trucks performed primarily as a side show to truck pulling or mud bogging events. In August 1983, Bigfoot and USA-1 competed in the first side-by-side monster truck race, which was filmed for the television show That's Incredible. By 1985 major promoters, such as the USHRA and TNT Motorsports, were racing monster trucks regularly. In 1988, TNT Motorsports created a series to establish the first monster truck racing championship; USA-1 and rookie driver Rod Litzau edged out Bigfoot, driven by Rich Hoosier, for the title.

In 1988, to standardize rules for truck construction and safety, Chandler, Braden, and George Carpenter formed the Monster Truck Racing Association (MTRA). The MTRA created standard safety rules to govern monster trucks. The organization still plays a major role in the sport's development in the US and EU.

With racing taking precedence, several teams began to think of new ways to build the trucks. Toward the end of 1988, Gary Cook and David Morris debuted Equalizer, a truck with a combination of coil springs and shock absorbers as the main source of suspension rather than the standard leaf springs and shock absorbers. In 1989, Jack Willman Sr., now with his own truck, Taurus, debuted a new truck that used a solid axle suspension system made of parallel four-link suspensions and coilovers that together weighed in at close to 9,000 pounds (4,100 kg). But the biggest innovation came from Chandler, also in 1989, when the CAD-designed Bigfoot #8 debuted, featuring a full tubular chassis and a long-travel suspension system made of triangulated four-link suspensions, bump stops, limit straps, cantilevers, and shock absorbers charged with nitrogen gas. The truck revolutionized how monster trucks were built, and within a few years most top-level teams built similar vehicles.

In 1991, the USHRA purchased TNT and their points series were merged. The Special Events championship began to grow in popularity with teams as it had open qualifying spots, which the invitation-only USHRA championship did not. The Special Events series lost its Pendaliner sponsorship in 1997. The short-lived ProMT series started in 2000.

Even though racing was dominant as a competition, USHRA events began having freestyle exhibitions as early as 1993. These exhibitions were developed as drivers, notably Dennis Anderson of the Grave Digger, began asking for time to come out and perform if they lost in early rounds of racing. Promoters began to notice the popularity of freestyle among fans, and in 2000 the USHRA began holding freestyle as a judged competition at events. It now awards a freestyle championship.

== Promoters ==
The USHRA's Monster Jam series, now owned by Feld Entertainment, is the largest, touring through the United States, Canada and parts of Europe. Other promoters of monster truck events include the Toughest Monster Truck Tour, the Monster X Tour, and Hot Wheels Monster Trucks Live.

== Truck construction ==
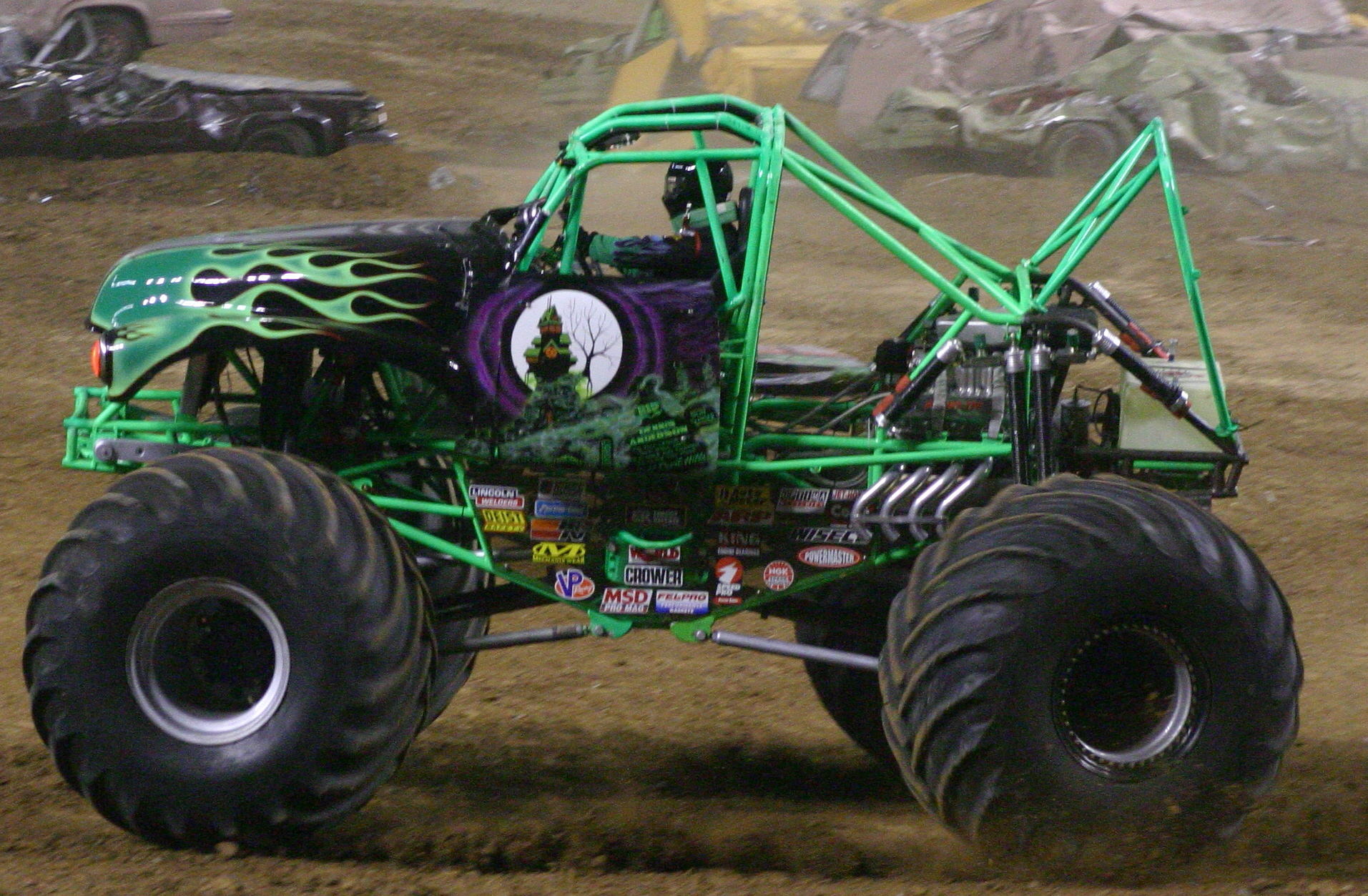
This image of Grave Digger, minus much of its body work, reveals how far removed monster truck designs are from those of the production pickup trucks they descend from.

The first monster trucks were pickup trucks and SUVs modified with larger suspension and larger tires. Today, trucks have custom built tubular chassis, with four-link suspension to provide up to four feet (1.2 m) of clearance, and fiberglass bodies that attach to the chassis separately and are designed to be easily removed and easily replaced. The use of fiberglass panel bodies has allowed monster truck owners to develop a wide variety of thematic concept trucks that scarcely resemble the early monster trucks.

Engines are now typically mounted behind the driver on most trucks and are typically supercharged, run on a methanol-based fuel, and have displacement of up to 575 cubic inches (9.42 L). Axles are taken mostly from either heavy-duty military trucks or road vehicles such as school buses, and are modified to have a planetary gear reduction at the hub to help turn the tires. All trucks have hydraulic steering in both the front and the rear (four wheel steering), with the front wheels controlled by the steering wheel and the rear wheels by a toggle switch.

The tires are typically "terra" tires used on farm equipment, and are 66-inch (170 cm) in diameter, 43-inch (110 cm) in width, and fit on 25-inch (64 cm) diameter rims.

Most trucks use a modified or custom-designed automatic transmission, such as a Turbo 400, Powerglide, Ford C6 transmission, or a TorqueFlite 727. Some trucks have a Lenco transmission, which traces its roots to drag racing. Most of the automatic transmissions are heavily modified with transbrakes, manual valve bodies, and heavy-duty gear sets. Trucks running a Lenco use a centrifugal clutch as opposed to a torque converter, which are used in automatic transmissions. Lenco transmissions are usually found in two- or three-speed configurations, and are commonly shifted using compressed carbon dioxide.

The trucks have many safety features, several of which are required just to run in the various sports venues that the trucks frequent. Trucks are generally equipped with three shutoff switches: a remote ignition interrupt (RII), which allows event stewards to stop a truck remotely, a switch within the driver's reach in the cab, and another at the rear of the truck so that all electrical power may be shut off in the event of a rollover.

Many trucks are constructed with the driver sitting in the center of the cab for visibility. Most cabs are shielded with Lexan or comparable polycarbonate, which not only protects the driver from track debris but allows for increased visibility. Drivers are required to wear firesuits, safety harnesses, helmets, and head and neck restraints. Most moving parts on the truck are also shielded, and high-pressure components have restraining straps, both in case of an explosion.

== Accidents ==
Below is a list of accidents resulting in fatalities.

On January 16, 2009, at a Monster Jam event in Tacoma, Washington, six-year-old Sebastian Hizey was fatally injured when he was struck by flying debris from the truck Natural High. Hizey succumbed to his injuries the next morning.

On January 25, 2009, the monster truck Samson was involved in an accident in Madison, Wisconsin, that caused the death of the announcer George Eisenhart, Jr. after he accidentally stepped in front of Samson while it was moving.

On October 6, 2013, the monster truck Big Show plowed into a crowd of spectators in Chihuahua City, Mexico, killing eight people and injuring 79 more in the Chihuahua monster truck accident. This is the deadliest monster truck incident in the history of the sport.

On September 28, 2014, in the Netherlands, a monster truck plowed into a crowd of spectators in the Haaksbergen monster truck accident, killing three people.

On May 4, 2026, in Popayán, Colombia, three spectators were killed and at least 38 were injured after a monster truck failed to brake and plowed into a crowd before crashing into a pole in the 2026 Popayán monster truck accident.

== Guinness World Records ==
The world's biggest monster truck is Bigfoot 5, built in 1986, with tires that measure 10 feet (3.0 m).

The world's longest monster truck is the Sin City Hustler, which measures 32 feet (9.8 m) long and was created by Brad and Jen Campbell in 2014.

The highest speed achieved by a monster truck is 101.84 miles per hour (163.90 km/h), by Joe Sylvester in Bad Habit on August 6, 2022.

The longest ramp jump by a monster truck was achieved in 2013 by Joey Sylvester in Bad Habit at 237.7 feet (72.5 m).

The first monster truck backflip in a scored competition was achieved in 2010 by Cam McQueen in Nitro Circus.

The first monster truck front flip in a scored competition was achieved in 2017 by Lee O'Donnell in VP Racing Fuels' Mad Scientist at Monster Jam World Finals 18.

In June 2020, with touring suspended due to the COVID-19 pandemic, Monster Jam staged an event for pay-per-view called Monster Jam Breaking World Records in Bradenton, Florida. As part of the event, many new Guinness-recognized world records were set. These include the highest ramp jump by a monster truck, by Krysten Anderson in Grave Digger at 10.3 metres (34 ft), the most monster trucks jumped by a monster truck, by Adam Anderson in Megalodon, at eight, the most donuts (spins) in a monster truck in one minute, by Bari Musawwir in Zombie, at 44, the most consecutive donuts (spins), also by Musawwir, at 58, the longest stoppie (nose wheelie) by Tom Meents in Max-D, at 63.77 metres (209.2 ft), the farthest bicycle (side wheelie) by Ryan Anderson in Son Uva Digger, at 271.83 metres (891.8 ft), and the longest monster truck wheelie, by Adam Anderson in Grave Digger, at 190.46 m (624 ft 10.44 in).

== See also ==
- List of monster trucks
- Mini monster truck
- Pickup truck racing
- Truck racing
- Trophy truck
