= Haaksbergen monster truck accident =

2014 crash of a truck into spectators

Haaksbergen monstertruck accident
- Location of Haaksbergen in Netherlands
- Date: 28 September 2014
- Location: Haaksbergen, Netherlands; 52.15792°N 6.73744°E
- Deaths: 3
- Injuries: 28

The Haaksbergen monster truck accident happened on 28 September 2014 in Haaksbergen, Netherlands, when a monster truck crashed into the attending crowd. Three visitors were reported dead, amongst them one child. According to Hans Gerritsen, the mayor of Haaksbergen, twelve people were injured.

== Accident ==
The Monster Truck Racing Association has stated that spectators were situated at event level and in close proximity to the performance area, separated by only bike rack barricades. It also stated that multiple layers of safety precaution, such as an on-board Remote Ignition Interrupter (RII) to allow event staff to instantly disable the vehicle, would have undoubtedly prevented the accident.

== See also ==
- 2014 in the Netherlands
