= Adam Anderson (monster truck driver) =

American monster truck driver (born 1985)

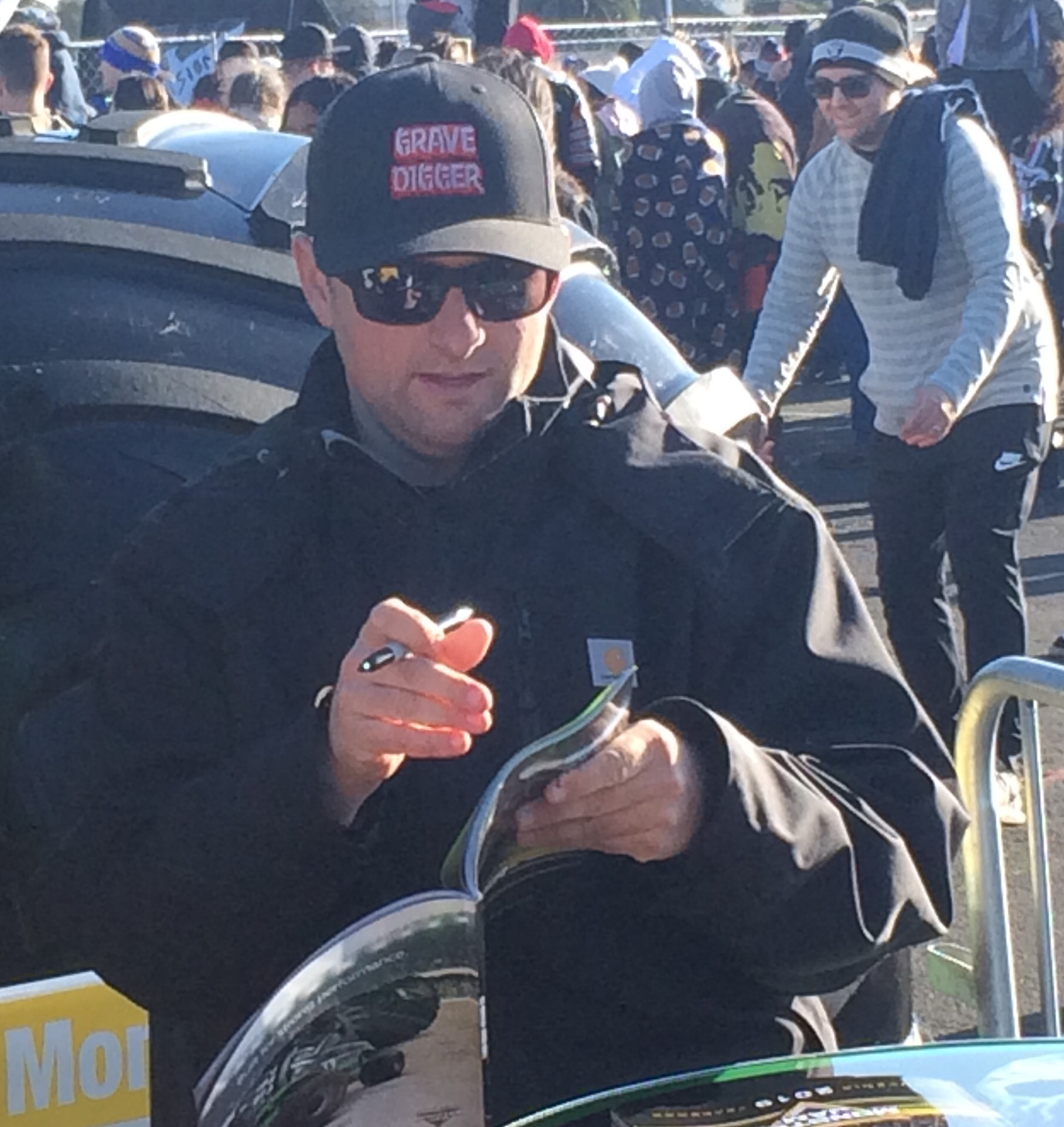
- Anderson in 2019

Personal information
- Born: December 5, 1985 (age 40) Norfolk, Virginia, U.S.
- Spouse: Brianne Anderson (m. 2011)
- Children: 2
- Parent: Dennis Anderson (father)
- Relatives: 2 brothers and 1 sister (including: Ryan and Krysten)

Sport
- Country: United States
- Sport: Monster Jam
- Team: Grave Digger

Achievements and titles
- World finals: Racing: 2013, 2014, 2018; Freestyle: 2008, 2016

Adam Anderson (born December 5, 1985) is an American professional monster truck driver. He currently drives Grave Digger on the Monster Jam circuit. Adam is the son of Grave Digger creator Dennis Anderson and the older brother of fellow drivers Ryan, Krysten and Weston Anderson. He is a 5-time Monster Jam World Champion. Adam currently resides in his hometown of Poplar Branch, North Carolina.

== Career ==
Anderson was introduced to monster trucks by his father Dennis Anderson, joining his father on tour when school was not in session from an early age.

He began driving competitively in Monster Jam in 2005, first driving Vette King, and later his own truck, Taz, a truck named after the Looney Tunes character.

In 2008, at Monster Jam World Finals 9 in Las Vegas, Anderson became the youngest Monster Jam World Champion at age 22, winning the "Freestyle" competition.

In 2009, at Monster Jam World Finals 10 in Las Vegas, Anderson was injured by hitting a tree at the Thunder Alley while racing against Alex Blackwell in Captain's Curse in Round 2, causing him to miss freestyle. Chad Tingler filled in for him in freestyle the following day.

In 2010, at Monster Jam World Finals 11 in Las Vegas, Anderson returned to freestyle after he suffered from an injury the previous year. In racing, he won in Round 2 against Scott Hartsock in Gunslinger, but he crashed after the race, causing him to not return to the next round. In freestyle, he rolled over for 10 seconds, causing him to earn the lowest score of 4, tying last with John Seasock in Batman and Jon Zimmer in Amsoil Shock Therapy.

In 2011, Anderson moved to Grave Digger the Legend, a truck modeled after an early form of his father's Grave Digger as a tribute.

In 2013, Anderson won his second Monster Jam World Finals championship in the racing portion driving Grave Digger the Legend in Monster Jam World Finals 14. He became only the fourth driver in history to win both a racing and freestyle championship at the Monster Jam World Finals. The other three were Tom Meents, his father in 2004, and Madusa. He won the championship again the next year.

In 2016, Anderson moved to Grave Digger, retiring The Legend design. He won the FS1 Championship Series, and also got his fourth world title and his second world freestyle title driving Grave Digger, scoring a 33 in freestyle.

In 2018, Anderson got his fifth world title and his third world racing title driving Grave Digger. His brother, named Ryan Anderson, became the sixth driver in history to win both a racing and freestyle championship at the Monster Jam World Finals.

In 2019, Anderson won the Stadium Championship Series 2 driving Grave Digger, getting an invite to the Monster Jam World Finals 20 in Orlando, Florida.

== Awards ==
- Monster Jam World Finals Racing Championships: 2013, 2014, 2018
- Monster Jam World Finals Freestyle Championships: 2008, 2016
- 2010 Monster Jam Save of the Year award
- 2011 Monster Jam Extreme Air of the Year Award
- 2014 Monster Jam Stadium Wheelie of the Year Award
- 2015 Monster Jam WOW Factor of the Year Award
- 2016 Fox Sports 1 Championship Series Champion
- 2019 Monster Jam Stadium Championship Series 2 Champion

== Personal life ==
Anderson is married and has two children: Wade Anderson and Luke Anderson.
