= Diesel Brothers =

- Genre: Reality
- Country of origin: United States
- Original language: English
- No. of seasons: 6
- No. of episodes: 49

Production
- Running time: 42 minutes

Original release
- Network: Discovery Channel
- Release: January 4, 2016 – December 28, 2022

Diesel Brothers is an American reality television series. The series premiered on January 4, 2016, on Discovery Channel. The program follows a group of friends in Utah who repair and customize pickup trucks.

Despite the name and physical resemblance to one another, the Diesel Brothers are not actually brothers. Friends David "Heavy D" Sparks and David "Diesel Dave" Kiley started a fix-it shop for all types of vehicles and brought in two other men as shop helpers. They posted various videos on YouTube, one of which led to an appearance on The Tonight Show With Jay Leno. Subsequently the Discovery Channel contacted the Diesel Brothers.

On November 15, 2019, the series was renewed for a sixth season which premiered on December 9, 2019.

On July 16, 2020, it was announced that a three-hour TV special titled Diesel Brothers: Monster Jam Breaking World Records would premiere on August 8, 2020.

== Lawsuit and arrest of Sparks ==
In 2016, a Utah advocacy group called Utah Physicians for a Healthy Environment filed a civil lawsuit against the Diesel Brothers, alleging they engaged in "significant, repeated and ongoing violations of federal law" by modifying vehicles to create black smoke from the exhaust systems, which the group characterizes as "one of the most toxic types of pollution there is". The physicians group bought a modified truck from Sparks Motors, and independent testing confirmed that without required emissions features, the truck produced 36 times the pollutants and 21 times the particulate matter compared to a stock truck.

In June 2018, after hearing testimony from an emissions inspector based in Davis County, Utah that a Diesel Brothers truck had been illegally modified, a judge issued an injunction prohibiting any similar modifications in the future. Sparks stated he was modifying trucks only for off-road use under the belief it was legal and was working with the Environmental Protection Agency to ensure compliance.

In March 2020, three of the Diesel Brothers (Sparks, Keaton Hoskins and Joshua Stuart) and their various companies were fined a total of $850,000 after Federal Judge Robert J. Shelby determined they had violated the Clean Air Act on hundreds of occasions and also had violated the earlier injunction. The fine was less than the maximum possible, as Judge Shelby recognized various mitigating factors.

The Diesel Brothers filed an appeal in April 2020, with their attorney arguing the case fell under a split circuit with contradictory Federal rulings. In March 2021, Sparks and Stuart were ordered to pay $928,602 in legal fees, on top of the $848,000 which they owed from previous penalty rulings, to the Utah Physicians for a Healthy Environment, over Clean Air Act-related pollution violations. In December 2021, the appeals court upheld the previous verdicts and noted "flagrant misconduct" by the Diesel Brothers, but also ordered Shelby to re-calculate the fine to eliminate penalties associated with trucks or components which were sold outside Utah.

As a result of show cause orders issued by Judge Shelby, Sparks and his 2021 lawsuit co-defendant, Joshua "Redbeard" Stuart, would each be found to have liability.

On October 2, 2025, an arrest warrant was issued for Sparks on a contempt of the order charge which had been initially issued against both him and his co-defendants on June 24, 2024. Sparks and his fellow co-defendants were also found to have not paid required fines. On October 7, 2025, Sparks was arrested by federal marshals on multiple federal court order-related contempt charges which resulted from his failure to pay $843,602.23 which he owed to the Utah Physicians for a Healthy Environment as a result of the 2021 lawsuit ruling. He was booked into the Salt Lake County jail in Salt Lake City. he has since been released.

== Episodes ==
=== Season 1 (2016) ===
| No. overall | No. in season | Title | Original release date | US viewers (millions) |
|---|---|---|---|---|
| 1 | 1 | "Free Willy's" | January 4, 2016 | N/A |
| 2 | 2 | "Tows Before Bros..." | January 11, 2016 | N/A |
| 3 | 3 | "Hell Camino" | January 18, 2016 | N/A |
| 4 | 4 | "Truck vs. Train" | January 25, 2016 | N/A |
| 5 | 5 | "The Hole-y Grail" | February 1, 2016 | N/A |
| 6 | 6 | "From Sweden With Love" | February 8, 2016 | N/A |
| 7 | 7 | "Abominable SnowRam" | February 15, 2016 | N/A |
| 8 | 8 | "Busting at the SEMA" | February 22, 2016 | N/A |

=== Season 2 (2017) ===
| No. overall | No. in season | Title | Original release date | US viewers (millions) |
|---|---|---|---|---|
| 9 | 1 | "Callout Fallout" | January 16, 2017 | N/A |
| 10 | 2 | "There Will Be Mud" | January 23, 2017 | N/A |
| 11 | 3 | "Feed the Beast-Mode" | January 30, 2017 | N/A |
| 12 | 4 | "Hummer Time" | February 6, 2017 | N/A |
| 13 | 5 | "Motors and Rotors" | February 13, 2017 | N/A |
| 14 | 6 | "Truck Norris" | February 20, 2017 | N/A |
| 15 | 7 | "Epic Fail of the Year" | February 27, 2017 | N/A |
| 16 | 8 | "Somersault" | March 6, 2017 | N/A |
| 17 | 9 | "Flippin' Diesel" | March 13, 2017 | N/A |
| 18 | 10 | "Good Bros and Goodbyes" | March 20, 2017 | N/A |
| 19 | 11 | "Full of Bull" | April 3, 2017 | N/A |

=== Season 3 (2017) ===
| No. overall | No. in season | Title | Original release date | US viewers (millions) |
|---|---|---|---|---|
| 20 | 1 | "Race Against the Machine" | September 4, 2017 | N/A |
| 21 | 2 | "3 Axles and a Baby" | September 11, 2017 | N/A |
| 22 | 3 | "Snow Job" | September 18, 2017 | N/A |
| 23 | 4 | "Clash of the Titan" | September 25, 2017 | N/A |
| 24 | 5 | "Wham, Bam, C10 Slam" | October 2, 2017 | N/A |
| 25 | 6 | "Thunder or Lightning" | October 9, 2017 | N/A |
| 26 | 7 | "Not So Easy Rider" | October 16, 2017 | N/A |
| 27 | 8 | "Bros to the Rescue!" | October 23, 2017 | N/A |
| 28 | 9 | "Hurricanes, Trucks and Snowmobiles" | October 30, 2017 | N/A |

=== Season 4 (2018) ===
| No. overall | No. in season | Title | Original release date | US viewers (millions) |
|---|---|---|---|---|
| 29 | 1 | "Big Bro Bus" | July 30, 2018 | N/A |
| 30 | 2 | "School Is in Session" | August 7, 2018 | N/A |
| 31 | 3 | "2 Wheel Drive" | August 13, 2018 | N/A |
| 32 | 4 | "Yo Soy Diesel" | August 20, 2018 | N/A |
| 33 | 5 | "Diesel Defender" | August 27, 2018 | N/A |
| 34 | 6 | "De-Ice Ice Baby" | September 3, 2018 | N/A |
| 35 | 7 | "Yes Way, Jose" | September 10, 2018 | N/A |
| 36 | 8 | "Tuff Truck Takedown" | September 17, 2018 | N/A |

=== Season 5 (2019) ===
| No. overall | No. in season | Title | Original release date | US viewers (millions) |
|---|---|---|---|---|
| 37 | 1 | "Soar Like a Diesel" | April 8, 2019 | N/A |
| 38 | 2 | "Diesel Dave is my Co-Pilot" | April 15, 2019 | N/A |
| 39 | 3 | "Now Departing: Diesel Air" | April 22, 2019 | N/A |
| 40 | 4 | "Raising Heli" | April 29, 2019 | N/A |
| 41 | 5 | "Failure to Launch" | May 6, 2019 | N/A |
| 42 | 6 | "When Trucks Fly" | May 13, 2019 | N/A |
| 43 | 7 | "Prepare for Liftoff" | May 20, 2019 | N/A |
| 44 | 8 | "Monster Jump Live" | May 27, 2019 | N/A |

=== Season 6 (2019) ===
| No. overall | No. in season | Title | Original release date | US viewers (millions) |
|---|---|---|---|---|
| 45 | 1 | "Diesel Brothers Vs. The World" | December 9, 2019 | N/A |
| 46 | 2 | "Blazer of Glory" | December 16, 2019 | N/A |
| 47 | 3 | "Don't Tread on Diesel" | December 23, 2019 | N/A |
| 48 | 4 | "Detroit Diesel Brothers" | January 6, 2020 | N/A |
| 49 | 5 | "Get Pitted" | January 6, 2020 | N/A |

=== Season 7 (2020) ===
| No. overall | No. in season | Title | Original release date | US viewers (millions) |
|---|---|---|---|---|
| 50 | 1 | "Diesel Nation Celebrates Memorial Day" | May 25, 2020 | N/A |
| 51 | 2 | "Diesel Nation vs. Zombie Apocalypse" | June 1, 2020 | N/A |
| 52 | 3 | "Diesel Nation: The Fast and the Famous" | June 8, 2020 | N/A |
| 53 | 4 | "Diesel Nation Redemption" | June 15, 2020 | N/A |
| 54 | 5 | "Back with a Kodiak" | June 22, 2020 | N/A |
| 56 | 6 | "A Kraken Kodiak" | June 29, 2020 | N/A |
| 57 | 7 | "Release the Kraken" | July 6, 2020 | N/A |
| 58 | 8 | "Tanks A Lot" | July 13, 2020 | N/A |
| 59 | 9 | "A Tank, an Eagle and a Brat" | July 20, 2020 | N/A |
| 60 | 10 | "Brat vs. Eagle" | July 27, 2020 | N/A |
