= Grave Digger (monster truck) =

Monster truck

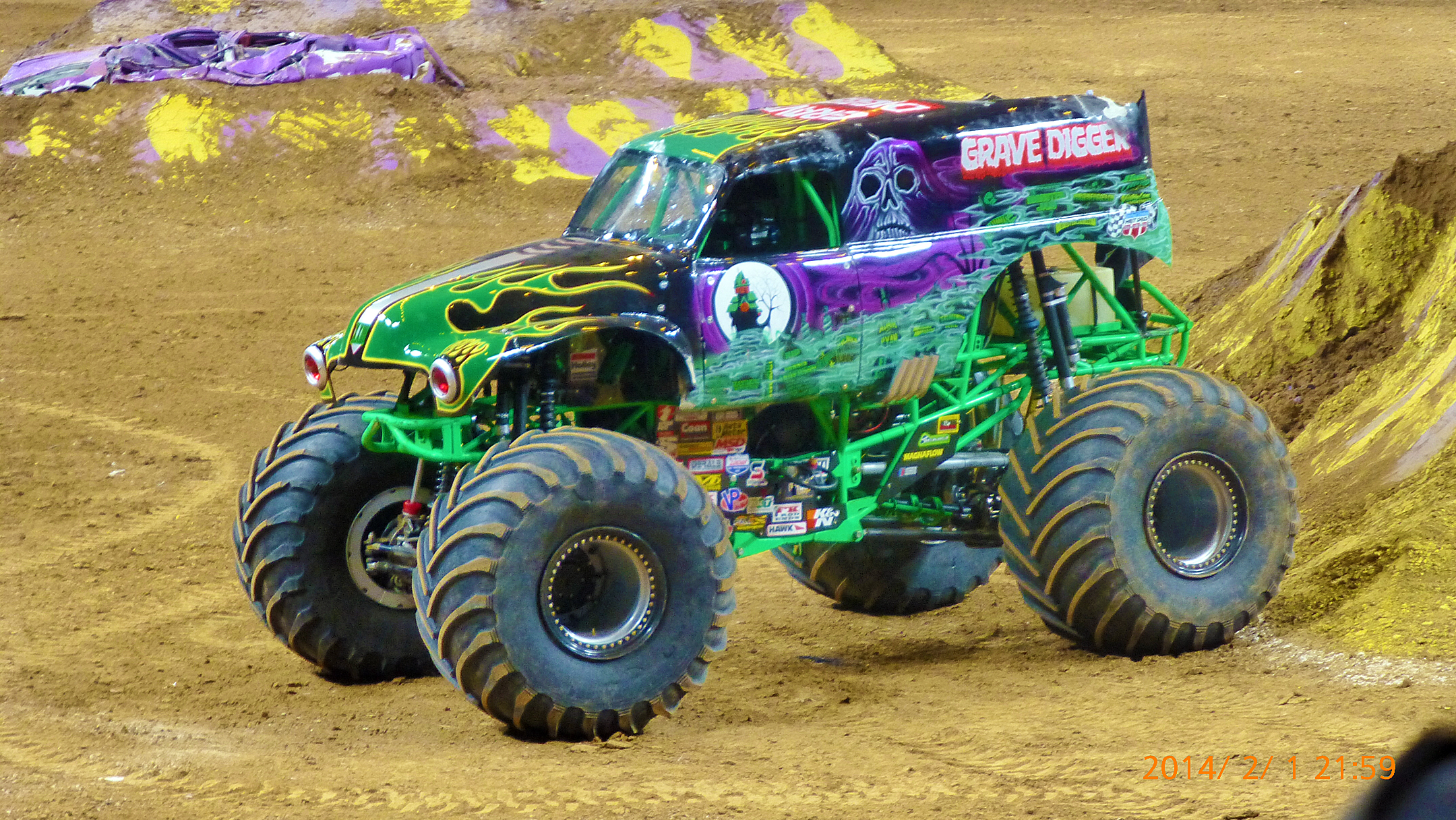
- Grave Digger #23, in 2014, Edward Jones Dome, St. Louis, Missouri

Owner and driver information
- Owner: Feld Entertainment
- Driver(s): Adam Anderson (Stadium Series East); Krysten Anderson (Freestyle Mania); Weston Anderson (Arena Series East); Tyler Menninga (Stadium Series West); Matt Cody (Arena Series Central); Charlie Pauken (international)
- Home city: Kill Devil Hills, North Carolina, U.S.

Truck information
- Year created: 1982
- No. built: 44
- Body style: 1950 [[FORD] Panel Van
- Chassis: Patrick Enterprises, Inc. (PEI), Cohen-designed ("in-house built"), Carroll Racing Development (CRD), and Racesource
- Engine: 540 cu in (8.8 L) Merlin 1,450 hp (1,080 kW)
- Transmission: Coan 2-speed transmission
- Tires: BKT/66" Terra

Grave Digger is a monster truck racing team in the Feld Entertainment Monster Jam series founded by original driver Dennis Anderson. Considered one of the most famous and recognized monster trucks of all time, Grave Digger serves as the flagship team of the Monster Jam series, with seven active Grave Digger trucks being driven by different drivers to allow a truck to appear at every Monster Jam event.

== History ==
Grave Digger was originally built in 1982 by Dennis Anderson as a mud bogger. This first truck was assembled from salvaged parts, including the body of a red 1952 Ford pickup truck. The truck received its name when Anderson, amicably retorting trash talking from his fellow racers about the truck's salvaged parts, said, "I'll take this old junk and dig you a grave with it." Anderson gained a reputation for an all-or-nothing driving style and quickly became popular at local events. At one show, a scheduled monster truck failed to show up and Anderson, who already had large tractor tires on the truck, offered to crush cars in the absence of the full-size monster. The promoter accepted and Grave Digger was an instant success as a car crusher and led Anderson to leave mud bogging and pursue monster trucks instead. In 1984 Anderson rebuilt the truck as a true monster truck using a 1951 Ford panel van body originally sporting a silver and blue paint scheme.

In 1986 Grave Digger first received its famous black graveyard paint scheme, and Anderson began racing monster trucks full-time. In 1987 and 1988 Anderson drove the truck primarily at TNT Motorsports races and became a crowd favorite for driving hard despite lacking major funding that better-known teams, like Bigfoot, had. In 1987, Anderson beat Bigfoot in Saint Paul, Minnesota and later won the racing event outright, on a show taped for ESPN. It was the first major victory for Grave Digger.

Anderson moved to Grave Digger 2 in 1989, with a new 1950 Chevy panel van body, while his brother Leslie Anderson drove Grave Digger 1. It was during this time that the reputation for wild passes was developed, and the popularity of the truck increased. It was also during this time that "Bad To The Bone" began to be used as the truck's theme song. TNT recognized his rising popularity and began promoting Grave Digger heavily, especially for races on the Tuff Trax syndicated television series. This was helped by Bigfoot not racing for points in the 1989 championship, leaving Grave Digger as the most popular truck on the tour.

When TNT became a part of the United States Hot Rod Association in 1991, Anderson began running on the USHRA tour and debuted his first four-link truck, Grave Digger 3. Throughout the 1990s, the popularity of the truck grew and forced Anderson to hire other drivers to run other Grave Digger trucks. Grave Diggers 4, 5 and 8 were built to suit this purpose, and were never driven in any major capacity by Anderson. Anderson drove Grave Digger 7, a direct successor to 3, for most of the decade. It was replaced by Grave Digger 12, well known as the "long wheelbase Digger", which was also the first Grave Digger with purple in the paint job.

In 1993, Dennis Anderson and Grave Digger #7 were heavily featured on the TV series Monster Wars. Anderson led the beginning of the season until breakages and disqualifications; he finished 5th. That year, Anderson won the 2nd USHRA wreck of the year title after he won and rolled over in Lebanon Valley Speedway, racing UFO. There was footage inside the cab of Anderson uttering his famous catch-saying “Yea we turned er over, she’s over, that’s what the people want, that’s what they got, I got a torn up truck!”

In late 1998, Anderson sold the Grave Digger team to Pace Motorsports (now Feld Entertainment) who owned the USHRA and Monster Jam tour at the time. Anderson continued to drive, being the most visible member of the team, and remained in charge of drivers and of training team members.

In 2014, Anderson became the second driver to attempt the LeDuc Leap, but he damaged the front axle of the truck and attempting to save it, thus ending his run early with a score of 8.5 in the World Finals at Sam Boyd Stadium in Las Vegas, Nevada.

Anderson competed in his final event on January 14, 2017 at Raymond James Stadium in Tampa, Florida. On September 18, 2017, Dennis announced his full retirement from Monster Jam, stating however that he would still be behind the scenes and in the pits. The truck has continued to run in Monster Jam since Dennis Anderson's retirement with the team as of 2026 consisting of three of Anderson's children and three other drivers.

== Accomplishments ==
- 1989 Semi Heavy Prelude Champion (Kyle Parker - Grave Digger #12
- 1991 Monster Jam A.R.E.N.A. Chmpion (Kyle Parker - Grave Digger #12)
- 1994 Monster Jam Row Races Champion (Steven Links - Grave Digger #12)
- 1999 Monster Jam Points Champion (Dennis Anderson – Grave Digger #12)
- 2000 Monster Jam World Freestyle Champion (Dennis Anderson – Grave Digger #7)
- 2002 Monster Jam Points Champion (Dennis Anderson – Grave Digger #14)
- 2003 Monster Jam Points Champion (Randy Brown – Grave Digger #18)
- 2004 Monster Jam Points Champion (Gary Porter – Grave Digger #12)
- 2004 Monster Jam World Racing Champion (Dennis Anderson – Grave Digger #19)
- 2004 World Monster Truck Racing League Championship (Gary Porter – Grave Digger #12)
- 2006 Monster Jam World Racing Champion (Dennis Anderson – Grave Digger #20)
- 2010 Monster Jam World Racing Champion (Dennis Anderson – Grave Digger #20)
- 2010 Monster Jam Points Champion (Dennis Anderson – Grave Digger #20)
- 2016 Monster Jam Amsoil Series East Champion (Cole Venard – Grave Digger #31)
- 2016 Monster Jam Amsoil Series West Champion (Morgan Kane – Grave Digger #25)
- 2016 Monster Jam FS1 Series Champion (Adam Anderson – Grave Digger #32)
- 2016 Monster Jam World Racing Champion (Morgan Kane – Grave Digger #25)
- 2016 Monster Jam World Freestyle Champion (Adam Anderson – Grave Digger #32)
- 2017 Monster Jam Triple Threat Series East Champion (Tyler Menninga – Grave Digger #23)
- 2017 Monster Jam Triple Threat Series West Champion (Cole Venard – Grave Digger #31)
- 2017 Monster Jam Stadium Tour Champion (Charlie Pauken – Grave Digger #27)
- 2017 Monster Jam Arena Tour Champion (Pablo Huffaker – Grave Digger #28)
- 2017 Monster Jam Arena Tour Champion (Randy Brown – Grave Digger #29)
- 2018 Monster Jam Stadium Championship Series 2 Champion (Charlie Pauken – Grave Digger #27)
- 2018 Monster Jam Stadium Championship Series 3 Champion (Morgan Kane – Grave Digger #33)
- 2018 Monster Jam Triple Threat Series Central Champion (Tyler Menninga – Grave Digger #32)
- 2018 Monster Jam World Racing Champion (Adam Anderson – Grave Digger #35)
- 2019 Monster Jam Triple Threat Series West Champion (Tyler Menninga – Grave Digger #36)
- 2019 Monster Jam Triple Threat Series Central Champion (Brandon Vinson – Grave Digger #31)
- 2019 Monster Jam Stadium Championship Series 2 Champion (Adam Anderson – Grave Digger #35)
- 2019 Monster Jam Arena Championship Series Champion (Randy Brown – Grave Digger #39)
- 2020 Monster Jam Stadium Series Yellow Champion (Charlie Pauken – Grave Digger #27)
- 2020 Monster Jam Triple Threat Series East Champion (Tyler Menninga – Grave Digger #36)
- 2020 Monster Jam Triple Threat Series West Champion (Brandon Vinson – Grave Digger #31)
- 2020 Monster Jam Arena Championship Series Champion (Randy Brown – Grave Digger #39)
- 2022 Monster Jam Arena Championship Series Central Champion (Krysten Anderson - Grave Digger #41)
- 2022 Monster Jam Arena Championship Series East Champion (Weston Anderson - Grave Digger #37)
- 2022 Monster Jam Arena Championship Series West Champion (Brandon Vinson - Grave Digger #36)
- 2023 Monster Jam Stadium Series Blue Champion (Tyler Menninga - Grave Digger #39)
- 2023 Monster Jam Stadium Series Red Champion (Adam Anderson - Grave Digger #35)
- 2024 Monster Jam World Finals XXIII Freestyle Champion (Tyler Menninga - Grave Digger #39)
- 2025 Monster Jam World Finals XXIV LCQ co-champion (Matt Cody - Grave Digger #38(Stars and Stripes), jointed with Cole Venard - Black Pearl)
- 2026 Monster Jam World Finals XXV JCB Racing Champion (Tyler Menninga – Grave Digger #44)

== Trucks ==
There have been a total of 45 Grave Digger monster trucks built. There are five trucks currently competing.

- Grave Digger #1 – The original truck was first built as a mud racing truck from a 1951 Ford pickup, then rebuilt as a true monster truck in 1985 using a 1951 Ford panel van body. The rebuilt version, nicknamed "Grandma", is on display at the Digger's Dungeon shop. A replica of the original configuration using parts saved from the rebuild was assembled to make an appearance at World Finals 8 in 2007 as part of a 25th anniversary celebration of Grave Digger. It is also on display at Digger's Dungeon.
- Grave Digger #2 – Built in 1989 from a 1950 Chevrolet panel van, which became the model for all subsequent Grave Digger bodies. The steel body was soon replaced by a fiberglass replica. It was heavily damaged in a crash that snapped its frame in late 1990, and retired from full-time competition. In 1994, parts, including the original steel body, were used to construct a special truck to allow Dennis Anderson to perform a stunt where he drove across Currituck Sound for charity. Fully restored in 2016 by Adam Anderson using the original body, it is on display at Digger's Dungeon.
- Grave Digger #3 – Debuted in 1991. First truck to use a steel-tube-framed, four-link-suspension chassis. It was sold in late 1999. The truck is currently owned by Jimmy Durr and known as "Slag Hag".
- Grave Digger #4 – This truck was operated from 1991 to 1993 by Jack Koberna as part of a franchise agreement for West Coast events. It was built with a traditional frame and leaf-spring suspension chassis with a fiberglass body. After Koberna's franchise ended, Pablo Huffaker signed a similar deal, and used his second Jus' Show'N Off truck (a tube-framed truck built in 1991) with the body from #4. Huffaker drove it as Grave Digger from 1993 to 1995.
- Grave Digger #5 – Built in 1991 using a new frame with parts salvaged from #2, including the fiberglass replica body and leaf-spring suspension. It was only used until 1992, and it became a display truck. Parts were removed for the restoration of #2, and the frame was sold.
- Grave Digger #6 – Built in 1991 as the "Street Digger", a street-legal display truck. Parts were later used to build a mega truck that is now known as "Old Number Six".
- Grave Digger #7 – Debuted in 1992, extensively rebuilt in 1999, and retired in 2005. Currently on permanent display at Digger's Dungeon.
- Grave Digger #8 – Debuted in 1992, retired in 2005. Used as a display truck as part of Cedar Fair amusement parks' "Monster Jam Thunder Alley" experience in 2019.
- Grave Digger #9 – Built in 1994 as a ride truck, it was sold and is now the ride truck Extinguisher.
- Grave Digger #10 – Built in 1995 by Pablo Huffaker. Became Radical Rescue in 2001 before being retired in 2004.
- Grave Digger #11 – Built in 1996 as a ride truck. It was rebuilt in 2013 and currently runs as a Grave Digger ride truck.
- Grave Digger #12 – Debuted in 1996. Originally retired in 2010 as a Grave Digger after a crash in Wildwood, New Jersey, the truck was refurbished and ran as Grave Digger the Legend in 2011 as a backup truck before being finally retired that year.
- Grave Digger #13 – Skipped per superstitions regarding the number 13, but used as a nickname for Grave Digger #7 after its substantial rebuild.
- Grave Digger #14 – Debuted in 2001. Retired in 2010 following a crash in Philadelphia.
- Grave Digger #15 – Debuted 2001, retired in 2009. Currently on display at Digger's Dungeon.
- Grave Digger #16 – Built 2002 by Pablo Huffaker, retired in 2013.
- Grave Digger #17 – Pro Modified drag racer sponsored by the team. (The IHRA and USHRA were previously under the same ownership.) No longer racing.
- Grave Digger #18 – Debuted 2003, retired in 2013.
- Grave Digger #19 – Debuted 2004, retired in 2014.
- Grave Digger #20 – Debuted in late 2005, retired in 2013.
- Grave Digger #21 – Display truck. The truck is mounted in a trailer where fans can sit in the cab of the truck.
- Grave Digger #22 – Originally ran as the Batman monster truck from 2006 to 2008 before becoming Grave Digger #22. Retired in 2013.
- Grave Digger #23 – Debuted 2011, retired in 2017.
- Grave Digger #24 – Debuted 2011, retired in 2016.
- Grave Digger #25 – Debuted 2011, retired in 2016.
- Grave Digger #26 – Debuted 2013, retired in 2016.
- Grave Digger #27 – Debuted 2014, retired in 2018.
- Grave Digger #28 – Built by Pablo Huffaker in 2014. Retired from competition in May 2018 when Huffaker retired as a driver. Now a display truck. Was featured in the music video "Miles on it" sung by Kane Brown and Marshmello.
- Grave Digger #29 – Debuted 2015. Retired after UAE shows in December 2024.
- Grave Digger #30 – Debuted 2014. Retired in 2018 when Dennis Anderson retired, as this was the last truck he personally drove.
- Grave Digger #31 – Debuted 2016. Retired in 2019
- Grave Digger #32 – Originally built in 2011 as "Grave Digger: The Legend", a retro-themed truck driven by Adam Anderson through the 2015 season, it was renamed and numbered in 2016 when Adam Anderson joined the Grave Digger team full time. Retired in 2018.
- Grave Digger #33 – Debuted 2017. Driven by Morgan Kane until 2021. Was driven by Weston Anderson until its retirement in 2022 after a crash in Hampton, Virginia.
- Grave Digger #34 – Debuted 2017. Was driven by Krysten Anderson until 2021. Was retired after crash in Glendale, Arizona. It was repaired in 2022 and used at World Finals XXI for freestyle by Adam Anderson.
- Grave Digger #35 – Debuted 2017. Retired in 2024. The chassis has since been converted to Lucas Stabilizer for a Lucas Oil Museum display.
- Grave Digger #36 – Debuted 2018. Currently used for international events.
- Grave Digger #37 – Debuted 2018. Was retired after 2025 Hidalgo Texas shows.
- Grave Digger #38 – Debuted 2018. Driven by Matt Cody
- Grave Digger #39 – Debuted 2019. Retired in 2024.
- Grave Digger #40 – Built 2019 as a ride truck for Cedar Fair amusement parks' "Monster Jam Thunder Alley" experience.
- Grave Digger #41 – Debuted late 2019. Currently driven by Charlie Pauken.
- Grave Digger #42 - Debuted in late 2024. Currently driven by Adam Anderson
- Grave Digger #43 - Debuted in 2025. Currently driven by Krysten Anderson.
- Grave Digger #44 - Debuted in 2025. Currently driven by Tyler Menninga.
- Grave Digger #45 - Debuted October 2025. Currently driven by Weston Anderson.

== Hallmarks ==
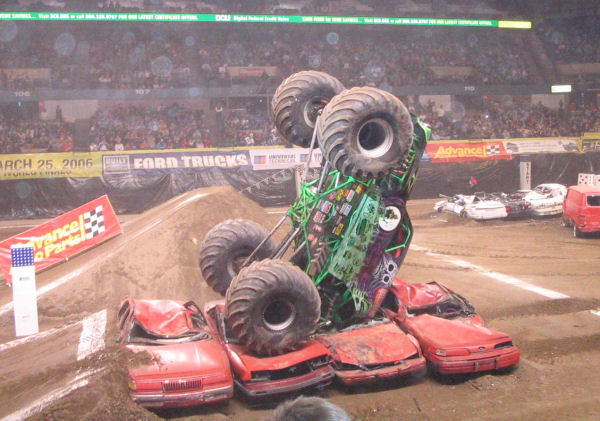
Grave Digger is well known for its damaging crashes.

Grave Digger's origins, the imagery associated with the truck, and the truck's wild reputation, are all considered part of the mystique of the truck and have contributed to its continued popularity. The paint scheme, which combines green flames, letters dripping blood, a foggy graveyard scene with tombstones bearing names of competitors, a haunted house silhouetted by a full moon, and a giant skull-shaped ghost, has not strayed far from the first incarnation of the paintwork from 1986.

Perhaps the most visible trademark is the red headlights which glow menacingly whenever the truck is in competition. The lights were first used when Anderson was building a transporter out of a school bus and removed the red stop lights. After realizing they would fit in the headlights of the van, he installed them and the truck has had them ever since.

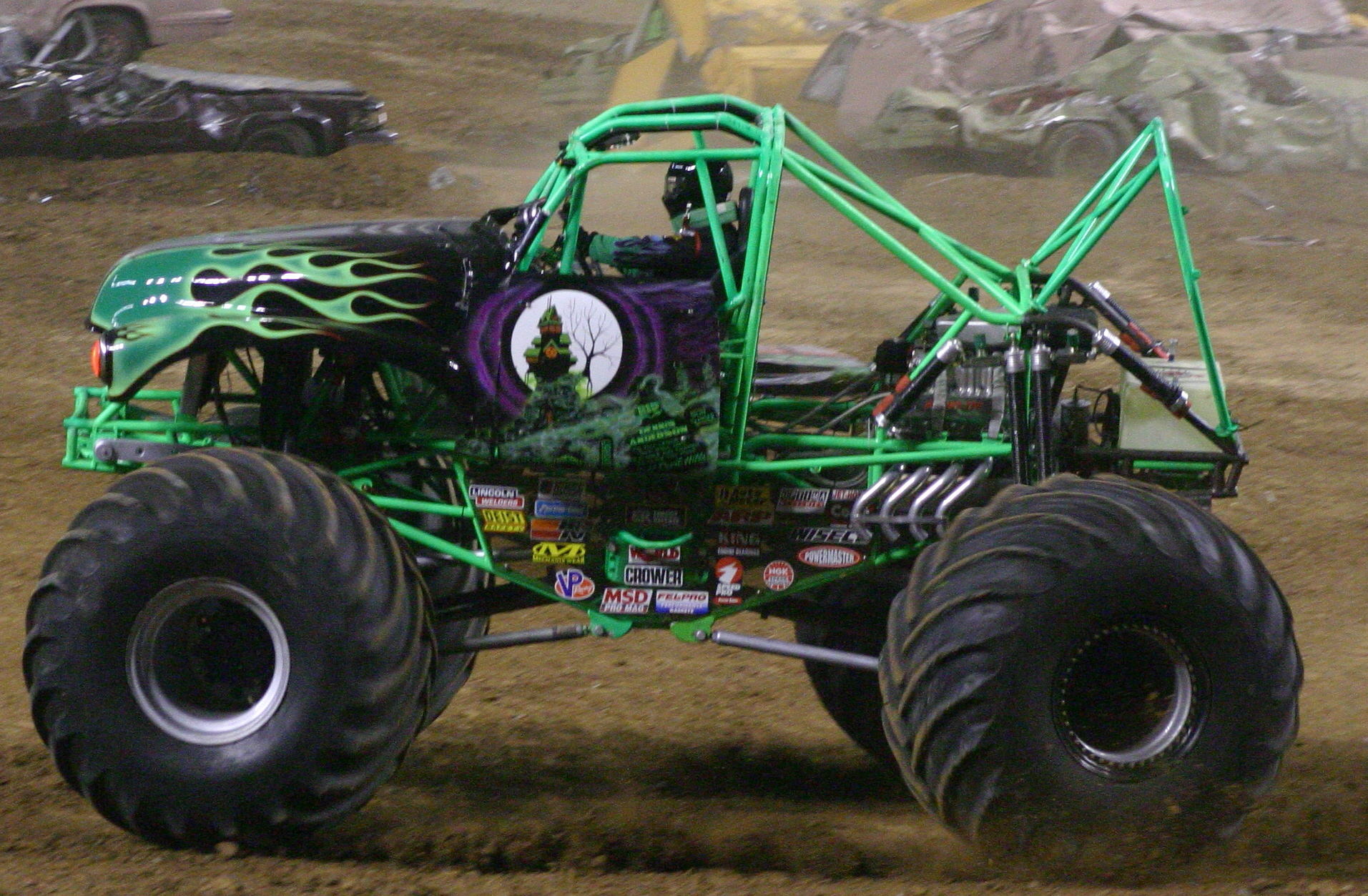
Grave Digger 7 with most of its body missing.

Anderson became known for destructive qualifying passes which entertained the crowd but on many occasions put the truck out of competition for the rest of the event. With the advent of freestyle, Anderson gained a means by which he could entertain the crowd with wild stunts while also focusing on winning races. Today, Grave Digger, no matter which driver is appearing, is traditionally the last truck to freestyle at most events, providing the "grand finale" which caps off the show.

The immense popularity of Grave Digger has made it the flagship truck of Monster Jam, and in some cases monster trucks in general. There is much debate over whether Grave Digger has taken over the title of "Most Popular Monster Truck" from Bigfoot. As a result, the Grave Digger vs. Bigfoot rivalry is one of the strongest in the sport, despite the fact that the teams have not raced each other regularly since the late 1990s.

== Drivers ==
=== Current drivers ===
- Adam Anderson – Currently driving Grave Digger #42 (2016–present)
- Krysten Anderson – Currently driving Grave Digger #43 (2017–present)
- Weston Anderson – Currently driving Grave Digger #45 (2022–present)
- Tyler Menninga – Currently driving Grave Digger #44 (2017–present)
- Matt Cody – Currently driving Grave Digger #38 (2023–present)
- Charlie Pauken - Currently Driving Grave Digger #41 (1998-2020, 2025–present)

== Digger's Dungeon ==
Digger’s Dungeon located in Poplar Branch, North Carolina, is the official home of Grave Digger. Besides the usual gift shop, there are several Grave Diggers located outside on display, including Grave Digger 1. There are also various pieces of other Grave Diggers hanging throughout the store, all of which have been damaged from various accidents.

Digger’s Dungeon hosted the 2010 No Limit R/C Monster Truck World Finals, taking place from May 28 to May 30. The RC World Finals is the largest RC Monster Truck event in the world.

== See also ==
- List of monster trucks
