= 2Xtreme Racing =

Monster truck team

Bounty Hunter Scarlet Bandit Iron Outlaw
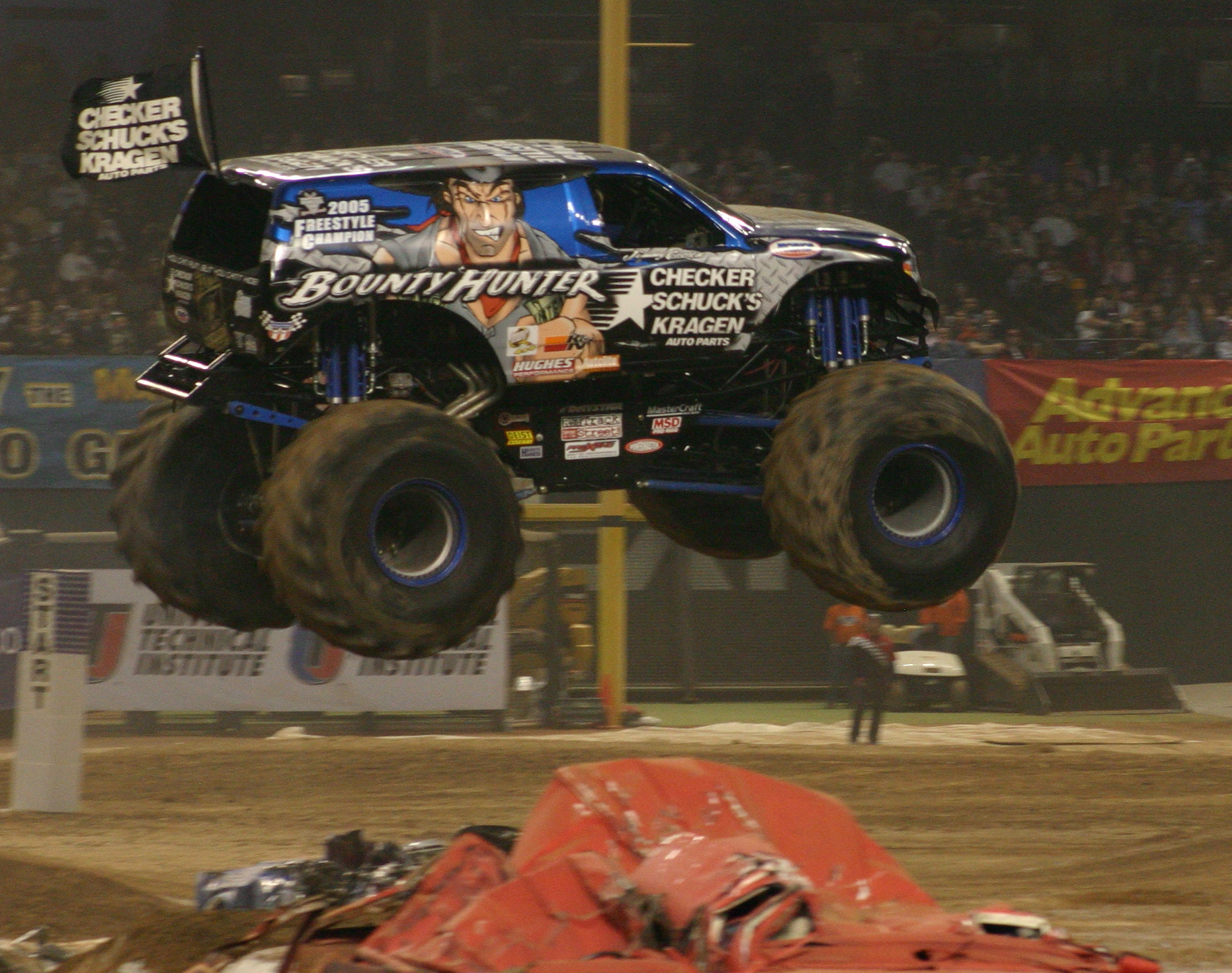
- Bounty Hunter racing in Arizona

Owner and driver information
- Owner: Jimmy & Dawn Creten
- Driver(s): Jimmy Creten, Dawn Creten, Mike Brister, Rob Poutre
- Home city: Tonganoxie, Kansas

Truck information
- Year created: Bounty Hunter: 1995; Scarlet Bandit: 2000; Iron Outlaw: 2005
- Body style: 2005 Ford Expedition
- Engine: 555 in^{3} Chevrolet
- Transmission: Hughes Performance 2 speed

2Xtreme Racing is a monster truck team consisting of the trucks Bounty Hunter, Scarlet Bandit and Iron Outlaw, all of which compete primarily on the USHRA Monster Jam circuit. The team is owned by Jimmy Creten, and includes Creten, his wife Dawn Creten, Trent Montgomery, and Todd Morey as drivers. Each truck features an old west theme with a character based on the truck's name. All three vehicles have competed in the Monster Jam World Finals, and Bounty Hunter was the 2005 World Finals Freestyle Champion and the 2019 World Finals Racing Champion. Jimmy Creten and Trent Montgomery currently drive the two Bounty Hunter trucks, Dawn Creten drives the Scarlet Bandit truck, and Todd Morey drives Iron Outlaw.

== History ==
After attending a show in the Kingdome in 1995, Creten bought the "Shark Attack" monster truck and renamed it Bounty Hunter without knowing a truck with the same name, owned by Brian Bellini, already existed. After several years with the truck, he added a second truck named "2Xtreme", which would be driven by his wife, Dawn. While Bounty Hunter had a Chevy S-10 body on a custom chassis, 2Xtreme was a Dodge Dakota on a Dan Patrick built chassis.

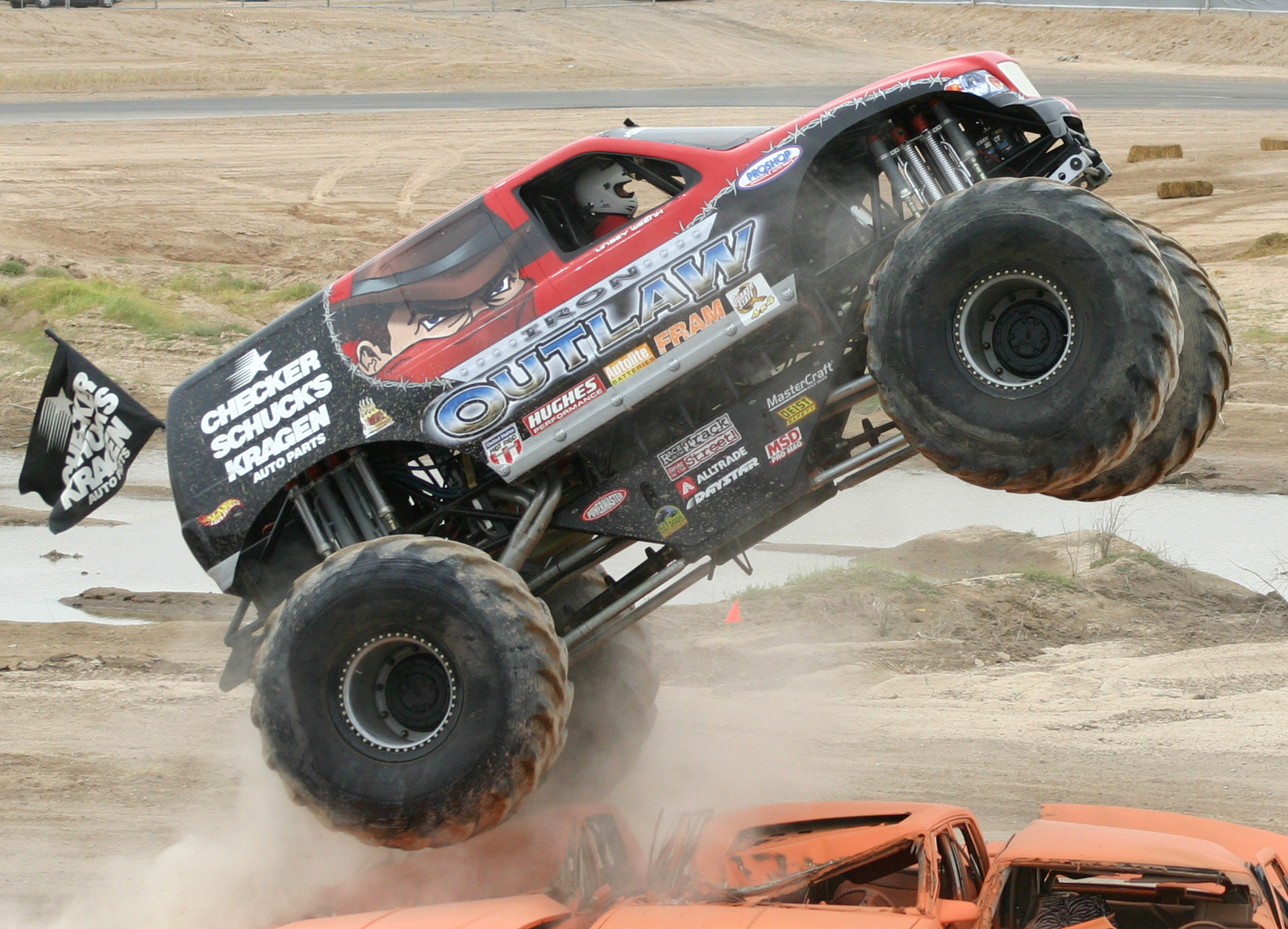
Iron Outlaw racing in Arizona

Through a series of displays for the company, CSK became an official sponsor of the team in 2000. It was then that 2Xtreme was renamed Scarlet Bandit. The sponsorship lead to a significant increase in performance for the team, and they began to be shown on the Monster Jam television show, notably with a final-round appearance by Jimmy in Bounty Hunter against Tom Meents in the Pontiac Silverdome.

For the 2002 season, both trucks were rebodied to Ford Expeditions, and were given new paint schemes with comic book character mascots. This was also the first year in which Bounty Hunter was invited to the World Finals, and was runner up in the racing segment. He also had runner-up finishes in the 2003, 2006, 2008 and 2011 events.

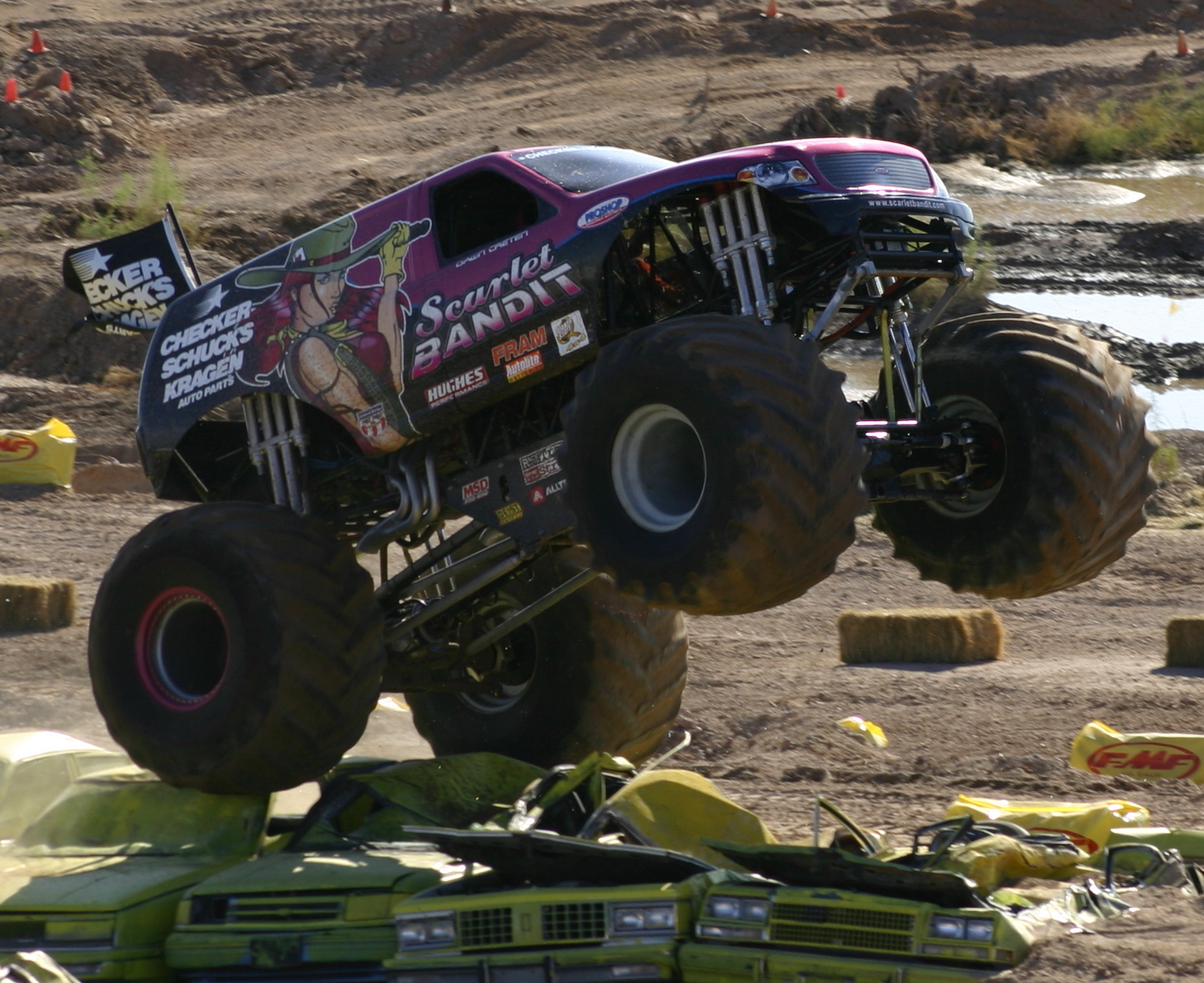
Scarlet Bandit racing in Arizona

For 2005, the new "Iron Outlaw" identity, driven by former Jurassic Attack driver Linsey Weenk, was added to the team as a replacement body for when Dawn could not attend events. This new look saw only limited action that season, but went full-time in 2006 when Dawn was expecting a child. After an unprecedented seven-event winning streak, the truck became a permanent team member. Also in 2005, Jimmy Creten won the World Freestyle Championship in Las Vegas, bolstering the team's reputation for freestyle as well as racing.

In 2007, all three trucks competed on the circuit and all earned a slot at the World Finals. In July, Weenk announced he was moving to the Blue Thunder truck at the end of the season. On October 23, former Dragon Slayer driver Kreg Christensen was named as the replacement.

During the prerace for the Samsung 500 NASCAR race at Texas in 2008, NASCAR driver Clint Bowyer and FOX analyst Jeff Hammond drove the Bounty Hunter truck (which was actually the Scarlet Bandit truck with a different body) for a feature segment of the show.

In 2010, at World Finals 11, Dawn Creten and Scarlet Bandit competed in the 10 truck freestyle encore.

In 2011, at World Finals 12, Creten lost to Tom Meents in Maximum Destruction in the final racing round, by about a truck length.

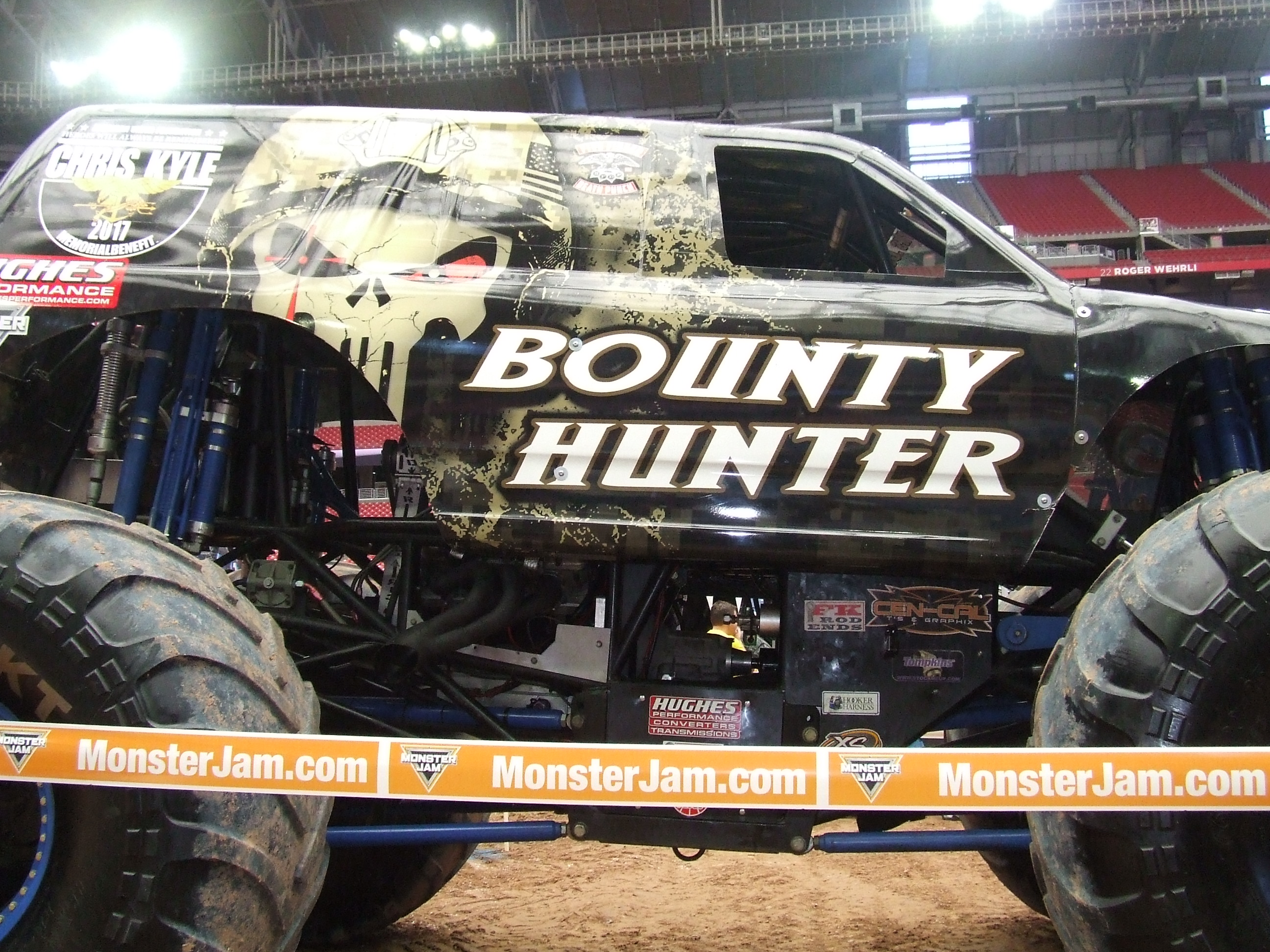
Chris Kyle Bounty Hunter in Glendale, AZ

Also, in 2011, the team took a hard hit, when Iron Outlaw driver Nick Owens died on August 13. His death was confirmed as a drowning. He was 30 years old and had just finished his rookie year and got rookie of the year in the seat of Iron Outlaw.

In 2012, at World Finals 13, Creten brought a special half blue and half transparent paint scheme. This was the first time Jimmy Creten changes the paint job for Bounty Hunter, which has since become a tradition at every World Finals to date, similar to Avenger, as well as completing his first backflip at the same show.

In 2013, at World Finals 14, Creten brought a special grey paint scheme. This version did not compete in freestyle due to a blown engine in Racing.

In 2015, Bounty Hunter celebrated its 20th anniversary. Creten brought a special half blue and half yellow paint scheme in the World Finals.

In 2016, at World Finals 17, Creten brought a special paint scheme, to pay homage to Chris Kyle. This paint scheme ran for the rest of the year.

In 2017, Scarlet Bandit and Bounty Hunter debuted a new paint scheme.

In 2018, Austin Minton brought a second Bounty Hunter. He and the truck competed in the Double Down Showdown. Creten also debuted a new Ramer chassis in the same year.

In 2019, Creten won the World Finals Racing Championship at World Finals 20 in Orlando, Florida. It's teammate truck, Scarlet Bandit, debuted a new paint scheme in the pit party at the same show.

== World Finals History ==
=== Appearances ===
- Bounty Hunter: 2002, 2003, 2004, 2005, 2006, 2007, 2008, 2009, 2010, 2011, 2012, 2013, 2014, 2015, 2016, 2017, 2018, and 2019.
- Scarlet Bandit: 2005, 2007, 2008, and 2010 (for the encore performance).
- Iron Outlaw: 2006, 2007, and 2008.

=== Racing ===
Bounty Hunter: Even though Jimmy Creten and Bounty Hunter have been in the Championship Race in 2002, 2003, 2006, 2008, 2011, and 2019, acquiring the World Finals Racing Championship. In 2002, 2003, 2004, 2005, 2006, 2008, and 2011, Bounty Hunter made it to the Semi-Finals, but spun out in Round 2 at World Finals VIII. Jimmy Creten has knocked over turning poles in 2005 and 2008, after crossing the line ahead of Grave Digger in 2005, and a little behind Batman in 2008. Jimmy Creten blew up his engine during Racing in 2013, causing him and the truck to not compete for freestyle.

Scarlet Bandit: Dawn has yet to make it past Round 2 in the racing. Losing in Round 1 in 2005, Round 2 in 2007, and in Round 1 in 2008. She qualified in the top 8 in 2007, and qualified 9th in 2008.

Iron Outlaw: When Linsey Weenk drove the truck in 2006 and 2007, he made it to Round 3 both times, but lost to Blacksmith in 2006 and Captain's Curse in 2007. When Kreg Christensen drove the truck in 2008, he lost to his teammate, Bounty Hunter, in Round 1.

=== Freestyle ===
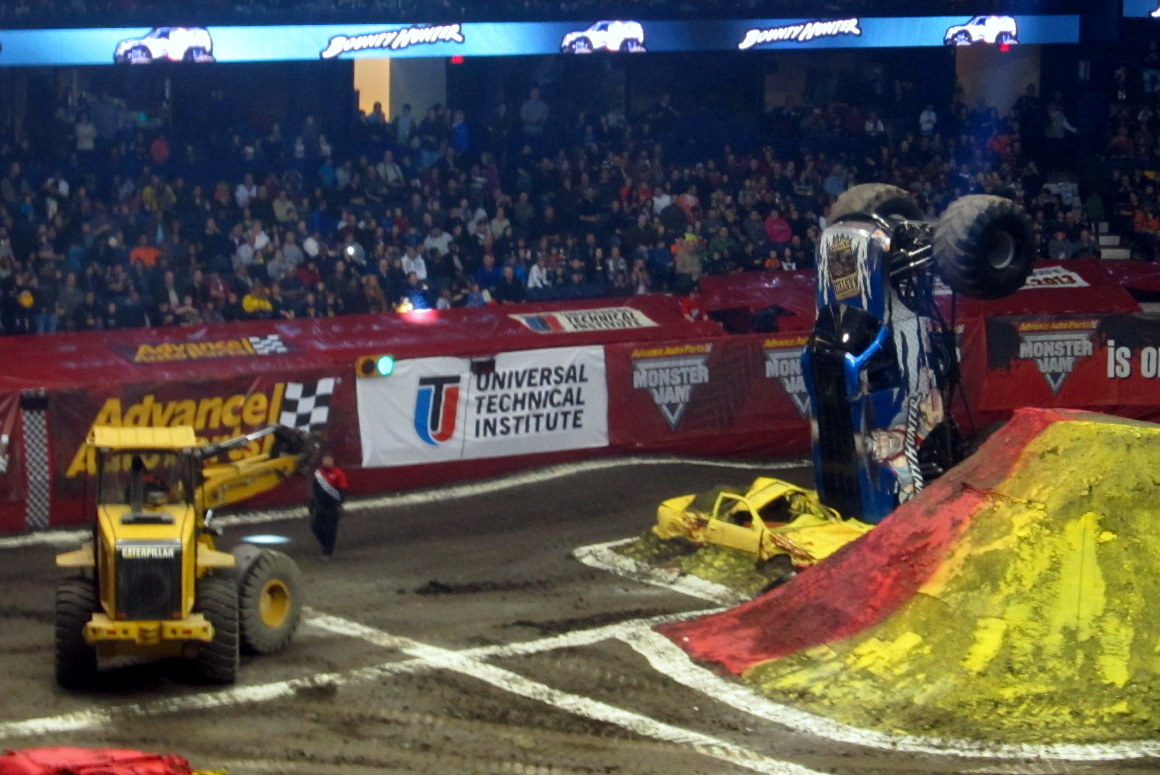
Bounty Hunter stuck in a vertical position after a freestyle jump

Bounty Hunter: Bounty Hunter won the 2005 Freestyle World Championship with a score of 31, but then it was changed to a 37 after tie-breakers with Tony Farrell and Blue Thunder. Then, Jimmy Creten has driven it to second place in 2009 and 2012. The truck has broken a back wheel off in 2006, 2008 and 2015, thus ending his run. He has broken down early in the run in 2003, 2007, 2016 and 2018. The truck did not compete for freestyle in 2013, due to a blown engine during Racing. He flipped the truck in the middle of the run in 2002, but had a spectacular finish on the trailer jump in 2004, then the truck got knocked off later by Debra Miceli in Madusa. He also did a 360-degree flip during bonus time in 2009, but landed on the roof, and going back to all 4 wheels, making it the WOW Factor of the night.

Scarlet Bandit: Scarlet Bandit usually comes out early or in the middle of the freestyle. In 2005, she got big air and scored a 25. In 2007, she got more big air and scored a 24. In 2008, she went for the triple bus jump and did the rollover of a lifetime and finished runner-up with a 36.

Iron Outlaw: The truck scored a 14, after losing a wheel in 2006. In 2007, the truck put on an awesome run coming out second in a field of 22 trucks in freestyle and scored a 29, finishing 3rd. in 2008, the truck broke the right-front spindle after the first hit and scored a 4, thus ending him up in The Doghouse.

== Awards and championships ==
- Bounty Hunter – 2003 Fastest Qualifier
- Bounty Hunter – 2005 Fastest Qualifier
- Bounty Hunter – 2005 Freestyle World Champion
- Bounty Hunter – 2007 Fastest Qualifier
- 2002 USHRA Team of the Year
- 2003 Special Recognition for Innovations in the Sport
- 2006 USHRA Team of the Year
- 2007 USHRA Team of the Year
- Bounty Hunter – 2019 Racing World Champion
- Dawn Creten - Scarlet Bandit, Longest Running Female Driver in the sport (1997 to Present)

== Images ==
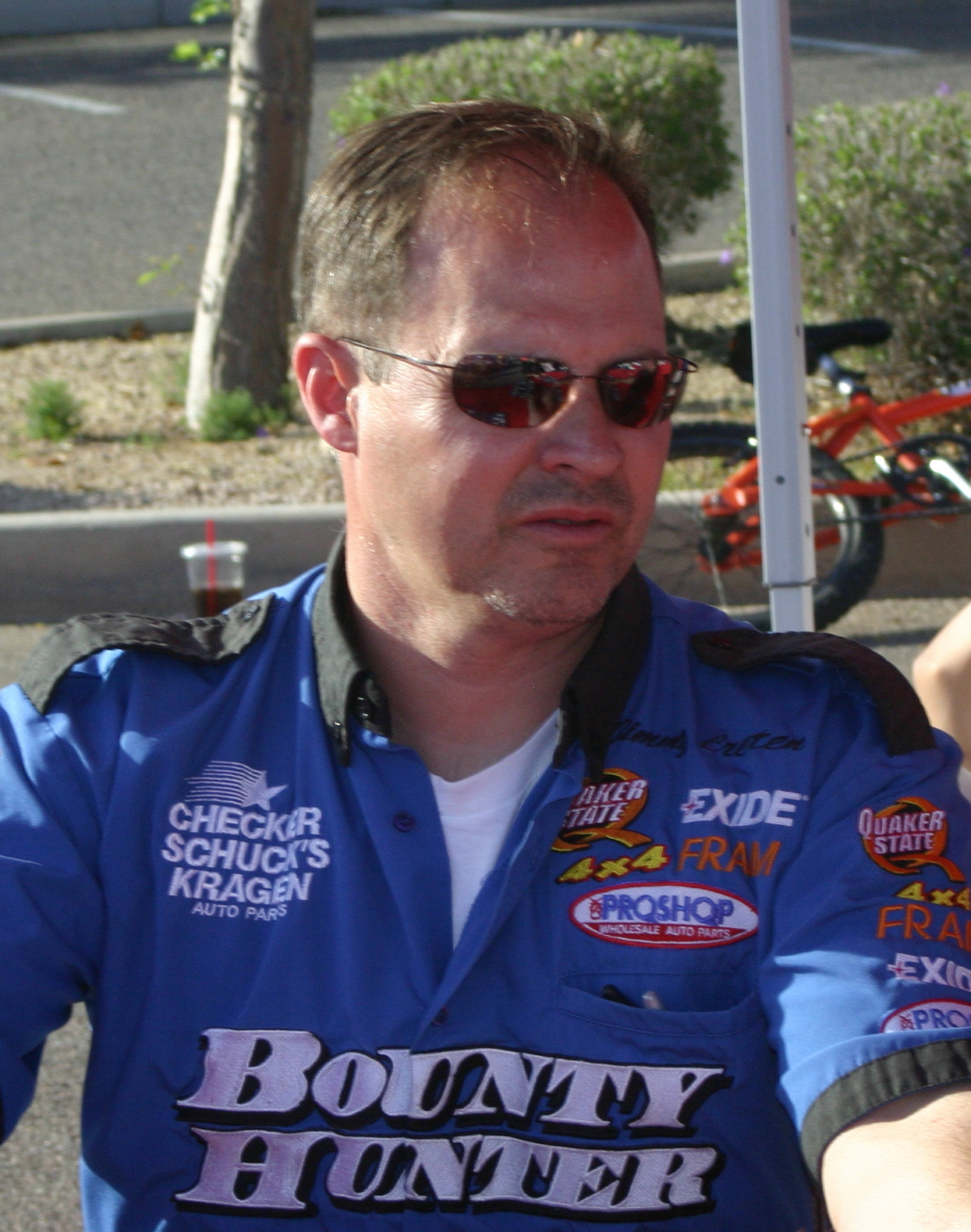
Jimmy Creten, Arizona, 2006

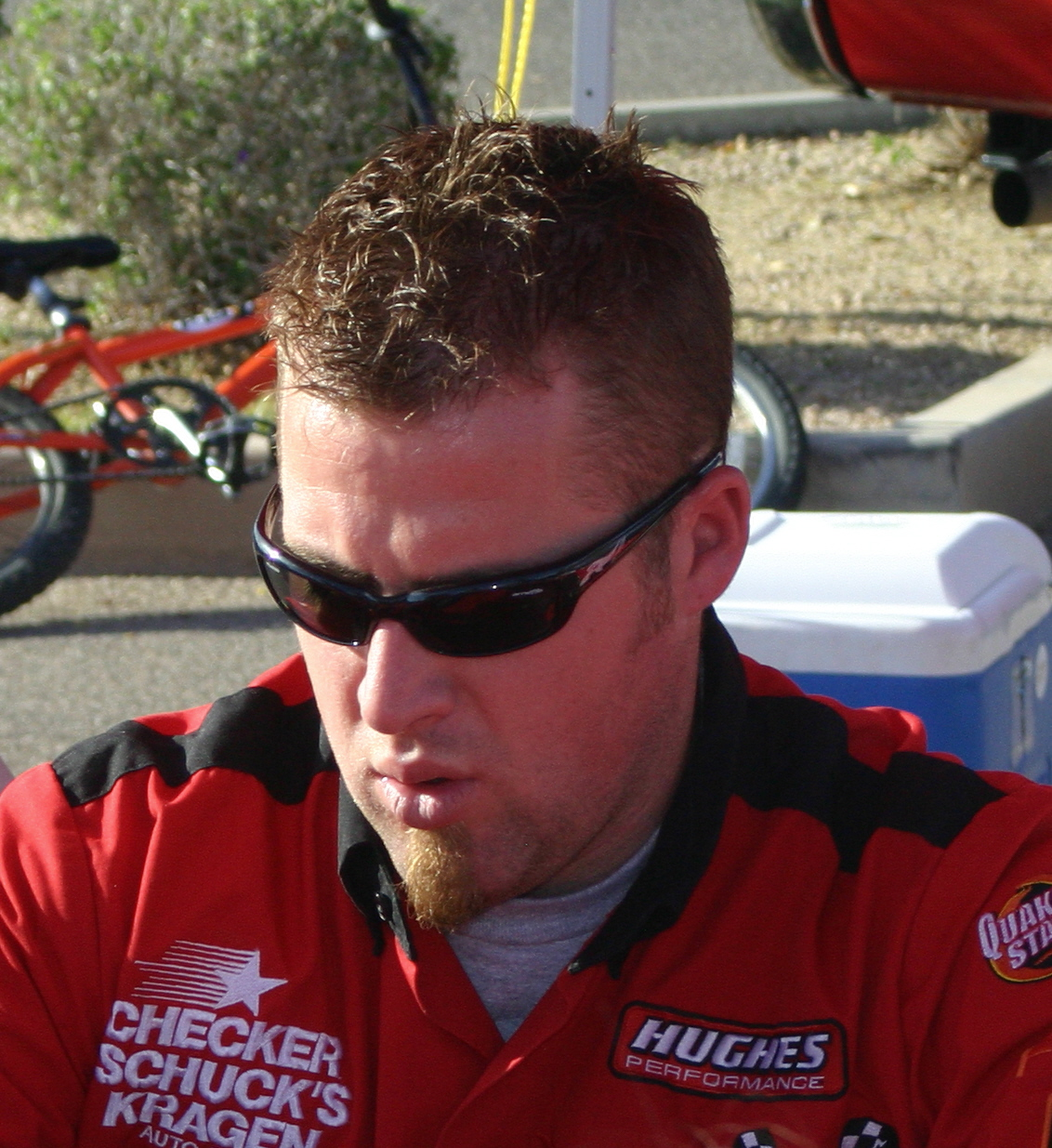
Linsey Weenk, Arizona, 2006

== See also ==
- Monster Truck
- List of Monster Trucks

https://web.archive.org/web/20100608143843/http://www.monsterjam.com/Bios/Drivers/Jimmy_Creten/ https://web.archive.org/web/20100506081147/http://www.monsterjam.com/Bios/Trucks/Bounty_Hunter/ https://web.archive.org/web/20100506081320/http://www.monsterjam.com/Bios/Trucks/Scarlet_Bandit/
