= Avenger (truck) =

Monster truck

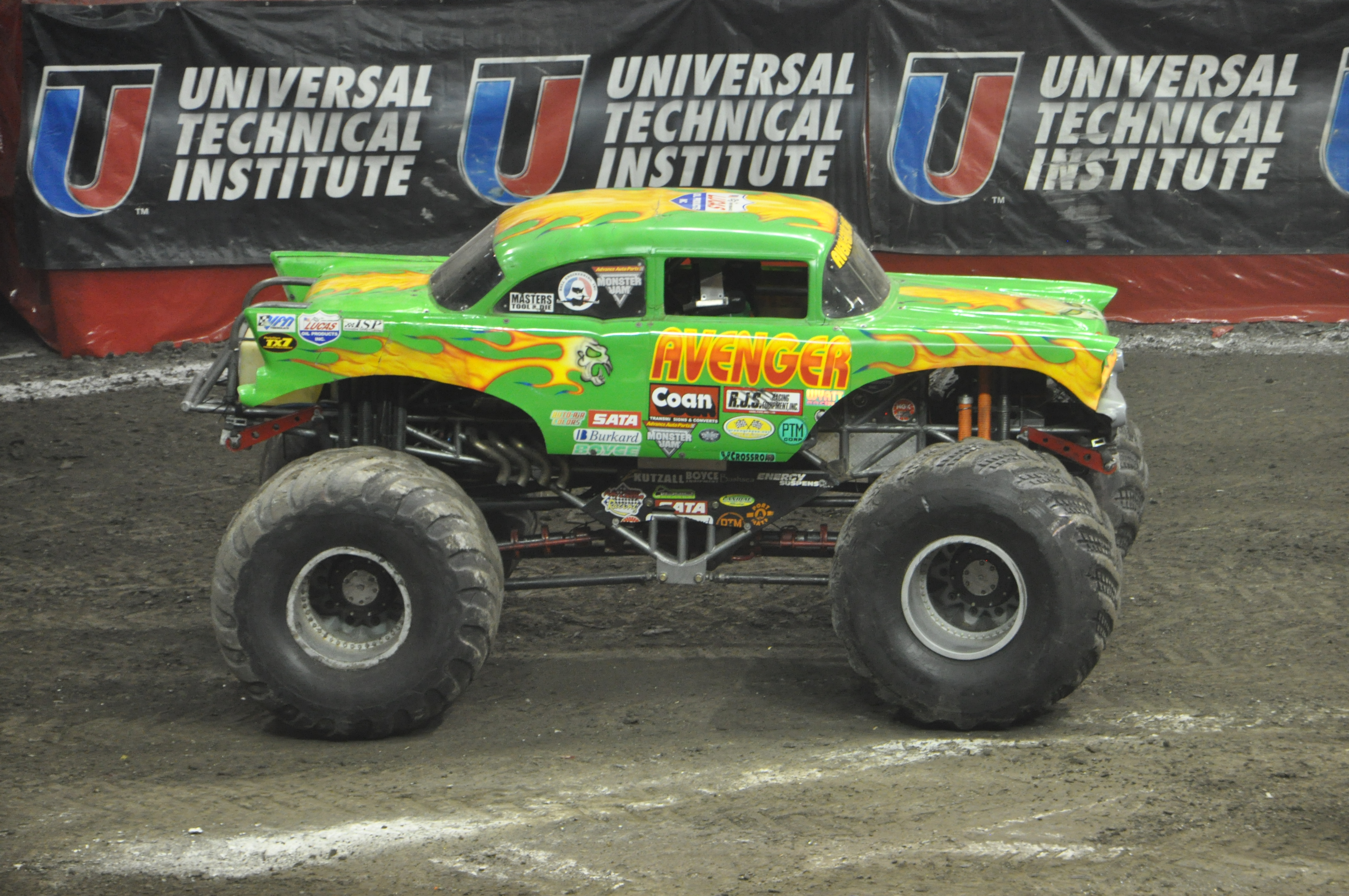

Owner and driver information
- Owner: Team Scream Racing
- Driver(s): Jim Koehler

Truck information
- Year created: 1997
- Body style: 1957 Chevrolet Bel-Air (Formerly 1996 Chevrolet S-10)
- Engine: 540 cubic inch Merlin big block
- Transmission: Bewick Turbo 400
- Tires: 66" Terra/BKT

The Avenger was created in 1997 by Columbus, Michigan native Jim Koehler. The original monster truck sported a forest green Chevrolet S10 body style and a teal chassis and rims. With the exception of the design featured at World Finals 14, the Avenger truck has always sported at least three flaming skulls (one on each side and one on the hood) and flowing flames running from the wheel wells. As time passed, the S10 body was replaced by a 1957 Chevrolet Bel-Air body with bright green headlights, which is the same body style that is run today by "Mr. Excitement."

Avenger is out of the Team Scream stable, which also features the Brutus, Mega-Bite, Spike, Rage, Axe, Mayhem, and Wrecking Crew trucks. The original Avenger chassis is currently retired, while the second one is currently being run as Axe with young driver Joe Foley behind the wheel.

== Body styles ==
Avenger and Jim Koehler is now the only truck and driver to compete in all 24 iterations of the Monster Jam World Finals, which began in 2000. Tom Meents was the other to compete in all until missing World Finals 18 due to a back injury until he returned for the 2017 Monster Jam Path of Destruction Tour in Foxborough. However, the latter driver retired in 2024. There are various versions of the Avenger truck, which are:

- Forest Green Chevrolet S10
- Forest Green 1957 Chevrolet Bel-Air
- Orange Bel-Air
- Half Forest Green and Half Orange Bel-Air
- Chrome Bel-Air
- Toxic Green Bel-Air
- Neon Green Bel-Air
- "Scuba" Light Blue Bel-Air
- Black "Rat Rod" Bel-Air
- Candy Apple Red "Las Vegas" Bel-Air
- Yellow "Two Time Champion" Bel-Air
- "Garners" Candy Apple Red Bel-Air
- Purple Bel-Air
- Garners Towing Style White Bel-Air
- Junkyard Style Light Blue Bel-Air
- Bright Green Chevy S-10
- Dark Green "Celebrating 20 years" Chevy S10 with chrome logo
- Lime Green Custom Nomad
- Red, Blue and White Stepp's Towing Bel-Air
- White and Green “Global” Bel-Air
- Silver “Glow in the Dark” 25th Anniversary Bel-Air
- Gray “Country Music” Bel-Air
- Red, Blue and White "USA flag" Bel-Air
- Gray "War Plane" Bel-Air

== Monster Jam World Finals accomplishments ==
Avenger has taken several titles over the years, but none shine brighter than his two Monster Jam World Finals Freestyle Championships. He won his first world championship title in 2003 with the original Forest Green Bel-Air and teal chassis, Jim shocked the Monster Jam World by being the first Freestyle Champion not named Dennis Anderson or Tom Meents. The following year in 2004 Koehler was stopped on him. He bent a 4-link bar that caused the transmission to break after he went over the cars, causing him to be frustrated. In March 2011, with his red "Las Vegas" Avenger, Jim tied with Cam McQueen in the Nitro Circus Monster Truck in the Freestyle competition, edging out McQueen to claim his second Freestyle title, making Jim Koehler one of only three drivers to have more than one Freestyle title at the World Finals, the others being Tom Meents and Adam Anderson (monster truck driver).

In 2009, Avenger debuted the Aussie Avenger, built specifically for the Extreme Monster Trucks Australia tour. This truck featured a bright orange chassis as well as canary yellow rims, with a classic 1957 Chevy Bel-Air body. Jim traveled "Down Under" for the South Pacific Finals where he continued the tradition of American drivers bringing home the Australian championships with his Freestyle victory. In 2010, Koehler returned to Brisbane for the South Pacific Finals 3 to defend his Freestyle Championship. "Mr. Excitement" held true to his name by taking a second straight championship in freestyle. In 2016, he is driving in the Fox Sports 1 Championship Series.

== Awards ==
=== Monster Jam World Finals ===
- 1999 (Motor Madness World Finals 0, Forest Green S-10)
1. Driver: Jim Koehler
2. Racing: Lost to Bear Foot in Round 1
3. Freestyle: Scored 22
- 2000 (Forest Green S-10)
1. Driver: Jim Koehler
2. Racing: Lost to King Krunch in Round 1
3. Freestyle: Scored 26 - Tied for seventh with Sudden Impact and Bulldozer
- 2001 (Forest Green S-10)
1. Driver: Jim Koehler
2. Racing: Beats Spider-Man in Round 1 due to a broken tire-rod
3. Freestyle: Scored 34 - Tied for fourth with Sting
- 2002 (Forest Green Bel-Air)
1. Driver: Jim Koehler
2. Racing: Lost to Sudden Impact in Round 1
3. Freestyle: Scored 8 - Tied for last with Bulldozer
- 2003 (Forest Green Bel-Air)
1. Driver: Jim Koehler
2. Racing: Lost to Wolverine in Round 1
3. Freestyle: Scored 37 - First
- 2004 (Orange)
1. Driver: Jim Koehler
2. Racing: Lost to Bounty Hunter in Round 1
3. Freestyle: Scored 9 - Tied for last with Blue Thunder and Team Suzuki
- 2005 (Half Orange, Half Forest Green)
1. Driver: Jim Koehler
2. Racing: Lost to Escalade in Round 1
3. Freestyle: Scored 25 - Tied for sixth with Scarlet Bandit and Escalade
- 2006 (Chrome)
1. Driver: Jim Koehler
2. Racing: Lost to El Toro Loco in Round 1
3. Freestyle: Scored 16 - Tied for sixteenth with Pastrana 199
- 2007 (Toxic Green)
1. Driver: Jim Koehler
2. Racing: Lost to Brutus in Round 1
3. Freestyle: Scored 20 - Tied for fifteenth with Pastrana 199
- 2008 (Neon Green)
1. Driver: Jim Koehler
2. Racing: Lost to Captain's Curse in Round 2
3. Freestyle: Scored 17 - Fourteenth
- 2009 (Light Blue)
1. Driver: Jim Koehler
2. Racing: Lost to Brutus in Round 1
3. Freestyle: Scored 4 - Last
- 2010 (Black and White)
1. Driver: Jim Koehler
2. Racing: Lost to Grave Digger in Round 2
3. Freestyle: Scored 25 - Tied for tenth with Blue Thunder and Iron Man
- 2011 (Candy Apple Red)
1. Driver: Jim Koehler
2. Racing: Lost to Batman in Round 1
3. Freestyle: Scored 32 - Tied for first with Nitro Circus (Won its second world title via a tiebreaker.)
- 2012 (Yellow)
1. Driver: Jim Koehler
2. Racing: Lost to Northern Nightmare in Round 1
3. Freestyle: Scored 13
- 2013 (Garners' Candy Apple Red)
1. Driver: Jim Koehler
2. Racing: Lost to Spider-Man in Round 1
3. Freestyle: Scored 23 - Tied for seventh with Zombie and Son-uva Digger
- 2014 (Purple)
1. Driver: Jim Koehler
2. Racing: Lost to Max-D in Round 1
3. Freestyle: Scored 26.5 - Tied for eighth with Wolverine and Overkill Evolution
- 2015 (White)
1. Driver: Jim Koehler
2. Racing: Lost to Neil Elliott's Max-D in Round 1
3. Freestyle: Scored 22 - Tied for thirteenth with Monster Mutt
- 2016 (Rusty Blue)
1. Driver: Jim Koehler
2. Racing: Lost to Adam Anderson's Grave Digger in Round 1
3. Freestyle: Scored 12 - Last
- 2017 (Dark Green Retro S-10)
1. Driver: Jim Koehler
2. Racing: Lost to Son-uva Digger in the Semi-Finals
3. Freestyle: Scored 9.240 - Third
- 2018 (Lime Green Custom Bel-Air Wagon)
1. Driver: Jim Koehler
2. Racing: Lost to Tyler Menninga's Grave Digger in Round 1
3. Freestyle: Scored 2.990 - Last
- 2019 (Red, Blue and White)
1. Driver: Jim Koehler
2. Racing: Lost to Great Clips Mohawk Warrior in Round 1
3. Freestyle: Scored 6.399 - Nineteenth
- 2022 (White and Green)
1. Driver: Jim Koehler
2. Racing: Lost to The Black Pearl in Round 1
3. High Jump: Scored 33.144 ft. - Sixth
4. Freestyle: Scored 6.835 - Fourteenth
- 2023 (Silver “Glow in the Dark”)
1. Driver: Jim Koehler
2. Racing: Lost to Bakugan Dragonoid in Round 2
3. High Jump: Scored 19.9892 ft. - Eighth
4. Freestyle: Scored 4.411 - Twenty-third
- 2024 (Silver)
1. Driver: Jim Koehler
2. Racing: Lost to Wild Side in Round 1
3. Freestyle: Scored 6.708 - Fifteenth
- 2025 (Red, Blue and White "USA flag")
1. Driver: Jim Koehler
2. Racing: Lost to Jurassic Attack in Round 1
3. High Jump: Scored 10.090 - Seventh
4. Freestyle: Scored 4.488 - Twenty-third
- 2026 (Grey)
1. Driver: Jim Koehler
2. Racing: Lost to Dragon in Round 1
3. Freestyle: Scored 0 - Thirteenth
