= List of monster trucks =

This is a list of notable current and former monster trucks.

== List ==
- Air Force Afterburner
- Avenger
- An Escalade
- Batman
- Bear Foot
- Bigfoot
- Black Stallion
- Blue Thunder
- Bulldozer
- Captain's Curse
- Carolina Crusher
- El Toro Loco
- FS1 Cleatus
- Grave Digger (monster truck)
- Gunslinger
- Great Clips Mohawk Warrior
- Lucas Oil Crusader
- Maximum Destruction
- Metal Mulisha
- Monster Mutt
- Nitro Circus
- Northern Nightmare
- Predator
- Pastrana 199
- Pirate's Curse
- Raminator
- Snake Bite
- Sudden Impact
- Superman
- Team Hot Wheels Firestorm
- Team Suzuki
- Team Meents
- USA-1
- WCW Nitro Machine
