= Bob Patison =

American corporate executive (born 1956)

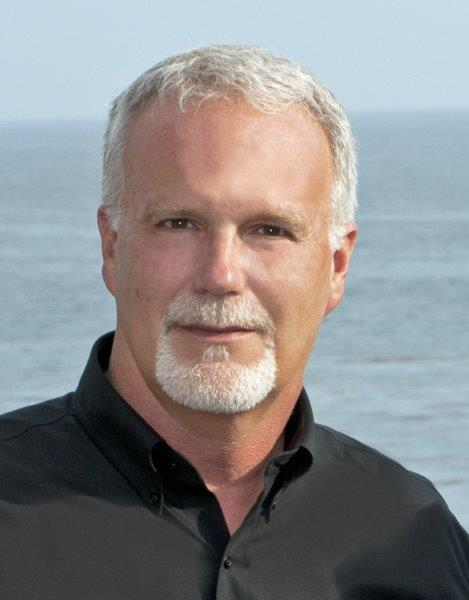
- Born: Robert Eugene Patison; July 2, 1956 (age 69)
- Education: California State University, Fullerton (B.A.); Western State College of Law (J.D.)
- Occupations: Lawyer, businessman
- Organization(s): MAVTV and Lucas Oil
- Spouse: Dawn (married 1978–present)
- Children: Jason, Christin

Robert Eugene "Bob" Patison (born July 2, 1956) is an American corporate executive who serves as president of MAVTV Motorsports Network as well as executive vice-president and general counsel of Lucas Oil Products, Inc. His corporate responsibilities include overseeing Lucas Oil Production Studios and Team Lucas marketing and advertising programs.

== Early life ==
A longtime member of the State Bar of California, Patison graduated from Western State College of Law in Fullerton, California in 1984 and entered private practice, joining a now-defunct local law partnership as a junior partner. Among the law partnership’s smaller clients were the legal needs of Forrest and Charlotte Lucas, who were transitioning out of the long-haul trucking business. Patison took over legal services for them, including for the founding of Lucas Oil Products, Inc., in 1985. Lucas hired Patison to oversee Lucas Oil corporate operations and become second in command of the rapidly expanding company in 1994.

== Lucas Oil Production Studios ==
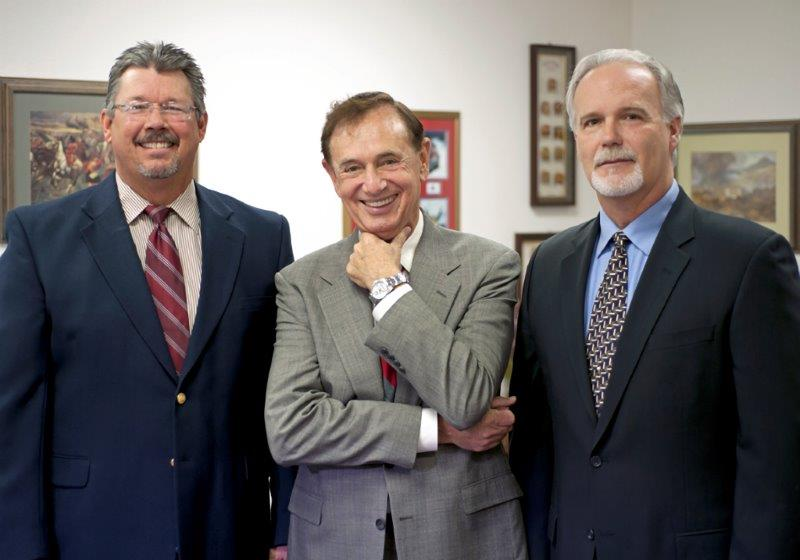
Tom Frederickson, Lucas Oil COO; Forrest Lucas, Lucas Oil President & CEO; Bob Patison, Lucas Oil Exec. VP and legal counsel

Patison also oversees the development of Lucas Oil Production Studios, which has grown to produce more than 300 hours of television annually for CBS, CBS Sports, NBC, NBC Sports and MAVTV. Productions include the Lucas Oil Late Model Dirt Series, Lucas Oil Pro Pulling Series, Lucas Oil Modified Series presented by LoanMart, Lucas Oil Off Road Racing Series presented by GEICO, the Lucas Oil Drag Boat Series, the Lucas Oil Chili Bowl Nationals and The Dave Despain Show, along with live broadcasts of both the 250 and 450 classes opening motos for the entire 12-round Lucas Oil Pro Motocross Championship series. Other entities falling under the Patison umbrella include Lucas Oil Speedway, Lucas I-10 Speedway, and a presence in the Lucas Oil Stadium, home of the Indianapolis Colts.

== MAVTV ==
In 2011 when Forrest Lucas purchased the controlling interest in the MAVTV television network, he appointed Patison as president, with the responsibility of managing day-to-day operations including network growth, programming and production. MAVTV's programming is available in 68 million households across the US.

== Family ==
Since 1978, Bob Patison has been married to his wife Dawn, the operations director at Lucas Oil Productions. They are the parents of Jason and Christin. Jason is the director of programming for MAVTV and an established motor racing star in NASCAR's Super Late Model Series. Christin is a field producer for Lucas Oil Production Studios.
