= Lucas Oil =

American manufacturer and distributor of automotive oil, additives, and lubricants

Lucas Oil Products, Inc.
- Type: Private
- Industry: Automotive
- Founded: 1989
- Headquarters: Indianapolis, Indiana, United States
- Key people: Morgan Lucas (CEO); Katie Lucas (President)
- Products: Automotive additives and lubricants, motor oil, car and marine care, television (Lucas Oil Production Studios, MAVTV & LucasOilRacingTV)
- Website: lucasoil.com

Lucas Oil Products, Inc. is an American manufacturer and distributor of automotive oil, additives, and lubricants founded in 1989.

== History ==
Lucas Oil was founded by trucker Forrest Lucas and his wife Charlotte in 1989. The company is a medium size manufacturer of lubricants, including engine oils, greases, gear lubes, as well as problem-solving additives and car-care products. It produces and markets approximately 270 formulations in 40 countries. In the U.S., Lucas Oil is sold in more than 30,000 auto parts stores, displaying the most variety of shelf products of any oil company, and at truck stops nationwide. Lucas Oil has its plants in the United States. The original plant in Corona, California, which also housed Lucas Oil Corporate Headquarters and several affiliated companies, was closed in late 2022, moving the corporate HQ to Indianapolis, Indiana, before moving headquarters to The Fashion Mall at Keystone in 2024.

In 2003, it opened a new production plant in Corydon, Indiana, and expanded with an additional, multimillion-dollar, 350,000-square-foot facility in 2014. In June 2024, Lucas Oil opened a 25,000-square-foot grease manufacturing expansion at the facility.

In February 2024, Morgan Lucas was named CEO and Katie Lucas was named President of the company.

== Products and markets ==
The company's focus is to create and produce better working oils than those currently available on the commercial marketplace. The company's first product was Heavy Duty Oil Stabilizer, followed by aftermarket products, including:

- Heavy Duty Oil Stabilizer, an ultra high viscosity petroleum multi-use oil supplement for controlling noise, heat and wear in manual transmissions and differentials
- Upper Cylinder Fuel Lubricant, marketed as delivering an extra half mile to the gallon savings for both gasoline and diesel
- Power Steering Stop-Leak, developed to address maintenance issues in rack and pinion steering mechanisms
- Lucas Transmission Fix

According to David Portalatin, an NPD industry analyst, Lucas Oil accounts for nearly all of the segment's recent growth and is one of leading brands in the oil additives segment. The company continues to expand internationally. Current markets include Canada, Latin America, Europe, Asia, Australia, and most recently, the Middle East and Africa.

== Motorsports ==
Lucas Oil owns or sponsors motorsports race teams, events and series at all levels, including NASCAR, INDYCAR, NHRA, IHRA, POWRi, Monster Jam, ASCS, WAR and MLRA. Lucas Oil also owns and operates many high-profile racing series, including Lucas Oil Off Road Racing Series, Lucas Oil Drag Boat Series, Lucas Oil Pro Pulling League, Lucas Oil Late Model Dirt Series, Lucas Oil Modified Series, and the Lucas Oil Speedway in Wheatland, Missouri.

=== MAVTV ===
MAVTV is a motorsports television network with a programming lineup that includes the Lucas Oil Chili Bowl, Lucas Oil Pro Motocross, the FIA World Rally Championship, NHRA Drag Racing, Lucas Oil Drag Boat Racing, Lucas Oil Off Road Racing, Lucas Oil Late Model Dirt, Lucas Oil Modified, Lucas Oil Sprint Cars and custom build shows. MAVTV is currently available on Charter, DirecTV, Google Fiber, Time Warner Cable, Verizon Fios, and hundreds of regional distributors, as well as on streaming providers FuboTV and Tikilive.

=== Lucas Oil Racing TV ===
Launched on January 1, 2016, Lucas Oil Racing TV is a motorsports-dedicated subscription video on demand service. Programming includes both live races and a large library of both United States and international motorsports content. Many shows include expanded pre- and post-race footage, additional interviews, and background content. The service is available through the LucasOilRacing.TV website for smartphones and tablets, as well as Roku, Amazon Fire TV, Android TV, Xbox One, and Xbox 360.

=== Lucas Oil Production Studios ===
Lucas Oil Production Studios produces more than 300 hours of television annually for CBS, CBS Sports, NBC Sports, as well as MAVTV. Lucas Oil Production Studios under the direction of Dawn Patison focus on grass roots motorsports production including the Lucas Oil Modified Series, Lucas Oil Off Road Racing Series, the Dave Despain Show, the Lucas Oil Chili Bowl Nationals, the Lucas Oil Pro Pulling League, and the Lucas Oil Late Model Series.

=== Team Lucas ===
Team Lucas is a marketing platform for Lucas-owned motorsports properties. Partners include Carlyle Tools, GEICO, Toyota, General Tire, OPTIMA Batteries, Rockstar Energy Drink, K&N Filters, and Indianapolis Colts Lucas Oil Stadium. Team Lucas' fan and media exposure includes the many Lucas Oil sponsored series televised by MAVTV and its broadcasting partners.

=== Sponsorships ===
The company is a sponsor of several NASCAR, H1 Unlimited, NHRA, and IndyCar events. In 2005, Lucas Oil founded the Lucas Oil Late Model Dirt Series. Since 2011, it owns the cable network MAVTV, which under its purview went from a male-focused network with a lowbrow point of view to a leading motorsports network.

Since 2004, Lucas Oil has been a partner of the Arrow McLaren team.

On February 28, 2006, it was announced that Lucas Oil had purchased the naming rights to the Lucas Oil Stadium in Indianapolis, Indiana, for $120 million over 20 years. The facility opened in 2008 and is the home field for the NFL's Indianapolis Colts. Other events that have or will be held at the stadium include the 2010 NCAA Men's Basketball Final Four, the 2009 NCAA Men's Basketball Regional Finals, Super Bowl XLVI (February 5, 2012), the 2015 NCAA Men's Basketball Final Four, every Big Ten Football Championship Game since the inaugural game in 2011, every Drum Corps International World Championship since 2009, and the 2026 and 2029 NCAA Men's Final Fours.

In 2009, Lucas Oil founded the short course off-road racing series Lucas Oil Off Road Racing Series. In March 2012, Lucas Oil extended their title sponsorship of the AMA Motocross series.

Since 2011, Lucas Oil has been a main sponsor of the Professional Bull Riders (PBR) association.

At the time he purchased the mansion of Conseco co-founder Stephen Hilbert, Forrest Lucas stated, "I can justify it by having this as a corporate retreat for my employees and for my customers."

The Lucas Oil Crusader Monster Jam truck was debuted in Houston, Texas in 2011. It was driven by Canadian Driver, Linsey Weenk, who drove the Built Ford Tough Blue Thunder monster truck before. Following the truck's and his retirement in 2020, the truck was succeeded by the Lucas Stabilizer, driven by Cynthia Gauthier.

In June 2022, Lucas Oil became a sponsor of Wrexham A.F.C., but withdrew from the deal just two weeks after the announcement.

In January 2024, Lucas Oil became the title sponsor of DAMS, a French Formula Two team, marking the first time they sponsored a team outside North America.

On July 9, 2025, Lucas Oil became the primary jersey patch sponsor of the Indiana Pacers, replacing Fishers-based startup Spokenote as the Pacers' jersey sponsor in a multi-year agreement.

== Lucas Oil Rail Line ==
Lucas Oil Rail Line, formerly known as the Louisville New Albany & Corydon Railroad, was added to the Corydon, Indiana's plant's capabilities in 2006, servicing the main manufacturing facility and several other major businesses in and around the city.

== Agriculture ==
=== Lucas Cattle Company ===
Lucas Cattle Company was founded in 2000 in Cross Timbers, Missouri in the Ozarks. They have bred over 2,000 head of free range Simmental cattle reared on fescue, on a strict culling strategy, with an emphasis on structural soundness and other high quality traits such as longevity, fertility, and udder quality.

=== Protect the Harvest ===
Forrest Lucas is a founder of Protect the Harvest, a nonprofit organization which opposes "the radical animal rights movement” and particularly the Humane Society of the United States, which it calls "a wealthy and successful attack group". In 2012, Lucas said that he had invested over $600,000 in the organization. Its stated goals include educating the public about animal agriculture, and preventing the passing of legislative or market-initiated bans on particular production practices.

Robert Patison, general counsel for Lucas Oil Products, issued a statement on behalf of the company: "We provide significant financial support for a broad range of organizations that serve the needs of veterans, women, other minority groups, and disadvantaged individuals throughout the United States. Fairness and equality are core values of our company."

== See also ==
- Lucas Oil Stadium
- Lucas Oil Raceway
- Lucas Oil Late Model Dirt Series
- Lucas Oil Slick Mist 200
- Lucas Oil Indiana Governor's Cup
