= Black Stallion =

Black Stallion may refer to:

- The Black Stallion, a book published in 1941 by author Walter Farley
- The Black Stallion (film), a 1979 film directed by Carroll Ballard and based on the novel
- Adventures of the Black Stallion, a TV series loosely based on the movies The Black Stallion and The Black Stallion Returns
- Black Stallion, an alternative name for King of the Sierras, a 1938 American film directed by Samuel Diege and Arthur Rosson
- Black Stallion (truck), a monster truck that races on the USHRA circuit
- Black Stallion (film), a 2010 Malayalam-language film from India starring Kalabhavan Mani, Bala and Namitha
- Black Stallion, a 2020 remix album by the American rock band Deftones included as a bonus disc with the 20th-anniversary release of White Pony
