= Racer Network =

American cable and satellite television channel

- Country: United States
- Broadcast area: International
- Headquarters: Brownsburg, Indiana

Programming
- Picture format: 1080i (HDTV)

Ownership
- Owner: Racer Media & Marketing

History
- Launched: October 1, 2004
- Former names: MAVTV (2004–2025)

Links
- Website: Racer.com

Racer Network (formerly known as MAVTV) is an American cable and satellite television channel owned by the motorsports media company Racer, which mainly airs programming focused around motorsports and programming for automotive enthusiasts. CJ Olivares serves as the network's president.

== History ==
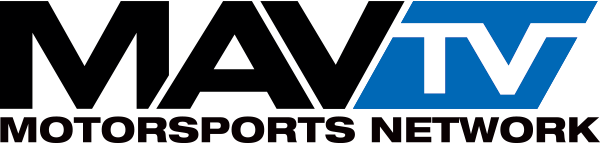
Former MAVTV logo

MavTV (short for Maverick Television) launched on October 1, 2004, based out of Atlanta with distribution limited to select cable companies. The network was privately held and founded by four former executives from Showtime Networks—Steve Severn, Steve Smith, Doug Jost and Rob Stevens. It had no connections to the NBA's Dallas Mavericks or Mark Cuban, their owner, nor to Maverick Television, a British reality television production company owned by All3Media. It featured male-oriented programming including motorsports, mixed martial arts and professional wrestling.

The network's 1080i high definition feed was launched during the fall of 2008. The standard definition version of the network is downscaled from the HD master feed at the cable operator's headend level.

In October 2011, longtime partner lubricants company Lucas Oil purchased MavTV; the company had provided and sponsored most of the network's motorsports rights even before their purchase, and the network was likely to go dark without the purchase as programming rights had deteriorated towards barter programming and heavy repeats of library content. The network was quickly reformatted away by the new management from a completely male focus towards a general action-oriented family programming direction, while retaining motorsports programming including the Lucas Oil Late Model Dirt Series, Lucas Oil Off Road Racing Series and Lucas Oil Pro Pulling League. The network was also advertised on the containers of many Lucas Oil products.

On July 4, 2012, Lucas rebranded the network, making MavTV's name all capitalized, but with the MAV initials standing for "Movies, Action, and Variety" with the addition of films and more concert programming to the schedule, and a gradual drawdown of motorsport-related programming, to help maintain its cable carriage mainly among digital sports tiers. However, classic-oriented digital over-the-air networks gained popularity at the same time, including Antenna TV, MeTV, Movies! and getTV. Therefore, the network eventually returned to an all-motorsports schedule by the start of 2016.

On March 27, 2025, MAVTV was acquired by motorsports media company Racer, which quickly made its mark by rebranding the channel as Racer Network the same date, with a new imaging campaign to come to reinforce the brand.

== Programming ==
=== Motorsports ===
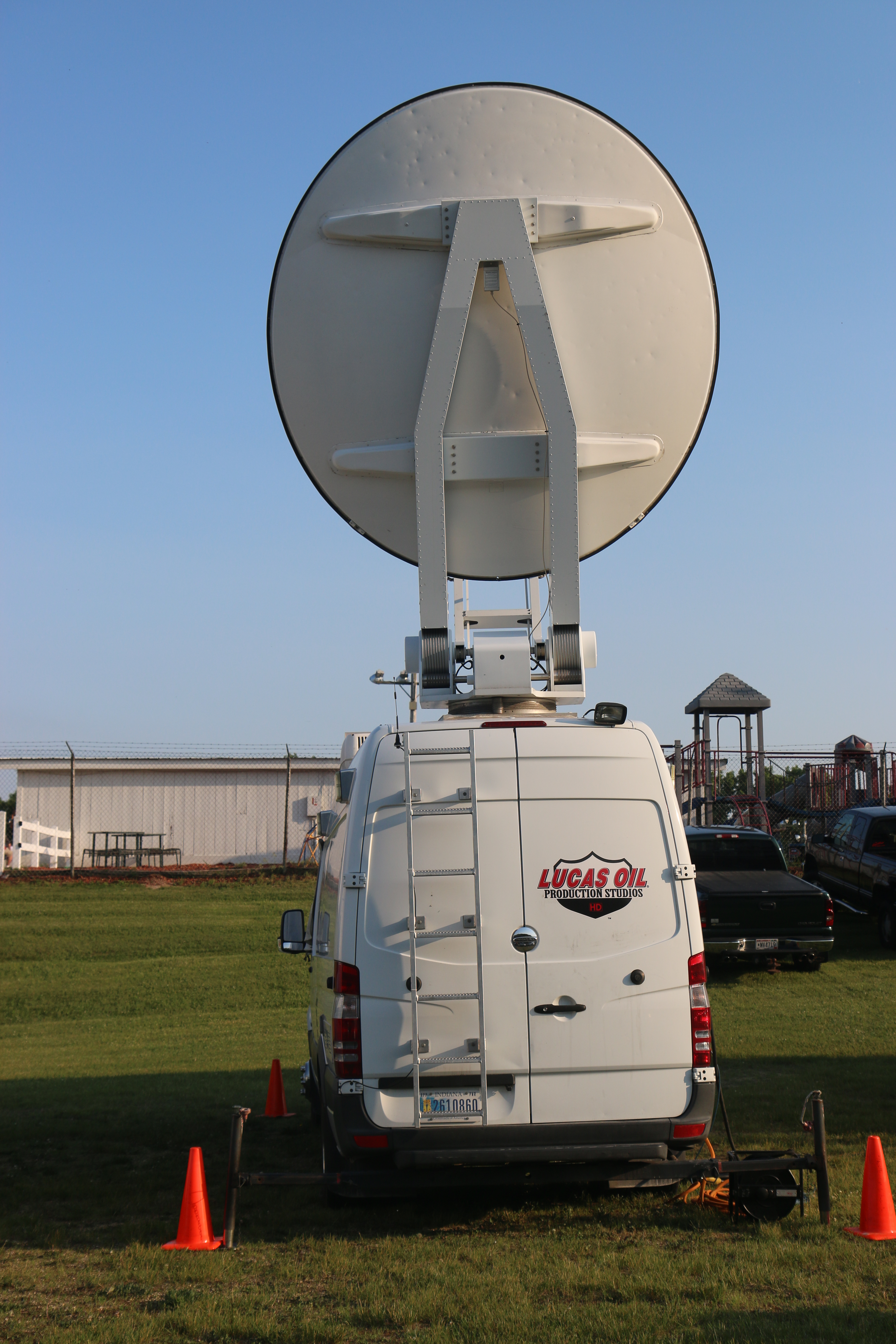
MAVTV satellite broadcasting van at 2018 ARCA race

MAVTV contracted with the Automobile Racing Club of America, the auto racing sanctioning body, to air at least 6 races in 2008, including both 100-mile dirt races at the Illinois State Fairgrounds in Springfield, and the Southern Illinois State Fairgrounds in DuQuoin. SpeedFreaks hosts Kenny Sargent and Crash Gladys also appeared on episodes of the Lucas Motorsports Hour.

MAVTV sponsored the MAVTV 500, the final race in the 2012 season of the IndyCar Series, which took place at the Auto Club Speedway in Fontana, California.

MAVTV did their first live motorsports event, the Lucas Oil Challenge Cup featuring the Lucas Oil Off Road Racing Series on October 27, 2013, from Lake Elsinore Motorsports Park. They will also do live coverage of the Lucas Oil Chili Bowl Nationals, one of the biggest midget car races every year. The East Bay Winter Nationals from the Lucas Oil Late Model Dirt Series and all Moto1 rounds of the Lucas Oil AMA Pro Motocross championship in 2014.

In 2014, MAVTV partnered with professional road racing series Pirelli World Challenge to air the Pirelli World Challenge Touring Car Championship.

As Fox's Speed converted into the general-interest Fox Sports 1 in 2012, MavTV added several of its former motorsports programming.

In 2017, MAVTV signed a multi-year deal with ARCA Racing to bring almost all their races live or broadcast at later time/date. Outside the races broadcast from Fox Sports.

In 2018, MavTV signed a deal to show highlights of Tony Stewart All Star Circuit of Champions Also MAVTV expanded its coverage of ARCA Racing with 11 of its 12 races broadcasting live

In 2019, MAVTV is showing all of its ARCA races its broadcast live for the first time.

In 2020, the network began to air the MotoAmerica road racing series. In 2023, it signed rights for the Monster Jam and Formula Drift.

In 2024, the European racing series DTM switched from Motor Trend to the Racer Network. Since then, the races have been broadcast live or as highlights. The same year, the network began to air the Speedway World Championship.

=== Other programming ===
Before Lucas Oil took over full management of the network in late 2011, MAVTV also carried male-oriented programming such as the second season of Rad Girls, American Tailgater, Wrestlicious TakeDown, Ultimate Combat Experience, Bikini AllStars and Best of the Best. In addition, MAVTV presented the male-specific documentary series Manumentaries.

Overnights had been filled by music video/interactive SMS programming from NOYZ via a time brokerage agreement before that company went bankrupt in early 2008.

In 2007, MAVTV struck a deal with the Women's Flat Track Derby Association to broadcast two of the three roller derby finals: the Eastern Regional Tournament (Heartland Havoc, which was broadcast as a series of one-hour weekly episodes) and the National Championships (Texas Shootout).

On April 27, 2010, MAVTV signed a deal with Sony Pictures giving them access to select titles from Sony's film library. The deal was part of MAVTV's programming strategy to expand its schedule and abandon their former all-male programming direction. The network added films from the Warner Bros. Pictures library in July 2012. Therefore, MAVTV aired several classic cowboy programming such as The Lone Ranger, Starsky & Hutch, and Bonanza.

In 2013, MAVTV added the King of the Cage mixed martial arts promotion and Championship Wrestling from Hollywood.

== Personnel ==
Key people at Racer Network include:

- CJ Olivares, President of Racer Network
- Mark Carter, Vice President of Sales
- Scott McLemore, Director of Production & Programming
- Kathy Baichtal, Director of Programming & Scheduling
- Shawn Stafford, Director of Network Operations
- Marc Mazarin, Director of Marketing

== Carriage ==
Racer Network can be found in the US on Cablevision, Spectrum, GCI in Alaska, select cable systems within the Caribbean Co-op, Xfinity, RCN Corporation, AT&T U-verse and DirecTV.

As per an email sent to its subscribers, Verizon FiOS removed the channel from its TV service along with Youtoo TV, Blue Highways TV, and Black Belt TV as of December 31, 2012, making it available as an "On Demand" service. However, the channel returned to Verizon FiOS on June 10, 2014.

DirecTV added MAVTV on June 10, 2013. The channel is carried in high definition.

MAVTV Canada was launched in January, 2017 in a partnership with the Neon Star Sports & Entertainment Inc, which produces Canadian content. It rebranded as REV TV Canada in 2020.

Dish Network previously carried MAVTV in high definition from May 8, 2009 to May 12, 2015. Dish dropped the channel as MAVTV and its parent company Lucas Oil failed to reach a new agreement to continue carrying the channel.

FuboTV was added in March 2018 with Sportsman Channel, Outdoor Channel, World Fishing Network, Outside TV and till late October motorsports.tv to the Adventure Plus Package.

A free version of the channel, branded "Racer Select" (formerly "MAVTV Select"), provides a selection of network programming through advertising-supported over-the-top media services Pluto TV, Stirr, The Roku Channel and Plex, among others.

== Programming ==
=== Motorsports coverage ===
Oval racing

- ARCA Menards Series (2008, 2015, 2017–2022)
  - Nashville round shown on tape delay in 2015
- ARCA Menards Series East
- ARCA Menards Series West
- ASA STARS National Tour (2023-present)
- Lucas Oil ASCS Sprint Car Series
- Lucas Oil Chili Bowl Nationals presented by General Tire (2014–present)
  - Saturday night alphabet mains are featured live.
- INEX Legends Cars & Bandolero Cars (2014–present)
  - Bojangles Summer Shootout at Charlotte Motor Speedway has aired on the network since 2014.
  - A part of the Acceleration 2014 coverage, the Legend SuperCup was aired on the network
- Knoxville Raceway's Dirt Dreams (2014–present)
- Lucas Oil Late Model Dirt Series
  - live coverage of the East Bay Winter Nationals
- Lucas Oil Modified Series
  - The 2013 Lucas Oil Challenge Cup was live on the network, it was the network's first live race. The series did not feature live coverage in 2014 however.
- Lucas Oil POWRI Midgets
  - the 2013 & 2014 Jason Leffler Memorial from Wayne County Speedway was covered on Dirty 30
  - Other races such as DuQuoin from 2014 will be covered on Lucas Oil On The Edge
- NEMA Midgets
  - The 2014 Boston Louie Seymour Memorial at Seekonk was featured with full race coverage on the SPEED SPORT program.
- Novelis Supermodifieds
  - 2 to 3 races from the 2014 season at Oswego Speedway were shown on MavTV under the SPEED SPORT program. Those races included the Budweiser International Classic & the Jim Shampine Memorial
- Outlaw kart racing
  - The network featured the SPEED SPORT Challenge at Millbridge Speedway on the SPEED SPORT program in 2014 and 2015.
- SRL Spears Southwest Tour (2014–present)
  - The 2014 races at Irwindale & The Bullring at LVMS were aired.
- Super DIRTcar Series (2015)
  - The round at Rolling Wheels in 2015 was shown on the network
- The Dirt (2014–present)
  - The Dirt features the weekly divisions at WXC Speedway at Western Springs.
- USAC Silver Crown Series (2015–present)
  - Sulmar Classic at Terre Haute to be shown, a part of the JackSlash Dirty 30 program.
- USAC AMSOIL National Sprint Cars (2014–present)
  - several rounds from the 2014 season were featured on the JackSlash Dirty 30 program. Those include the Kokomo Sprint Car Smackdown, Oval Nationals @ Perris and the season finale at Canyon.
- USAC Honda National Midget Championship (2014–present)
  - several rounds from the 2014 and 2015 seasons were featured on the JackSlash Dirty 30 program.
- World of Outlaws Sprint Cars (2014–present)
  - The FVP Knoxville Nationals presented by Lucas Oil have been aired on the network on a tape delay basis since 2014.

Road racing

- 24H Series
- Acceleration (2014–present)
- Historic Grand Prix of Monaco
- Shannons Nationals Motor Racing Championships
- Supercars Championship
- Stock Car Pro Series Brasil
- Trans-Am Series
- Kuhmo Tyres V8 Touring Car Series
- Pirelli World Challenge (2013, 2014)
  - TC rounds aired originally on the network, GT/GTA/GTS races from the 2014 season were re-aired on the network afterwards.

Drag racing

- ANDRA Drag Racing Series (2014–present)
- FIA European Drag Racing Championship
- Lucas Oil Pro Pulling League

Drifting

- Australian Drifting Grand Prix (2014–present)
- British Drift Championship
- D1NZ

Off-road racing

- Best In The Desert
- Lucas Oil Off Road Racing Series
- Monster Jam (2023–present)
  - 26 Stadium Championship Series episodes
  - 20 Arena in 30 episodes
  - 40 Inside Monster Jam episodes
- World Rally Championship (2013–present)
  - live coverage of several stages started in 2014

Motorcycling

- ATVMX National Championship (2014–present)
- AMA Endurocross
- Australasian Superbike Championship (2014–present)
- British Motocross Championship
- British Superbike Championship
- Lucas Oil AMA Pro Motocross Championship
- Sidecar World Championship
- GEICO Motorcycle Superbike Shootout
- MotoAmerica
- Superbike World Championship
- Malaysian Cub Prix
- FIM Supermoto World Championship
- FIM Speedway Grand Prix
- FIM X-Trial World Championship
- Ice Speedway Gladiators
- Superprestigio Dirt Track
  - The Superprestigio Dirt Track Barcelona 2014 was featured with full race coverage on the SPEED SPORT program in 2014.

Boat racing

- American Sprint Boat Racing Association
- Lucas Oil Drag Boat Racing Series
- Powerboat P1 SuperStock Championship
- V8 Superboats

=== Motorsport highlight and reality shows ===
- Dirty 30/Pavement 30/Jackslash.com
- Lucas Oil Motorsports Hour
- Lucas Oil On the Edge
- SPEED SPORT
- SPEED SPORT Magazine
- The Dave Despain Show
- The Motocross Files
- MotorWeek
- SpeedFreaks
