= Lucas Oil Crusader =

Monster truck, 2011–2020

Owner and driver information
- Owner: FELD Motorsports
- Driver(s): Linsey Weenk

Truck information
- Year created: 2011
- Body style: 2004 Cadillac Escalade
- Engine: 540 cubic inch Merlin big block
- Transmission: Coan 2-speed
- Tires: 66" Terra BKT Tires

Lucas Oil Crusader (or simply known as Crusader) was a monster truck that raced in the Monster Jam professional monster truck racing series. It was driven by Linsey Weenk, former Blue Thunder driver, who debuted in 2011 in Houston, Texas. It featured one of the first trucks to change its roof artwork, which is the medieval knight decal and the truck's logo, and then after a while, it was replaced with the Lucas Oil logo. It also had the Lucas Oil flags at the back of the truck. It was sponsored by Lucas Oil since its debut in Houston, Texas, 2011. The truck was supposedly retired on July 28, 2019, but returned in 2020 to compete in Stadium Championship Series Red.

== History ==
In 2011, the truck debuted at Houston, Texas, and the truck was driven by Linsey Weenk, who had previously driven Blue Thunder and Iron Outlaw from previous years. However, the truck made its first Monster Jam World Finals appearance with Weenk still behind-the-wheel. He defeated Nitro Circus in Round 2, El Toro Loco in Round 3, but lost to Maximum Destruction in the semi-finals in Racing. He got a 27 in freestyle which tied with El Toro Loco.

In 2012, the truck has red beadlocks in each tire. Weenk once again competed at the World Finals. He defeated Advanced Auto Parts Grinder in Round 2, but he lost to Monster Energy in Round 3 in Racing. He got a 21 in freestyle. In the same year, Linsey was the first driver to land 2 backflips in one single freestyle run. The first one was in bonus time, and the second one was after all the scores were in, but broke both rear wheels (only for the Monster Jam fans), in Metlife Stadium, East Rutherford, New Jersey.

In 2013, Weenk competed again at the World Finals. However, he lost to Captain America in Round 1 in Racing. He got a 27 in freestyle which tied with Iron Man and Stone Crusher.

In 2014, Weenk competed in the World Finals for Racing and Freestyle. However, he defeated FOX Sports 1 Cleatus in Round 1, Spider-Man in Round 2, but lost to Grave Digger in Round 3. He got a 30.5 in freestyle.

In 2015, Weenk gets invited at the World Finals. He defeated Zombie in Round 1, Grave Digger the Legend in Round 2, but lost to Monster Mutt in Round 3 in Racing. He got a 26 in freestyle.

In 2016, Weenk competed at the World Finals for the 15th time. He defeated Dragon in Round 1, but lost to Coty Saucier's Monster Energy in Round 2 in Racing. He got a 17.5 in freestyle.

In 2017, Weenk competed in the FS1 East Series and won the Series. Linsey competed at the World Finals, he defeated Adam Anderson's Grave Digger in Round 1, but lost to Megalodon in Round 2 in Racing. He got a 6.675 in freestyle.

In 2018, Weenk once again got invited at the World Finals for the 18th time. He was defeated by FS1 Cleatus in Round 1 in Racing. He got a 8.691 in freestyle.

On 28 July 2019, the truck was supposedly retired after its last show at Hagerstown (due to Monster Jam's contract with Lucas Oil ending that year), but returned in 2020.

In 2020, the truck competes on Stadium Championship Series Red (which would later be ended due to the COVID-19 pandemic) and finishes 4th in standings.

In December, the truck was retired permanently, as revealed by Linsey himself in an Instagram post.

== Drivers ==
- Linsey Weenk (2011–2020)
- Marc McDonald (2020; Indianapolis and Atlanta event)

== Awards ==
=== Monster Jam World Finals ===
2011
Driver – Linsey Weenk
Racing – Lost to Maximum Destruction in Round 4
Freestyle – Scored 27 - Tied for Seventh with El Toro Loco
2012
Driver – Linsey Weenk
Racing – Lost to Monster Energy in Round 3
Freestyle – Scored 21 - Ninth
2013
Driver – Linsey Weenk
Racing – Lost to Captain America in Round 1
Freestyle – Scored 27 - Tied for Fourth with Iron Man and Stone Crusher
2014
Driver – Linsey Weenk
Racing – Lost to Grave Digger in Round 3
Freestyle – Scored 30.5 - Tied for Fifth with Captain America
2015
Driver – Linsey Weenk
Racing – Lost to Monster Mutt in Round 3
Freestyle – Scored 26 - Tenth
2016
Driver – Linsey Weenk
Racing – Lost to Coty Saucier's Monster Energy in Round 2
Freestyle – Scored 17.5 - Seventeenth
2017
Driver – Linsey Weenk
Racing – Lost to Megalodon in Round 2
Freestyle – Scored 6.695 - Twenty-Fourth
2018
Driver – Linsey Weenk
Racing – Lost to FS1 Cleatus in Round 1
Freestyle – Scored 8.691 - Fourth
2019
Driver – Linsey Weenk
Racing – Lost to Son-Uva-Digger in Round 2
Freestyle – Scored 8.907 - Sixth

== See also ==
- Monster truck
- List of monster trucks
