= Air Force Afterburner =

Monster truck

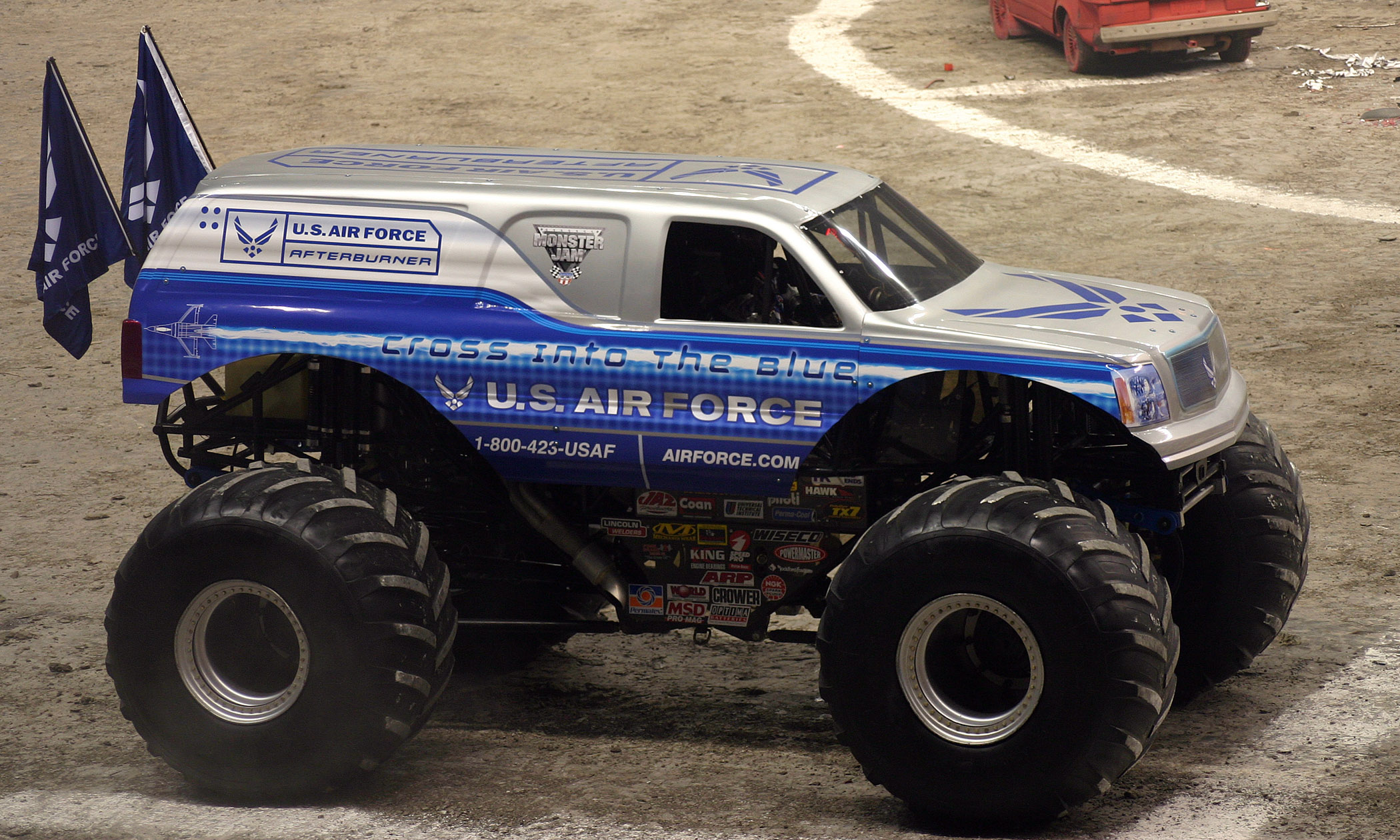

Owner and driver information
- Owner: Feld Entertainment
- Driver(s): Paul Cohen (2006); Damon Bradshaw (2007–2011)
- Home city: Palmetto, Florida

Truck information
- Year created: 2006
- Body style: Cadillac Escalade
- Chassis: Cohen-built frame
- Engine: 8.9 L Merlin 540 V8
- Transmission: 2-speed Coan automatic
- Tires: 66 in Goodyear Terra

Air Force Afterburner was a Monster Jam monster truck sponsored by the United States Air Force. It was operated by Feld Entertainment and primarily driven by Damon Bradshaw, a former professional motocross and supercross racer. The truck competed on the United States Hot Rod Association (USHRA) circuit from 2006 until its retirement in 2011.

== History ==
The Air Force Afterburner made its debut in 2006, built to represent the power and speed associated with the U.S. Air Force. The truck featured a Cadillac Escalade body design painted in blue and silver with Air Force insignia, resembling the aesthetics of modern jet aircraft. It ran on standard 66 inches (1.7 m) tires and was powered by a 1,465 horsepower (1,092 kW) Merlin 540 cubic-inch supercharged V8 engine.

The truck was first driven by Paul Cohen during the 2006 season, who later transitioned to serve as crew chief when Damon Bradshaw assumed driving duties in 2007. Under Bradshaw, Air Force Afterburner quickly became known for its high-energy freestyle performances and consistency in competition.

In 2009, Air Force Afterburner achieved its greatest success when Bradshaw won the Monster Jam World Finals X Freestyle Championship in Las Vegas on March 28, 2009. The win was a highlight in Bradshaw’s monster truck career and a key promotional victory for the Air Force’s ongoing partnership with Monster Jam.

The truck continued to compete through the 2011 season before being retired. Despite the truck’s retirement, the United States Air Force continued to maintain a sponsorship presence within Monster Jam events for several years afterward.

== Design and Features ==
Air Force Afterburner was designed to embody the look and spirit of a modern fighter jet. The Escalade body was modified with aerodynamic details, stylized jet intakes, and afterburner-themed graphics. The truck’s promotional tie-ins often featured Air Force recruitment booths and displays at Monster Jam events, emphasizing teamwork, technology, and speed as parallels between the Air Force and the sport of monster trucks.

== Legacy ==
Although retired, Air Force Afterburner remains one of the most memorable sponsorship collaborations in Monster Jam history. Its combination of military branding, skilled driving by Damon Bradshaw, and success at the World Finals helped solidify its reputation as a fan favorite during the late 2000s. Bradshaw’s performances in the truck are frequently cited among his most accomplished moments in monster truck competition.

== Competition record ==
Throughout its competitive career from 2006 to 2011, Air Force Afterburner participated in numerous Monster Jam events across the United States and internationally. The truck became known for its consistent freestyle performances and success under Damon Bradshaw, whose aggressive style thrilled fans and earned him the nickname "The Monster."

2006	Paul Cohen	Cohen-built custom chassis	Debut season; established team and setup	Did not qualify
2007	Damon Bradshaw	Cohen-built custom chassis	First full season with Bradshaw as driver	Competed in Freestyle
2008	Damon Bradshaw	Cohen-built custom chassis	Multiple stadium freestyle wins	Reached Freestyle Finals
2009	Damon Bradshaw	Cohen-built custom chassis	Won Monster Jam World Finals X Freestyle Championship	1st (Freestyle)
2010	Damon Bradshaw	Cohen-built custom chassis	Consistent finalist in stadium tour events	Competed in Freestyle
2011	Damon Bradshaw	Cohen-built custom chassis	Final competitive season for truck	Did not qualify

During its six-year career, Air Force Afterburner earned several freestyle victories and was regarded as one of the top-performing trucks of its era. Bradshaw’s 2009 World Finals victory marked the peak of the team’s success, and the truck remained a fan favorite until its retirement.
