= Speed Sport =

American auto racing periodical

- The February 27, 1963 issue covering the 1963 Daytona 500
- Publisher: East Paterson Herald Publishing
- Founded: 1934
- First issue: 1934
- Country: United States
- Website: English

Speed Sport, formerly the National Speed Sport News (NSSN), is an American magazine and website covering national, local, and regional auto racing topics. Yahoo! News called it "one of the most famous motorsports publications in the country" when it stopped publishing the traditional weekly print version in 2011. The New York Times said it has "carried news and, when available, photos, from virtually any dirt track open on a Saturday night."

National Speed Sport News began during the Great Depression as a weekly print newspaper. Chris Economaki published the newspaper for forty years. It was published exclusively on the magazine's website for a year before being purchased by its current owners in 2012 along with an accompanying monthly magazine, which became known as Speed Sport.

== History ==
The newspaper was first published by East Paterson Herald Publishing Co. on August 16, 1934, as the National Auto Racing News. Future editor Chris Economaki sold some of the first copies at Ho-Ho-Kus Speedway. He started writing a column in 1936. It held the first national auto racing convention in New York in 1940. It became known as the National Speed Sport News in 1943 when the publisher William Kay formed The Kay Publishing Group. Auto racing was banned in the United States during World War II and the newspaper had moved to monthly publication in 1944. When the ban was lifted on August 16, 1945, and it switched to biweekly publications then back to weekly papers in 1947. Kay died from a heart attack in 1950 and assistant editor Economaki took over as the lead publisher.

A. J. Foyt was featured on a cover story on September 12, 1956, two years before he rose to prominence in Indy Car. Microfilm versions of the magazine were added to the Library of Congress in 1983. Corrine Economaki took over as publisher in 1990 from her father. The magazine began publishing columns online in November 2001.

The weekly magazine ceased print production on March 23, 2011. ESPN cited the reason for its demise to the "economy and this slow death knell of newspapers in general." NASCAR Scene had stopped publishing in 2010. AutoWeek associate publisher Dutch Mandel, a competitor, reacted "there wasn't a time that I didn't pore over NSSN when I could get my hands on it."

Turn 3 Media, a consortium of Curt Moon, Joseph B. Tripp, Ralph Sheheen, and Vernon Massey, purchased National Speed Sport News in 2012, launching the Speed Sport monthly magazine that March.

The launch of the new magazine also allowed the new owners to rebrand the entire franchise. In May 2014, NSSN and MAVTV launched the television newsmagazine version of the show, also named Speed Sport Magazine with a show carrying highlights of grass roots motorsports, Speed Sport. By November 2016, the show's Web domain name and masthead on the Web site dropped the traditional National Speed Sport News title in favour of the now familiar Speed Sport title, with coverage including both domestic and international motorsport categories.

The Speed Sport franchise expanded in 2017 when Turn 3 Media acquired Sprint Car & Midget Magazine. In 2019, SpeedSport.TV, which will be renamed Speed Sport 1 in 2022, was unveiled. It allows grassroots circuits to stream broadcasts of local events on a subscription service similar to rivals Speed 51 (now Racing America, owned by the NASCAR Cup Series' Race Team Alliance), FloSports (NASCAR's partner for selected grassroots series), and DIRTVision (World Racing Group).

https://www.speedsport.com/more/turn-3-media-riivet-announce-speed-sport-1-network/
