= Black Stallion (truck) =

1982 monster truck

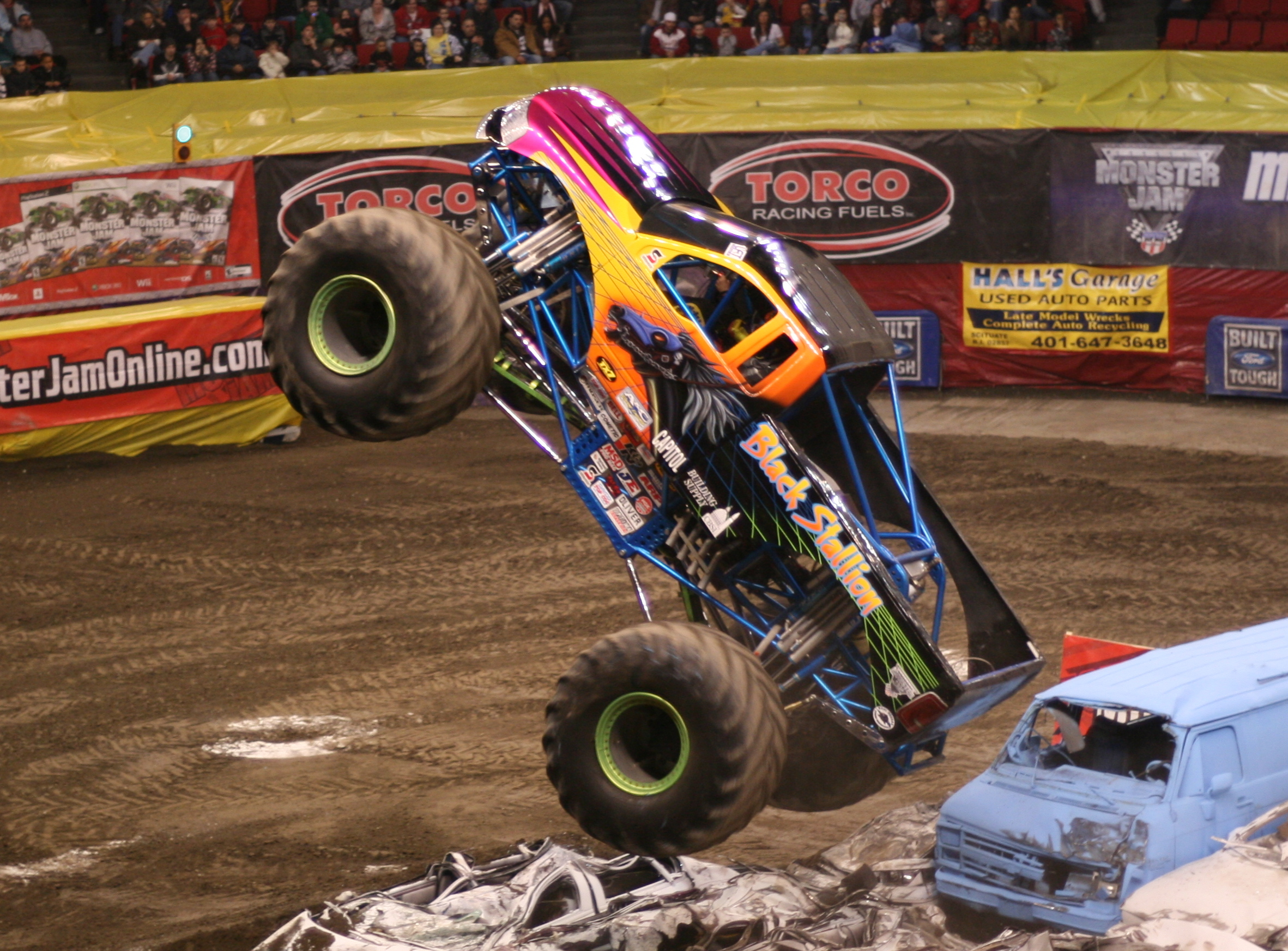

Owner and driver information
- Owner: Michael & Denise Vaters
- Driver(s): Michael Vaters
- Home city: Hagerstown, MD

Truck information
- Year created: 1982
- Chassis: Custom designed and built by Michael Vaters
- Engine: 540 C.I. Ford Racing (big block, blown, fuel injected)
- Transmission: 3-speed Ford C6
- Tires: EcoWork 66"x43"x25"

Black Stallion is a monster truck that raced on the USHRA circuit and for other promoters. Black Stallion started out as a stock 1982 Ford F250 back in 1982, owned and modified by Michael Vaters.

The first modification was a homemade 12" lift kit, since such kits were unavailable at the time. Mike then later added two sunroofs, an Alpine stereo system, a Ford 460 Engine, Rockwell 5 ton toploaders, Clark 20 ton planetaries, 66" terra tires, a 9" television and later on, a 1988 Ford F series front end. Between 1990 and 1991, Mike realized the future of monster trucks, which was racing. To be competitive, Mike replaced the leaf springs with airbags, the old heavy split ring rims with lightweight one piece rims, fiberglass body pieces, cutting the tires, gutting the interior out, 4 linking the truck and putting in a bigger engine. The modifications proved to be beneficial to Mike, with close races with First Blood, and competing in some Pendaliner Special Events racing events. After a violent rollover in Bloomsburg Pennsylvania in 1991, Mike decided to put King shocks on the truck, which he later added coil springs in 1992. Along with the coil springs, Mike also removed the airbags. Mike is credited as the first owner to use bypass shocks. Also for 1992, Mike changed the front clip to a 1992 Ford F-series front end.

Mike rarely ran this truck after he built the popular Boogey Van in 1993, driven by his then wife, Pam Vaters. Due to this, the truck was nicknamed Rodney, after the comedian, Rodney Dangerfield. Mike then built a truck for the 1996 season for research and development, named Black Stallion 2000, since his crew members joked about Mike not building a new truck for himself until the new millennium. This chassis is still running strong to this day.

For his 20th anniversary, Mike decided to repaint Black stallion, with the front of the truck yellow, going into black with a horse face painted on. The truck currently has the same paint scheme. The drivers for 2016 are Michael Vaters & Matt Cody. Vaters will compete in the Fox Sports 1 Championship Series. Cody will travel to Birmingham, Toronto, Newark, Charleston, Columbia, Worcester, Wheeling & Baton Rouge.

== World Finals Appearances ==
=== Monster Jam World Finals ===
- 2001
1. Driver: Michael Vaters
2. Racing: Lost to Wolverine in Round 1
3. Freestyle: Scored 30 - Sixth
- 2002
1. Driver: Michael Vaters
2. Racing: Lost to Grave Digger in Round 1
3. Freestyle: Scored 32 - Fourth
- 2003
1. Driver: Michael Vaters
2. Racing: Lost to Gun Slinger in Round 1
3. Freestyle: Scored 30 - Fifth
- 2005
1. Driver: Michael Vaters
2. Racing: Lost to Destroyer in Round 1
3. Freestyle: Scored 27 - Tied King Krunch for Third
- 2008
1. Driver: Michael Vaters
2. Racing: Lost to Airforce After Burner in Round 2
3. Freestyle Scored 25 - Ninth

== See also ==
- Monster Truck
- List of Monster Trucks
