= Captain's Curse =

2007 monster truck

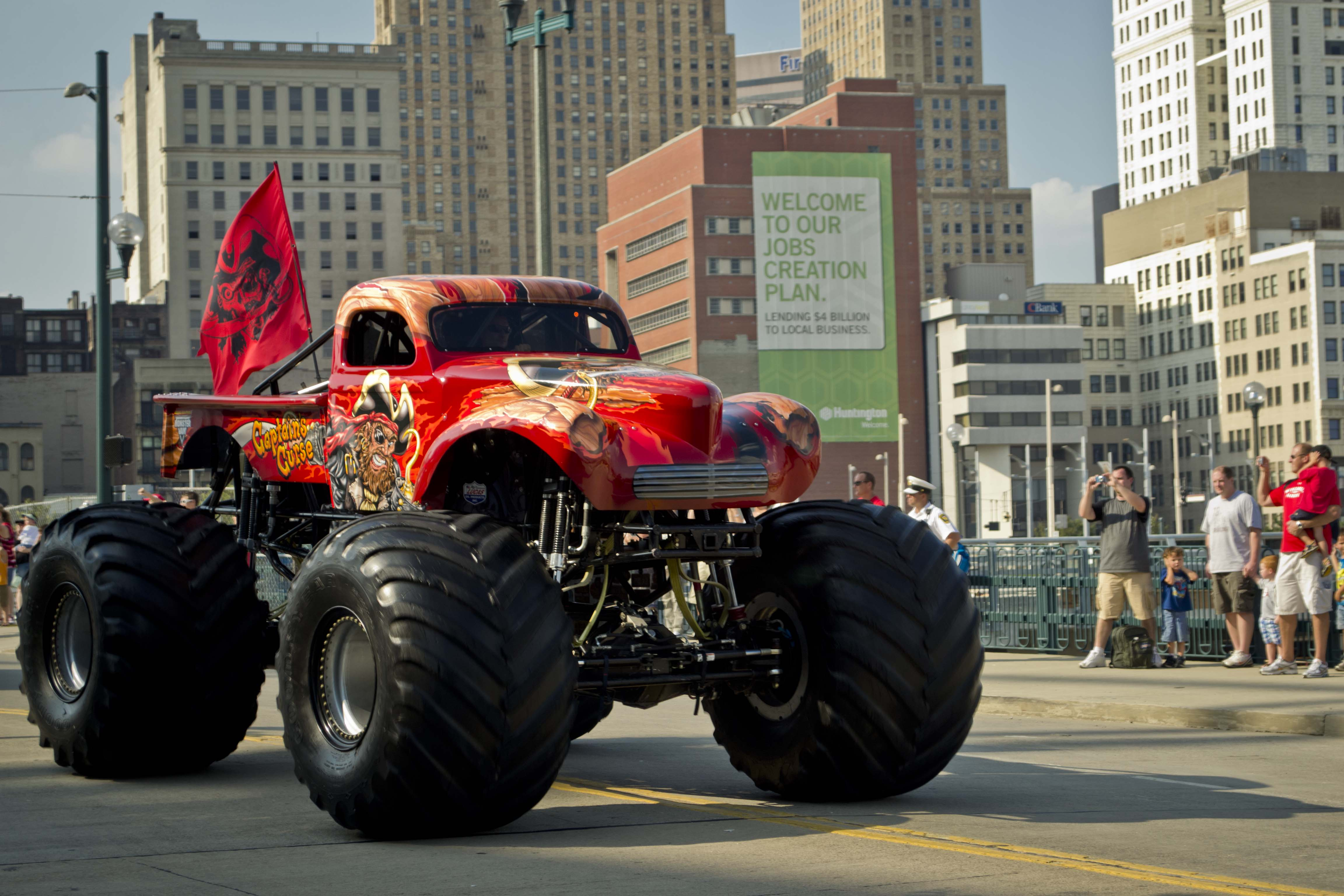

Owner and driver information
- Owner: FELD Motorsports
- Driver(s): Alex Blackwell, Pablo Huffaker (2007 and 2012 World Finals)
- Home city: Aurora, Illinois

Truck information
- Year created: 2001 (as Blacksmith), 2007 (as Captain's Curse)
- Body style: 1941 Willys Pickup
- Chassis: Patrick Enterprises Incorporated (PEI)
- Engine: 540 cubic inch Merlin big block
- Transmission: Coan 2-speed

Captain's Curse (formerly Blacksmith) was a monster truck created by Monster Jam and FELD Motorsports, and competed in the Monster Jam series from 2007 through 2016.

Captain's Curse was first seen in 2007 driven by Pablo Huffaker at Monster Jam World Finals 8. Alex Blackwell then drove the truck for the next five years until moving to Wolverine in 2012.

Styled after a 1941 Willys pickup, the truck originally featured a red-and-black pirate-themed paint scheme. Designed to replace the Blacksmith monster truck, the truck's debut at World Finals 8 was an immediate success, with driver Pablo Huffaker winning his first Monster Jam World Finals freestyle championship behind the wheel of Captain's Curse. Alex Blackwell later took over as driver of the truck with a different chassis, experiencing similar success. At World Finals X, the truck reached the final round in racing against Maximum Destruction. However, the truck lost its brakes during the run, causing the truck to flip violently when Blackwell attempted to steer it. The truck eventually landed several rows in the stands of Sam Boyd Stadium, although no one was injured. After that incident, the truck got a brand new PEI chassis, debuting at Old Bridge Township RACEWAY PARK on May 30, 2009. Ever since then, the truck and driver combo has bought consistent success. In 2012, the truck was temporarily retired, as driver Alex Blackwell was assigned to drive the new version of Wolverine. The truck made a return at the Advance Auto Parts MONSTER JAM World Finals 13 in March 2012, with its original driver Pablo Huffaker behind the wheel. In the 2013 season, Captain's Curse debuted a new black paint scheme, with Blackwell returning behind the wheel. In 2016, a successor named Pirate's Curse debuted, however, the two trucks competed alongside each other for the beginning of the year, with Blackwell eventually moving to Megalodon. Captain's Curse has since been retired from competition.

== Monster Jam World Finals results ==
=== Blacksmith: 2001–2006 ===
2001
Driver – Pablo Huffaker
Racing – Defeated Lyle Hancock in Blue Thunder in Round 2, but flipped into the dumpsters after the run.
Freestyle – 27, Pablo drove Ragin' Steel in Freestyle due to Blacksmith flipping into the dumpsters in Racing.
2002
Driver – Pablo Huffaker
Racing – Defeated by Jimmy Creten In Bounty Hunter in the Semi-Finals.
Freestyle – 35
2003
Driver – Carl Van Horn
Racing – Defeated by Jimmy Creten in Bounty Hunter in the Semi-Finals.
Freestyle – 24
2004
Driver – Pablo Huffaker
Racing – Defeated by Dennis Anderson in Grave Digger in the Finals.
Freestyle – 26
2005
Driver – Pablo Huffaker
Racing – Defeated by Dennis Anderson in Grave Digger in the Quarter-Finals.
Freestyle – 18
2006
Driver – Pablo Huffaker
Racing – Defeated by Jimmy Creten In Bounty Hunter in the Semi-Finals.
Freestyle – 13

=== Captain's Curse: 2007–2016 ===
2007
Driver – Pablo Huffaker
Racing – Defeated by Dennis Anderson in Grave Digger in the Semi-Finals.
Freestyle – 34
2008
Driver – Alex Blackwell
Racing – Defeated by John Seasock in Batman in the Semi-Finals.
Freestyle – 29
2009
Driver – Alex Blackwell
Racing – Defeated by Tom Meents in Maximum Destruction in the Finals (Flipped into Stands in the run).
Freestyle – (DNR-Broke)
2010
Driver – Alex Blackwell
Racing – Defeated by Steve Sims in Stone Crusher in Round 1.
Freestyle – 9 (Broke the Front Steering on the first hit)
2011
Driver – Alex Blackwell
Racing – Defeated by Tom Meents in Maximum Destruction in Round 2.
Freestyle – 10
2012
Driver – Pablo Huffaker
Racing – Defeated by Alex Blackwell in Wolverine in Round 2.
Freestyle – 15
2013
Driver – Alex Blackwell
Racing – Defeated by Steve Sims in Stone Crusher in Round 2.
Freestyle – 19
2014
Driver – Alex Blackwell
Racing – Defeated by Adam Anderson in Grave Digger The Legend in Round 2.
Freestyle – 22.5
2015
Driver – Alex Blackwell
Racing – Defeated by Tom Meents in Max-D in Round 1
Freestyle – 15.5

== See also ==
- List of Monster Trucks
