= Lucas Oil Pro Pulling League =

American professional truck and tractor pulling series

- Category: Tractor and Truck Pulling
- Official website: www.propulling.com

The Pro Pulling League, now known as the Pro Pulling League, (sometimes abbreviated as PPL) is an American professional truck and tractor pulling series featuring Super Modified Tractors as well as Pro Modified Four-Wheel Drive Trucks, Super Modified Two-Wheel Drive Trucks, Pro Stock Tractors, Super Farm Tractors, Super Stock Diesel Trucks, Lightweight Super Stock Tractors, Unlimited Super Stock Tractors, and hot rod Semis on their national "Champions Tour." It bills itself as "...showcasing the most extreme vehicles and the most talented pulling drivers in the world." It has been described as the "premiere pulling series" in the United States.

== History ==
Lucas Oil began their foray into American pulling when they became the title sponsor for the now-absorbed American Tractor Pullers Association in 2003 when it became known as the ATPA Lucas Oil Pulling Series. Forrest Lucas, the founder of Lucas Oil, created the PPL in 2005 after the ATPA folded soon after Lucas Oil's initial sponsorship.

== Reorganization of the Pro Pulling League ==
Lucas Oil discontinued ownership and operation in November 2022. In 2023 the Pro Pulling League emerged under new ownership with Lucas Oil returning in a sponsorship role. Now based in Sellersburg, Indiana, the Pro Pulling League is in its 19th year and the largest pulling organization in the world, with 300 events held by the organization and its member-states.

== Rules ==
Rules in the PPL are similar to other pulling leagues.

== Participants ==
Competitors compete for cash purses in four series: Champion Tour, Silver Series, Midwest Region, and Western Series. There are no full-time pulling teams in the League, only hobbyists (sometimes serious) who are "trying to have as much fun as possible." Many of the pullers in the league are associated with the automotive or farming businesses, and some come from unique unrelated fields, such as dentistry. As of 2016, the PPL has over twenty classes of pulling vehicles one can participate in. As of 2016, direct family members of registered PPL pullers who are graduating high school seniors are eligible for college scholarships.

== Pro Pulling League in Media ==
The Pro Pulling League has a wide presence in digital media. The PPL offers pulling content through their in-house live streaming service, Pro Pulling TV and broadcast partners MAVTV and CBS. The PPL also utilizes popular social media outlets such as YouTube, Facebook, Instagram, Tik Tok, and X In 2013, PPL announced the creation of its own magazine titled, Pro Pulling Magazine. The magazine went on indefinite hiatus when Lucas Oil discontinued ownership.
