= John Seasock =

Monster truck driver (born 1965)

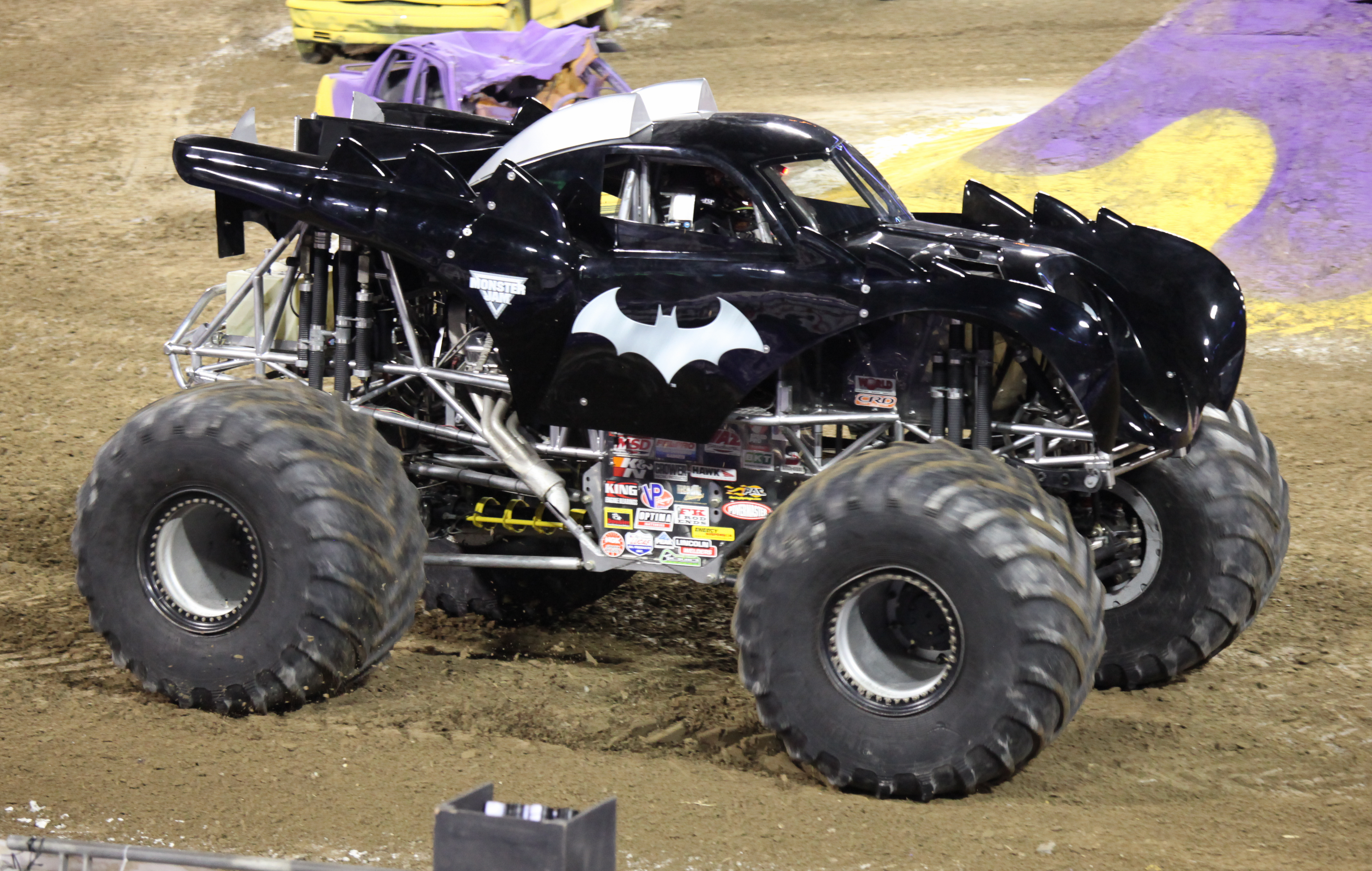
- Batman, performing in 2014

Personal information
- Nationality: American
- Born: July 3, 1965 (age 60)

Sport
- Country: United States
- Sport: Monster Jam
- Team: Batman
- Retired: 2016

Achievements and titles
- World finals: Racing: 2007, 2008

John Michael Seasock (born July 3, 1965) is a retired professional monster truck driver. He competed on the USHRA circuit with his truck, Batman, where it was the 2007 and 2008 Monster Jam World Racing Champion. He last drove Grinder sponsored by Advance Auto Parts.

== Career ==
Seasock began his interest in monster trucks when he saw Bigfoot at the Philadelphia Spectrum. In 1990 he became a full-time driver with his first Sudden Impact, a red Ford F-150 which was leaf-sprung.

In the middle of the 1990s, Seasock drove for several teams, including a stint in the Devil's Dodge truck, before buying the Storm Warning vehicle and renaming it to Sudden Impact. It was the first truck to sport the recognisable teal paint scheme.

He continued in that truck until 1999 when he purchased the Liquidator from Bob Fisher and also renamed it Sudden Impact. This truck went through several revisions and paint schemes through its lifespan. It also brought Seasock to stardom on the USHRA Monster Jam circuit, helping him receive four World Finals berths and become one of the more well-known truck/driver combinations in the series. He also worked as a part-time driver for Mike Welch Motorsports, driving Pirate Pete.

In 2004 Seasock's team became a part of Chiller Motorsports to form Sudden Impact Racing. Seasock stepped aside from Sudden Impact and climbed into T-Maxx, splitting up a combination known to fans for many years.

Seasock returned to Sudden Impact for the 2006 winter season, but left the team in April. He has since joined Live Nation, and had been driving various trucks for them, including Team Suzuki, El Toro Loco, and Inferno. For the 2007 winter season, he became the driver of Batman. In this truck, Seasock scored the biggest win of his career as he won the 2007 Monster Jam Racing Championship. In 2008, he repeated the feat, becoming only the second back-to-back racing champion.

== Trademarks ==
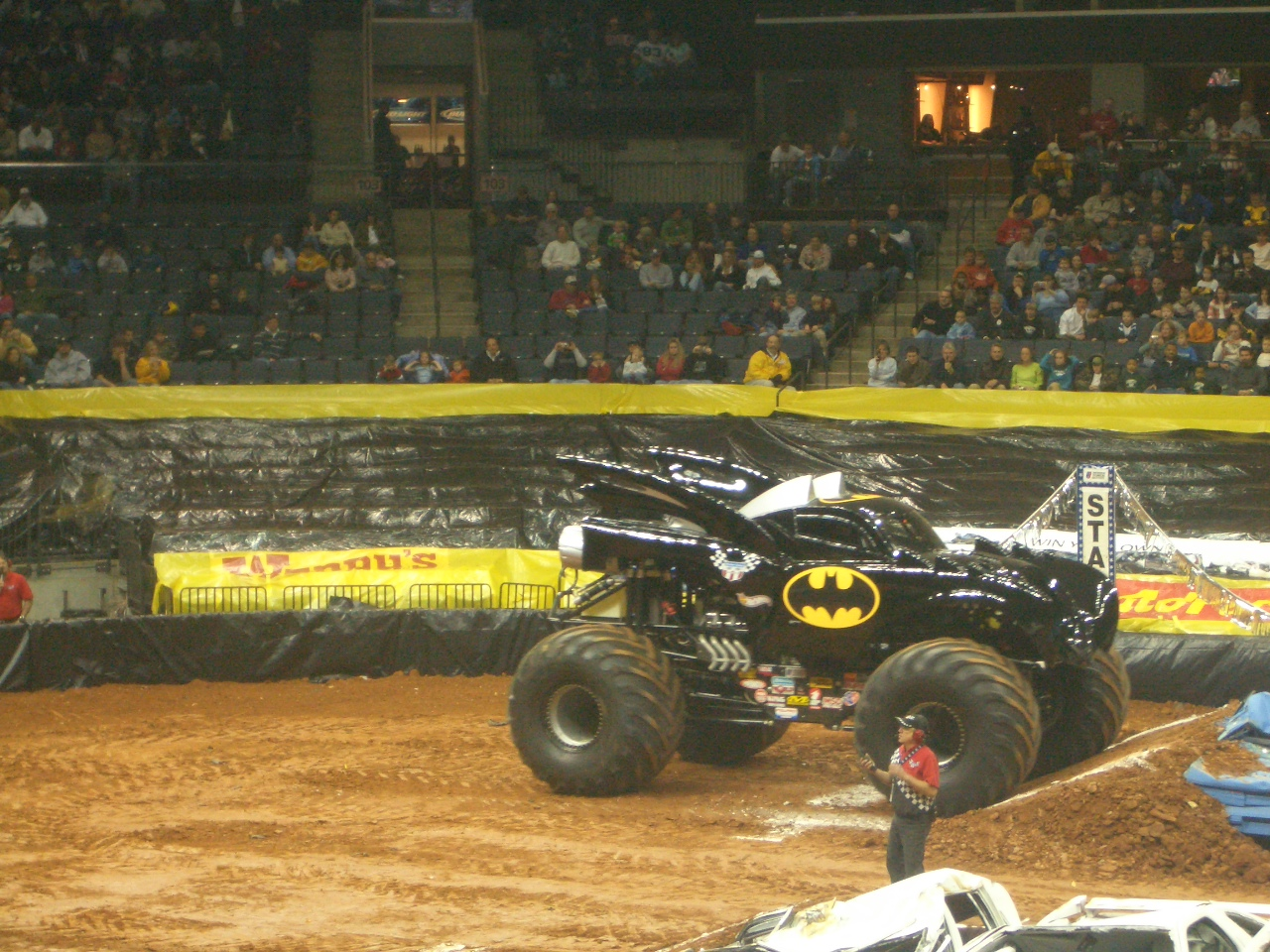
Batman making its debut in Charlotte, North Carolina.

Seasock's freestyles have a high rate of momentum but are more controlled and do not feature many unconventional hits. Despite this, Seasock often relies on big jumps, slap wheelies and donuts to receive consistent high scores. Seasock's signature freestyle move is the "roof walk", which involves him standing on the roof of the truck and acknowledging the fans while the truck is still in motion.

Off the track, Seasock is well known for his fan interaction, including attending weekly chat sessions on his team's website. He is also an avid street bike rider.

== Awards ==
- Monster Truck Racing Association (MTRA) Sportsman of the Year: 1997, 1998, 2000
- USHRA Sportsman of the Year: 2001
- MTRA Most Improved Team: 1999
- MTRA Safety Award: 2000
- USHRA World Finalist: 2000, 2001, 2002, 2003, 2007, 2008, 2009, 2010
- USHRA Monster Jam Racing Champion: 2007, 2008
