= Blue Thunder (truck) =

Monster truck

- Blue Thunder in Stafford Springs, CT at Stafford Motor Speedway

Owner and driver information
- Owner: Monster Jam/Feld Motorsports/Feld Entertainment
- Driver(s): Various

Truck information
- Year created: 2001 (original), 2013 (revival)
- Body style: 2010 Ford F-150
- Chassis: Carroll Racing Development (CRD)
- Engine: 540 C.I. Merlin (big block, blown, methanol injected)
- Transmission: 2-speed Coan
- Tires: BKT 66"x43"x25"

Blue Thunder was a monster truck that raced in the USHRA Monster Jam series. It was originally sponsored by the truck division of Ford Motor Company and Live Nation. The truck has several similarities with the monster truck Bigfoot. Some fans saw Blue Thunder as a replacement for Bigfoot in the Monster Jam series. The truck has been moderately successful and won several major events during its existence. However, it has not yet won a championship. Blue Thunder was used by Ford Motor Company for promotional purposes along with competition. The truck is currently driven by Various Drivers. The truck did not compete in 2012 when Todd LeDuc moved to Metal Mulisha after driving Blue Thunder in 2011, but during the 2022 Monster Jam Season, he began driving Blue Thunder again due to the Monster Energy truck being retired. With Ford dropping its sponsorship in 2012, the truck was redesigned and brought back in 2013 with veteran driver Dan Evans; former owner/driver of the Destroyer monster truck.

== Truck history ==
Ford Motor Company teamed up with Live Nation to create a monster truck that would highlight its "Ford Tough" campaign. The body style would be based on the F series Ford pickup with the body style being changed with each model year. Patrick Chassis was chosen to construct the chassis for Blue Thunder. The drive line consists of a Merlin 540ci blown & injected engine with a Dedenbear two speed automatic transmission. This setup has caused some controversy, as Merlin engines are based on the Big Block Chevrolet. The tires on Blue Thunder are 66" Goodyear Terra Tires. Construction of two trucks with the "Blue Thunder" name were completed. The debut of Blue Thunder was January 6, 2001, at the Houston Astrodome in Houston, Texas. Since its debut, it has placed in the finals every year. It performs at more than 20 events per year and is displayed at various promotional events. It also has been licensed for various toys and for several video games.

== Drivers ==
=== Former Drivers ===
- George Balhan (2003-05)
- Tony Farrell (2002-2009, deceased)
- Lee O'Donnell (on one occasion in 2008)
- Dan Rodoni (one Event in Canada in 2014)
- Dalton Millican (2015, deceased)
- Lyle Hancock (2001-2003)
- Chris 'Thunder n Lightning" Dadaian (2 events in Milwaukee in 2001)
- Norm Miller (2005-07)
- Bobby Zoellner
- Mike Wine (2007, 2008)
- Linsey Weenk (2008-10)
- Frank Krmel (2009-10)
- Dan Evans (2013-14)
- Pablo Huffaker (World Finals 14)
- Tyler Menninga (2016)
- Alx Danielsson (2017)
- Rhianna Buchanan (2017)
- Matt Cody (2017-2020)
- Todd LeDuc (2011,2022)
- Chelsea VanCleave (2023)

When the Blue Thunder debuted in 2001, Lyle Hancock was the primary driver. Through the years, Norm Miller, Bobby Zoellner, George Balhan and Tony Farrell have also been drivers. In July 2007, it was announced that Linsey Weenk of CSK Motorsports joined Live Nation Motorsports to drive Blue Thunder. He debuted at Monsters on Mainstreet in Kankakee, IL Speedway. In 2011 after ford left FELD motorsports, Todd LeDuc was announced the new driver where he would drive it for one season and win a SPEED TV event, but has returned again as of 2022, due to his previous truck, Monster Energy, discontinued in November 2021. After taking a year off it was brought back with veteran driver Dan Evans behind the wheel. Dalton Millican was competing in the #MoreMonsterJam tour with 7 other drivers in arenas across the country. Dalton Millican died on August 12, 2015, of a single-vehicle motorcycle crash at age 22.

The most recent event the truck has run at was on July 2, 2023 in Dresden, Germany, the truck has not run since then.

As of 2024, the truck has not been scheduled for any events. Due to the truck not running in a year, it's been placed into an indefinite hiatus.

Due to The truck not being mentioned or featured in any Monster Jam events during the 2024 season it's been highly speculated that the truck has been permanently retired.

== Awards ==
=== Monster Jam World Finals ===
- 2001
1. Driver: Lyle Hancock
2. Racing: Lost to Goldberg in the Finals
3. Freestyle: N/A
- 2002
1. Driver: Lyle Hancock
2. Racing: N/A *Broke after intros.*
3. Freestyle: Scored 35 - Tied for Third
- 2003
1. Driver: Lyle Hancock
2. Racing: Lost to Madusa in Round 1
3. Freestyle: Scored 34 - Third
- 2004
1. Driver: Tony Farrell
2. Racing: Lost to Blacksmith in Round 2
3. Freestyle: Scored 9 - Three Way Tie Last
- 2005
1. Driver: Tony Farrell
2. Racing: Lost to Bounty Hunter in Quarter-Finals
3. Freestyle: Scored 31 Tied First Place With Bounty Hunter. Scored 36, Second Place, In Tie breaker
- 2006
1. Driver: Tony Farrell
2. Racing: Lost to Taz in Round 2
3. Freestyle: Scored 24 - Sixth
- 2007
1. Driver: Tony Farrell
2. Racing: Lost to Monster Mutt Round 2
3. Freestyle: Scored 21 - Three way tie Tenth
- 2008
1. Driver: Linsey Weenk
2. Racing: Lost to Bounty Hunter in Round 2
3. Freestyle: Scored 30 - Tied Grave Digger for fourth
- 2009
1. Driver: Linsey Weenk
2. Racing: Lost to Captain's Curse in Semi-Finals
3. Freestyle: Scored 28 - Fourth
- 2010
1. Driver: Linsey Weenk
2. Racing: Lost to Maximum Destruction in Semi-Finals
3. Freestyle: Scored 25 - Tied Iron Man and Avenger for fifth
- 2013
1. Driver: Pablo Huffaker
2. Racing: Lost To Grave Digger The Legend In Round 3
3. Freestyle: Scored 30 - Second
- 2022
1. Driver: Todd Leduc
2. Racing: Lost To Black Pearl In Round 2
3. 2 Wheel Skills Scored 6.321 - Sixth
4. High jump 32.732 - Seventh
5. Freestyle: Scored 7.981 - Sixth

== Similar Trucks ==
There was also an earlier monster truck under the same name campaigned by Kevin Dabney and Kirk Dabney which had a Camaro body and raced in the 1980s. The two vehicles are unrelated although the name of the current truck may have been derived from the earlier vehicle.

== See also ==
- Monster Truck
- List of Monster Trucks
