= Motorsport in Illinois =

There has been auto racing in Illinois for almost as long as there have been automobiles. Almost every type of motorsport found in the United States can be found in Illinois. Both modern and historic tracks exist in Illinois, including NASCAR's Chicagoland Speedway and Gateway International Speedway. Notable drivers from Illinois include Danica Patrick, Tony Bettenhausen, and Fred Lorenzen.

== Types of auto racing ==
=== Stock car racing ===
National stock car racing touring series (such as NASCAR Cup, ARCA, NASCAR O'Reilly Auto Parts Series, and Craftsman Truck Series) race mainly on 4 tracks in Illinois: Chicagoland Speedway, near Chicago, Gateway Motorsports Park, near St. Louis, and the mile dirt tracks at the Illinois State Fairgrounds in Springfield and the DuQuoin State Fairgrounds near Du Quoin, Illinois.

Asphalt stock car racing is more prevalent in the northern part of Illinois with such tracks as Rockford Speedway or Grundy County Speedway. These tracks hold weekly racing programs, with Rockford's racing sanctioned by NASCAR's Local Racing Series. Regional to nationally known touring series, such as ARTGO and Mid American Stock Car Series have held special events these at both of these tracks.

=== Drag racing ===
Drag racing is fairly popular throughout Illinois, with both 1/4 and 1/8 mile tracks being found in the state. There are several National points events held in Illinois, as well as local weekly drag racing.

=== Off-road racing ===
Off-road racing can be found at temporary tracks at Route 66 Raceway to the permanent facilities at Lincoln Trail Motorsports Park.

=== Motorcycle racing ===
Motorcycle racing is held on permanent road-courses in northern Illinois, as well as motocross and hill climbs throughout the state. One of the most well-known motorcycle races in the U.S. can be found at the Illinois State Fairgrounds 1-mile (1.6 km) oval track.

=== Sports car racing ===
Several tracks host sports car racing in Illinois, although it is not prevalent with few road courses such as Blackhawk Farms Raceway.

=== Dirt oval racing ===
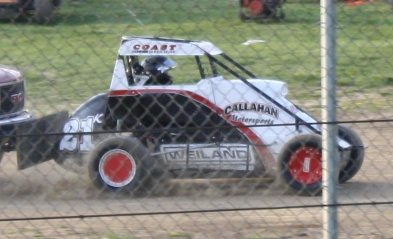
An Illinois Racing Series (IRS) midget car getting a push start

Dirt track racing on oval circuits is probably one of the most prevalent forms of motorsports in Illinois. Track sizes vary from the short and tight 1/5 mile Macon Speedway to the 1-mile (1.6 km) ovals at Springfield and DuQuoin. The Illini Racing Series (IRS) races midget and dwarf cars at various tracks in northern Illinois plus Angell Park Speedway in Wisconsin.

=== Karting ===
Kart racing can be found throughout Illinois on both dirt and asphalt.

== Notable tracks ==
=== Springfield Mile, Springfield ===
The one mile (1.6 km) dirt Illinois State Fairgrounds Racetrack in Springfield has had a long and varied past. Since before the inception of USAC, there have been Midgets, Sprints, and Silver Crown races at the "Monster Mile." The first incarnation of the track ran east–west. It now is raced north–south orientation. The Allen Crowe Memorial 100, named in honor of the Springfield resident, is held there every year during the Illinois State Fair. The race originated following the popular driver's death in 1963. USAC's Stock Car division sanctioned the race from 1963 until they ceased operations in 1984. The 1983 and 1984 races were co-sanctioned between ARCA and USAC. ARCA now sanctions this popular race. Until recently, the mile has hosted the United Midwestern Promoters UMP Fall Nationals for UMP Late Models. In the past, the mile has also hosted races sanctioned by the World of Outlaws. Many. many notable names have raced and won here, including Mario Andretti, A. J. Foyt, Davey Allison, and Benny Parsons. The "Monster Mile" also hosts some of the most well-known flat track motorcycle races in the U.S. The AMA sanctioned races are held every May and September, and draw motorcycle enthusiasts from all over the country.

=== Chicagoland Speedway, Joliet ===
Chicagoland Speedway is Illinois' only Superspeedway. It hosts races for NASCAR, ARCA, and IndyCar on its 1½ mile tri-oval. Chicagoland Speedway is the sister track to Route 66 Raceway, which boasts a 1/4-mile NHRA sanctioned dragstrip as well as a 1/2-mile dirt oval that has hosted World of Outlaws Late Models, Team Demolition Derbies, and off-road races sanctioned by CORR (at the time SODA).

=== Gateway International Raceway, Madison ===
Gateway Motorsports Park, located across the Mississippi River from St. Louis, Missouri, is another of Illinois' largest tracks. It host races sanctioned by NASCAR, IndyCar, USAC, and NHRA. Gateway's configuration is unique in the turns 3 & 4 have a larger radius than turns 1 & 2. It has been likened to NASCAR's Darlington Raceway. At 1¼ miles, it is just shorter than Darlington. The facility has a 1/4-mile NHRA sanctioned dragstrip.

=== Macon Speedway, Macon ===
One of the shortest tracks in Illinois, the 1/5-mile Macon Speedway has played host to some of most famous names in motorsports. Created in 1946, it is also one of the oldest continuous operating speedways in Illinois. Built on an old brick factory, it was known for years as "The Other Brickyard," in reference to the Indianapolis Motor Speedway being known as "The Brickyard." Macon Speedway was owned and operated by the Webb family for many years, but has changed hands many times in the last 20 years. The current owners are NASCAR stars Ken Schrader, Kenny Wallace, Tony Stewart, and local promoter Bob Sargent.

== Notable defunct tracks ==
=== Soldier Field, Chicago, Illinois ===
Soldier Field was the site of numerous races. A 1/4 mile board track was built, and the first two midget car races at the track in 1939 were won by Sam Hanks. The track was also used for motorcycle races. The board track was removed and it was changed to a half-mile dirt oval track. In 1956, NASCAR swung through for its only race at Soldier Field. Twenty-five cars started the 200-lapper, with Fireball Roberts averaging 61.037 mph (98.230 km/h) to win $850. The racetrack was torn out in 1970.

=== O'Hare Stadium, Schiller Park, Illinois ===
O'Hare Stadium, part of the Chicagoland racing scene for 12 years, was located just southwest of the corner of Mannheim and Irving Park Road in Schiller Park. The speedway, which operated between 1956 through 1968, was initially surrounded by farm fields and was situated just south of Chicago's famed O'Hare International Airport. NASCAR sanctioned the late model racing at O'Hare in 1960 and 1961. With property values rising, the track, which also featured cadet (sportsman), figure eight, Volkswagen and midget racing over the years, was demolished weeks after the final race program on September 7, 1968.

=== Joe Shaheen's Springfield Speedway, Springfield, Illinois ===
Not to be confused with the mile track in Springfield, this now-defunct track was famous in the racing world as "the place to go race after the fair." Many famous and notable race drivers would run the USAC races at the fairgrounds, then trek across town to Shaheen's track to do more battle. Its configuration changed a few times over the years, with its final configuration being a 3/8 mile clay oval.

=== Santa Fe Speedway, Willow Springs, Illinois ===
This track, southwest of Chicago, was home to many of Chicagoland's drivers. Originally built for horses, cars took over as the main attraction in the 1920s. Later that same decade, a tornado took out the original grandstands, and the track was closed. After World War II, two new tracks were built on the site. One was a 7/16-mile oval, the other a 1/4 mile oval. This configuration was operational from 1953, until the site was sold for development in 1995. On July 10, 1954, NASCAR's Grand National Division (now known as the NASCAR Cup Series) made a stop at Santa Fe Speedway for a 200 lap race. The race was won by #3, Dick Rathmann, in a 1954 Hudson Hornet. Over the years many famous names have raced there, including Benny Parsons, Cale Yarborough, David Pearson, Buddy Baker, Kyle Petty, Kenny Roberts, Ramo Stott and Tony Stewart.

Today, the site of this former track is home to a relatively upscale multi-family housing complex just south of 91st street in Burr Ridge, IL.

=== Meadowdale International Raceway ===
Meadowdale International Raceway was a road course located near Carpentersville, Illinois. It was used for motor racing from 1958 to 1968. Sanctioning bodies complained about its safety. It closed in 1968 in part from competition from other road courses in the regional (Road America and Blackhawk Farms Raceway).

== List of notable Illinois race car drivers ==
This is a list of race car drivers from Illinois that have raced in a major touring series, and have held a full-time position there. These series include NASCAR's Cup Series, Craftsman Truck Series, and O'Reilly Auto Parts Series, USAC Indy Cars, the IRL or Champ Car Series, ARCA, or one of the major off-road racing sanctioning bodies.

Other drivers include "Chicago Gang" midget car racing drivers Emil Andres and Jimmy Snyder (who won the pole position for the 1939 Indianapolis 500). Chicago-born Billy Arnold won the 1930 Indy 500. Another driver from Illinois was Shorty Cantlon, who was killed during the 1947 Indianapolis 500 in his 11th appearance in that race. Chicago-born Louis Disbrow competed in four Indy 500s.

| Name | Hometown | Racing Series |
|---|---|---|
| Justin Allgaier | Spaulding, Illinois | ARCA, NASCAR Cup Series, NASCAR Xfinity Series, NASCAR Craftsman Truck Series |
| Chuck Baird | Assumption, Illinois | IHRA |
| Gary Bettenhausen | Blue Island, Illinois | USAC Championship Car, NASCAR Cup Series, ARCA Menards Series |
| Merle Bettenhausen | Tinley Park, Illinois | USAC Championship Car |
| Tony Bettenhausen | Tinley Park, Illinois | AAA, USAC Championship Car, Formula 1 |
| Tony Bettenhausen Jr. | Joliet, Illinois | Champ Car, NASCAR Cup Series, Championship Auto Racing Teams |
| Joe Cooksey | Centralia, Illinois | ARCA, NASCAR Xfinity Series, NASCAR Craftsman Truck Series |
| Allen Crowe | Springfield, Illinois | USAC Championship Car |
| Bay Darnell | Lake Bluff, Illinois | USAC Stock Car, NASCAR Cup Series, ARCA Menards Series |
| Erik Darnell | Beach Park, Illinois | NASCAR Camping World Truck Series, NASCAR Cup Series, NASCAR Xfinity Series, ARCA Menards Series |
| Bob Dotter | Chicago, Illinois | NASCAR Xfinity Series, ARCA |
| Bobby Dotter | Chicago, Illinois | ASA, NASCAR Nationwide Series, NASCAR Camping World Truck Series, ARCA |
| Randy Eller | Taylorville, Illinois | CORR, WSORR |
| Steve Federico | Willmette, Illinois | CORR, WSORR |
| Lou Fegers | Glenview, Illinois | USAC, IMCA |
| Aaron Fike | Galesburg, Illinois | NASCAR Camping World Truck Series, ARCA |
| A. J. Fike | Galesburg, Illinois | NASCAR Camping World Truck Series |
| Steve Fossett | Chicago, Illinois | 24 hours of Le Mans, Paris to Dakar Rally |
| Rich Hayes | Springfield, Illinois | ARCA |
| Irv Hoerr | Peoria, Illinois | IMSA, NASCAR |
| Fred Lorenzen | Elmhurst, Illinois | NASCAR, USAC Stock Car |
| Phillip McGilton | Marion, Illinois | ARCA, NASCAR Camping World Truck Series |
| Danica Patrick | Roscoe, Illinois | Indy Racing League NASCAR Nationwide Series ARCA |
| Tony Schumacher | Long Grove, Illinois | NHRA |
| Eric Smith | Bloomington, Illinois | ARCA, UMP |
| Bob Strait | Mokena, Illinois | ARCA, ASA, NCTS, NASCAR Sprint Cup Series |
| Scott Taylor | Belvidere, Illinois | SODA, CORR, WSORR, Traxxas TORC Series |
| Bill Venturini (Retired) | Chicago, Illinois | ARCA |
| Billy Venturini | Chicago, Illinois | ARCA |
| Rich Vogler | Chicago, Illinois | USAC Sprint Cars, USAC Midgets |
| Mark Voigt | Marine, Illinois | NASCAR, ARCA, UMP |
| Bobby Wawak | Villa Park, Illinois | NASCAR, USAC Stock Car |
| Tim Wilkerson | Springfield, Illinois | NHRA |
| Steve Cannon | Danville, Illinois | USAC |
| Larry Cannon | Danville, Illinois | USAC |

== Other notable racing figures ==
| Name | Hometown | Series/Team/Notoriety |
|---|---|---|
| Drew Blickensderfer | Mt. Zion, Illinois | Crew Chief for Roush-Fenway Racing #17 |
| John Darby | Rockford, Illinois | NASCAR Sprint Cup Series Competition Director |
| Jan Gabriel | Palos Heights, Illinois | Announcer at Santa Fe Speedway, host of The Super Chargers Show, founder of Team Demo Association. Popularized "Sunday! Sunday! Sunday!" catchphrase in ads for U.S. 30 Drag Strip. |
| Mike Joy | (b)Chicago, Illinois | On-Air announcer for SPEED-TV, Fox Sports, and both the Motor Racing Network and the Indianapolis Motor Speedway Radio Networks. Formerly with CBS Sports. |
| Chad Knaus | Rockford, Illinois | Crew Chief for Hendrick Motorsports #48. Father was driver at Rockford, was his crew chief. |
| Rick Ren | Danville, Illinois | Kyle Busch Motorsports Director of Racing Operations |
| Wendy Venturini | (b)Chicago, Illinois | On-air personality for Speed-TV NASCAR Pre-race show. Daughter of Bill and sister of Billy. |
| Hal Pilger | Springfield, Illinois | Motorsports writer for The State Journal-Register newspaper. |

== Tracks in Illinois ==
=== Asphalt Oval ===
| Track name | Location | Length | Sanction | Program |
|---|---|---|---|---|
| Chicagoland Speedway | Joliet, Illinois | 1.5 Miles | NASCAR, ARCA, IRL, USAC | Major League auto racing. NASCAR Sprint Cup, ARCA Re/Max series, and the IRL all hold points races here. |
| Gateway International Raceway | Madison, Illinois | 1.25 Miles | No NASCAR Events in 2011 | |
| Grundy County Speedway | Morris, Illinois | 1/3 Mile | Unaffillated | Late Models, Mid-Am (unsanctioned), Street & Pure Stocks, STARS Midgets, Classic Modifieds, INEX Legends, CSR Super Cups, and Legacy Midwest Series |
| I-70 QMA | Greenville, Illinois | 1/10 Mile | QMA | QMA Quarter Midgets |
| Rockford Speedway | Loves Park, Illinois (Rockford) | 1/4 Mile | NASCAR | NASCAR Late Models, NASCAR Grand Nationals, NASCAR Short Trackers, NASCAR Road Runners, Winged Women on Wheels, National Figure 8 League, Hornets, Super Cups |

=== Dirt Oval ===
| Track name | Location | Length | Sanction | Program |
|---|---|---|---|---|
| Belle-Claire Speedway | Belleville, Illinois | 1/5 Mile | United Midwestern Promoters | UMP Late Models, Modifieds, Pro Modifieds, Pure Stocks, 600cc Micro Sprints, Midgets, Hornets |
| Bureau County Speedway | Princeton, Illinois | 3/8 Mile | United Midwestern Promoters | UMPLate Models, Modifieds, B-Modifieds, Street Stocks, Hornets |
| Charleston Speedway | Charleston, Illinois | 3/8 Mile | United Midwestern Promoters | UMP Modifieds, Super Streets, Hornets |
| Clay County Speedway | Flora, Illinois | 1/3 Mile | United Midwestern Promoters | UMP Modifieds |
| Faribury American Legion Speedway | Fairbury, Illinois | 1/4 Mile | United Midwestern Promoters | UMP Late Models, Modifieds and Sportsman |
| Fayette County Speedway | Brownstown, Illinois | 3/8 Mile | United Midwestern Promoters | UMP Modifieds, Sportsman |
| Farmer City Speedway | Farmer City, Illinois | 1/4 Mile | United Midwestern Promoters | UMP Late Models, Modifieds, Sportsman |
| Freeport Raceway Park | Freeport, Illinois | 1/2 Mile | Closed after the 2011 season | Late Models, Modifieds, B-Modifieds, Sportsman, Hobby Stock, Pure Stock, and Hornets |
| Highland Speedway | Highland, Illinois | 1/4 Mile | United Midwestern Promoters | UMP Late Models, Modifieds, Sportsman |
| Jacksonville Speedway | Jacksonville, Illinois | 3/8 Mile | | WoO Sprints, MOWA Sprints, 410 / 305 Sprints, Late Models, Modifieds, Midgets, Street Stock, Micros |
| LaSalle Speedway | LaSalle, Illinois | 1/4 Mile | United Midwestern Promoters | UMP Late Models, Modifieds, Street Stocks, & 4 Cyl. Hornets |
| Macon Speedway | Macon, Illinois | 1/5 Mile | United Midwestern Promoters | UMP Late Models, Sportsman, Hornets, Street Stocks, 600cc Micro Sprints, and CARS Late Models |
| Lincoln Speedway | Lincoln, Illinois | 1/4 Mile | United Midwestern Promoters | UMP Late Models, Modifieds, Sportsman |
| Peoria Speedway | Peoria, Illinois | 1/4 Mile | United Midwestern Promoters | Late Models, Sportsman, Modifieds, Street Stocks, Hornets |
| Quad City Speedway | East Moline, Illinois | 1/4 Mile | International Motor Contest Association | Late Models, IMCA Modifieds, A Modifieds, Street Stock, 4 Cylinders |
| Quincy Raceway | Quincy, Illinois | 1/4 Mile | | Late models, Modifieds, Hobby Stocks, Hornets |
| Shepp's Speedway | Alexander (New Berlin), Illinois | 1/4 Mile | United Midwestern Promoters | UMP Late models, UMP Sportsman, UMP Modifieds, UMP Street Stocks, |
| Spoon River Speedway | Banner (Southeast of Canton) | 3/8 Mile | United Midwestern Promoters | UMP Modified, UMP Pro Late Model, UMP Pro Modified, UMP 4-cyl |
| Southern Illinois Speedway | Marion, Illinois | 1/8 Mile | | Micro-sprints (High Banks Hustle, Terry Sprague Memorial) |
| Southern Illinois State Fairgrounds | DuQuoin, Illinois | 1 Mile | ARCA, USAC, AMA | ARCA Re/Max Series, USAC Midgets, Sprints, and Silver Crown, UMP Sportsman, AMA Grand National Flat Track. |
| Springfield Mile | Springfield, Illinois | 1 Mile | ARCA, USAC, AMA | ARCA Re/Max Series, USAC Midgets, Sprints, and Silver Crown, UMP Sportsman, AMA Grand National Flat Track. |

=== Drag Strips ===
| Track name | Location | Length | Sanction | Program |
|---|---|---|---|---|
| Gateway International Raceway | Madison, Illinois | 1/4 (.25) Mile | NHRA | NHRA National Series |
| Motion Raceway | Assumption, Illinois | 1,000 feet (300 m) | Unaffilliated | None. 2008 season never materialized, track remains closed. |
| Byron Dragway | Byron, Illinois | 1/4 Mile | IHRA | Super Pro, Pro, Street, Cycle, Jr. Dragster |
| Coles County Dragway | Charleston, Illinois | 1/8 Mile | NHRA | Super Pro, Pro, Street, Cycle, Jr. Dragster |
| Cordova Dragway Park | Cordova, Illinois | 1/4 Mile | NHRA | Top Eliminator, Modified, True Street, Super ET, Pro Bikes, Jr. Dragster |
| I-57 Dragstrip | Benton, Illinois | 1/8 Mile | NHRA | Super Pro, Pro, Footbrake, Trophy Street, King of the Street, Dixie Doorslammers, Outlaw Streetcars, Jr. Dragsters, and street bikes |
| MidState Dragway | Havana, Illinois | 1/8 Mile | NHRA | Super Pro, Pro, Street, Cycle, Jr Dragster |
| Route 66 Raceway | Joliet, Illinois | 1/4 Mile | NHRA | NHRA National Series |

=== Road Courses ===
| Track name | Location | Length | Sanction | Program |
|---|---|---|---|---|
| Autobahn Country Club | Joliet, Illinois | 1.5, 2.06, 3.56, and .8 miles (1.3 km) | SCCA, NASA | Various racing programs |
| Blackhawk Farms Raceway | South Beloit, Illinois | 1.95 miles (3.14 km) | SCCA, Midwestern Council, VSCDA, and SVRA | Various racing programs |
| Concept Haulers Motor Speedway | Norway, Illinois | Multiple tracks | WKA | Multiple classes |
| Gateway International Raceway | Madison, Illinois | 1.77 Mile | Unaffilliated | None at present time |
| Meadowdale International Raceway | Carpentersville, Illinois | 3.27 miles (5.26 km) | SCCA, USAC, AMA, karting | Various racing programs between 1958 and 1968, now a park |

=== Motocross Tracks ===
| Track name | Location | Length | Sanction | Program |
|---|---|---|---|---|
| Belleville Enduro Team | Belleville, Illinois | Multiple tracks | AMA | Various programs throughout the year |
| Motosports Park | Byron, Illinois | Multiple Tracks | AMA | Various programs throughout the year |
| Lincoln Trail Motosports | Casey, Illinois | Multiple tracks | AMA | Various programs throughout the year |
| South Fork Dirt Riders | Taylorville, Illinois | Multiple Tracks | AMA | Various programs throughout the year |
| Triple R Motocross | Nashville, Illinois | Multiple tracks | AMA | Various programs throughout the year |
