= Herald & Review 100 =

Annual auto race in Macon, Illinois

The Herald & Review 100 is a United Midwestern Promoters Late model auto race that is held annually at Macon Speedway, in Macon, Illinois.

== History ==
The Herald & Review 100 came about as a sponsor was needed for a big race that was to become a summertime staple at Macon Speedway. Local Promoter and track owner Wayne Webb succeeded in convincing the Herald & Review, a newspaper from Decatur, Illinois to put up part of the money to sponsor the race. The first incarnation of the race saw a record crowd attend to watch local favorite Butch Garner take the first checkered flag. The name "Herald & Review 100" was put on hold for a few years, as they dropped their sponsorship of the race. Recent years have seen the return of the "Herald & Review 100" As of the 2014 race, Shannon Babb of Moweaqua, Illinois now holds the record for most event wins with 5 Herald & Review 100 victories, which broke the tie held with Bob Pierce of Oakwood, Illinois and Kevin Weaver of Gibson City, Illinois with 4 wins. Only two father-son pairs have won the race, that being Dick (1988) and Matt (2000) Taylor, both of Springfield, IL as well as Danville, IL native Bob Pierce (1983, 1985, 1994, 2001) and Oakwood, IL resident Bobby Pierce (2016, 2017, 2021). Macon Speedway's second generation drivers (drivers whose fathers have raced there) have won the race 10 times. Joe Ross Jr. (twice), Matt Taylor, and Shannon Babb (5 times), and Bobby Pierce (3 times) are on that list.

== 2008 ==
Press release from Macon Speedway:

Kevin Weaver was one of the only cars brave enough to run the whole race on the high line, but the risk paid off. Weaver won his fourth Herald and Review 100. Dennis Erb led the race from lap 29, but a caution on lap 83 put Weaver right behind him. Erb's low line was no match for Weaver in the late stages of the race. Jason Feger finished in third place, running all night in the top three, but unable to grab the lead. Wes Steidinger started up front and led the first 29 laps, he finished in fourth. Brandon Sheppard, 15 years old, surprised many, passing half a dozen cars and local star Kyle Logue to grab fifth place. Logue ended up in sixth, running as high as fourth. Macon Speedway veteran Dick Taylor of Springfield, IL put up the fastest time in qualifying. Blue Mound, IL's Cory Daugherty had the fastest time until Taylor, the last qualifier of the day, set the fastest lap.

The Herald and Review 100 also brought the crowd some of the best heat races of the season. Three local favorites, Chris Dick, Jayme Zidar and Kyle Logue had a dogfight for the last heat win, with Zidar pulling into the lead on the final turn. Sullivan, IL's Rodney Standerder, Jason Feger (Bloomington, IL) and last year's Herald and Review 100 winner Wes Steidinger (Fairbury, IL) all took the checkered flag in their heats.

This year's race boasted a winners share of $6,000. It was also to be part of a $25,000 UMP Summer Nationals Series, which scheduled 27 races in 31 days. Since the race was rained out, and rescheduled to Saturday, August 16, 2008, the winners share could expand by $4,000. The 2008 "H&R 100" will be run in conjunction with a race previously scheduled to be run on August 16, and also as a make-up race for a previously rained-out Northern All-stars Late Model Series (NALMS) race. The previously scheduled race was called "The Big 10 Race Series". It was to award the winner $3,000, plus an additional $7,000 on the condition that the winner had raced at Macon Speedway 10 times previously in the 2008 season.

== Rain ==
Rain has been a familiar occurrence for fans of the Herald & Review 100. In 2005, rain pushed the start time back a few hours, and almost caused a riot in the pits between drivers and track officials over whether to run the race that night, or postpone it. Cooler heads prevailed, the track was ironed out to decent racing conditions, and the race was run, with a few of the drivers sitting out, or going home disagreeing with racing in the given conditions. Only 1 Summer Nationala regular, Rodney Melvin, had already loaded his car into his trailer, and was about to leave when news that the race would go ahead was passed around. He dropped the trailer door down and raced while all other tour regulars sat the event out in a form of silent protest. Joe Ross Jr. would go on to win this event. The 2015 event was rained out and ran in August, and this running produced another 1st time winner in Ryan Unzicker. Wes Steidinger did the same thing back in 2007.

== Herald & Review 100 Champions ==
Year	Winner	Hometown
1981	Butch Garner	Forsyth, Illinois
1982	Pete Willoughby	Columbus, Indiana
1983	Bob Pierce	Oakwood, Illinois
1984	Roger Long	Fithian, Illinois
1985	Bob Pierce	Oakwood, Illinois
1986 (Sanctioned by USAC)	Jim Leka	Illiopolis, Illinois
1987	Rick Standridge	Divernon, Illinois
1988	Dick Taylor	Springfield, Illinois
1989	Jim Leka	Illiopolis, Illinois
1990	Scott Bloomquist	Mooresburg, Tennessee
1991	Kevin Weaver	Gibson City, Illinois
1992	Kevin Weaver	Gibson City, Illinois
1993	Billy Moyer	Batesville, Arkansas
1994	Bob Pierce	Oakwood, Illinois
1995	Joe Ross, Jr	Springfield, Illinois
1996	Billy Drake	Bloomington, Illinois
1997	Ed Bauman	New Berlin, Illinois
1998	Ed Bauman	New Berlin, Illinois
1999 (UMP Summernationals 100)	Billy Drake	Bloomington, Illinois
2000 (UMP Summernationals 100)	Matt Taylor	Springfield, Illinois
2001 (UMP Summernationals 100)	Bob Pierce	Oakwood, Illinois
2002 (Featherlite Trailer 100)	Kevin Weaver	Gibson City, Illinois
2003 (95Q Behind the Pitwall 100)	Terry English	Benton, Kentucky
2004 (Herald & Review 100)	Don O'Neal	Martinsville, Indiana
2005	Joe Ross, Jr	Springfield, Illinois
2006	Shannon Babb	Moweaqua, Illinois
2007	Wes Steidinger	Fairbury, Illinois
2008	Kevin Weaver	Gibson City, Illinois
2009	Shannon Babb	Moweaqua, Illinois
2010	Dennis Erb Jr.	Carpentersville, Illinois
2011	Shannon Babb	Moweaqua, Illinois
2012	Brian Shirley	Chatham, Illinois
2013	Shannon Babb	Moweaqua, Illinois
2014	Shannon Babb	Moweaqua, Illinois
2015	Ryan Unzicker	El Paso, Illinois
2016	Bobby Pierce	Oakwood, Illinois
2017	Bobby Pierce	Oakwood, Illinois
2018	Gordy Gundaker	St. Charles, Missouri
2019	Gordy Gundaker	St. Charles, Missouri
2020	Brandon Sheppard	New Berlin, Illinois
2021	Bobby Pierce	Oakwood, Illinois
2022	Jason Feger	Bloomington, Illinois
2023	Ryan Unzicker	El Paso, Illinois
2024	Jason Feger	Bloomington, Illinois

- 1980-1989 results
- 1990-1997 results
- 1998-2007 results
- 2008-2024 results

1987-2024 results

== See also ==
- Racing in Illinois
