= Aaron Pierce =

Aaron Pierce may refer to:

- Aaron Pierce (24 character), a fictional character on the television series 24
- Aaron Pierce (American football) (born 1969), former professional American football player
- Aaron Pierce (racing driver) from Night of NASCAR stars
- Aaron Pearce in 2011–12 USHL season
