= Herald & Review =

Daily newspaper based in Decatur, Illinois

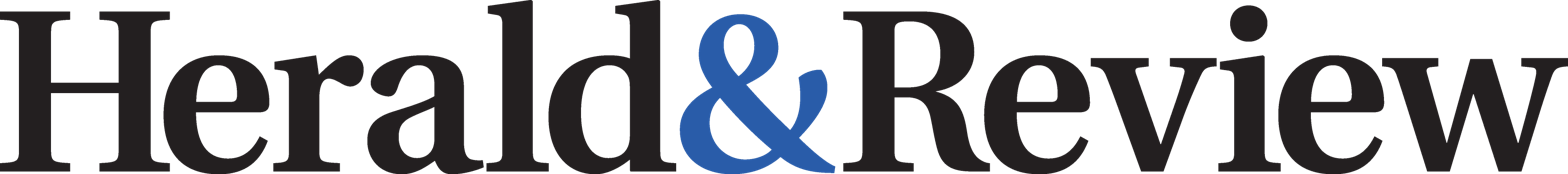
- Type: Daily newspaper
- Format: Broadsheet
- Owner: Lee Enterprises
- Editor: Allison Petty
- Deputy editor: Scott Perry
- Founded: April 1872; 154 years ago
- Headquarters: 225 South Main Street; Decatur, IL 62523
- Country: United States
- Circulation: 9,128 daily (as of 2023)
- OCLC number: 34924722
- Website: herald-review.com

The Herald & Review is a daily newspaper based in Decatur, Illinois. It is owned by Lee Enterprises.

The Herald & Review was named one of Editor & Publisher's "10 Newspapers That Do It Right" in 2019 for its use of government documents and public records to create substantive journalism.

In 2018, the Herald & Review was recognized by Editor & Publisher for digital growth and other initiatives. It also received top honors in the investigative reporting and public service categories in the Illinois Associated Press Media Editors 2017 newspaper contest.

The Herald & Review in August 2017 was one of 10 newsrooms chosen from across the country to receive a grant for watchdog training through Investigative Reporters and Editors Inc., a nonprofit organization dedicated to strengthening investigative journalism.

The Herald & Review also founded the Herald & Review 100, an auto race held annually at Macon Speedway, in Macon, Illinois.

== History ==
The Rev. Alfred F. Wuensch founded the Decatur Review as a weekly newspaper in April 1872. C.N. Walls founded the Daily Herald in 1878. In 1931, the morning Herald, by this time owned by the Lindsay family, and the evening daily, Decatur Daily Review, owned by the Schaub family, merged their operations. Both newspapers continued to publish separately while maintaining largely separate editorial staffs. The Lindsay-Schaub combine acquired other newspapers, including The Southern Illinoisan, the Champaign-Urbana Courier, the Edwardsville Intelligencer, the Metro-East Journal and the Midland Daily News, as well as Decatur radio station WSOY.

On July 13, 1937, 17 of the paper's editorial employees walked out and went on strike, forcing suspension of the paper, Decatur's only daily newspaper at the time.

The newspaper began operating at 601 E. William St. in 1976 and continued until 2022, when its headquarters moved to 225 S. Main St. in the heart of downtown Decatur.

In 1979, Lee Enterprises purchased most of the Lindsay-Schaub papers, including the Herald and Daily Review. The papers were renamed the Herald & Review and continued to publish morning and evening editions. In June 1982, the evening edition was discontinued.
