= Night of NASCAR stars =

"Night of NASCAR Stars" is a television special that was taped at Macon Speedway in 2007, and aired on Speed TV. It was held again on June 12, 2008, and was aired on Speed TV later in 2008.

== Background ==
The "Night of NASCAR Stars" was conceived as a promotional gimmick to get more racing fans to attend the races at Macon Speedway, in Macon, Illinois. Track co-owners Tony Stewart, Kenny Wallace and Ken Schrader invited fellow NASCAR drivers to their track for a special race of NASCAR drivers who would be racing borrowed UMP Modifieds. Many of which were re-skinned or wrapped to mimic the NASCAR driver's NASCAR race cars. The UMP Sportsman and UMP Street Stocks were also included in the night's racing action.

During an intermission in racing, track co-owner Tony Stewart phoned in a donation of $5,000 to the Victory Junction Gang Camp that was matched with donations from Macon Speedway, the Blue Mound Lions Club and the night’s 50/50 raffle winner for a total donation of $10,000. Northeast Community Fund Food Bank and Meridian School District also benefited from donations from Macon Speedway owners.

== 2007 ==
=== Drivers in attendance ===
Marcos Ambrose	Kyle Busch	Ray Evernham
Bobby Labonte	Jason Leffler	Stephen Leicht
Casey Mears	Aaron Pierce	David Reutimann
Ken Schrader	Kenny Wallace	Mike Wallace
Steve Wallace		J. J. Yeley

=== Results ===
	Heat race 1	Heat race 2		Feature (A-Main)		
1	Kenny Schrader	Jason Leffler	1	Kenny Wallace	8	Casey Mears
2	Kenny Wallace	Mike Wallace	2	Kenny Schrader	9	Steve Wallace
			3	Marcos Ambrose	10	Jason Leffler
			4	David Reutimann	11	Aaron Pierce
			5	Bobby Labonte	12	Ray Evernham
			6	Kyle Busch	13	Stephen Leicht
			7	Mike Wallace	14	J. J. Yeley

== 2008 ==
In addition to the racing program, a silent auction was held with the proceeds going to the Kyle Busch Foundation. The winner got a ride in Macon Speedway's 2-seat Late model, at speed, around Macon Speedway's 1/5-mile track with Kyle Busch doing the driving. The UMP Sportsman and UMP Street Stocks were also included in the night's racing action.

=== Stars in attendance (racing) ===
- Marcos Ambrose (#21 Little Debbie’s Ford/Wood Bros. Racing – NSC)
- Dave Blaney (#22 Caterpillar Toyota/Bill Davis Racing - NSC)
- Mike Bliss (#1 Miccosukee Resort Chevy/Phoenix Racing – NNS)
- Bobby Labonte (#43 Cheerios Dodge/Petty Enterprises - NSC)
- Michael McDowell (#00 Champion Mortgage Toyota/Michael Waltrip Racing - NSC)
- Buzzy Reutimann (retired, short-track legend & DIRT Hall of Famer)
- David Reutimann (#44 UPS Toyota/Michael Waltrip Racing - NSC)
- Ken Schrader (NASCAR & short track veteran will drive anything, fields cars for Jamie Hayes and Ricky Carmichael, owns 3 dirt tracks)
- David Stremme (#64 Atreus Homes Chevy/Rusty Wallace Racing – NNS)
- Kenny Wallace (#87 Furniture Row Chevy/Furniture Row Racing – NSC, co-owner of Macon Speedway)
- Mike Wallace (#7 GEICO Toyota/Germain Racing – NNS)
- Steve Wallace (#66 Jimmy John's Chevy/Rusty Wallace Racing – NNS)
- Josh Wise (#22 NAPA Auto Parts Dodge/Fitz Motorsports – NNS)

=== Stars in attendance (not racing) ===
- Kyle Busch (#18 M&M's Toyota/Joe Gibbs Racing – NSC)
- Bob Dillner (esteemed motorsports journalist and co-founder of Speed51.com short-track site)
- Michael Waltrip (#55 NAPA Auto Parts Toyota/Michael Waltrip Racing – NSC, President Michael Waltrip Racing)
- Russ Wallace (father of Rusty, Mike and Kenny Wallace, grandfather of Steve Wallace)
- Rusty Wallace (retired, TV broadcast personality, President Rusty Wallace Racing)

=== Results ===
	Heat race 1	Heat race 2		Feature (A-Main)		
1			1	Ken Schrader	6	Michael McDowell
2			2	Kenny Wallace	7	Mike Bliss
			3	Steve Wallace	8	Mike Wallace
			4	David Stremme	9	Josh Wise
			5	Buzzy Reutiman	10	Bobby Labonte

*(Results will be completed as soon as they are available)

== See also ==
- Macon Speedway
- Racing in Illinois
