= Chad Hord =

American racing driver

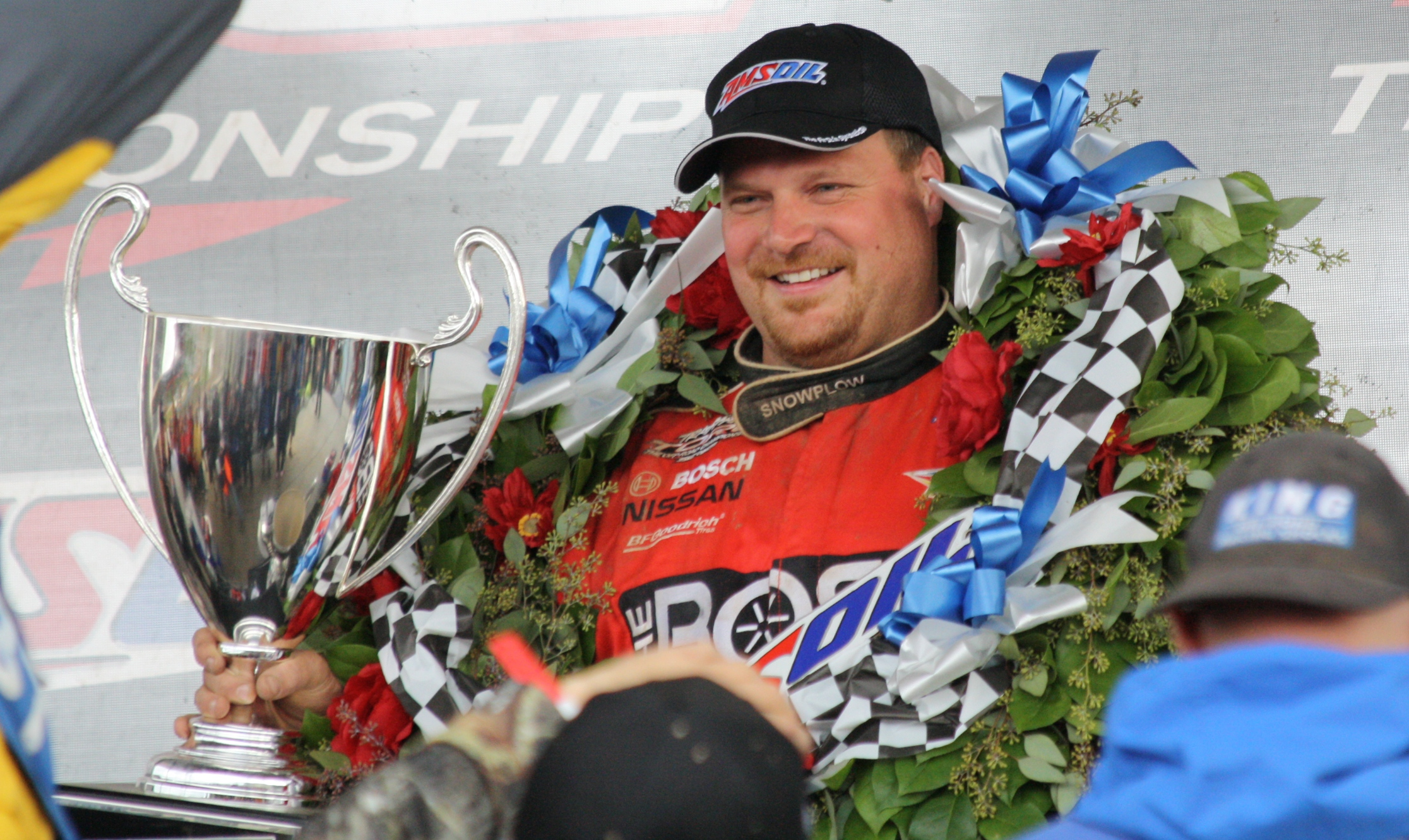
- Hord holding his 2011 AMSOIL Cup
- Nationality: American
- Born: August 21, 1976 (age 50) Iron Mountain, Michigan

Traxxas TORC Series Pro 2WD career
- Debut season: 2010
- Current team: Hord Off-Road Racing
- Fastest laps: 4 Oakley Bomb Awards

Championship titles
- CORR Super Buggy (2000); CORR Pro Lite (2006); WSORR Pro Light (2007)

Awards
- 2011: AMSOIL Cup
- Statistics up to date as of November 26, 2012.

Chad Hord (born August 21, 1976) is a professional American off-road racing driver from Felch, Michigan. As of 2012, he races a PRO 2 short course truck in the Traxxas TORC Series (TORC).

In 1995, he began racing in Short-course Off-road Drivers Association (SODA). The main sanctioning body for the Midwestern United States changed several times throughout his career; he raced in Championship Off-Road Racing (CORR), World Series of Off-Road Racing (WSORR) and Traxxas TORC Series (TORC). Hord won a championship in Super Buggy before turning professional and winning two championships in Pro Light.

In 2011, he became the third Pro 2 driver to win the AMSOIL Cup, the world championship race in short course off-road racing. He also won the Electric Production class at the Pikes Peak International Hill Climb that year. As of the 2012 racing season, he had won three series championships, 31 races (25 in professional truck categories), four world championship races, and 125 top five races in 169 pro truck starts.

== Background ==
Hord was born in Iron Mountain, Michigan to Ron and Marsha Hord and was raised in nearby Felch with two brothers(Chris and Brian Hord) and one sister(Sarah Fleming). He played on the football and track and field teams at North Dickinson County School. After graduating from North Dickinson County School in 1994, he attended the Bay de Noc Community College. He received a degree in Machine Tool, CAD, and became a certified welder.

== Racing career ==
=== 1990s ===
As a child, Hord attended off-road races at nearby Bark River International Off-Road Raceway and he played on dirt bikes / snowmobiles / and All-terrain vehicles. His parents bought him a SODA Super Buggy in 1995 and he continued to gain experience in the class as a hobby for the rest of the 1990s. He raced in the Class 9/10 class in 1995. To support his racing hobby, he worked at a machine tool shop, in the logging industry, and as a heavy equipment operator.

Championship Off-Road Racing (CORR) formed in 1998 and it immediately displayed SODA as the main sanctioning body in Midwestern off-road racing. Hord won his first race that season at Antigo, Wisconsin. He finished second in CORR Super Buggy, won the class world championship race at Crandon International Off-Road Raceway. In the following season, he again finished second in CORR Super Buggy and won the Unlimited Buggy class world championship race at Crandon.

=== 2000s ===
The owner of the heavy equipment company that he worked for also owned BOSS Snowplow. In 2000, BOSS began sponsoring Hord and the sponsorship ended up to be a long-term sponsorship agreement. Hord won his first championship in CORR Super Buggy by having consistent top five finishes that year. He moved to Pro Lite in 2001 after having six wins in 31 buggy races.

In his Pro Lite rookie season, he finished fourth in season points with ten Top Five finishes in sixteen races. The following year he ended up third in season points with eleven Top Five finishes in fourteen races. For 2003, he picked up sponsorship from Kumho Tires finishing with nine Top Fives in 13 races and third in the points. Nissan signed Hord Off-Road Racing as a factory team in 2004. Again he finished third in points with ten Top five finishes in thirteen starts.

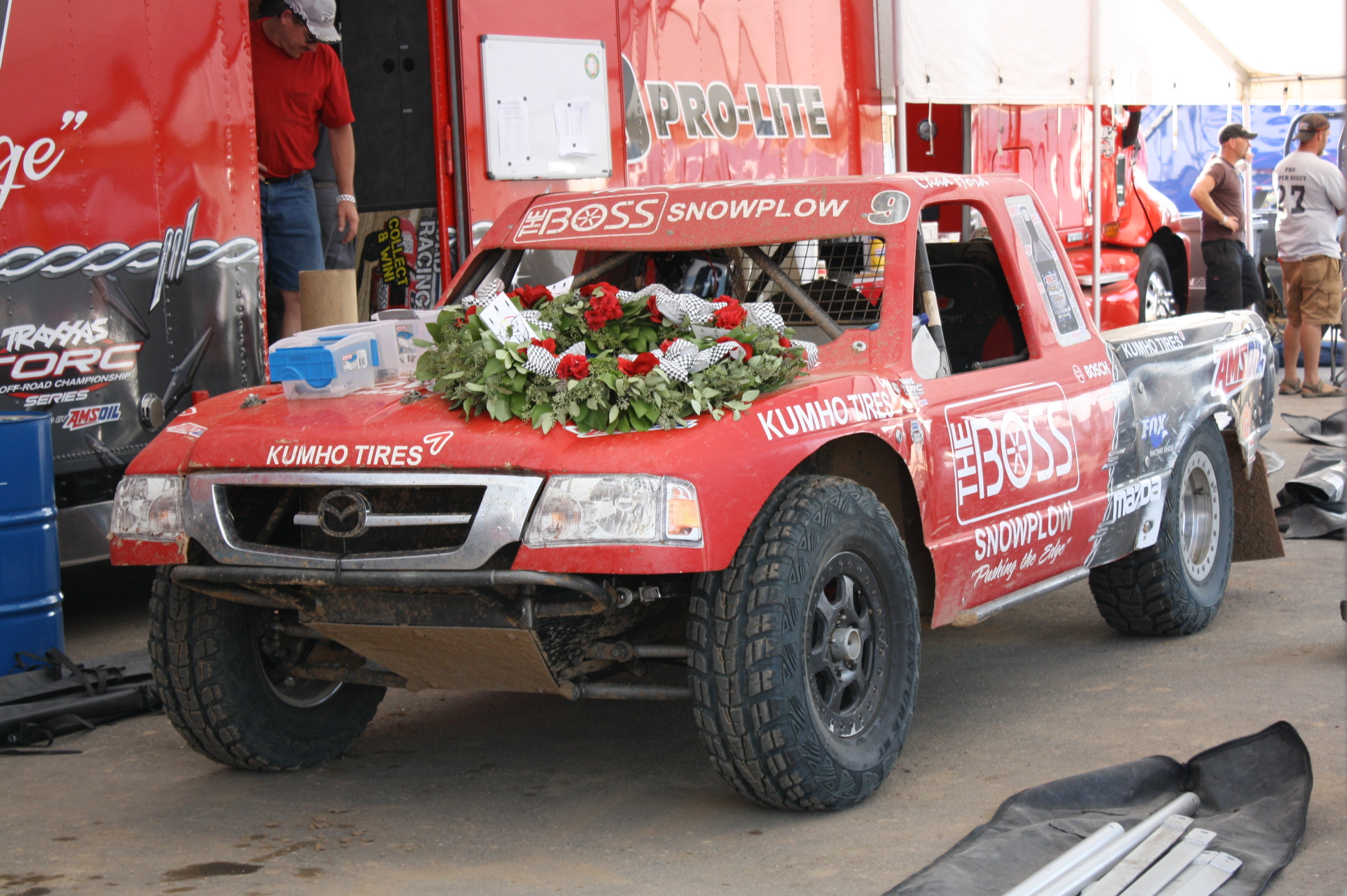
Hord's Pro Lite truck that won 2009 World Championship race at Crandon

Hord became a professional factory Nissan racing driver in 2005. Hord finished second in CORR Pro Lite by four points. In fourteen rounds, he had eight podium finishes and eleven Top 5s. Hord won the two rounds of the Nissan National Off Road Shootout. At Crandon he won the Pro Lite world championship race. Hord won his first Pro CORR Lite championship in 2006 by winning one race with thirteen podium finishes in sixteen races.

He moved to the newly formed World Series of Off-Road Racing (WSORR) in 2007. After winning five races and having ten podium finishes in thirteen rounds, he won the series' first Pro Light championship. For 2008 he raced in both WSORR and CORR winning twice in both series. Hord finished fifth in CORR points after the series folded with four remaining rounds. In seventeen starts, he finished twelve times in the Top Five. AMSOIL began sponsoring the team in 2008.

WSORR also folded after the 2008 season and the Traxxas TORC Series took over sanction in the Midwest. He finished third in the 2009 Pro Light points after winning three races and having fourteen Top Fives. Hord attempted his first Pro 4WD Trophy Truck race at Crandon and he finished second with winning the Oakley Bomb Award for the fastest lap time in the race.

=== 2010s ===
Hord moved up into Pro 2WD for the 2010 season. He had second and third places finishes to end up fourth in series points. His first podium finish was his third place finish at Bark River and the second place finish happened at Chicagoland Speedway. In fourteen starts, he finished nine times in the Top Five. Hord had his first Oakley Bomb Award in Pro 2WD making him the first driver to the win Oakley Bomb Award in all three professional truck classes.

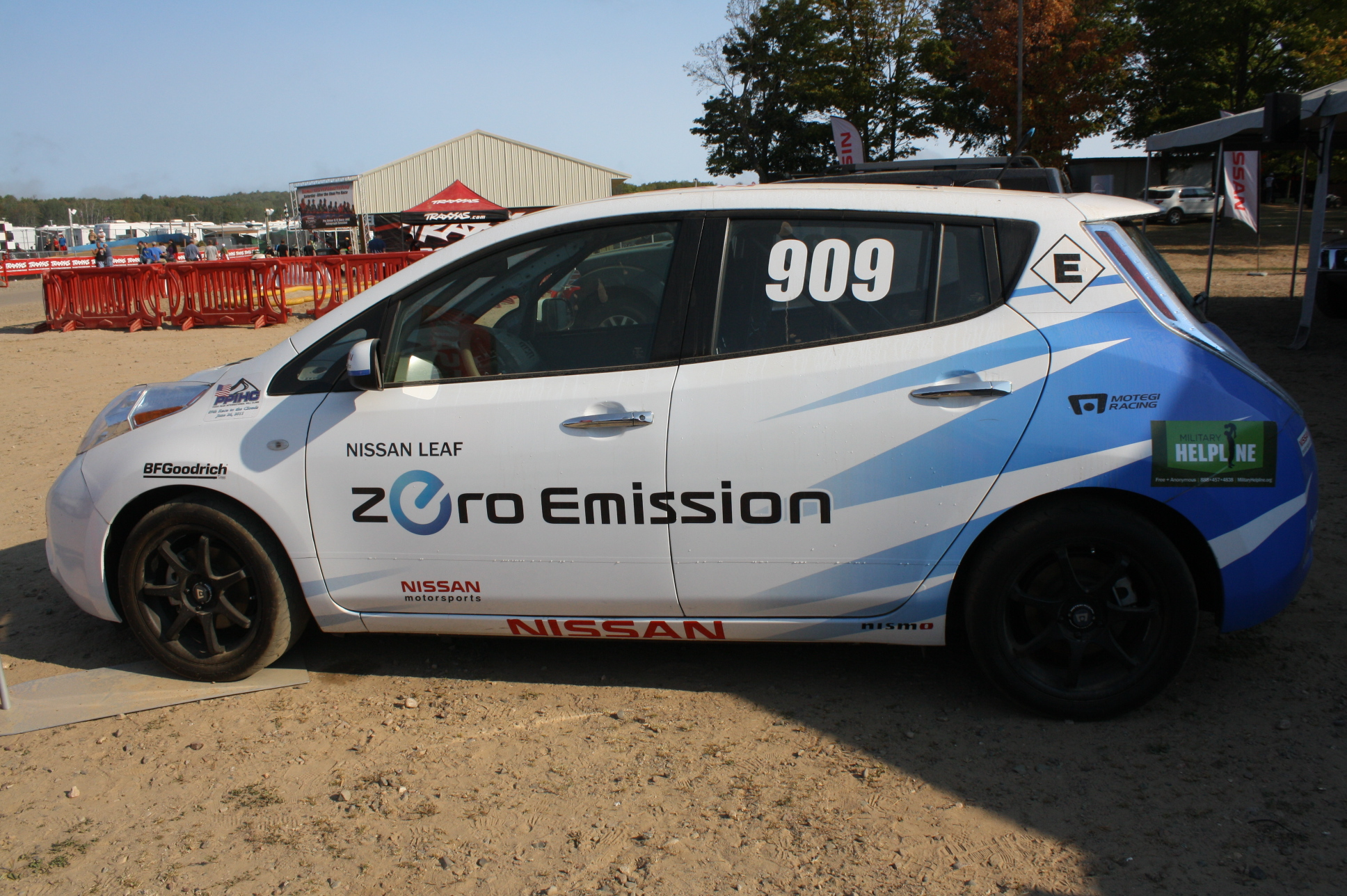
2011 Pikes Peak Hill Climb Electric Production winning car

The Electric Production class debuted at the Pikes Peak International Hill Climb in 2011. Hord entered a Nissan Leaf. He ascended the 19.99 km (12.42 mi) course in 14 minutes and 33 seconds to win the class. The interior of the car was removed and replaced with mandatory racing seats, safety harness, and a roll cage.

Hord was the third Pro 2 driver to win the US$27,000 AMSOIL Cup in 2011 after Scott Taylor won the event twice. The race pits the Pro 2 and Pro 4 Trophy Trucks against each other for the world championship in short-course off-road racing. The Pro 2 trophy trucks started 20 seconds ahead of the Pro 4 trucks to make up their disadvantage of having only rear-wheel drive compared to four-wheel drive. Hord maintained the lead throughout the race and no one came close to passing him. For the season, he finished third in 2WD points. Hord's 2012 TORC Pro 2WD season started with five out of six podium finishes; he finished third in points for the year after five second-place finishes.

== Philanthropy ==
In early 2011, Hord spent fourteen days visiting United States troops on the 2011 Armed Forces Entertainment Pro Off-Road Champions Tour.

== Personal life ==
Hord married the former Amy Anderson in 2001 and they have two daughters. Amy works in Public Relations and hospitality for the team.

== Images ==
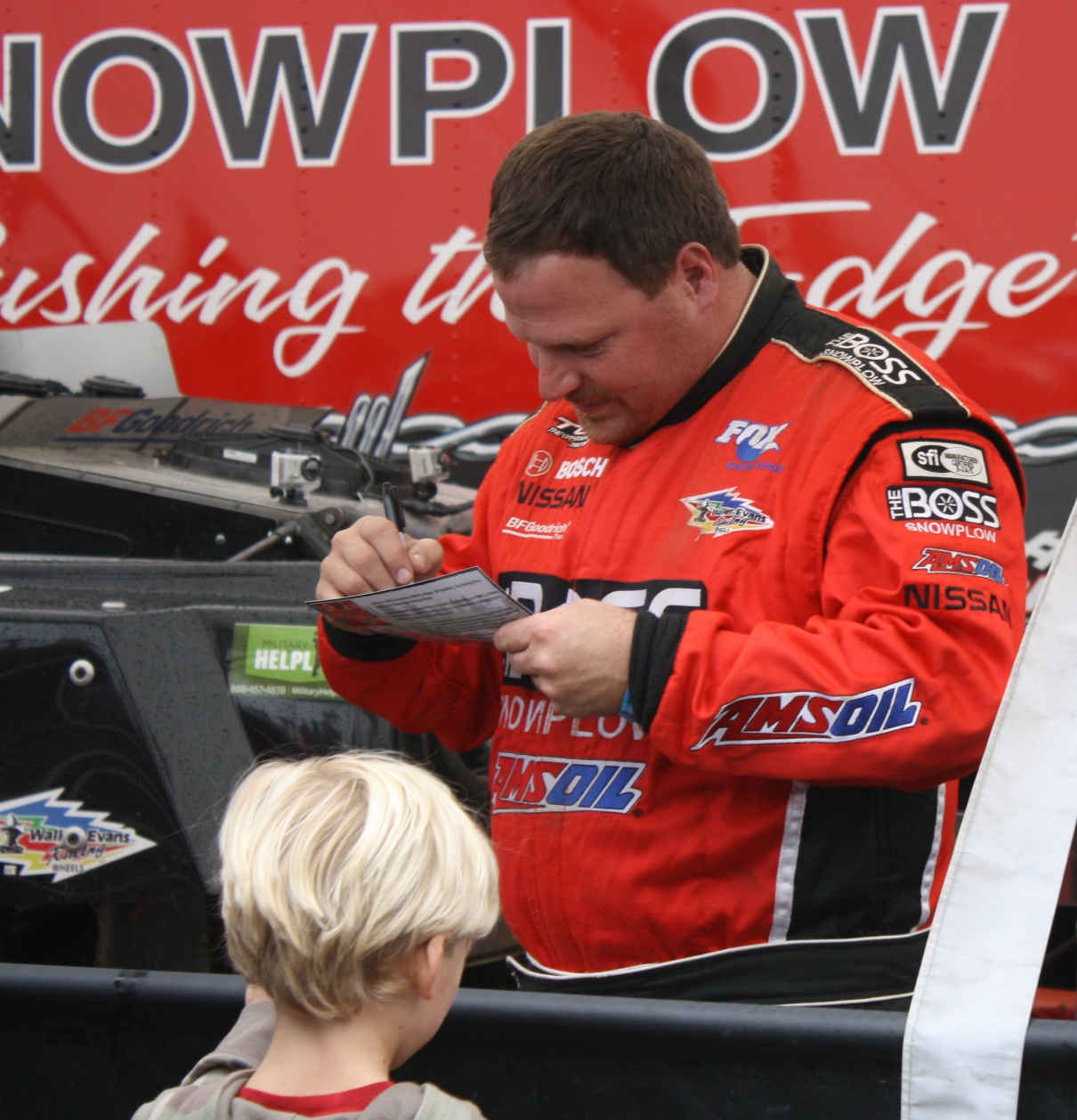
Signing autographs for a kid in 2011

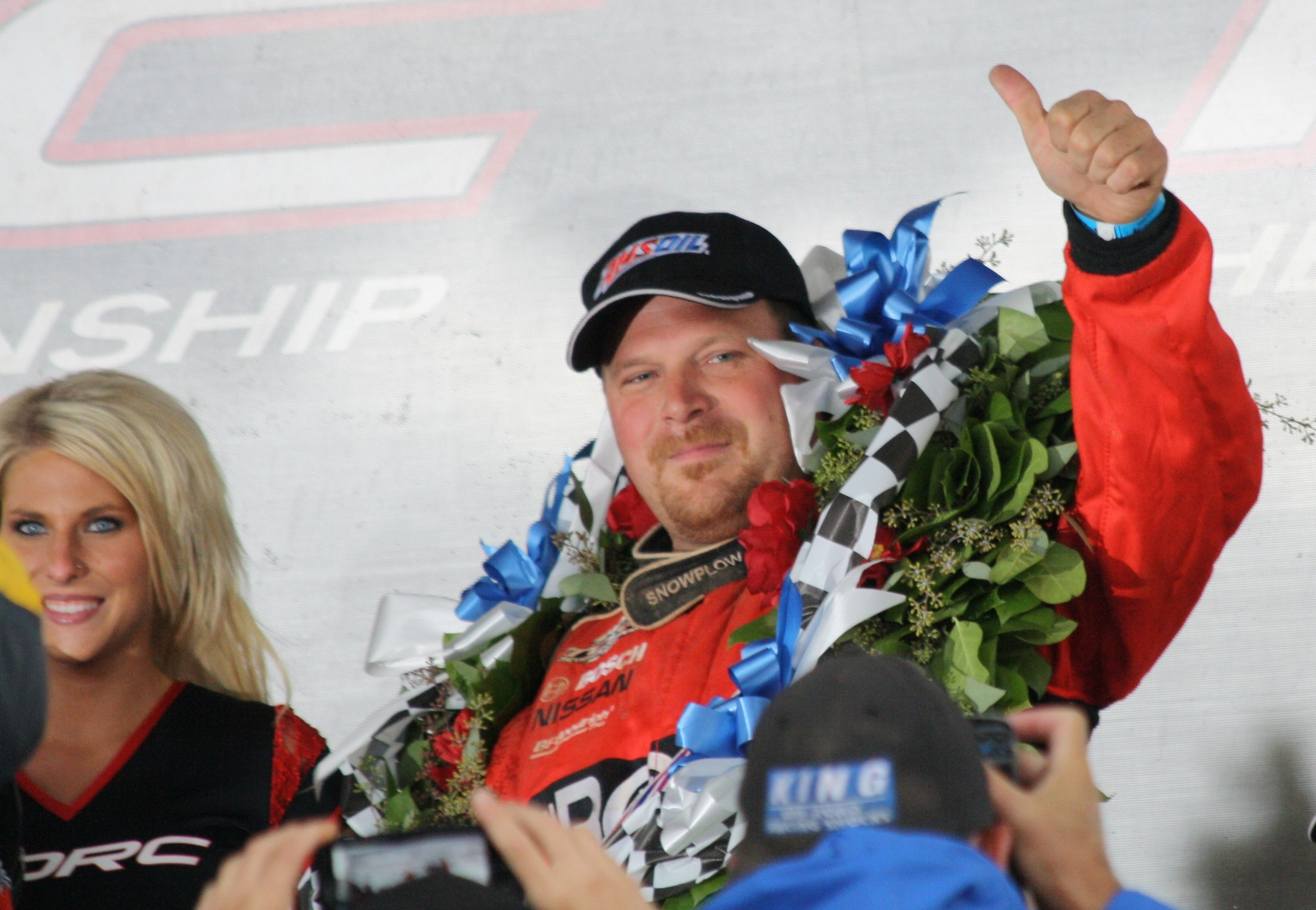
Thumbs up after winning 2011 AMSOIL Cup

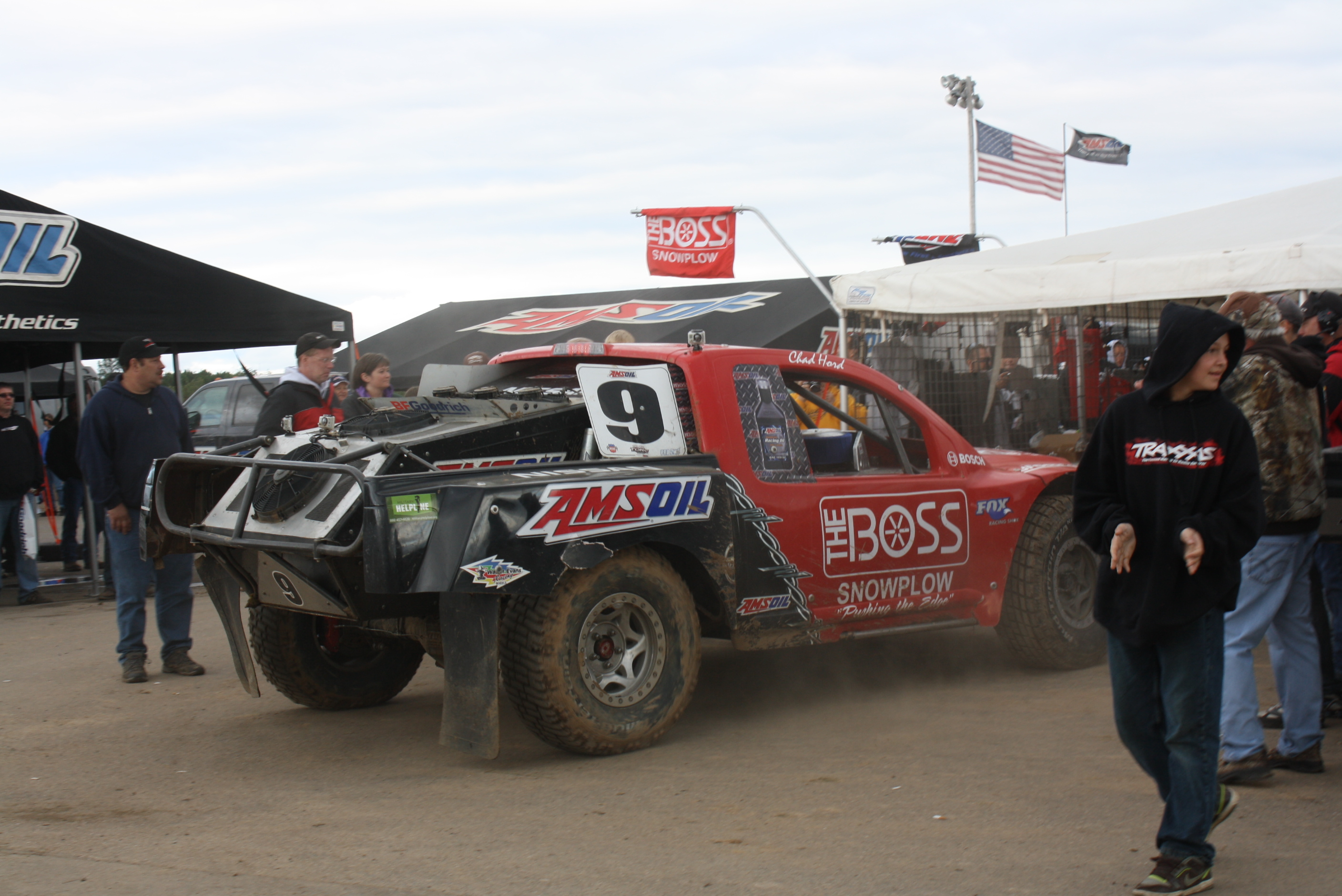
Pulling into the pits after winning 2011 AMSOIL Cup

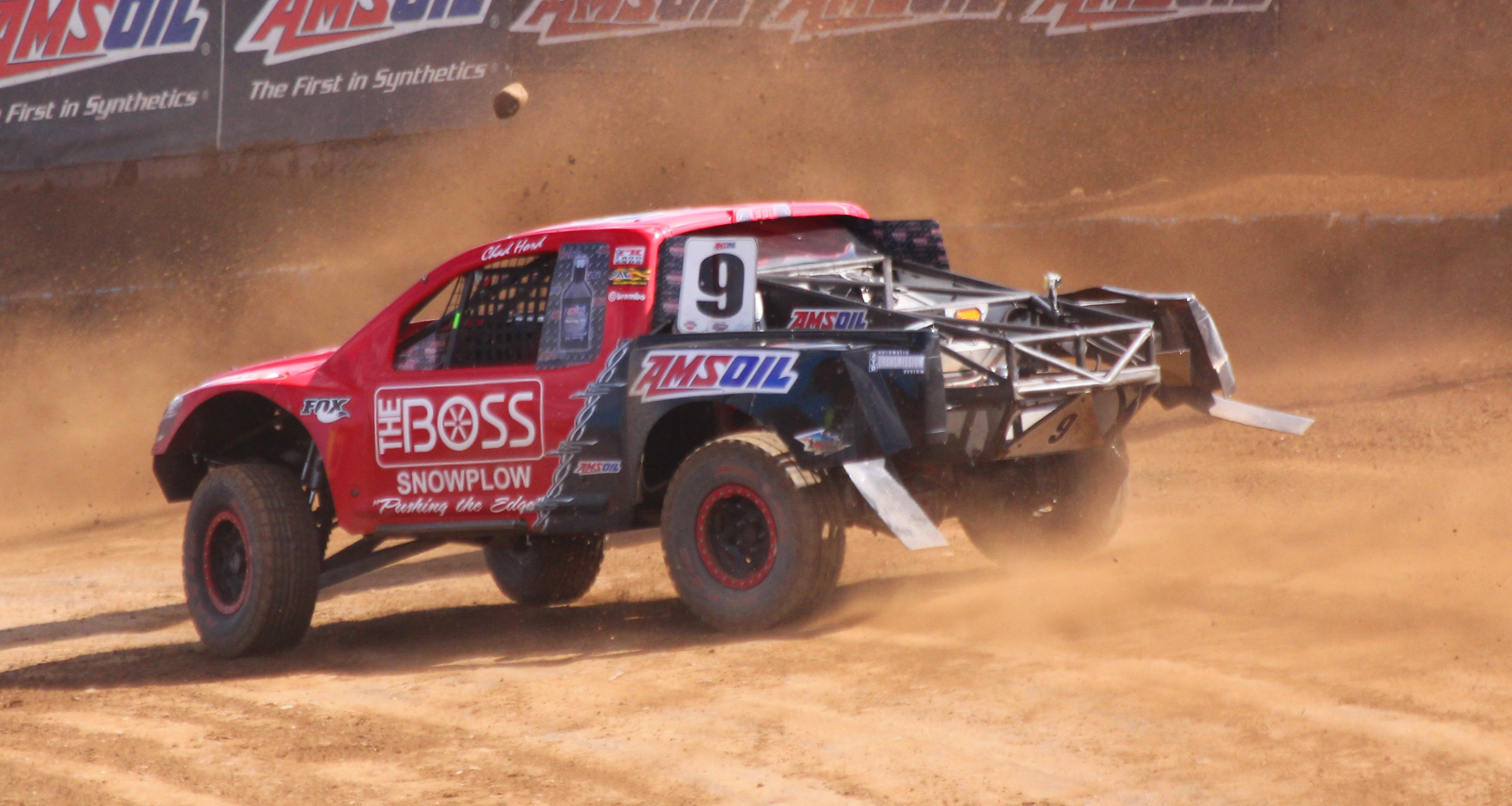
Racing at Crandon in 2013
