= Lincoln Speedway (Illinois) =

Coordinates: 40°9′15″N 89°23′3″W

Lincoln Speedway, located in Lincoln, Illinois on the Logan County Fairgrounds, is a 1/4 mile dirt race track that opened in 2004. Lincoln Speedway races were held on Friday nights. After running races sanctioning by the United Midwestern Promoters (UMP), it switched to DIRTcar sanction.

In 2007 Lincoln Speedway hosted events for World of Outlaws Late Model Series and UMP Summernationals as well as their local racing series'. 2008 will see more of the same from both sanctioning bodies, as well as full-time sanctioning from United Midwestern Promoters. In 2008, Lincoln Speedway acquired their very own 2-seat Late Model, and offer rides in it after the racing program is finished. Lincoln Speedway's season opening race for 2011 is Friday, April 8, and the speedway will also hold a NASCAR Night on Tuesday, June 14 for the first time ever. The track was scheduled to be the first co-sanctioned event with the World of Outlaws Late Models and UMP Hell Tour in July 2016 but it rained out.

Thursday, September 3, 2015 Lincoln Speedway become operated by Bob Sargent's Track Enterprises, which also manages Macon Speedway. The previous 2 seasons had been run by Ken Dobson of CILTRAK, which promoted Quincy Raceways and Jacksonville Speedway at the time. He still runs Jacksonville today.

== Major events ==
Date	Series	Winner
May 13, 2007	World of Outlaws Late Model Series	Brian Shirley
June 24, 2007	UMP Summernationals	Don O'Neal
May 18, 2008	World of Outlaws Late Model Series	Chub Frank
June 29, 2008	UMP Summernationals	Brian Shirley
May 17, 2009	World of Outlaws Late Model Series	Rick Eckert
June 28, 2009	UMP Summernationals	Randy Korte
May 7, 2010	World of Outlaws Late Model Series	Shane Clanton
July 4, 2010	UMP Summernationals	Jason Feger
July 3, 2011	UMP Summernationals	Brandon Sheppard
June 30, 2013	UMP Summernationals	Bobby Pierce
July 2, 2017	UMP Hell Tour	Brandon Sheppard

== Racing classes ==
- DIRTcar Pro Late model
- DIRTcar Modified
- DIRTcar Street Stock
- DIRTcar Midget
- DIRTcar Hornet (4 cylinders)

== Track records ==
The track record for Midgets was set when the USAC Midgets made their first ever visit on July 2, 2017 by Tanner Thorson of Mendon, Nevada at 13.616 seconds
