= Jan C. Gabriel =

- Born: 1940; Wisconsin
- Died: January 10, 2010 (aged 69)
- Occupation: Motorsport announcer
- Known for: "Sunday! Sunday! Sunday!"

Jan C. Gabriel (1940 – January 10, 2010) was a Chicago-area motorsport announcer who is best known for popularizing the motorsport phrase "Sunday! Sunday! Sunday!"

== Early life ==
Gabriel was born in 1940 in Wisconsin and grew up in Palos Heights, Illinois. He graduated from Sandburg High School. Gabriel produced commercials for Community Discount stores and worked behind the microphone at WJOB in Hammond as a disc jockey.

In the 1950s, Gabriel had billed himself as "Chicago's youngest teenage DJ" when he started at record hops. It wasn't until 1968 that he combined his love of announcing and racing into a stint at Santa Fe Speedway in Hinsdale, IL. While other announcers would usually just do a play-by-play at other racetracks, Gabriel would usually go wild with his announcing duties, usually being in the middle of track while announcing.

== "Sunday! Sunday! Sunday!" phrase ==
In 1967 The Sunday, Sunday, Sunday radio spot was recorded at WLTH radio in Gary, IN by Jerry Wilkerson and Peter Jerome at 10 AM on Thursday mornings. It usually took an hour to "get it together" because the copy was so long it ran more than 60 seconds to record, or the announcers screwed up, lost their breath or just missed a word. Because it was tape, the announcers had to record it again from the beginning. A courier from Chicago, who brought the copy with him, would run the taped spot back to Chicago for distribution to WLS and possibly WCFL for air Thursday afternoon through Sunday morning. "Where the great ones run," was not yet used as a tag line in the spots in 1967.

In 1968, Ben Christ, the track owner of the U.S. 30 drag strip in Hobart, Indiana, wanted to advertise and make it known that his tracks were open on Sundays. He enlisted the help of Steve Cronen at Starbeat Recording Studios in Deerfield, Illinois. Originally, the idea for the tagline was to have two announcers trade intonations of "Sunday!"

After dismissing nearly 50 announcers because they weren't vibrant enough, Gabriel's announcing was picked as the iconic tagline by Cronen. The spots ended with "Where the great ones run!", read and echoed by Gabriel. His deep voice and tagline was extensively used by Christ in many of his other racing venues advertisements, with Gabriel often recording fresh tracks up until the 1980s.

The tagline was often imitated by other racetrack announcers and in popular culture till its decline in the 1980s as many small tracks and drag strips closed down or were absorbed by other organizations.

== Later life ==
In 1980, suffering from polycystic kidney disease, Gabriel underwent a kidney transplant. Another transplant was needed and set up in 2004, but Gabriel was unable to find a suitable donor. His legs were amputated below the knee in 2005.

Gabriel was the host and producer of the syndicated TV show The Super Chargers Show, which ran from 1982 to 1994. The show covered many aspects of Motorsport and car culture along with celebrity guests. Gabriel is credited in bringing both NASCAR and the National Hot Rod Association on television, as well as popularizing Monster Trucks.

Still connected to motorsports, he helped to transfer Team Demolition Derby, a Santa Fe Speedway standby, to Route 66 Raceway in Joliet, IL. In 2003, Gabriel invited drivers from Canada, Australia and New Zealand to compete in the Team Demo Association World Championship. In the first Championship, the USA team won.

Gabriel received The World of Wheels "Lifetime Achievement Award" in 2008.

In November of 2024, he posthumously received the Satellite Award at the International Monster Truck Museum & Hall of Fame in Butler Indiana.

== Death ==
Gabriel died on Sunday, January 10, 2010, from polycystic kidney disease and complications from peripheral artery disease. Funeral services were held on Sunday, January 17 at his home in Lombard, Illinois. He is survived by his wife, Teresa (who is now the president of Team Demolition Derby), and a daughter, Amanda.
