= Jeff Leka =

American racing driver

Jeff Leka is an American racing driver who won the NASCAR Weekly Series national championship in 1999.

Driving a dirt Modified owned by Jim and John Livingston, Leka won 15 of the 18 races that he entered at Macon Speedway in Illinois.
