= The Off-Road Championship =

Former racing series

TORC: The Off-Road Championship
- Sport: Offroad racing
- Jurisdiction: United States
- Founded: 2009
- President: BJ Birtwell
- Replaced: WSORR
- Closure date: 2018

Official website
- www.torcseries.com

TORC: The Off-Road Championship (TORC) was an American short course off-road racing series. It tours throughout the United States featuring professional four and two-wheel-drive Trophy Trucks along with a Pro Light class. TORC was founded by off-road racing driver Ricky Johnson in 2009. It was known as the Traxxas TORC Series, owing to title sponsor Traxxas, from 2009 to 2013. It was purchased by The Armory in August 2013. It was sanctioned and officiated by the United States Auto Club (USAC) since its inception.

A multi-year deal between TORC and NBC Sports was announced in 2014 where it was confirmed that NBC would carry not only the series' on-track events but its docu-reality series as well. However, the series returned to Fox Sports in 2015. Coverage of events for 2016 and 2017 was broadcast by BeIN Sports.

The series has not returned since announcing the cancellation of all events in 2018, the series itself would then quietly fold near the end of 2018 with the series website being taken down shortly after.

== History ==
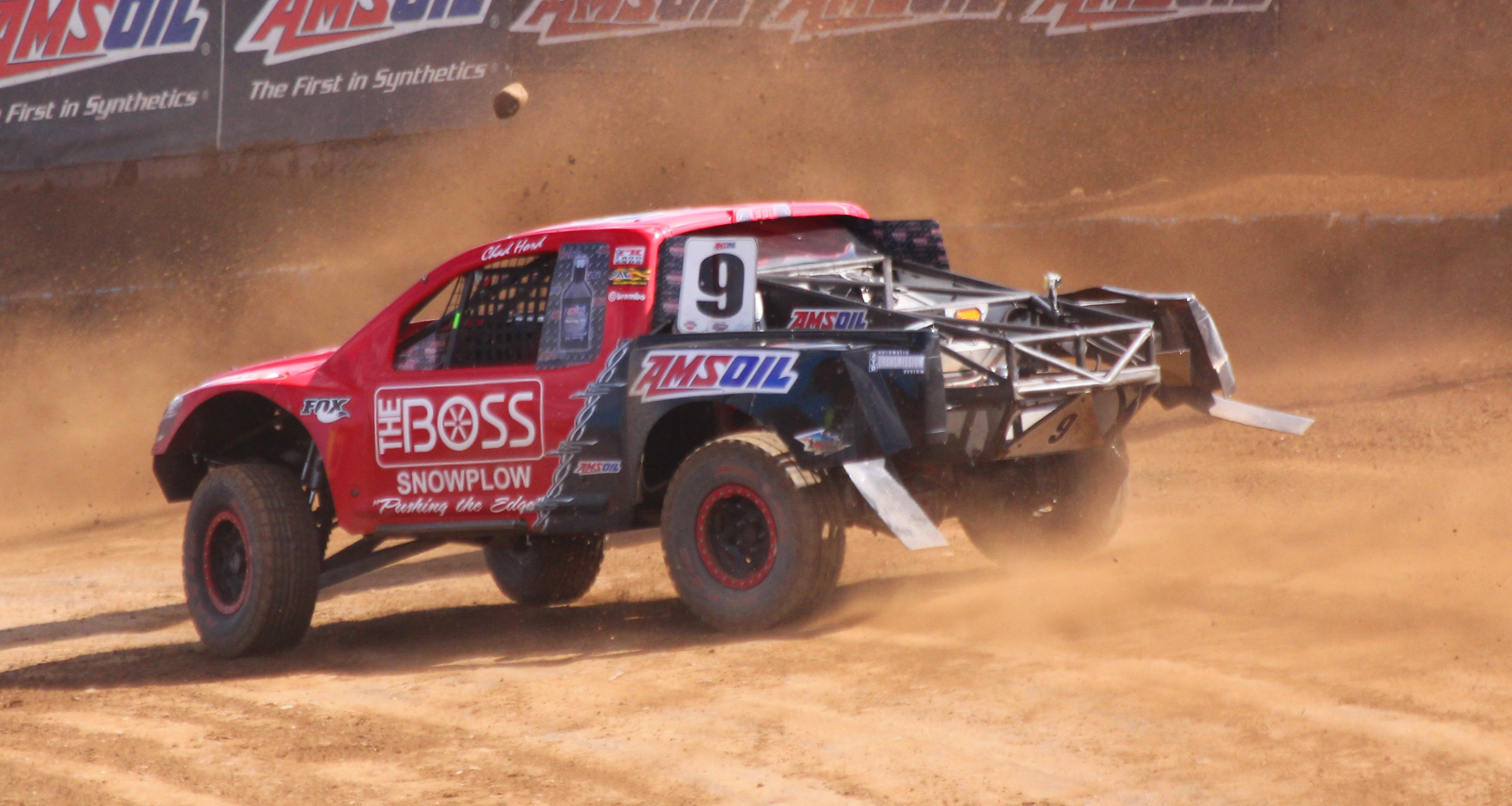
Chad Hord PRO 2WD truck from 2013 at Crandon

The series was founded in time for the 2009 season by former motocross racer and Motorcycle Hall of Fame member Ricky Johnson as the Traxxas TORC Series after hosting an off-road racing event at his Perris Auto Speedway in 2008. There were two large sanctioning bodies in short course off-road racing for 2008: CORR and WSORR. CORR had been sanctioning events on the West Coast and WSORR had sanctioned Midwest events. CORR closed before the end of the 2008 season and canceled its final two racing weekends. TORC took over the sanctioning of most of the Midwest events.

USAC assumed complete management of the series starting in 2010. The Armory took over ownership of the series in late 2013 to handle all marketing and operations of the series. USAC remained on board as the sanctioning body. One of The Armory's first acts was securing an exclusive 5-year agreement landing the series championship weekend at Crandon International Off-Road Raceway starting in 2014, ensuring no competing sanctions can race at the track. In late 2015, Mountain Sports International took over managing the series. MSI immediately announced adding sportsman racing back under its sanction starting in 2016.

In March 2018, the series announced that it would hold no events in 2018.

== Divisions ==
Pro 2 demonstration
Rick Johnson demonstrates a Pro 2 Trophy Truck at Oshkosh (2009) – 555 kB, 7 sec

The series was originally divided into Pro, Sportsman, and Grassroots divisions. The Pro division is headlined by a four-wheel drive (PRO 4WD) trophy truck class. It also has a two-wheel drive trophy truck class (PRO 2WD) and a light-duty two-wheel drive pickup truck class (PRO Light).

The series began with a Sportsman truck division, consisting of four- and two-wheel drive truck classes plus a stock truck class. Sportsman buggies featured regular 70 horsepower buggies plus a light class with restricted 55 horsepower engines. It had three grassroots classes all featuring stock vehicles. The Formula 4x4 trucks were stock 4x4 trucks or SUVs, Classix race cars were stock cars with modified suspensions, and the Enduro trucks were two wheel drive 3/4 ton pickup chassis. The Sportsman division later was later dropped by TORC and a separate entity named Midwest Off Road Racing (MORR) was created to sanction those trucks. TORC restored the sportsman classes for the 2016 season after MSI took over its sanction.

== Drivers ==
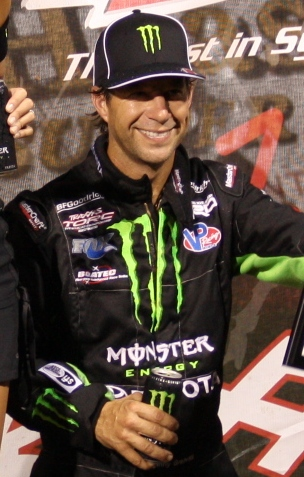
2013 and 2014 PRO 4WD champion Johnny Greaves

=== Champions ===
| Year | PRO 4WD | PRO 2WD | PRO Light |
|---|---|---|---|
| 2009 | Rick Huseman | Rob MacCachren | Jeff Kincaid |
| 2010 | Johnny Greaves | Ricky Johnson | Casey Currie |
| 2011 | Ricky Johnson | Bryce Menzies | Andrew Caddell |
| 2012 | Ricky Johnson | Bryce Menzies | Brad Lovell |
| 2013 | Johnny Greaves | Bryce Menzies | Keegan Kincaid |
| 2014 | Johnny Greaves | C. J. Greaves | Jerett Brooks |
| 2015 | C. J. Greaves | C. J. Greaves | Doug Mittag |
| 2016 | C. J. Greaves | C. J. Greaves | Kyle Hart |
| 2017 | C. J. Greaves | Luke Johnson | Kyle Kleiman |

Other drivers to compete for TORC championships include: Brian Deegan, Chad Hord, Jarit Johnson, Scott Taylor and Olympian Nick Baumgartner.

The Pro Buggy class saw its youngest champion ever in 2012, Mitchell deJong joined the series at 14 years old and won the championship against adult veteran racers, in just his rookie year.

== Tracks ==
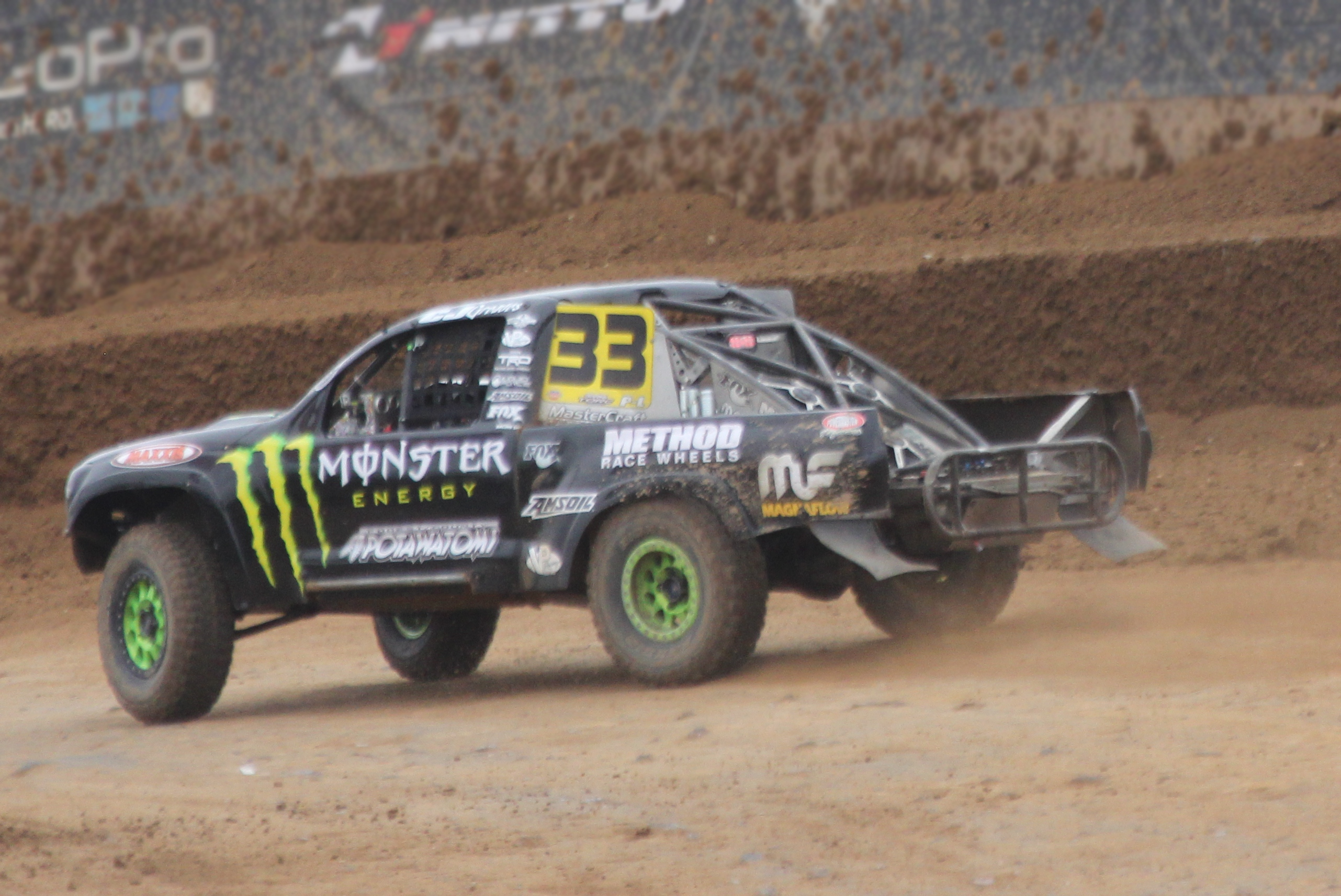
C. J. Greaves PRO Light truck racing at Crandon in 2014

Before the inaugural season, TORC announced that it secured an exclusive deal with Bark River International Raceway and a 15-year exclusive deal with Crandon International Off-Road Raceway. It partnered with NASCAR-related tracks in 2013 including Tony Stewart's Eldora Speedway and Friday and Saturday events in conjunction with the Sunday NASCAR Nationwide Series event at Chicagoland Speedway. TORC did not race at Chicagoland in 2014 but announced shortly after the completion of the season that it would once again host an event at the facility's dirt track in conjunction with the NASCAR Nationwide Series race there June 18–20, 2015.

- Antelope Valley Fairgrounds (2012–2013)
- Bark River International Raceway (2009–2017)
- Buffalo Chip Powersports Complex (2014–2015)
- Charlotte Motor Speedway (2011–2012, 2014–2016)
- Chicagoland Speedway (2010–2013, 2015–2017)
- Crandon International Off-Road Raceway (2009–2017)
- Cycle Ranch (2011)
- Dodge City Raceway (2013)
- Eldora Speedway (2013)
- ERX Motorpark (2016)
- Gateway Motorsports Park (2015)
- Langlade County Speedway (2010)
- Las Vegas Motor Speedway (2009)
- Sunnyview Expo Center (2009–2011)
- Perris Auto Speedway (2009)
- Pikes Peak International Raceway (2011)
- Primm Off Road Raceway (2013–2014)
- Red Bud MX (2011–2013)
- Texas Motor Speedway (2009, 2015–2016)

== Television coverage ==
In 2009, PRO events were televised on national television in the United States with ESPN2 covering the 2009 events at Texas, Crandon's spring event, both Bark River events, and the second Perris event. ABC televised the first 2009 event at Perris and it broadcast Crandon's World Championship Off-Road Races race live. Marty Reid was the lead play by play announcer along with Tes Sewell. Former Miss USA Kimberly Pressler was the pit reporter.

From 2010 through 2012, The Off Road Championship aired on Discovery HD Theatre (now Velocity) and was produced by The Armory (www.thearmoryagency.com) with executive producer B.J. Birtwell. Season 1 consisted of twenty 1-hour episodes which aired from Sept 2010 to March 2011. Four seasons of the program have been produced. These shows featured a style which TORC refers to as docu-reality, the distinguishing feature of which consists of more talk and less live-style racing action coverage.

For 2013, Speed TV broadcast live coverage of the Saturday evening PRO truck events for all the race weekends, excepting the final September event at Primm which was scheduled for NBC. Speed covered two races live, which coverage was also re-aired on Fuel. NBC also broadcast one event. The Armory continued to produce TORC's Television programming in 2014 and 2015 on NBC Sports and Fox Sports, respectively. Bobby Gerould and National Sprint Car Hall of Famer Brady Doty were the broadcast host and PXP announcers while noted motorsports broadcaster Tony Bokhoven was the Pit Reporter.
