= Chris Coates =

American journalist and editor

- Born: Trenton, Michigan, U.S.
- Education: Columbia College Chicago (BA)
- Occupation: Journalist
- Years active: 2004–present
- Employer: Lee Enterprises
- Title: Senior director of local news

Chris Coates is an American journalist and editor. He previously served as senior director of local news at Lee Enterprises and executive editor of the Richmond Times-Dispatch. He was the Illinois Press Association's 2019 Editor of the Year and was included in Editor & Publisher's 2024 "Editors Extraordinaire" class.

== Early life and education ==
Coates was born in Trenton, Michigan. He graduated from Trenton High School and earned a Bachelor of Arts in broadcast journalism from Columbia College Chicago in 2004. While at Columbia, he served as editor-in-chief of the student newspaper, The Columbia Chronicle.

== Career ==
Coates began his journalism career in California in 2004, reporting for the Los Angeles Downtown News and later the San Fernando Valley Business Journal in Woodland Hills, California, where he covered healthcare, biotechnology, and government.

He later joined the Suburban Journals of Greater St. Louis as a reporter and editor. From 2011 to 2015, he held editorial leadership positions at the Sioux City Journal in Iowa, including as editor.

In 2015, Coates became a content coach at The News Journal in Delaware, part of the USA Today Network, with a focus on investigative reporting.

In 2017, Coates became executive editor of the Herald & Review in Decatur, Illinois. In 2019, the paper was included in Editor & Publisher’s "10 Newspapers That Do It Right," a feature recognizing newsroom innovation and performance. He later served as Central Illinois editor for Lee Enterprises, overseeing multiple publications including the Pantagraph in Bloomington, Illinois.

In 2022, Coates became executive editor of the Richmond Times-Dispatch in Richmond, Virginia, and was promoted the following year to Virginia state editor for Lee Enterprises. In 2023, he was appointed senior director of local news for the company.

== Professional involvement ==
Coates has presented at training sessions for the News Leaders Association, Illinois Press Association, New York Press Association, Online Media Campus, Virginia Press Association and Society of Professional Journalists.

He has served on the boards of the Virginia Press Association and Illinois Associated Press Media Editors, as well as on the advisory board of Capitol News Illinois and the Journalism Education Committee of the Society of Professional Journalists.

Coates has judged national journalism competitions, including the Online News Association Online Journalism Awards, the Editor & Publisher EPPY Awards, Report for America, and the Gannett Awards of Excellence.

== Recognition ==
In 2013, Coates was included in Editor & Publisher’s “25 Under 35” list. He was named Editor of the Year by the Illinois Press Association in 2019 and was on Editor & Publisher’s 2024 “Editors Extraordinaire” list.

In 2014, he was named a Chamberlin Fellow at the Greenlee School of Journalism and Communication at Iowa State University.

In 2026, Coates was named a Kiplinger Fellow by the Kiplinger Program in Public Affairs Journalism at Ohio University.
