= Motion Raceway =

Dragstrip in Christian County, Illinois

Coordinates: 39°33′51″N 89°03′02″W

Motion Raceway is a dragstrip that operated from 1970 until 1983. It was located in Assumption Township approximately 3 miles north of Assumption, Illinois, in Christian County, Illinois and 1.1 miles west of U.S. Route 51.

== History ==
John Jones owned and operated Motion Raceway from its very beginnings. Operating from 1970 until its demise in 1983, The track was originally a quarter-mile strip but moved to a 1,000-ft configuration when its 3,000-ft total length became insufficient. Motion Raceway hosted both NHRA and IHRA National Events, and drew nationally known names such as Don Garlits and Shirley Muldowney.

After the 1983 season, the track was closed, the stands were removed, as was the fuel island. The Hemi-powered in-ground starter for the cars was removed, and filled in. Later, Motion's tower was moved a short distance north to Macon Speedway, in Macon, Illinois.

Several rumors circulated over the years as to the reason for the track's demise. Arguably the most popular was that the owner was robbed of the purse money at gunpoint. There were also rumors almost every year since the track's closing, that it would be re-opening the following year, or later in the year.

== Today ==
For several years (up until 2008), the track itself had been used for grain storage by Moweaqua Farmer's Co-Op. They would lay the grain on the track, and cover it with tarps until it could be moved into the elevator. The town of Moweaqua, in Shelby County, Illinois is approximately 5 miles north of Motion Raceway.

Plans had been in place for Motion Raceway to be re-opened. May 3, 2008, was to see racing return to Motion Raceway. Greg Clayton of New Covenant Performance, who was to be in charge of the racing, posted on his website a statement that plans had fallen through. He had secured insurance, but both policy submissions were rejected by the owners of the property. It was also stated that people had entered the property at night, and had caused damage to the property.
