= Motosports Park =

Coordinates: 42°05.262′N 089°17.306′W

Motosports Park is a motocross facility near Byron, Illinois, United States. Founded by Joe Vincer in 1969, MSP (as it came to be known) caught on almost immediately in the Midwest motorcycle community. Now run by Joe's son Aaron, MSP is home to about 35 motocross and ATV events annually, including the ten-part Nuclear Series, an American Historic Racing Motorcycle Association (AHRMA) Regional race, the first leg of the Racer X Senior Series, frequent American Motorcyclist Association (AMA) Regional and National Qualifiers, and occasionally the Illinois District 17 State Championships. It is located in Rockvale Township in Ogle County, Illinois, just southwest of Byron.

The Nuclear Series is named after the two huge nuclear power plant towers, part of the Byron Nuclear Generating Station, that loom ominously over the park. The power plant was built after MSP was.

A large attraction to MSP is the final round of the Nuclear Series, which concludes with a pig roast, awards ceremony and parties in the pits.

In 2004 Aaron Vincer announced that he was building another track on the grounds of Motosports Park, which (named by his mother, Sue Hachmeister) became known as the Hilltop Track (and consequently the original track became known as the Legacy Track). Hilltop is now home to the 50cc, 65cc junior and beginner, and all ATV classes. Legacy remains home to the 65cc senior, 85cc, 125cc, 250cc and age division classes.
