= Scott Taylor (racing driver) =

American racing driver

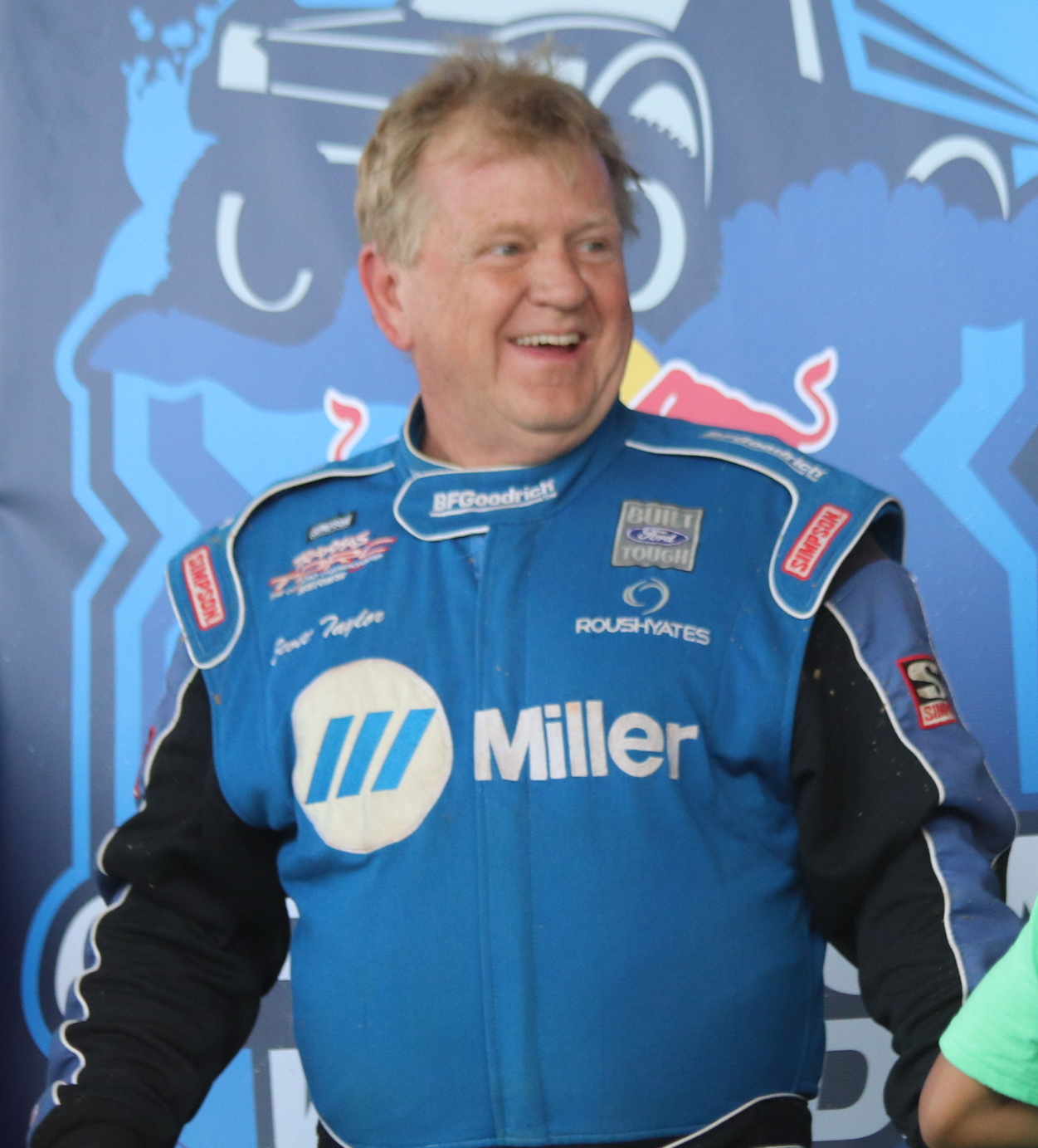
- Taylor at Crandon in 2019
- Born: September 15, 1955 (age 71) Belvidere, Illinois, U.S.
- Retired: 2013

Traxxas TORC Series
- Years active: 2009–2013
- Teams: Taylor Racing
- Best finish: 4th in 2009

Previous series
- 2007–2008 1998–2008 1989–1998 1993: WSORR; CORR; SODA; ESPN Pro Series

Championship titles
- WSORR Pro-2 (2007); CORR PRO-2 (1999, 2000, 2001, 2002, 2003, 2004); SODA Class 8 (1991, 1992, 1994, 1996, 1997); SODA Class 7s (1989, 1990, 1992, 1993); ESPN Pro Series Class 8 (1993); ESPN Pro Series Class 7s (1993)

Awards
- 1994 SODA Sportsman of the Year; 1993 SODA Driver of the Year & Best Pit Appearance; 1992 Ford/SODA Hard Charging Award

Scott Phillip McGraw Taylor (born September 15, 1955) is an American former professional off-road racing driver from Belvidere, Illinois. His off-road racing career began in 1974 with buggies and his career peaked in the premiere two-wheel-drive truck class called Pro2. He retired from driving after the completion of the 2013 Traxxas TORC Series (TORC) Heavy Metal race at Crandon.

Taylor won championships during the 1980s, 1990s, and 2000s in the series that sanctioned off-road racing in the Midwestern United States. He racked up championships in Short-course Off-road Drivers Association (SODA), SCORE International, ESPN PRO Series, Championship Off-Road Racing (CORR) and World Series of Off-Road Racing (WSORR). Taylor won six consecutive Pro 2 championships in CORR between 1999 and 2004. He was the first two-wheel-drive truck winner of the Heavy Metal Challenge (now AMSOIL Cup) world championship race at Crandon International Off-Road Raceway in 2002; he repeated the win in 2008.

Taylor raced with Ford Motor Company vehicles for much of his professional career and he joined the "Ford Rough Riders" group near the end of their five-year promotion in 1995. While a professional driver, he used Roush Racing engines (later Roush-Yates engines).

== Racing career ==
=== Early career: 1970s and 1980s ===
Taylor began his involvement with motorsports as a child. In a 2012 interview with the Rockford Register Star, he said "I was hopping up my dad’s lawn mower to make it mow faster when I was 6 years old." He began racing off-road Volkswagen buggies in 1972, one year before he graduated from high school. Taylor began his off-road racing career in 1974 at the Indian Summer Sprints at the Lake Geneva Raceway near his hometown Belvidere. In 1979, he won the 4x4 Unlimited Memorial Day Challenge of Champions Showdown. Taylor won the 1980 Florida 400 Challenge of Champions Showdown. In 1981 he won the Montreal Olympic Stadium four-wheel championship and he repeated the win in 1982. Taylor changed to unlimited buggy for 1983 and he won the SCORE International Riverside International Raceway Class 2 championships in 1983 and 1984. He also started racing off-road trucks in 1984. Taylor ended the decade by winning the 1989 SODA Class 7s championship for the mini-pickup trucks.

=== 1990s ===
Taylor continued in Class 7s and won the 1990 championship. His full-sized trophy trucks career began in 1991 with his first season in Class 8. Class 8 had the premiere two-wheel-drive trophy trucks which generated about 800 horsepower. He returned to Class 7s in 1992 and won championships in 1992 and 1993; he became a factory driver in 1993. In 1994, he dedicated himself to just Class 8 racing; he won the championships in 1994 and 1996.

Taylor won the 1997 SODA Class 8 points title over future NASCAR drivers Walker Evans, Brendan Gaughan, and five-time champion Jimmie Johnson.

In 1998, Taylor joined most of the SODA drivers by switching sanctioning bodies to CORR. Taylor took second in the 1998 CORR Pro-2 championship to off-road racing rookie and multiple-time motocross champion Ricky Johnson.

In the 1999 CORR Winter Series, Taylor ended the decade by dominating the short series. He dominated the final race and won the series' championship with 253 points - 36 points higher than Dan Vanden Heuvel.

=== 2000s and 2010s ===
Taylor battled Evan Evans for the 2000 Pro-2 championship. In the fourth last round, he started eighth after the top eight trucks were inverted. He rose up to fifth by the end of the final lap and finished second behind Evans. Evans held the points lead going into the third last race. Taylor won the third last round and regained the points lead by three points. The final two races were held on the same day on a wet track. Taylor finished second, three spots ahead of Evans to hold an eight points lead. Later that day, the water coolant in Taylor's truck poured out the overflow in the second lap and he ran the rest of the race with no coolant. The engine was able to continue without coolant and Taylor finished fifth to win the 2000 CORR Pro-2 championship.

Miller Electric became a secondary sponsor for Taylor's truck in 2001. The CORR Pro-2 championship battle was tight, Taylor was within five points of Evan Evans heading into the final two rounds at Crandon. He ended up winning his third straight championship.

Jeff Frana took over as Taylor's crew chief in 2002. He continued to use Roush Racing engines and had Mobil 1, BFGoodrich and Ford Motor Company as primary sponsors. Taylor became the first Pro-2 driver to win the Governor's Cup at Crandon in 2002 and he was presented the trophy from Wisconsin Governor Scott McCallum. He was the honorary grand marshal for the 2002 world championship weekend parade at Crandon. In the Saturday race, Taylor pulled out to the lead by the first turn and Walker Evans tangled with Dan Vanden Heuvel giving Taylor a large lead. After catching and following Evans for two laps, Taylor clipped him and was black flagged. He left the pit box too early and was penalized again which led to him finishing fourth. The final points race happened the next day. Taylor raced to third place by the first corner and kept swapping second with Evans. Taylor finished second and won his record fourth straight Pro 2 championship. The Borg Warner World Championship Manufacture Challenge race (now AMSOIL Cup) took place later that afternoon pitting the two-wheel-drive Pro-2 trucks against the faster 4x4 Pro-4 trucks. The five fastest Pro-2 trucks started 1,000 feet (300 m) ahead of the other thirty competitors and Taylor was fourth by the first turn and he quickly moved up to second place behind Carl Renezeder. The Pro-4 drivers Curt LeDuc and Johnny Greaves caught Taylor and Renezeder. Taylor passed Renezeder and LeDuc slowed putting Taylor three seconds ahead of Greaves. Greaves blew a tire and Taylor won the race becoming the first two-wheel-drive winner.

Taylor won his fifth straight CORR Pro-2 championship in 2003 after winning six of thirteen CORR races; he finished in the top five in each event. After winning the Pro Precision Gear Driver of the Year, Taylor was nominated by the American Auto Racing Writers & Broadcasters Association All-American Team in the At Large category. At that point, he was the winningest driver in CORR history having 34 wins in 93 starts.

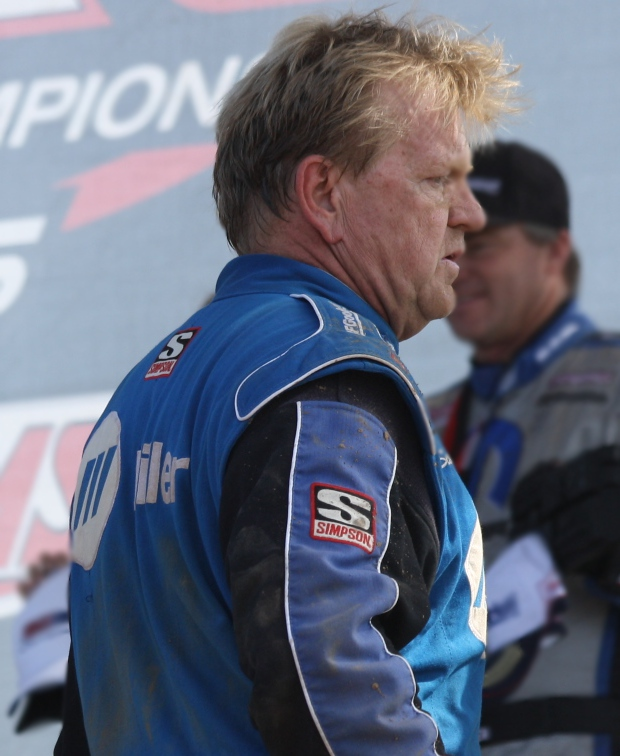
Taylor in 2012

In 2004, Taylor was leading Walker Evan's son Evan Evans by 18 points going into the final two-race weekend. The track was wet and slippery on the Saturday race and Taylor finished fourth, two spots ahead of Evans. In the final round, Taylor finished in second place, one spot in front of Evans, to win his sixth consecutive Pro-2 CORR title.

Taylor started off 2005 by pulling quickly into third place at I-96 Speedway; he raced up to second and passed Kevin Probst's truck for the win near the end of the final lap. The final two-race weekend happened at the temporary Otay Ranch circuit in Chula Vista, California. On in the second turn of the first lap of the Saturday race, a mechanical problem in the oil pump stopped oil from flowing through the engine. Taylor shut the engine off and mechanical DNF ended his chance at winning the championship. On the Sunday race, Taylor led for the first eleven laps before falling back after blowing a rear tire on lap 10 then later blew the other rear tire; he had to drive slower and finished third. Taylor finished third in the final points behind Carl Renezeder and Dan Vandenhuvel.

Taylor was one point behind the points leader heading into the final points weekend in 2006. On the Saturday round he had to back off the throttle to avoid a crash and he was eighth in place. He passed several trucks by the sixth lap before a broken rear axle hub ended his day; he finished 14th in the 20 truck field. On the Sunday race, Taylor passed into the lead before a torque converter failure on lap seven ended his day; he finished 12th in the race and fourth in the points. He had four wins and eight top 5 finishes.

In 2007, Taylor raced in CORR and its new rival series World Series of Off-Road Racing (WSORR). He won swept both WSORR events at the series' first weekend at Steele County Fairgrounds. Taylor won the inaugural WSORR Pro-2 championship by winning six of thirteen events.

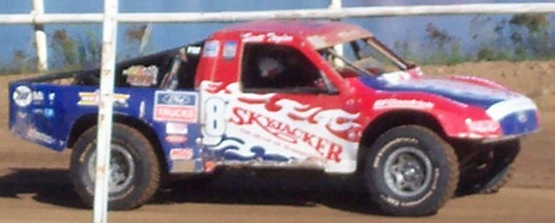
Taylor's 2008 World Championship winning truck

For 2008, Taylor primarily competed in CORR along with selected WSORR events. Taylor and his crew had problems with their new truck and engine during the first half of the season. In the ninth CORR event at Sears Point Raceway, he got a new Roush-Yates engine and used it to finish third for his first podium finish of the season. Taylor started fifth in the Sunday event and passed his way to fourth at the midway caution. As he dove under the top two trucks for the lead, he slid and the vehicle broke ending his day; he was credited with a 19th-place finish. He competed in WSORR during the September Crandon weekend and won the Saturday Pro 2WD event. On Sunday he finished third in the Pro 2WD race. He returned to the track later that day for the 14th annual BorgWarner World Championship race as the only driver to compete in all fourteen prior events. Taylor dominated the race and the top three finishers were all two-wheel-drive trucks for the first time in the event's history. He finished the 10 laps around the 1.5 miles (2.4 km) circuit in 15 minutes and 6 seconds. It was the second two-wheel-drive win in the race's history. CORR folded before the next event at Primm; Taylor had finished eighth in the season points.

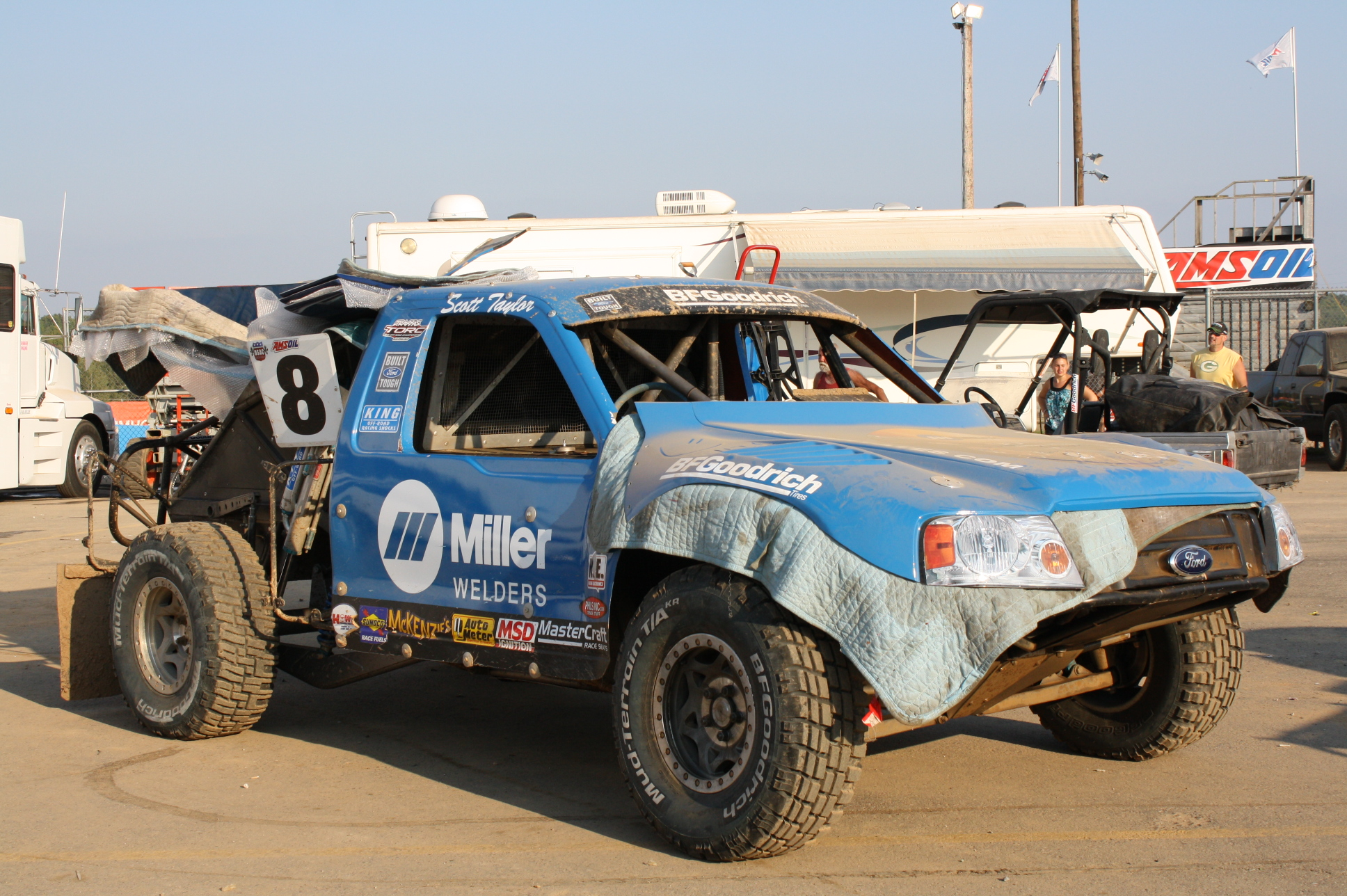
2009 Pro 2 winner from Crandon

With CORR and WSORR meeting their demise during the off-season, the Traxxas TORC Series (TORC) took over as the sanctioning body in the Midwestern United States in 2009. Mike Kasch continued as the team's long-term crew chief and Dustin Pence took over the duty of preparing the truck for racing at their shop. He started out the season by finishing sixth in the Texas Motor Speedway Pro-2 race. The finishing order from that event was used to determine the starting positions in the next round. Six truck were inverted giving Taylor the pole position. Ricky Johnson and Rob MacCachren pressured Taylor for the entire event but Taylor held the lead to win his sixtieth Pro class race since 1999. Taylor had the fastest lap of the race (38.605 seconds) to earn the Oakley Bomb award. Later that season, Taylor and his family were the grand marshal for the Friday parade at the September Crandon World Championship weekend. He had new primary sponsorship from Miller Welders and won the Sunday world championship event. He led the entire race, broke the track 2WD track record, and won another Oakley Bomb Award for the fastest lap. Taylor finished sixth in the final season points with three wins and three Oakley Bomb awards.

=== 2010s and retirement ===
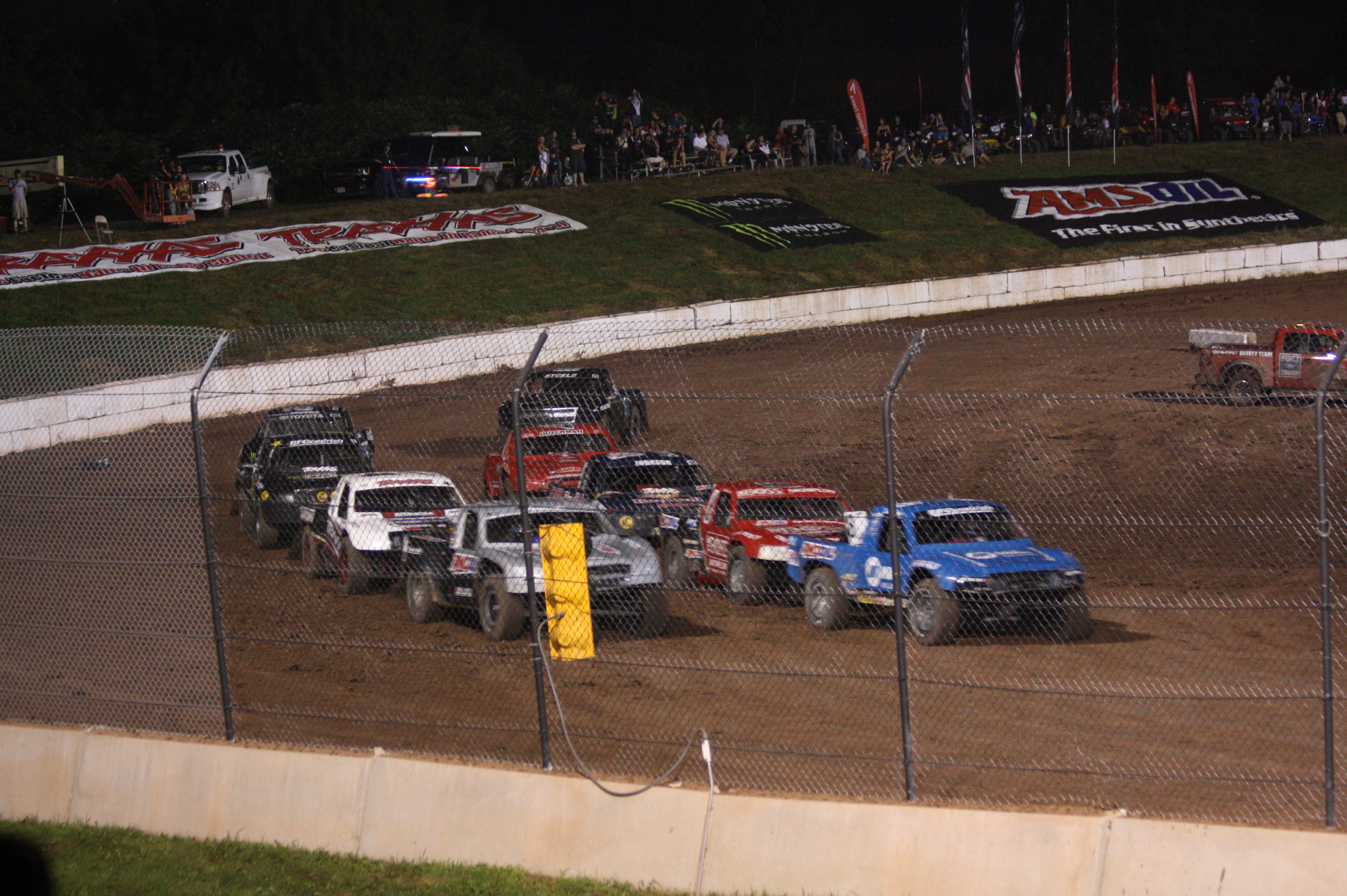
Taylor (blue truck) leading at Oshkosh in 2010

Taylor continued racing in TORC in 2010. At the final weekend at Crandon, Taylor had a podium spot on the Saturday race until his truck broke late in the race. On Sunday, he used the land rush start to begin the race in third place by the middle of the first lap - a spot that he maintained throughout the entire race.

In 2011, Taylor competed at all of the rounds except the final weekend at Cycle Ranch near Floresville, Texas. Highlights of the season including finishing second at the Sunday race at RedBud MX and he took second on the Saturday race at Charlotte Motor Speedway. Taylor ended up seventh in TORC Pro 2WD points.

During the 2012 season, Taylor announced that 2013 would be his final season. He only raced in four TORC weekends that season at Crandon, Bark River, and Chicagoland Speedway and he led the Sunday race of the first Crandon weekend (June) until the final lap. Taylor would end up with podium finishes at all three tracks. Taylor finished second at Crandon, third at the Saturday Chicagoland race, and fourth and third at Bark River. Taylor finished ninth in points after competing in seven of fourteen races.

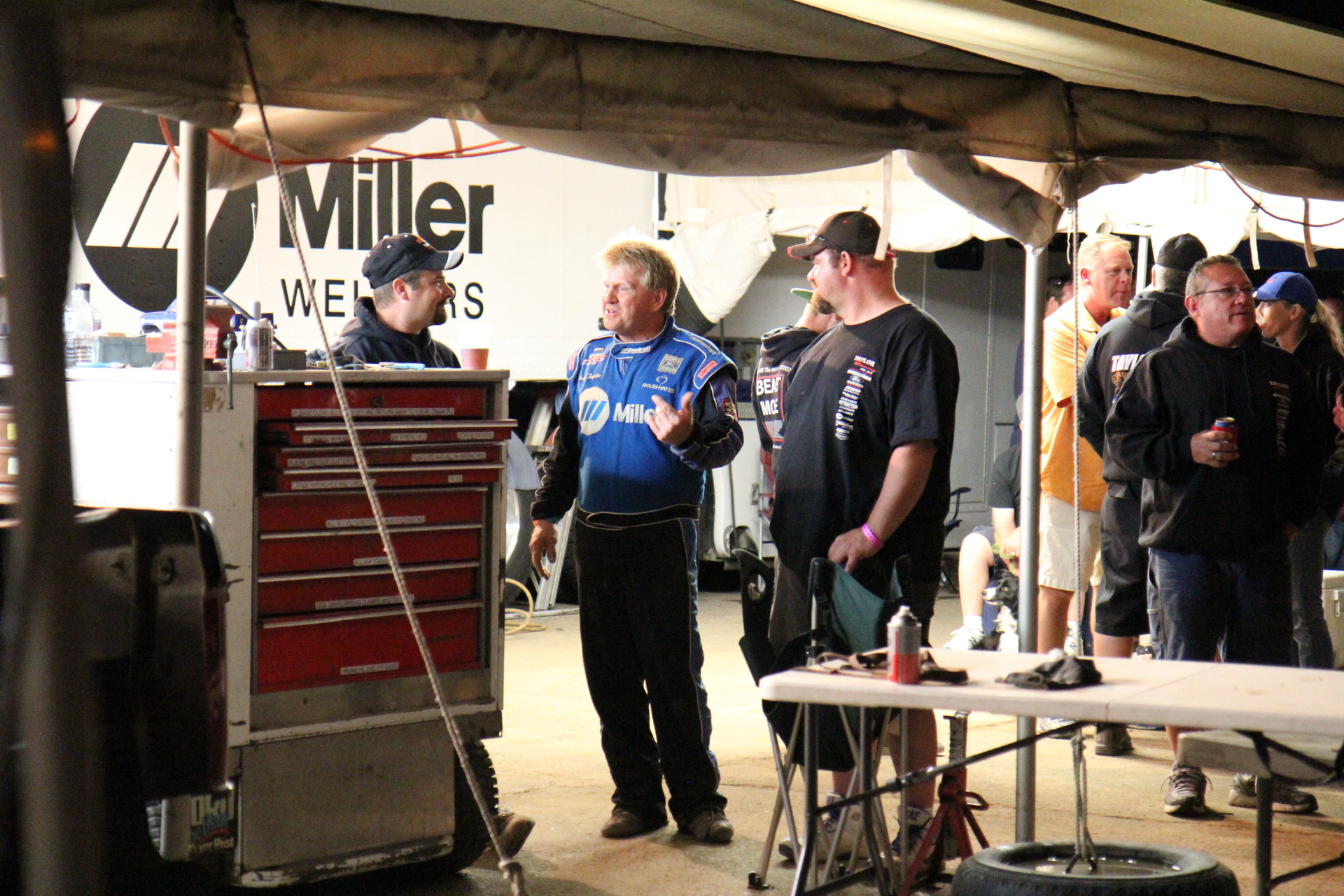
Taylor (in blue) in the pits after his final race at Crandon

In 2012, Taylor said, "I’m going to do a real cool farewell tour next year with garments celebrating all the sponsors that have been with me. I still love racing, but after 40 years, it’s enough. There are other things I want to do in life." Taylor made his final start in the Heavy Metal Challenge race at the September Crandon Weekend.

== Businessman ==
In 1984, Taylor opened Taylor Off-Road Racing in Belvidere. The company manufacturers racing parts.

== Personal life ==
Taylor raced as a privateer racer with a limited budget and his family is a part of his pit crew. His wife Kellie is the team coordinator; He has two daughters Hannah and Karlie.

== Awards ==
Crandon International Off-Road Raceway awarded him the 2012 Jack Flannery Award. He was the second recipient of the award.
