= World Series of Off-Road Racing =

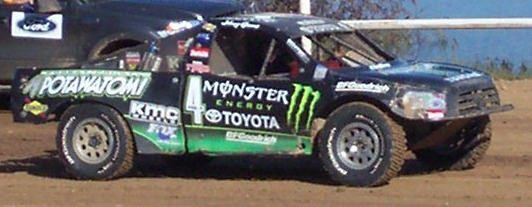
2007 Pro 4x4 champion Johnny Greaves

The Lucas Oil World Series of Off-Road Racing (WSORR) was an American off-road racing series. The series began in 2007 and it ended after the 2008 season.

== Classes ==
WSORR sanctioned classes from Trophy Trucks down to grassroots racers. Feature classes included high performance, high power Trophy race trucks in 4x4, 2WD and compact pickup truck configurations.

== Tracks ==
- Bark River International Raceway (2007, 2008)
- Crandon International Off-Road Raceway (2007, 2008)
- Lucas Oil Speedway (2007, 2008)
- Sunnyview Expo Center (2008)
- Steele County Fairgrounds (2007)

== Champions ==
=== PRO 4x4 ===
- 2008 Kent Brascho
- 2007 Johnny Greaves

=== PRO 2WD ===
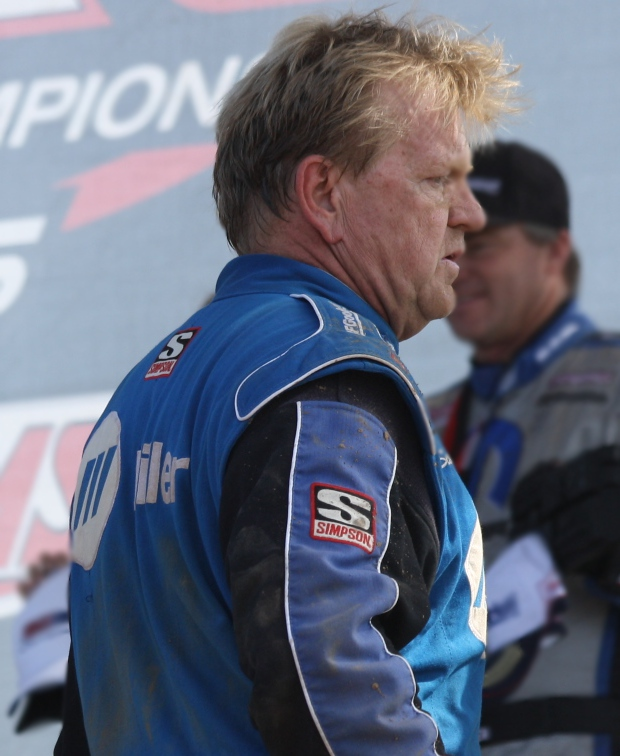
2007 Pro 2WD champion Scott Taylor, pictured in 2012

- 2008 Dan Vanden Heuvel, Sr.
- 2007 Scott Taylor

=== PRO Light ===
- 2008 Jeff Kincaid
- 2007 Chad Hord

=== SRT Super Truck ===
- 2008 Keith Steele
- 2007 Ben Wandahsega

=== PRO Super Buggy ===
- 2008 John Mason
- 2007 Gary Nierop

=== SRT Stock Truck ===
- 2008 Eric Ruppel
- 2007 Scott Beauchamp

=== SRT 1600 Buggy ===
- 2008 Mark Steinhardt
- 2007 John Fitzgerald

=== SRT 1600 Light ===
- 2008 Mike Vanden Heuvel
- 2007 Jamie Kleikamp

=== SRT Formula 4x4 ===
- 2008 Dave DeMaegd
- 2007 Dave DeMaegd

=== Grassroots Classix ===
- 2008 Rob Weiland

=== Grassroots Enduro ===
- 2008 Jim Van Rixel

== Television ==
WSORR events were shown tape delayed on American television on Speed Channel and on Motors TV in Europe. VERSUS broadcast some of the events.
