= Macon Speedway =

Racetrack in Illinois, USA

Coordinates: 39.712073°N 89.006853°W

Macon Speedway, located in Macon, Illinois is one of Illinois's premier dirt ovals. It is also one of the longest continuously-operating racetracks in the state.

== History ==
Macon Speedway was built in 1946 by Wayne Webb on the site of a brick factory on Macon's West side. It has been in continuous operation since its inception. The facilities have undergone many changes over the years, but the track's size has remained the same since it was first constructed. The track's length has been stated as both 1/4 (.25) mile and 1/5 (.20) mile at different times. It has been touted as "The World's fastest 1/5 mile dirt track" for many years. It was also formerly known as "The Other Brickyard" — "Other" being a reference to the Indianapolis Motor Speedway's nickname, and "Brickyard" due to buried bricks rising up to the track's surface from time to time. Many famous drivers who compete on dirt tracks have been to Macon at one time or another.

=== Webb era ===
Macon Speedway remained in the Webb family for many years. Wayne Webb and his brother Lloyd ran Macon under the promotional name of Webb Enterprises, which also held other events at other venues, such as demolition derbies at county fairs in the surrounding area. The Webbs hosted the most varied programs in the track's 60+ year history. Almost every kind of motor-vehicle race, from USAC Midgets and Sprints, to unsanctioned Outlaw Late Model races, were held there. Figure-8 races were also held at Macon Speedway, which accounted for the track's unique triangle-shaped judges' stand. Many "weird" events were held in Macon's past, such as a "Roundy-round Demo Derby" in which contestants had to make a certain number of laps, but also had to make contact with another automobile between the fourth corner and the finish line. Another unique event was a "Headlight Demo Derby." In that event, the track lights were extinguished, and the entrants had to compete with only the headlights on their cars; to be declared the winner, the entrant had to eliminate all other cars, while still having operable headlights. Macon also played host to many long-duration events, such as 75-lap features for the Street Cars (later to become Sportsman, and still later UMP Sportsman). Three-hour-long and/or 300-lap "Enduro" races were also held there.

One of the more notable events in Macon's history was the Herald & Review 100 for UMP Late Models. This race became one of the premier races in the Midwest. With its $10,000 purse, it drew big names in Late Model racing from all over the US.

=== Track Enterprises era ===
Local promoter Bob Sargent leased Macon Speedway in 1985, and immediately aligned Macon with the newly formed United Midwestern Promoters. This partnership lasted many years, until UMP became unstable in the late 1990s. Sargent and Track Enterprises made Macon a premier track to race at in the Midwest. With its UMP affiliation, Macon was the site of a significant share of big purse races. Drivers including Gary Webb, Scott Bloomquist, Ken Schrader and Billy Moyer and Jim Leka have won big-purse races hosted by the Macon Speedway. Macon in 1994 would switch to the NASCAR Winston Racing Series for sanctioning of their weekly racing programs, with the exception of the annual Herald & Review 100 which was UMP Sanctioned as part of the UMP Summer Nationals tour. The move was in part to join in on the extremely vast amount of money that RJ Reynolds was putting into all of motorsports at that time.

=== 1998 to today ===
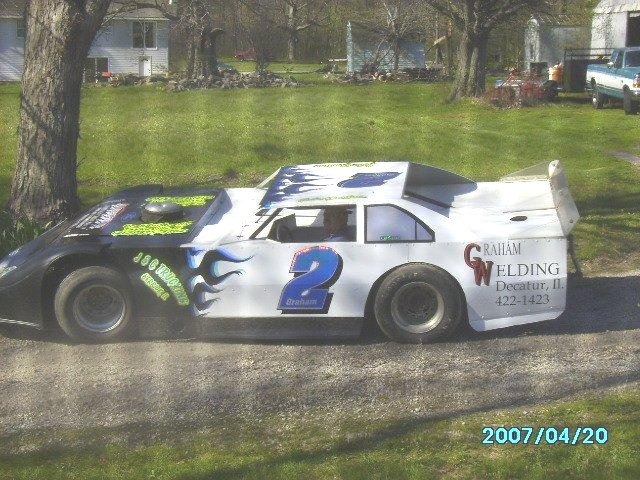
2007 UMP Late Model

In 1998, Track Enterprises sold Macon Speedway to investors. Macon would continue their partnership with NASCAR's Winston Racing Series, and a year later, Macon's top class, Late Models, was dropped, forcing many of the area's (and some of the nation's) top drivers to search for an alternate venue.

In 2001, Macon once again re-aligned itself with UMP, after the speedway was bought back by the Webb family in the name of founder Wayne Webb's son — and former driver at Macon — Rich Webb. Macon Speedway closed its 2006 season early, due to high operating expenses insufficiently offset by box office returns, advertising and other revenue. On the last night of promotions at Macon Speedway in 2006, however, 100 race cars showed up for the final race of the season.

In 2007 Macon Speedway was sold again. Former Macon Speedway owner Bob Sargent of Track Enterprises teamed up with NASCAR stars Ken Schrader, Kenny Wallace, and Tony Stewart as co-owners of Macon Speedway. Some noticeable were incorporated into Macon Speedway's infrastructure, including new catch-fencing, repairing grandstands, the addition of new billboards along the backstretch, and the acquisition of 12 acres (49,000 m^{2}) of adjacent farmland that was converted into a larger pit area for the racers. Those improvements, along with 3 nights of racing that included NASCAR race drivers, helped draw sell-out crowds for each special NASCAR night for the 2007 season as well as helping draw in a few more local racers at that time. The 2008 season included many of the same big races, as well as a new crowd draw, rides in Macon Speedway's new 2-seater Late Model Race Car.

In November 2022, Wild West Shootout promoter Chris Kearns bought the racetrack.

The track currently runs UMP Modifieds, UMP Pro Crate Late Models, UMP B-Mods, UMP Street Stocks, UMP Hornets as weekly classes with Super Late Models (Lucas Oil, UMP), UMP Sportsman, Midgets (POWRi), Division II Midgets/Lighting Sprints (POWRi), and 410 Winged Sprint Cars (MOWA) making visits spread out throughout the season.

== Notable regional and national accomplishments ==
Macon has been the home track of several National Champions over the years, most notably 1999 NASCAR Heartland Regional, NASCAR Winston Racing Series Champion, and NASCAR Winston Racing Series National Champion, Jeff Leka. Macon was also the home track of the 1989 UMP National Champion, as well as the home track of the 1998 Heartland Regional NASCAR ShorTrack Series Champion. In 2007, Macon Speedway was host to Speed TV's show "Night of NASCAR Stars."

Notable former weekly drivers who have accomplished national accolades include:

- Shannon Babb (2nd winningiest driver in DIRTcar UMP Summer Nationals history (97), 4x Summer Nationals series champion, 2x Dirt Track World Championship Winner)
- Justin Allgaier (2008 ARCA Re/Max Series Champion, Xfinity Series winner)
- Jim Leka (1989 UMP Late Model National Champion)
- Jeff Leka (1999 NASCAR Winston Racing Series Overall Champion (Modified), 2008 UMP Modified National Champion )
- Brian Shirley (2006 Knoxville Late Model Nationals winner, World of Outlaws Late Model Series touring driver)
- Brandon Sheppard (2017 World of Outlaws Late Model Series champion, 2x Dirt Track World Championship Winner, 2015 Lucas Oil Late Model Dirt Series Rookie of the Year)

== Classes of racing ==
=== Current classes ===
UMP Modifieds

UMP Sportsman

UMP Street Stocks

UMP Hornets

UMP B-Modifieds

UMP Pro (Crate) Late Models

UMP and Lucas Oil Late Model Dirt Series Super Late Models (4-5 total events per season)

POWRi Midgets (Multiple special shows throughout the racing season)

POWRi Division II Midgets (formerly Lightning Sprints)

600cc Winged Outlaw Micro Sprints (POWRi & Unsanctioned)

410 Winged Sprint Cars (Built FORD Tough MOWA Sprint Car Series delivered by Morrow Brothers Ford, twice a year)

=== Former classes ===
- NMMRO Mini-Sprints
- Bombers
- Mini-Stocks
- Street Cars
- "Outlaw" Late Models
- Winged Late Models
- Sprint Cars
- USAC Midgets
- Super Stocks
- 6-Cylinders

== Track record ==
The 1 lap track record in Late Model qualifying is 10.228 seconds posted by Billy Moyer of Batesville, Arkansas on May 10, 2015 during the 2nd Annual St. Louis U Pic A Part 100 Lucas Oil Late Model Dirt Series event. The previous record of 10.311 seconds was set by Kyle Logue of Cisco, Illinois, on May 10, 2008.

== See also ==
- List of auto racing tracks in the United States
- Racing in Illinois
