= World Racing Group =

Sport governing body

- Sport: Dirt track racing
- Jurisdiction: United States; Canada
- Abbreviation: WRG
- Founded: 2003
- Regional affiliation: United States
- Headquarters: Concord, North Carolina, U.S.
- President: Brian Carter

Official website
- worldracinggroup.com

World Racing Group, Inc. (WRG) is a licensing, sanctioning and promotional organization aligned with oval dirt track auto racing. Through its World of Outlaws and DIRTcar brands, WRG supports individual races and racetracks, and also operates national touring series.

== Overview ==
World Racing Group sanctions local and regional dirt track racing events in the United States and Canada under the DIRTcar Racing brand. WRG also produces and broadcasts its races on the company's streaming platform, DIRTVision. Additionally, WRG owns and operates Volusia Speedway Park in Barberville FL, and presents several national touring series: World of Outlaws Sprint Car Series, World of Outlaws Late Model Series, Super DIRTcar Series, Xtreme Outlaws Midget Series, DIRTcar Summer Nationals Tour, and American Sprint Car Series.

== History ==
Norman, Oklahoma businessman Paul Kruger purchased the financially troubled World of Outlaws touring series in 2001, and took the company public in October 2003 as Boundless Motorsports Inc. Kruger proceeded to purchase Dirt Motorsports, a New York state based sanctioning and promotional company that operated touring series, as well as owned or controlled management of the Canandaigua Speedway, Orange County Fair Speedway in Middletown NY, Rolling Wheels Raceway in Elbridge NY, and the Weedsport Speedway. The assets included the video production company DIRT-TV. Boundless soon introduced a national touring series for Late Models, acquired the United Midwestern Promoters/Xtreme Dirt Car Series (UMP) and the Mid America Racing Series (MARS), as well as purchased the Lernerville Speedway in Sarver PA, and the Volusia Speedway Park.

In 2007 the company was restructured to do business as the World Racing Group, and a new management team was bought in to replace Kruger. As part of the make-over UMP was rebranded as DIRTcar and referred to as DIRTcar Midwest division, while the New York based operations became DIRTcar Northeast. By 2009, WRG had divested from ownership of MARS (later rebranded the Midwest Auto Racing Series), although it continued to sanction the series with DIRTcar. In another change to its business model, between 2013 and 2015 WRG sold off its racetracks, retaining only the Barberville, Florida facility.

In 2021 WRG unveiled the Xtreme Outlaw Midget Series and Xtreme Outlaw Sprint Car Series. In 2024 WRG added the American Sprint Car Series to its portfolio; the national series for 360 sprint cars had been founded by Emmett Hahn in 1992.

== DIRTcar Northeast ==
The groundwork for DIRT Motorsports began in 1970 when Glenn Donnelly bought the 3/8 mile Weedsport Speedway, located 26 miles from Syracuse, New York. Donnelly joined forces with other speedway promoters to form Drivers Independent Race Tracks (DIRT) with the idea of bringing rules uniformity and increased sponsorship to modified stock car racing at Upstate New York dirt tracks.

Donnelly sold the organization to Boundless Motorsports in 2003, and within two years Boundless took DIRT Motorsports, Inc. as its corporate name and began doing business as World Racing Group. The former Donnelly organization then became known as DIRT Northeast, and later DIRTcar Northeast.

== DIRTcar Midwest ==
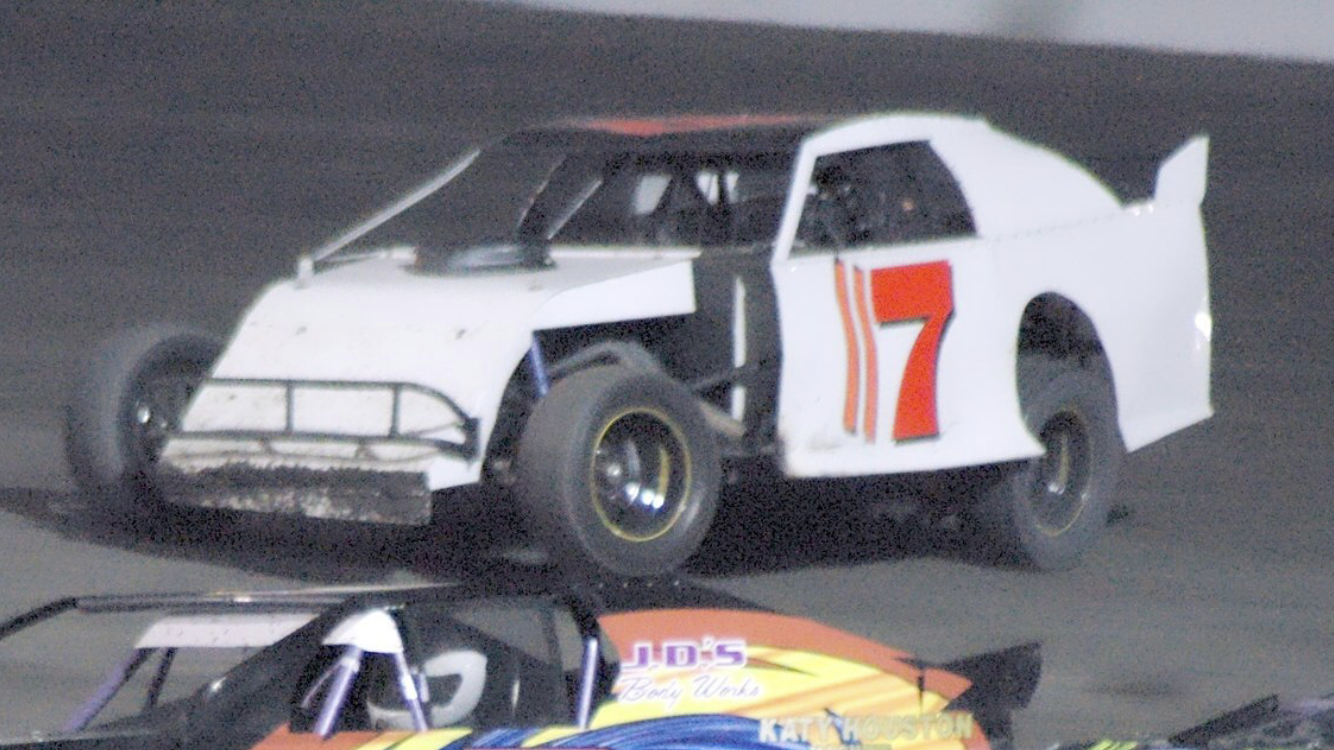
Brennan Poole in a UMP Modified at Houston Raceway Park in 2008.

United Midwestern Promoters was a short track motor racing sanctioning body in the United States created in 1984 by Bob Memmer. Memmer redefined the landscape of Late Model racing, putting in place a standardized package of technical specifications to govern some of the biggest Late Model races in the country.

In late 2002, the organization was bought by Ken Schrader, Bob Sargent, Robert Lawton and Howard Commander. In late 2004, UMP merged with Doug Bland's Xtreme Dirt Car Series and was bought by WRG.

In 2007 WRG rebranded UMP as DIRTcar, referring to it as DIRTcar Midwest division to distinguish it from WRG's New York operations.

=== UMP/DIRTcar Late Model National champions ===
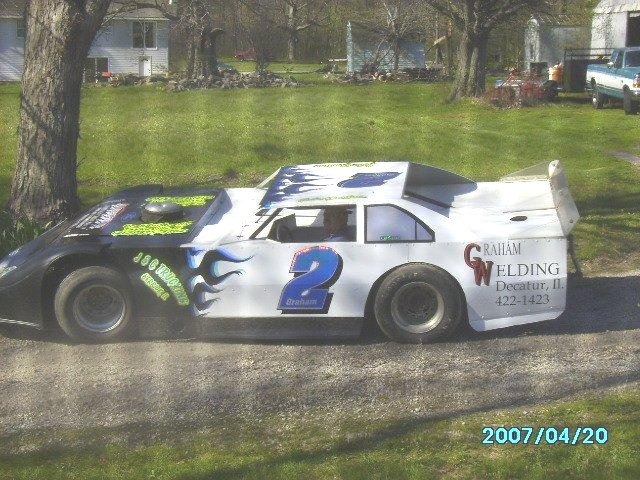
A 2007 UMP Late Model

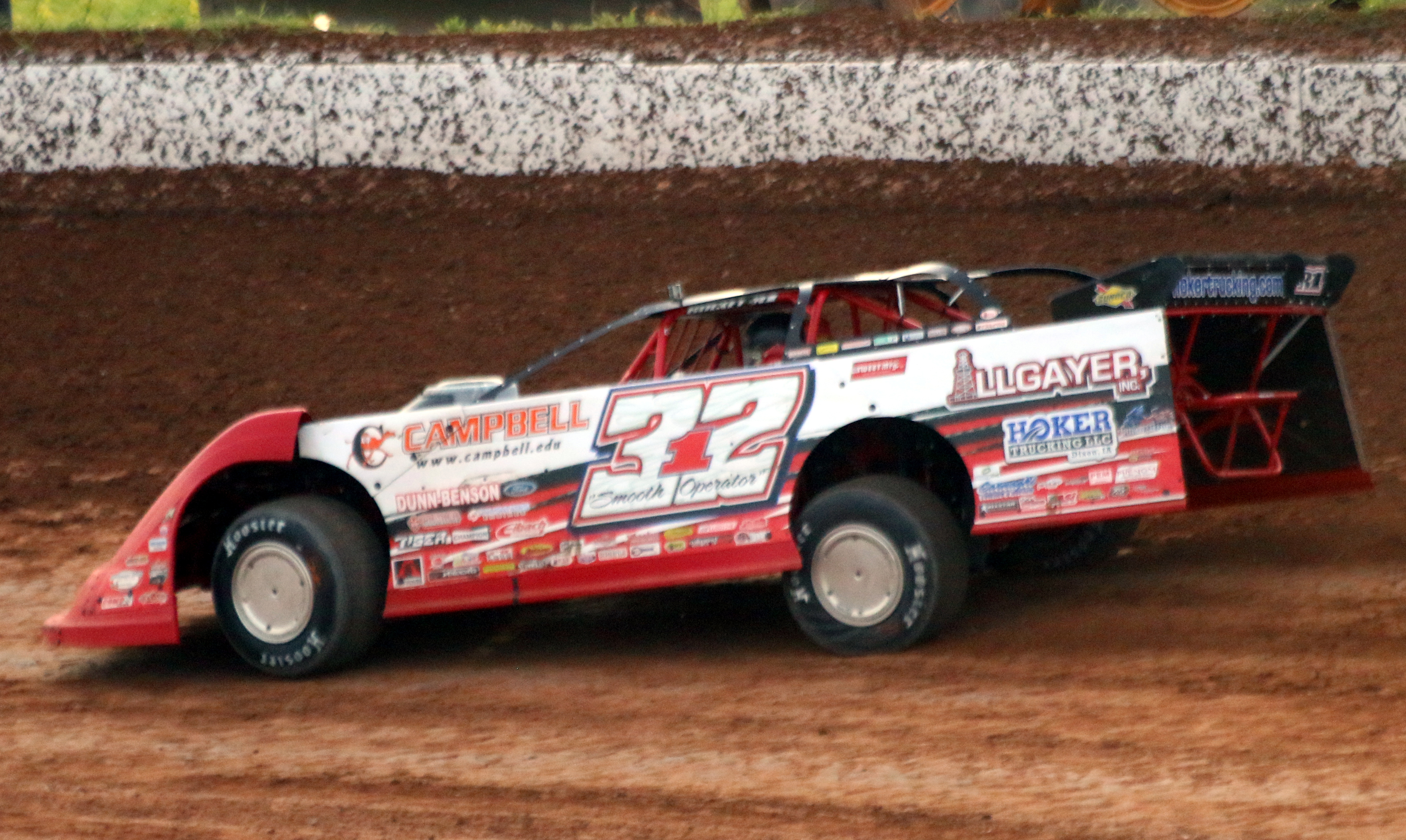
2018 DIRTcar Late Model

Year: Champion; Hometown	Year: Champion; Hometown
1984 Gary Webb; Blue Grass, Iowa	2009 Jason Feger; Bloomington, Illinois
1985 Gary Webb; Blue Grass, Iowa	2010 Rusty Schlenk; Jackson, Michigan
1986 John Gill; Mitchell, Indiana	2011 Ryan Unzicker; El Paso, Illinois
1987 John Gill; Mitchell, Indiana	2012 Brian Shirley; Chatham, Illinois
1988 Jim Curry; Norman, Indiana	2013 Brandon Sheppard; New Berlin, Illinois
1989 Jim Leka; Buffalo, Illinois	2014 Bobby Pierce; Oakwood, Illinois
1990 Bob Pierce; Danville, Illinois	2015 Bobby Pierce; Oakwood, Illinois
1991 Kevin Claycomb; Vincennes, Indiana	2016 Bobby Pierce; Oakwood, Illinois
1992 Kevin Weaver; Gibson City, Illinois	2017 Rusty Schlenk; McClure, Ohio
1993 Randy Sellars; Mayfield, Kentucky	2018 Rusty Schlenk; McClure, Ohio
1994 Ed Dixon; Washington, Missouri	2019: Brian Shirley; Chatham, Illinois
1995 Tony Izzo Jr.; Bridgeview, Illinois	2020: Brian Shirley; Chatham, Illinois
1996 Donnie Tudor; Shawneetown, Illinois	2021 Bobby Pierce; Oakwood, Illinois
1997 Randy Korte; Highland, Illinois	2022 Bobby Pierce; Oakwood, Illinois
1998 Mark Faust; Breese, Illinois	2023 Jason Ferger; Bloomington, Illinois
1999 Ed Dixon; Washington, Missouri	2024 Jason Ferger; Bloomington, Illinois
2000 Ed Dixon; Washington, Missouri	2025 Jason Ferger; Bloomington, Illinois
2001 Rodney Melvin; Benton, Illinois	
2002 Terry English; Benton, Kentucky	
2003 Rodney Melvin; Benton, Illinois	
2004 Rodney Melvin; Benton, Illinois	
2005 Rodney Melvin; Benton, Illinois	
2006 Randy Korte; Highland, Illinois	
2007 Dennis Erb Jr.; Carpentersville, Illinois	
2008 Dennis Erb Jr.; Carpentersville, Illinois	

=== UMP/DIRTcar Summer Nationals Champions ===
Year: Champion, Hometown	Year: Champion, Hometown	Year: Champion, Hometown
1986: John Gill, Mitchell, IN.	2001: Billy Moyer, Batesville, AR.	2016: Bobby Pierce, Oakwood, IL.
1987: Rick Standridge, Divernon, IL.	2002: Scott Bloomquist, Mooresburg, TN.	2017: Bobby Pierce, Oakwood, IL
1988: Pete Parker, Kaukauna, WI.	2003: Billy Moyer, Batesville, AR.	2018: Brian Shirley, Chatham, IL.
1989: John Gill, Mitchell, IN.	2004: Don O'Neal, Martinsville, IN.	2019: Brian Shirley, Chatham, IL.
1990: Scott Bloomquist, Mooresburg, TN.	2005: Shannon Babb, Moweaqua, IL.	2020: Brian Shirley, Chatham, IL.
1991: Scott Bloomquist, Mooresburg, TN.	2006: Shannon Babb, Moweaqua, IL.	2021: Bobby Pierce, Oakwood, IL.
1992: Bob Pierce, Danville, IL.	2007: Dennis Erb Jr., Carpentersville, IL.	2022: Bobby Pierce, Oakwood, IL
1993: Billy Moyer, Batesville, AR.	2008: Dennis Erb Jr., Carpentersville, IL.	2023: Ashton Winger, Senoia, GA
1994: Billy Moyer, Batesville, AR.	2009: Dennis Erb Jr., Carpentersville, IL.	2024: Tyler Erb, Magnolia, TX
1995: Bob Pierce, Danville, IL.	2010: Jason Feger, Bloomington, IL.	2025: Jason Ferger, Bloomington, IL
1996: Billy Moyer, Batesville, AR.	2011: Shannon Babb, Moweaqua, IL.	
1997: Rick Aukland, Fargo, ND.	2012: Brian Shirley, Chatham, IL.	
1998: Rick Aukland, Fargo, ND.	2013: Brandon Sheppard, New Berlin, IL.	
1999: Billy Moyer, Batesville, AR.	2014: Shannon Babb, Moweaqua, IL.	
2000: Kevin Weaver, Gibson City, IL.	2015: Bobby Pierce, Oakwood, IL.	
