= David Hamilton =

David, Dave, or Davey Hamilton may refer to:

== Film and media ==
- David Hamilton (broadcaster) (born 1938), British broadcaster
- David Hamilton (Canadian producer), Canadian film producer
- David Hamilton (photographer) (1933–2016), British photographer and film director
- David Hamilton (born 1939), writer and former editor of The Iowa Review

== Government ==
- David Hamilton (British politician) (born 1950), Scottish MP
- David Hamilton (Canadian politician) (born 1949), county administrator for Hernando County, Florida, US and mayor of Thunder Bay, Ontario, Canada
- David Hamilton (judge) (born 1957), American judge

== Music ==
- David Hamilton (composer) (born 1955), New Zealand contemporary composer
- David Hamilton (tenor) (born 1960), Scottish-born Australian operatic tenor
- Dave Hamilton (musician) (1920–1994), American musician with The Funk Brothers, and record producer

== Sports ==
- Dave Hamilton (baseball) (born 1947), American baseball pitcher
- Davey Hamilton (born 1962), American race car driver
- Davey Hamilton Jr. (born 1997), American race car driver, son of the above
- David Hamilton (baseball), (born 1997), American baseball infielder
- David Hamilton (footballer) (born 1960), English footballer
- Davie Hamilton (1882–1950), Scottish footballer
- Davy Hamilton, lawn bowler from Northern Ireland

== Other ==
- David Hamilton of Cadzow (c. 1333 – c. 1392), 3rd Laird of Cadzow, Scottish nobleman
- David Hamilton (architect) (1768–1843), Scottish architect
- David Hamilton (bishop) (died 1523), bishop of Argyll and Abbot of Dryburgh
- David Hamilton (businessman) (1923–2007), British businessman
- David Hamilton (diarist) (1663–1721), Scottish diarist and doctor to Queen Anne
- David Hamilton (psychologist) (1941-), American social psychologist
- David Henry Hamilton (1843–1929), Texas farmer, businessman, and statesman
- David James Hamilton (1849–1909), Scottish pathologist
- David Osborne Hamilton (1893–1953), American poet
- D. Hamilton Jackson (1884–1946), labor rights advocate in the Danish West Indies and United States Virgin Islands

== See also ==
- David Hamilton Golland (born 1971), American historian
- Andrew D. Hamilton (born 1952), British-American chemist and academic
- Gustaf David Hamilton (1699–1788), Swedish count and soldier
