= Robbie Pierce =

American off-road racer (1959–2023)

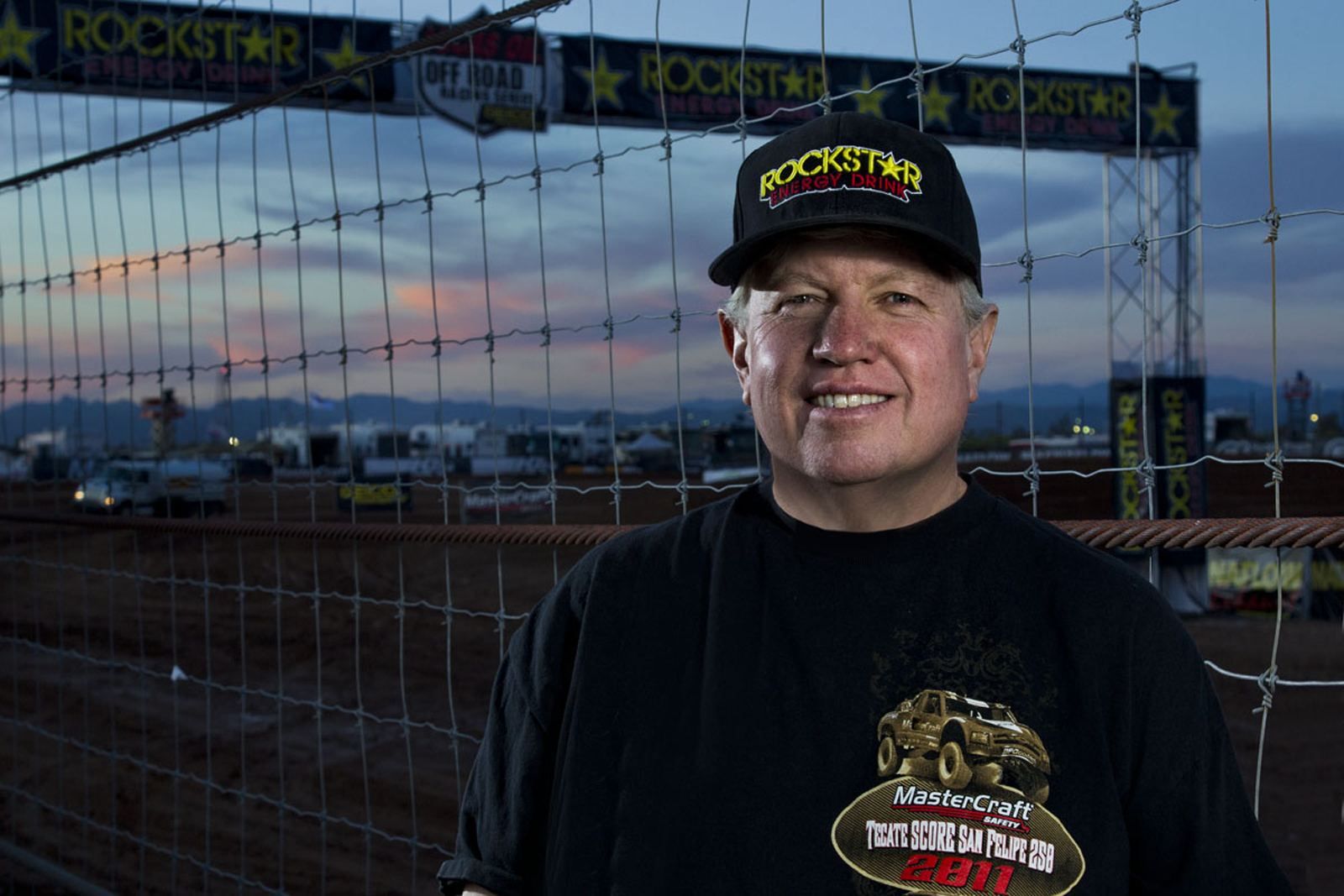
- Pierce at Speedworld for LOORRS racing
- Born: April 29, 1959; San Diego, California, U.S.
- Died: January 3, 2023 (aged 63); Bonaire, Caribbean Netherlands
- Occupations: Business owner, off-road racer

Robert Pierce (April 29, 1959 – January 3, 2023) was an American off-road racer, owner of Jimco Racing, and former owner of MasterCraft Safety and Impact Products. Pierce raced a Jimco Trophy Truck in the SCORE International desert racing series and previously raced a Pro2 Unlimited truck in the Lucas Oil Off Road Racing Series (LOORRS).

== Childhood ==
Pierce was born and raised in the mountains east of San Diego in Southern California, where he was an avid hockey player from the age of 5. In high school, he was scouted by a professional hockey team, but eventually left hockey and moved to Glenns Ferry, Idaho. It was here that Pierce's interest in metal fabrication and machinery blossomed as he worked on heavy machinery used for farming and agriculture. Eventually the pull of family and warm weather drew Pierce back to Southern California.

== Business ==
Pierce put the skills he had acquired in Idaho to use performing welding jobs at his own small business. Much of his work was for the exacting aerospace industry, but starting in 1985 his customers also included MasterCraft. Jack Miller, the founder of MasterCraft, sought out Pierce's welding expertise to manufacture the company's tubular seat frames. In 1999, Pierce purchased MasterCraft from Jack Miller's daughter, Peri.

In 2008, MasterCraft Safety purchased Ryan Safety, expanding their product line of suspension seats, restraints, limit straps, and window nets to include race suits. In 2010 the company expanded even further, acquiring Impact Products from Bill Simpson. Pierce sold Impact and MasterCraft to Italian safety giant Sparco in June 2017.

In 2018, Pierce purchased Jimco Racing of Santee, California.

== Racing career ==
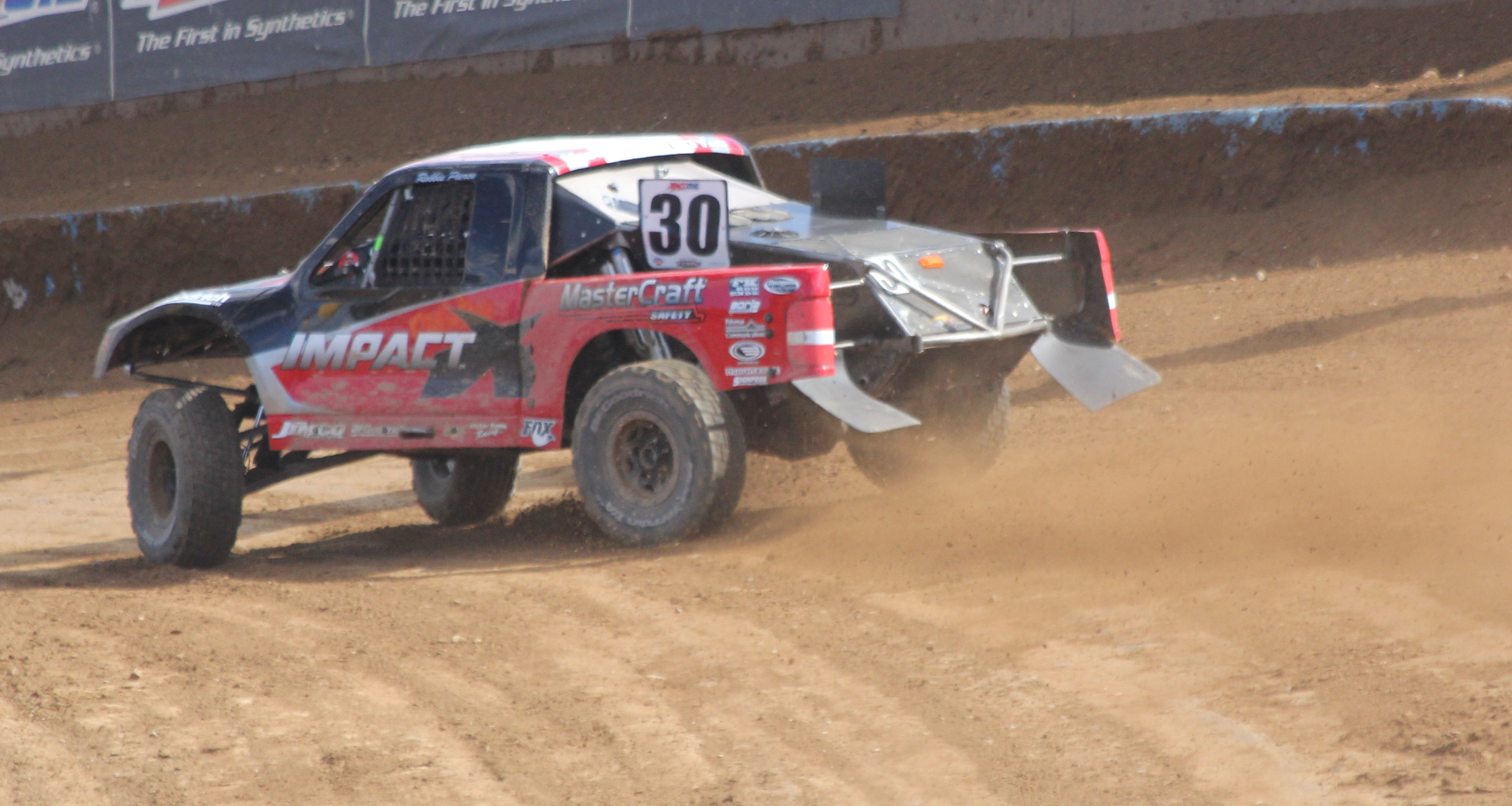
Pierce racing his Pro 2 trophy truck at Crandon in 2013

Pierce did not start desert racing until 2004, instead he focused all of his energy into his burgeoning business. He co-drove the Class 10 car of Tom Ridings in the 2004 Tecate SCORE Baja 500 and was immediately hooked. In 2005 he purchased a ProTruck and his first race as driver-of-record was the 2005 Best In The Desert TSCO Vegas to Reno race. Pierce proved to be a quick study as he finished 11th overall and fifth in class. In 2006 he finished second in class in the Tecate SCORE Baja 500. After a mere three races in the ProTruck Pierce moved up to the Trophy Truck class, a completely unlimited class considered the pinnacle of off-road racing.

Pierce raced a modified ProTruck dubbed the “Prophy” Truck for two races and did surprisingly well considering he was severely outmatched in horsepower. His first race in his current No. 30 Jimco Trophy Truck was the SCORE Laughlin Desert Challenge in 2008, where he finished 5th overall. His best finish to date in second at the Terrible's SCORE Primm 300 in 2010. He finished sixth in SCORE Trophy Truck season points in 2009 and fourth in SCORE Trophy Truck season points in 2010, when he was also named SCORE Person of the Year.

In addition to desert racing, Pierce also began racing short course in the LOORRS halfway through the 2009 season. He went directly into the premier Pro2 Unlimited class in a Johnny Kaiser-built Alpha truck previously raced by Jerry Whelchel for Chet Huffman Motorsports. Despite not racing a full season and a horrific crash at Glen Helen in 2010 that left Pierce with two broken collarbones and a couple of broken ribs, he still finished 15th overall for the season.

== Death ==
While vacationing in Bonaire, Pierce died in a scuba diving accident on January 3, 2023. He was 63.

== Awards ==
- 2010 SCORE International Person of the Year
- 2010 Lucas Oil Off Road Racing Crash of the Year

== Stadium Super Trucks results ==
(key) (Bold – Pole position. Italics – Fastest qualifier. * – Most laps led.)

Stadium Super Trucks results
Year	1	2	3	4	5	6	7	8	9	10	11	12	13	14	15	16	17	18	19	20	21	22	SSTC	Pts	Ref
2014	STP	STP	LBH	IMS; 9	IMS; 8	DET	DET	DET	AUS	TOR	TOR	OCF	OCF	CSS	LVV	LVV							21st	25	
2016	**ADE**; 9	ADE; 9	ADE; 11	STP	STP	LBH	LBH	DET	DET	DET	TOW	TOW	TOW	TOR	TOR	CLT	CLT	OCF	OCF	SRF	SRF	SRF	18th	62	
