= Burt Jenner =

American businessman and off-road racing driver

- Born: Burton William Jenner; September 6, 1978 (age 48)
- Education: Malibu High School
- Occupations: Businessman; off-road racing driver
- Employer: West LA Dogs
- Television: Octane Academy
- Partner: Valerie Pitalo (2009-present)
- Children: 4
- Parents: Caitlyn Jenner (Note: Caitlyn fathered Burt prior to her gender transition); Chrystie Scott (née Crownover)
- Relatives: Brandon Jenner (half-brother); Brody Jenner (half-brother); Kendall Jenner (half-sister); Kylie Jenner (half-sister)

Burton William Jenner (born September 6, 1978) is an American businessman, owner of West LA Dogs, and a professional off-road racing driver. He is the eldest son of television personality and Olympic gold medalist Caitlyn Jenner and her first wife Chrystie Scott.

== Early life ==
Jenner was born on September 6, 1978 to Chrystie Scott (née Crownover) and Olympic decathlete Caitlyn Jenner. Burt is named after Caitlyn's brother, who was killed in a car accident. He has one full-sister, Casey. His parents divorced in 1981. Caitlyn later remarried twice, and Burt gained half-siblings Brandon Jenner, Brody Jenner, Kendall Jenner, and Kylie Jenner. His step-siblings included members of the Kardashian family through Caitlyn's marriage to Kris Jenner. Jenner has said that after Caitlyn remarried they had a strained relationship, as she was not always present. He blamed Kris Jenner for changing his relationship with Caitlyn, but later apologized and now speaks with her regularly. He has stated that he and his sister, Casey, were not invited to participate in Keeping Up with the Kardashians. Jenner later appeared on four episodes of Keeping Up with the Kardashians and one episode of Call Me Cait.

In the 1980s, Burt's parent, Caitlyn Jenner raced professionally for Jack Roush in the International Motor Sports Association. Burt grew up watching Caitlyn race and developed his own love for racing. Caitlyn introduced him to go-karts at age seven, which quickly replaced downhill skiing as his favorite sport.

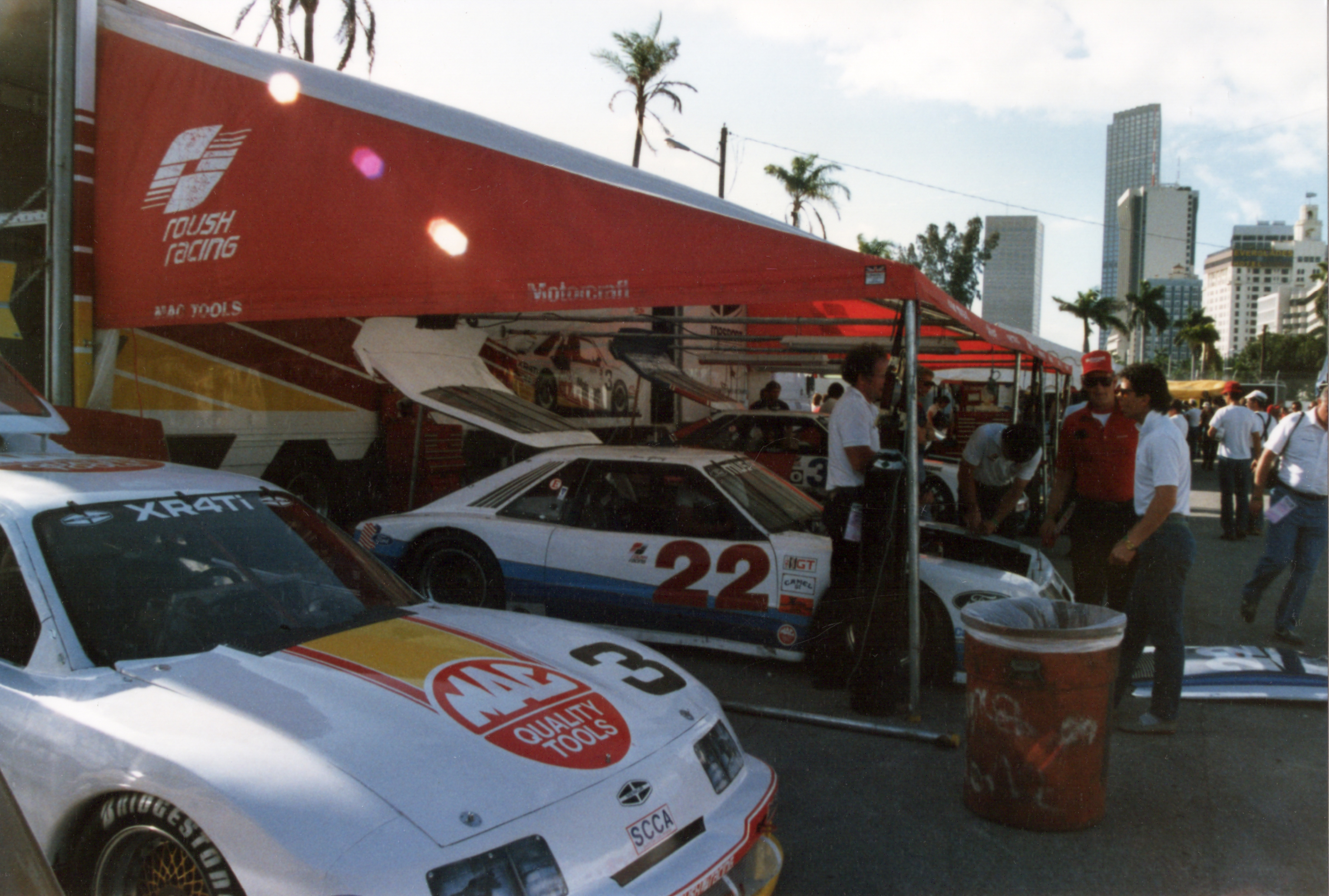
In the background, the #33 Mustang driven by Burt's parent, Caitlyn Jenner in 1987

== Career ==
=== West LA Dogs ===
In his early 30s, Jenner was broke when he decided to become a dog walker. Jenner was a pit bull advocate, and because of his comfort in working with pit bulls, he began to attract clients who wanted him to assist them in socializing their dogs. Jenner began illegally housing his clients' dogs when they were away, at one point hosting seventy-three dogs over a Christmas holiday out of his two-bedroom cottage. After winning $100,000 on season two of Octane Academy, the largest amount of money Jenner had ever earned, he invested it in a legitimate dog boarding business, which he called "West LA Dogs". West LA Dogs is located in a 14,000 square foot facility. Not wanting to ask Caitlyn to co-sign the lease, Jenner used his entire $100,000 winnings as a down payment for the facility and began living at the facility with his girlfriend, Valerie Pitalo. It was profitable eighteen months later. West LA Dogs provides organic food, and owners can pay for their dog to stay in private suites with human beds and flat-screen TVs.

=== Racing ===
When he was sixteen, Caitlyn gave him an old racing kart. Jenner unsuccessfully attempted to start a career through attending racing schools, including Skip Barber Racing. In 2011, Jenner watched the first season of Octane Academy, a racing competition show by Ford Performance, and realized he could beat all of the contestants on the show. Later, Burt went to audition for the show at the California Speedway. He waited in line for nine hours and was one of the last people to audition. After his audition, Jenner was chosen for the show and was later the winner of season two of Octane Academy, earning $100,000, which he put toward his business, West LA Dogs. In August 2013, Burt and Caitlyn raced alongside each other in the Lamborghini Super Trofeo Series.

Jenner is sponsored by Gladiator Tires. In 2014, Jenner raced in five Stadium Super Trucks events, placing third in Las Vegas during his final event of 2014. His third place win in Las Vegas was his first podium finish of his career. He participated in the 2014 Baja 1000 alongside Caitlyn Jenner. They competed as part of Potts Racing Team, driving a customized trophy truck. After crashing their truck three times, they pulled out of the race.

In 2015, Jenner placed in four events, with three wins. His first win of 2015 was in St. Petersburg, Florida. In May 2015, Jenner won the SPEED Energy Formula Off-Road Series truck race on Belle Isle. Jenner also received the trophy for the overall winner for the three-race weekend.

In 2016, Jenner finished first in the second race of the season opener at the Adelaide Street Circuit in Australia. During the race, Matt Mingay nearly landed on Jenner during a rollover, but Jenner went on to win the race.

In April 2017, Jenner joined AF Racing, making his debut for the team in the Red Bull Global Rallycross Lites in Memphis. In the first round of the Rallycross Lites, Jenner placed 10th. After completing eight places, Jenner was disqualified.

==== X Games ====
In the X Games Austin 2014, Jenner placed 13th in TRK Racing. Jenner qualified second for the X Games Austin 2015 and was on the front row. Early in the race, another driver spun him out, and Jenner could not make up the lost time. Jenner placed sixth in the 2015 games.

== Personal life ==
Jenner has four children with his partner, Valerie Pitalo. His first son, Bodhi Burton Jenner, was born in July 2016. William Behr Jenner, Burt's second son, was born in February 2019. His daughter, Goldie Brooklyn Jenner, was born in March 2022 and his fourth child, a son, Baker Ford Jenner, was born in September 2025. Jenner has a vacation home near Lake Tahoe. Jenner has been homeless twice. Jenner once volunteered to spend a week in an L.A. County jail because he could not afford $15,000 in accumulated traffic fines. He is a supporter of the LGBT community and defended Caitlyn Jenner during her transition, and made an appearance on Caitlyn's Diane Sawyer interview.

== Motorsports career results ==
=== Stadium Super Trucks ===
(key) (Bold – Pole position. Italics – Fastest qualifier. * – Most laps led.)

Stadium Super Trucks results
Year	1	2	3	4	5	6	7	8	9	10	11	12	13	14	15	16	17	18	19	20	21	22	SSTC	Pts	Ref
2014	STP	STP	LBH	IMS; 7	IMS; 9	DET; 5	DET; 7	DET; 4	AUS; 13	TOR	TOR	OCF; 4	OCF; 11	CSS; 4	LVV; 3	LVV; 11							6th	207	
2015	ADE	ADE	ADE	STP; 5	STP; 1*	LBH	DET; 3*	DET; 3	DET; 1*	AUS; 6	TOR	TOR	OCF; 9	OCF; 2	OCF; 3	SRF; 1*	SRF; 6	SRF; 9	SRF; 4	SYD; 11	MGM; 2	MGM; 10	4th	399	
2016	ADE; 8	ADE; 1	ADE; 5	STP	STP	LBH	LBH	DET; 12	DET	DET	TOW	TOW	TOW	TOR	TOR	CLT	CLT	OCF	OCF	SRF	SRF	SRF	17th	73	
2017	ADE	ADE	ADE	STP	STP	LBH	LBH	PER	PER	PER	DET	DET	TEX	TEX	HID	HID	HID	BEI	GLN	GLN	ELS; 6	ELS; DNQ	26th	25	
