= Davey Hamilton =

American racing driver

- Hamilton at Madera Speedway in 2026
- Nationality: (United States) American
- Born: David Jay Hamilton; June 13, 1962 (age 64) Nampa, Idaho, U.S.

Indy Racing League IndyCar Series
- Years active: 1996–2001, 2007–2011
- Teams: Dreyer & Reinbold Racing de Ferran Dragon Racing; Vision Racing; Sam Schmidt Motorsports; TeamXtreme; Galles Racing; Nienhouse Motorsports; A. J. Foyt Enterprises
- Starts: 56
- Wins: 0
- Poles: 0
- Best finish: 2nd in 1996–1997, 1998

Previous series
- 2013–2014, 2016 1991, 1993, 1995 1995: Stadium Super Trucks; CART IndyCar; Indy Lights

Awards
- 2001: Scott Brayton Award

David Jay Hamilton (born June 13, 1962, in Nampa, Idaho) is a race car driver who competed in the Indy Racing League IndyCar Series and Stadium Super Trucks. He has made 56 series starts and while never winning a race, finished second three times. He placed second in series points in the 1996–1997 season and again in 1998 season.

Hamilton had been proficient in supermodified racing, as a frequent winner in various supermodified races, usually held in the northern areas of the United States.

== Early career ==
Hamilton's IndyCar career started in 1991. His father Ken traded the Eagle Aircraft Flyer Special he attempted to qualify at the 1982 Indianapolis 500 for a rookie test with Hemelgarn Racing for Davey.

Hamilton attempted to qualify for the Indy 500 in 1991, 1993 and 1995. He made his first IndyCar start at the 1996 Indy 200 at Walt Disney World, the first ever Indy Racing League race.

== Accident ==
In 2001 at the Texas Motor Speedway, Jeret Schroeder lost an engine exiting turn 2. This caused him to lose control of his car and make contact with Davey Hamilton's machine. Hamilton's car slammed into the wall, nearly getting caught in the catch fence, and beginning to spin a number of times before coming to rest against the inside retaining wall. Also involved in the crash was Sarah Fisher. Hamilton suffered such severe injuries to his legs and feet, that doctors at one time believed that amputation would be the best option for him.

After the crash, Hamilton took a retirement from driving, and underwent 23 operations to reconstruct his feet and legs. He began standing after five months of the crash, and spent a year requiring the use of a wheelchair. He did, however, desire to return to racing, and in 2005, started taking steps to return to the cockpit.

In 2010, after retiring from the 2010 Indianapolis 500 on the first lap, Hamilton referenced his 2001 crash while commenting on his early exit from the 500 by saying, "It’s the second-worst day of my racing career...and everyone knows my worst one."

== Life after retirement ==
Hamilton became the color commentator for Indianapolis Motor Speedway Radio Network broadcasts in 2003. He later began driving the 2-seater IndyCar, which gives rides to VIPs and celebrities at IndyCar Series races.

Hamilton partnered with the new American Speed Association, partnering with ASA owner Dennis Huth, to take over control of the popular Southwest Tour for 2007, shortly after NASCAR terminated the popular AutoZone Elite division, which includes the popular Southwest series. The Speedco Southwest Tour series uses the same cars as the former NASCAR-sanctioned series.

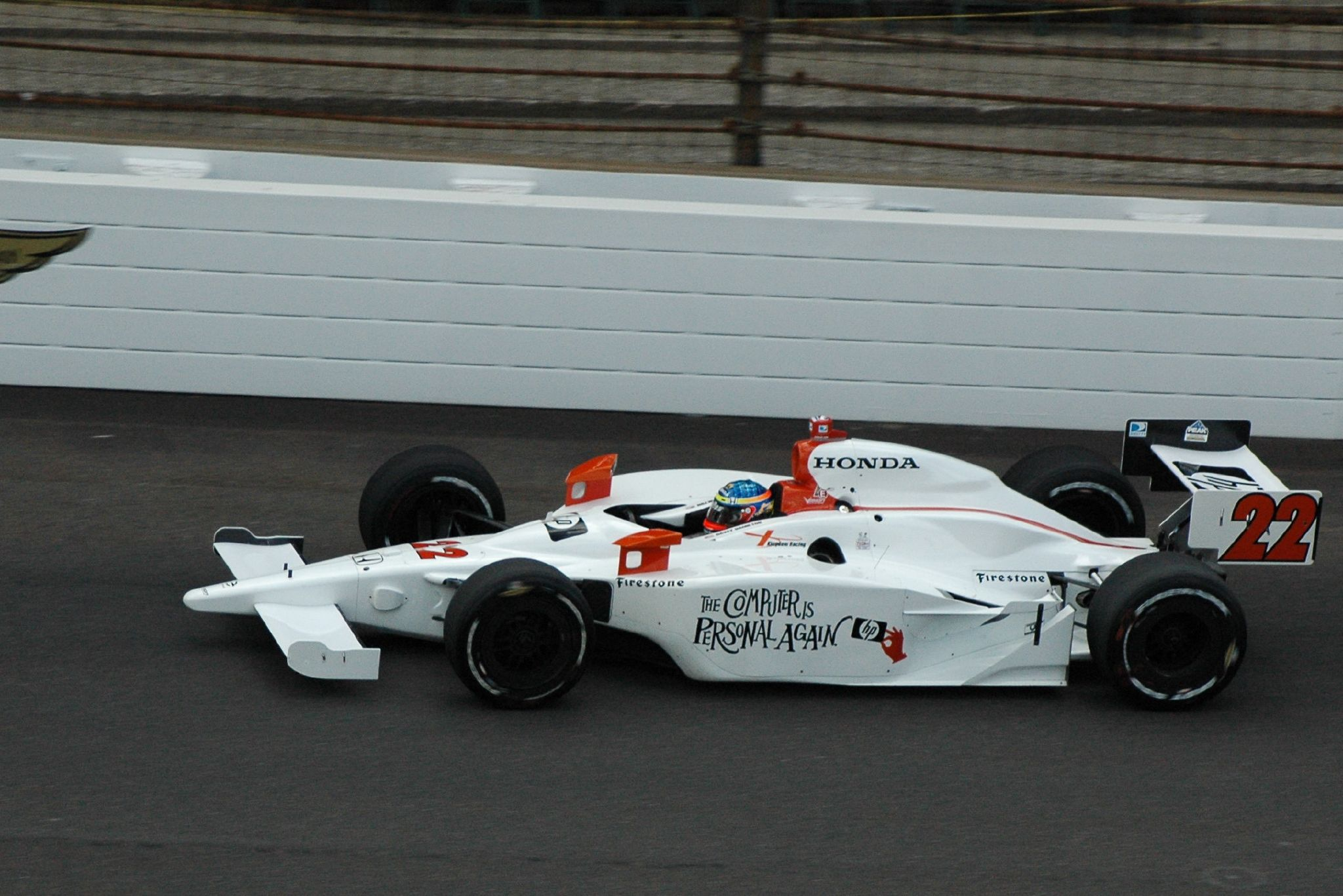
Hamilton practicing for the 2008 Indy 500

Hamilton also owns his own racing team, "Davey Hamilton Apex Racing." This team consists of two winged sprint drivers: his father Ken Hamilton and friend Mike Cullum. Also on the team is Davey's son DJ who races Outlaw Karts and Go Karts. Mike's daughter Jenna rounds out the team and she drives Outlaw Karts. In 2008, Hamilton became a partner in a group that purchased Terre Haute Action Track.

In 2014, Hamilton co-founded King of the Wing, a national pavement sprint car series.

== Return to racing ==
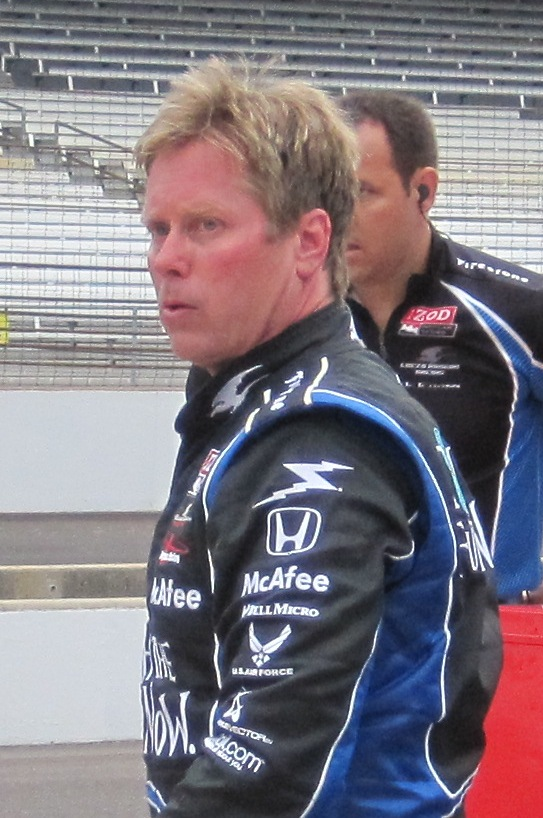
Hamilton at the Indianapolis Motor Speedway in May 2010.

In 2005, Hamilton started courting sponsors and perusing the paddock in an effort to return to racing. After settling several personal and business issues, he landed a ride for the 2007 Indianapolis 500, driving for Vision Racing. Qualifying 20th, Hamilton placed ninth after the race was ended early on lap 166 due to rain. For 2008, Hamilton re-signed with Vision Racing. He finished fourteenth in the 2008 Indianapolis 500. For the 2009 season, he drove for Dreyer & Reinbold Racing, and was the only one of the team's four drivers to qualify during the first weekend of qualifications. However he crashed out of the race on lap 79.

In 2010, Hamilton competed in the 2010 Indianapolis 500 for de Ferran Dragon Racing. He was involved in an incident with Tomas Scheckter on the first lap of the race, and was classified in 33rd, last place.

Hamilton's final season of races would be 2011. He finished 24th in the 2011 Indianapolis 500. He also raced in the Twin 275's at Texas for unfinished business. His final start would be at the tragic 2011 IZOD IndyCar World Championship at Las Vegas. Hamilton was fortunate enough to escape the major accident on lap eleven that killed Dan Wheldon, but the race was abandoned, and the results were scratched from official record. When the new chassis and engine package was introduced for the 2012 season, Hamilton was unable to secure a car for the 2012 Indianapolis 500 due to a lack of available rides.

In 2013, Hamilton joined the Stadium Super Trucks, serving as a substitute for Jimmy Vasser at Honda Indy Toronto; Hamilton started first in the event, but engine trouble forced him to finish seventh. In 2014, he made his season debut at the Firestone Grand Prix of St. Petersburg, where he placed eighth in the first race and ninth in the second race.

== Personal life ==
Davey has a son named Davey Jay Hamilton Jr. (D.J.) who was born on March 15, 1997, in Idaho. D.J. is also a racing driver, racing in sprint cars and Stadium Super Trucks. Davey also has a daughter named Hailey Hamilton, who was born on November 16th 1999, in Las Vegas, NV.

== Career results ==
=== American open–wheel results ===
(key) (Races in bold indicate pole position)

==== Indy Lights ====
Year	Team	1	2	3	4	5	6	7	8	9	10	11	12	Rank	Points
1995	Dick Simon Racing	MIA	PHX; DNQ	LBH	NAZ	MIL	DET	POR	TOR	CLE	NHA	VAN	LS	**NC**	**0**

==== CART IndyCar ====
Year	Team	No.	Chassis	Engine	1	2	3	4	5	6	7	8	9	10	11	12	13	14	15	16	17	Rank	Points	Ref
1991	Hemelgarn Racing	81	Lola T88/00	Buick 3300 V6t	SRF	LBH	PHX	INDY; DNQ	MIL	DET	POR	CLE	MEA	TOR	MIS	DEN	VAN	MDO	ROA	NAZ	LS	**NC**	**0**	
1993	Senter Sculley		Lola T90/00	Buick 3300 V6t	SRF	PHX	LBH	INDY; DNQ	MIL	DET	POR	CLE	TOR	MIS	NHA	ROA	VAN	MDO	NAZ	LS		**NC**	**0**	
1995	Hemelgarn Racing	95	Reynard 94i	Ford XB V8t	MIA	SRF	PHX	LBH	NAZ	INDY; DNQ	MIL	DET	POR	ROA	TOR	CLE	MIS	MDO	NHA	VAN	LS	**NC**	**0**	

==== IndyCar Series / Indy Racing League ====
Year	Team	No.	Chassis	Engine	1	2	3	4	5	6	7	8	9	10	11	12	13	14	15	16	17	18	19	Rank	Points	Ref
1996	A. J. Foyt Enterprises	14	Lola T95/00	Ford XB V8t	WDW; 12	PHX; 17	INDY; 12																	9th	192	
1996–97	A. J. Foyt Enterprises	14	Lola T95/00	Ford XB V8t	NHM; 5	LVS; 11																		2nd	272	
1996–97	A. J. Foyt Enterprises	14	Dallara IR7	Oldsmobile Aurora V8			WDW; 7																	2nd	272	
1996–97	A. J. Foyt Enterprises	14	G-Force GF01	Oldsmobile Aurora V8				PHX; 3	INDY; 6	TXS; 3	PPIR; 3	CHR; 16	NH2; 17	LV2; 7										2nd	272	
1998	Nienhouse Motorsports	6	G-Force GF01B	Oldsmobile Aurora V8	WDW; 3	PHX; 26	INDY; 4	TXS; 7	NHM; 4	DOV; 4		PPIR; 5												2nd	292	
1998	Nienhouse Motorsports	6	Dallara IR8	Oldsmobile Aurora V8							CLT; 7		ATL; 2	TX2; 9	LVS; 19									2nd	292	
1999	Galles Racing	9	G-Force GF01C	Oldsmobile Aurora V8	WDW; 8																			4th	237	
1999	Galles Racing	9	Dallara IR8	Oldsmobile Aurora V8				INDY; 11	TXS; 7	PPIR; 3	ATL; 7	DOV; 23	PPI2; 2	LVS; 13	TX2; 2									4th	237	
1999	Barnhart Motorsports	25	Dallara IR8	Oldsmobile Aurora V8		PHX; 27	CLT; C																	4th	237	
2000	Sinden Racing	44	Dallara	Oldsmobile	WDW; 26																			23rd	98	
2000	Team Xtreme	16	G-Force GF05	Oldsmobile		PHX; 18	LVS; 20	INDY; 20	TXS; 24	PPIR; 14	ATL; 15	KTY; 16												23rd	98	
2000	Mid America Motorsports	43	Dallara	Oldsmobile									TX2; 19											23rd	98	
2001	Sam Schmidt Motorsports	99	Dallara IR-01	Oldsmobile Aurora V8	PHX; 12	HMS; 19	ATL; 17	INDY; 23	TXS; 24	PPIR	RIR	KAN	NSH	KTY	STL	CHI	TX2							26th	54	
2007	Vision Racing	02	Dallara IR-05	Honda HI7R V8	HMS	STP	MOT	KAN	INDY; 9	MIL	TXS	IOW	RIR	WGL	NSH	MDO	MIS	KTY	SNM	DET	CHI			26th	22	
2008	Vision Racing	22	Dallara IR-05	Honda HI7R V8	HMS	STP	MOT^{1}	LBH^{1}	KAN	INDY; 14	MIL	TXS	IOW	RIR	WGL	NSH	MDO	EDM	KTY	SNM	DET	CHI	SRF^{2}	36th	16	
2009	Dreyer & Reinbold Racing	44	Dallara IR-05	Honda HI7R V8	STP	LBH	KAN	INDY; 29	MIL	TXS	IOW	RIR	WGL	TOR	EDM	KTY	MDO	SNM	CHI	MOT	HMS			40th	10	
2010	de Ferran Dragon Racing	21	Dallara IR-05	Honda HI7R V8	SAO	STP	ALA	LBH	KAN	INDY; 33	TXS	IOW	WGL	TOR	EDM	MDO	SNM	CHI; 18	KTY	MOT	HMS			36th	26	
2011	Dreyer & Reinbold Racing	11	Dallara IR-05	Honda HI7R V8	STP	ALA	LBH	SAO	INDY; 24	TXS1; 27	TXS2; 25	MIL	IOW	TOR	EDM	MDO	NHM	SNM	BAL	MOT	KTY	LVS^{3} C		41st	26	

^{1} Races run on same day.
^{2} Non-points-paying, exhibition race.
^{3} The Las Vegas Indy 300 was abandoned after Dan Wheldon died from injuries sustained in a 15-car crash on lap 11.

Years	Teams	Races	Poles	Wins	Podiums (Non-win)	Top 10s (Non-podium)	Indianapolis 500 Wins	Championships
11	8	56	0	0	8	15	0	0

==== Indianapolis 500 ====
Year	Chassis	Engine	Start	Finish	Team
1991	Lola T88/00	Buick 3300 V6t	DNQ		Hemelgarn Racing
1993	Lola T90/00	Buick 3300 V6t	DNQ		Senter Sculley
1995	Reynard 94i	Ford XB V8t	DNQ		Hemelgarn Racing
1996	Lola T95/00	Ford XB V8t	10	12	A. J. Foyt Enterprises
1997	G-Force GF01	Oldsmobile Aurora V8	8	6	A. J. Foyt Enterprises
1998	G-Force GF01B	Oldsmobile Aurora V8	8	4	Nienhouse Motorsports
1999	Dallara IR9	Oldsmobile Aurora V8	11	11	Barnhart Motorsports
2000	G-Force GF05	Oldsmobile Aurora V8	28	20	TeamXtreme
2001	Dallara IR-01	Oldsmobile Aurora V8	26	23	Sam Schmidt Motorsports
2007	Dallara IR-05	Honda HI7R V8	20	9	Vision Racing
2008	Dallara IR-05	Honda HI7R V8	18	14	Vision Racing
2009	Dallara IR-05	Honda HI7R V8	22	29	Dreyer & Reinbold Racing
2010	Dallara IR-05	Honda HI7R V8	14	33	de Ferran Dragon Racing
2011	Dallara IR-05	Honda HI7R V8	15	24	Dreyer & Reinbold Racing

=== Stadium Super Trucks ===
(key) (Bold – Pole position. Italics – Fastest qualifier. * – Most laps led.)

Stadium Super Trucks results
Year	1	2	3	4	5	6	7	8	9	10	11	12	13	14	15	16	17	18	19	20	21	22	SSTC	Pts	Ref
2013	PHO	LBH	LAN	SDG	SDG	STL	TOR; 7	TOR; 3	CRA	CRA	OCF	OCF	OCF	CPL									20th	38	
2014	STP; 8	**STP**; 9	LBH	IMS	IMS	DET	DET	DET	AUS	TOR	TOR	OCF	OCF	CSS	LVV	LVV							22nd	25	
2016	ADE	ADE	ADE	STP	STP	LBH; 8	LBH; 11	DET	DET	DET	TOW	TOW	TOW	TOR	TOR	CLT	CLT	OCF	OCF	SRF	SRF	SRF	35th	23	

Awards
Preceded by Eddie Cheever	Scott Brayton Award; 2001	Succeeded by Arie Luyendyk
