= Arie Luyendyk Jr. =

Dutch and American racing driver

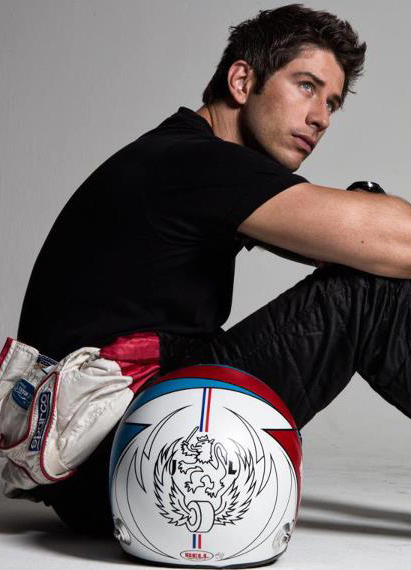
- Luyendyk in 2012
- Born: September 18, 1981 (age 45) s'-Hertogenbosch, Netherlands
- Relatives: Arie Luyendyk (father)

Stadium Super Trucks career
- Debut season: 2013
- Car number: 25
- Starts: 61
- Wins: 3
- Podiums: 14
- Poles: 0
- Best finish: 6th in 2016
- Finished last season: 10th (2021)

Previous series
- 2002–2008, 2010 2007–2008 2006 2001: Indy Lights; A1 Grand Prix (rookie driver); IndyCar Series; SCCA Formula Continental
Medal record
Representing United States
Summer X Games
Bronze medal – third place	2015 Austin	Stadium Super Trucks
- Statistics up to date as of May 14, 2025.

Arie Luyendyk Jr. (/ˈɑːri ˈlaɪəndaɪk/ AR-ee LY-ən-dyke, Dutch: [ˈaːri ˈlœyə(n)ˌdɛik]; born September 18, 1981) is a Dutch and American auto racing driver, television personality, and son of two-time Indianapolis 500 winner Arie Luyendyk. He has competed mostly in North America where his father lives and made his career. Luyendyk is best known for competing in the Indy Lights Series where he finished second, third and fourth in the Championship over a number of years. He was named a test-driver in A1 Grand Prix alongside Jeroen Bleekemolen for A1 Team The Netherlands starting the 2007–08 season.

Luyendyk has competed in various sports-car series, including the 12 Hours of Sebring and the 24 Hours of Daytona.

Luyendyk was a contestant on ABC's dating competition The Bachelorette season 8 in 2012, where he placed first runner-up, and starred in the 22nd season of its sister show The Bachelor, which premiered on January 1, 2018. In 2023, he was a contestant on The Traitors, where he finished in fourth place.

== Early life ==
Luyendyk was born in the Netherlands, to Arie and Mieke Luyendyk. At the age of three, he immigrated with his family, including sister Maida, to the United States and settled in Brookfield, Wisconsin. Luyendyk has two younger twin brothers, Alec and Luca. He graduated from Desert Mountain High School in 2000.

== Career ==
Luyendyk began racing karts in 1992, and moved to Sports Car Club of America club Formula Ford competition six years later at the age of sixteen. He raced in a number of American junior formulae, notching wins in the Skip Barber Formula Dodge series and top five finishes the U.S. Formula Ford 2000 Championship. In 2001, Luyendyk finished third in the Formula Continental class at the SCCA National Championship Runoffs as well as winning the SCCA Southern Pacific divisional title on the strength of four wins in that same class.

Luyendyk competed full-time in the first three seasons of the Indy Racing League's Indy Pro Series (now known as Firestone Indy Lights), beginning in 2002. In his Firestone Indy Lights career, Luyendyk has one victory, four pole positions and 24 top-five finishes. Luyendyk finished second in the Firestone Indy Lights Championship in 2002, third in 2004, and fourth in 2008.

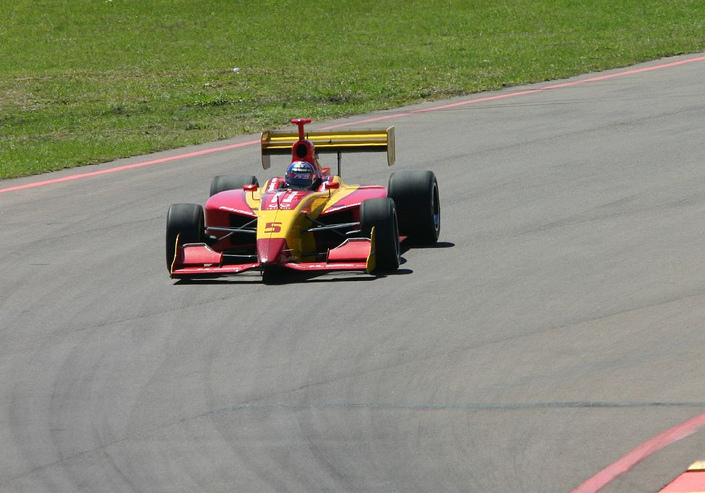
Luyendyk driving an Indy Lights car on the Streets of St. Petersburg in 2005

In 2005, Luyendyk attempted to make his IndyCar Series debut by qualifying for the 2005 Indianapolis 500 in a car owned by Curb-Agajanian/Beck Motorsports. Luyendyk's qualifying speed of 215.039 mph (346.072 km/h) was close to 2 mph (3.2 km/h) slower than the next slowest qualifier at the time. A. J. Foyt hired driver Felipe Giaffone to qualify a third car for him, and Giaffone's 217.645 mph (350.266 km/h) four-lap average bumped Luyendyk from the field.

Luyendyk did qualify for the 2006 Indianapolis 500 in a car owned by his father and backed by cheapcaribbean.com and Blue Star Jets. The team had limited practice time due to a second week engine program. However, his first race in the more powerful cars ended early due to handling issues, with Luyendyk finishing 54 laps out of 200 and ending in 28th place in the field of 33.

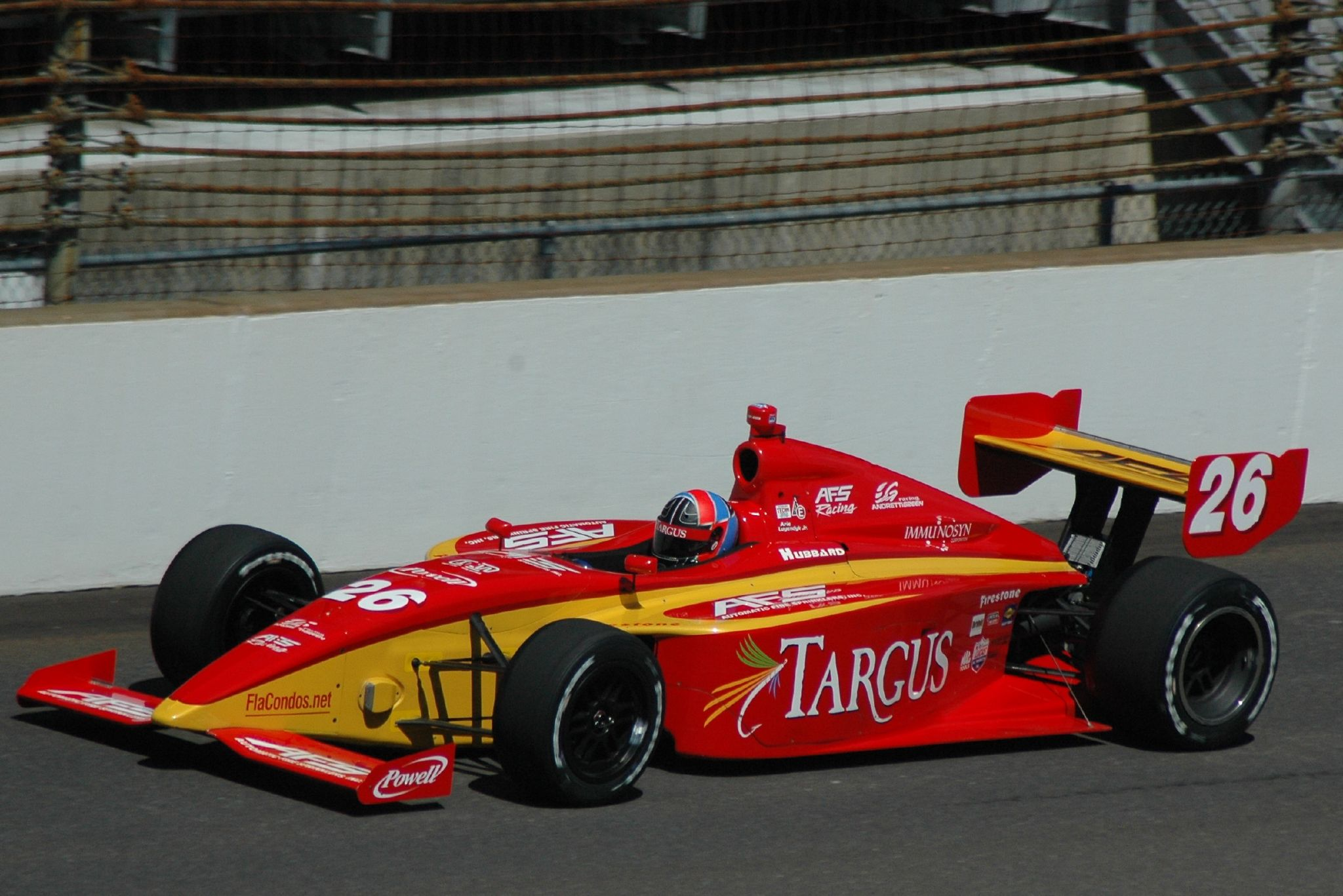
Luyendyk practicing for the 2008 Firestone Freedom 100

In the 2007–08 A1 Grand Prix season, Luyendyk drove for A1 Team Netherlands in the A1 Grand Prix World Cup of Motorsport as the team's "rookie driver". His best result was a fifth place training time at Round 5 held in Taupo, New Zealand. He has returned to the Firestone Indy Lights Series to race for AGR-AFS Racing as the teammate to Raphael Matos. He captured his first series win in the final race of the 2008 season at Chicagoland Speedway by passing Matos on a late race restart. Luyendyk would finish the 2008 season fourth in the Championship, recording five podium finishes.

In 2010, Luyendyk returned part-time to Indy Lights and drove in the Freedom 100 for Andersen Racing and three other oval races for Alliance Motorsports. His best finish was seventh at Chicagoland.

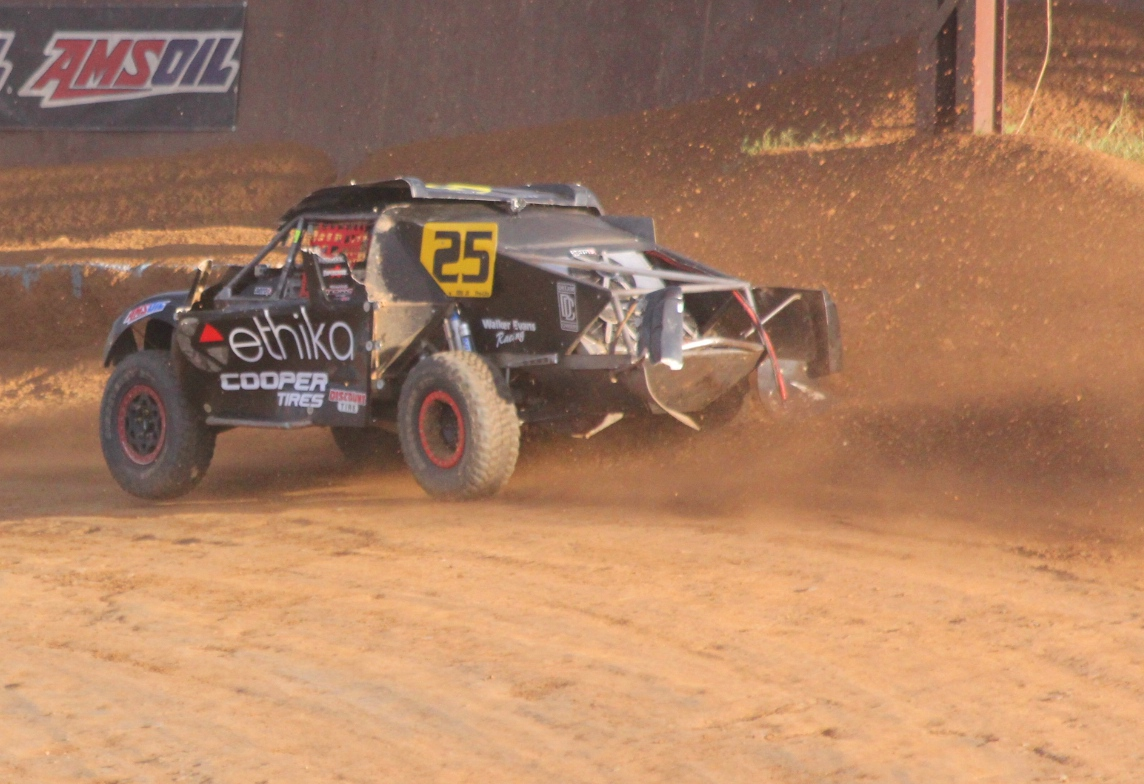
Pro Light TORC truck at Crandon

In 2013, Luyendyk made the switch to off-road racing in the Stadium Super Trucks series, finishing seventh in points. In his partial season, Luyendyk notched a heat win and three fourth place finishes in seven starts. Two years later, he won the bronze medal at X Games Austin 2015 in the SST category.

Luyendyk finished the season driving in the Traxxas TORC Series with Aero Motorsports backed by Ethika and Cooper Tires. In Luyendyk's TORC debut he finished fourth at Crandon International Off-Road Raceway driving in the Pro Light class. On November 18, 2013, Luyendyk completed a test with Dale Coyne Racing in the DW12 IndyCar. Luyendyk ran 138 laps.

During the 2018 Stadium Super Trucks, Luyendyk recorded his first series win at Barbagallo Raceway in Perth, Australia. He scored a second victory at Detroit in June. His third SST win came two years later at Road America when he won the weekend's first race after an early roll.

== Television ==
In 2009, Luyendyk became the driver analyst for Versus broadcasts of Indy Lights races. In 2012 Luyendyk returned to the booth, commentating the Indy Lights races for the NBC Sports Network. He appeared as himself in season nine of Hell's Kitchen. The chefs visited the Grand Prix of Long Beach in which Luyendyk was participating.

In 2023, Luyendyk appeared as a contestant on the reality game show The Traitors, which aired on Peacock.

=== The Bachelorette and The Bachelor ===
Luyendyk placed second on the eighth season of the reality show The Bachelorette, starring Emily Maynard.

Luyendyk appeared in the first episode of the 17th season of The Bachelor. Luyendyk also competed on Wipeout: Summer Episode 7: "Bachelors vs. Bachelorettes", where he was eliminated early.

In 2017, it was announced that Luyendyk would appear in the 22nd season of The Bachelor. He asked Rebecca "Becca" Kufrin to marry him at the season finale however he later regretted rejecting Lauren Burnham, the runner-up, and tried to rekindle things with Burnham. Luyendyk and Kufrin broke up after the show, but the breakup was televised. Luyendyk revealed that he had been talking to Burnham, and later the two began dating.

== Personal life ==
Luyendyk works as a real estate broker for RE/MAX in Scottsdale, Arizona. After realizing he had made a mistake upon proposing to Becca Kufrin on The Bachelor, he proposed to the runner-up, Lauren Burnham, and Burnham moved to Scottsdale to be with Luyendyk. The couple married on January 12, 2019. They have a daughter who was born on May 29, 2019. On June 11, 2021, Lauren gave birth to twins. On September 18, 2025, Lauren gave birth to a daughter.

Luyendyk appeared as an agent on a 2019 episode of HGTV's House Hunters International set in Amsterdam.

== Racing record ==
=== SCCA National Championship Runoffs ===
Year	Track	Car	Engine	Class	Finish	Start	Status
2001	Mid-Ohio	Van Diemen RF01	Ford	Formula Continental	3	2	Running

=== American open-wheel racing ===
(key) (Races in bold indicate pole position)

==== Indy Lights ====
Year	Team	1	2	3	4	5	6	7	8	9	10	11	12	13	14	15	16	Rank	Points	Ref
2002	Luyendyk Racing	KAN; 10	NSH; 2	**MIS**; 2	KTY; 6	STL; 2	CHI; 2	TXS; 7										2nd	236	
2003	Sinden Racing	HMS; 4	PHX; 10	INDY; 15	PPIR; 3	KAN; 12	NSH; 9	**MIS**; 11	STL; 3	KTY; 4	CHI; 4	FON; 10	**TXS**; 13					7th	299	
2004	Sam Schmidt Motorsports	HMS; 9	PHX; 2	INDY; 3	KAN; 7	NSH; 11	MIL; 9	MIS; 8										3rd	330	
2004	AFS Racing								KTY; 4	PPIR; 5	CHI; 4	FON; 14	TXS; 4					3rd	330	
2005	AFS Racing	HMS	PHX; 4	STP; 5	INDY										FON; 6			11th	228	
2005	Brian Stewart Racing					TXS; 10	IMS; 6	NSH; 8	MIL; 7	KTY; 10	PPIR; 10	SNM	CHI	WGL				11th	228	
2006	AFS Racing	HMS; 4	STP1; DNS	STP2	INDY	WGL; 11	IMS	NSH; 11	MIL	KTY	SNM1	SNM2	CHI; 6					15th	105	
2007	Guthrie Racing	HMS	STP1	STP2	INDY	MIL	IMS1	IMS2	IOW	WGL1; 17	WGL2; 22	NSH	MOH	KTY	SNM1	SNM2	CHI	35th	21	
2008	AGR-AFS Racing	HMS; 4	STP1; 6	STP2; 22	KAN; 3	INDY; 14	MIL; 8	**IOW**; 2	WGL1; 7	WGL2; 7	NSH; 3	MOH1; 8	MOH2; 11	KTY; 3	SNM1; 17	SNM2; 16	CHI; 1	4th	428	
2010	Andersen Racing	STP	ALA	LBH	INDY; 14	IOW	WGL	TOR	EDM	MOH	SNM							17th	82	
2010	Alliance Motorsports											CHI; 7	KTY; 9	HMS; 12				17th	82	

==== IndyCar ====
Year	Team	1	2	3	4	5	6	7	8	9	10	11	12	13	14	15	16	17	Rank	Points	Ref
2005	CURB/Agajanian/Beck Motorsports	HMS	PHX	STP	MOT	INDY; DNQ	TXS	RIR	KAN	NSH	MIL	MIS	KTY	PPIR	SNM	CHI	WGL	FON	NC	–	
2006	Luyendyk Racing	HMS	STP	MOT	INDY; 28	WGL	TXS	RIR	KAN	NSH	MIL	MIS	KTY	SNM	CHI				36th	10	

==== Indianapolis 500 ====
Year	Chassis	Engine	Start	Finish	Team
2005	Dallara	Chevrolet	DNQ		Beck
2006	Panoz	Honda	31	28	Luyendyk

=== Complete A1 Grand Prix results ===
(key) (Races in bold indicate pole position) (Races in italics indicate fastest lap)

Year	Entrant	1	2	3	4	5	6	7	8	9	10	11	12	13	14	15	16	17	18	19	20	DC	Points
2007–08	Netherlands	NED; SPR; PO	NED; FEA; PO	CZE; SPR; PO	CZE; FEA; PO	MYS; SPR; PO	MYS; FEA; PO	CHN; SPR; PO	CHN; FEA; PO	NZL; SPR; PO	NZL; FEA; PO	AUS; SPR; PO	AUS; FEA; PO	RSA; SPR; PO	RSA; FEA; PO	MEX; SPR; PO	MEX; FEA; PO	CHN; SPR; PO	CHN; FEA; PO	GBR; SPR; PO	GBR; SPR; PO	7th	87

=== Stadium Super Trucks ===
(key) (Bold – Pole position. Italics – Fastest qualifier. * – Most laps led.)

Stadium Super Trucks results
Year	1	2	3	4	5	6	7	8	9	10	11	12	13	14	15	16	17	18	19	20	21	22	SSTC	Pts	Ref
2013	PHO; 4	LBH; 7	LAN; 11	SDG; 4	**SDG**; 4	**STL**; 12	TOR	TOR	CRA	CRA	OCF	OCF	OCF	CPL									7th	154	
2014	STP	STP	LBH	IMS; 5	IMS; 6	DET; 3	DET; 4	DET; 2	AUS; 10	TOR	TOR	OCF	OCF	CSS	LVV	LVV							11th	110	
2015	ADE	ADE	ADE	STP	STP	LBH	DET; 10	**DET**; 8	DET; 8	AUS; 3	TOR	TOR	OCF	OCF	OCF	SRF	SRF	SRF	SRF	SYD	LVV	LVV	13th	72	
2016	ADE	ADE	ADE	STP	STP	LBH	LBH	**DET**; 2*	DET; C^{1}	DET; 8	TOW; 4	TOW; 5	TOW; 3	TOR	TOR	CLT; 10	**CLT**; 2	OCF; 5	OCF; 9	SRF	SRF	SRF	6th	173	
2017	ADE	ADE	ADE	STP; 5	STP; 4	LBH; 6	LBH; 6	PER	PER	PER	DET; 10	DET; 6	TEX; 7	TEX; 8	HID	HID	HID	BEI; 7	GLN	GLN	**ELS**; 7	ELS; 9	8th	183	
2018	ELS; 9	ADE; 2	ADE; 5	ADE; 7	**LBH**; 3	LBH; 14	PER; 1	PER; 8	DET; 3	DET; 1	TEX; 6	TEX; 10	ROA; Rpl^{†}	ROA; Rpl^{†}	SMP	SMP	HLN; 3	HLN; 11	MXC	MXC			7th	305	
2019	COA	COA	TEX	TEX	LBH	LBH	TOR	TOR	MOH; 6	MOH; 8	MOH	MOH	ROA	ROA	ROA	POR	POR	SRF	SRF				19th	28	
2020	ADE	ADE	ADE	ROA; 1*	ROA; 9																		N/A^{2}	–	
2021	STP; 3	STP; 4	MOH	MOH	MOH	MOH	NSH; 7	NSH; 6	LBH	LBH													10th	75	
2025	LBH; 10	**LBH**; 4																					T-6th	29	
^{†} – Replaced by Casey Mears, points went to Luyendyk

^{*} Season in progress.
^{1} The race was abandoned after Matt Mingay suffered serious injuries in a crash on lap three.
^{2} Standings were not recorded by the series for the 2020 season.

Preceded by Nick Viall	The Bachelor; Season 22	Succeeded by Colton Underwood
