= 2016 Stadium Super Trucks =

Seasons
- ← 2015 2017 →

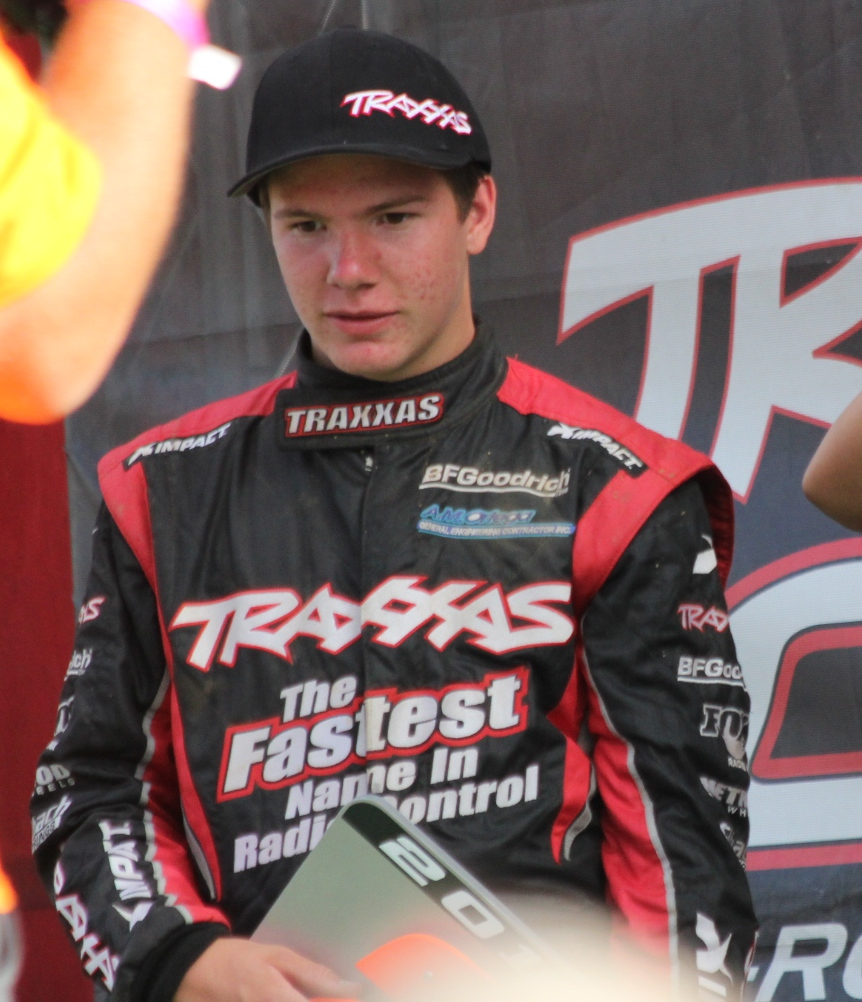
Sheldon Creed, the 2016 champion.

The 2016 Stadium Super Trucks were the fourth season of the Stadium Super Trucks series. After two seasons as Speed Energy Formula Off-Road, the name was quietly phased out in series branding by 2016 as it became the Speed Energy Stadium Super Trucks presented by Traxxas.

2015 champion Sheldon Creed defended his title when he recorded twelve wins. Matthew Brabham finished second in the championship with 570 points, a 75-point differential between him and Creed, while Robby Gordon took third.

== Drivers ==
No.	Driver	Races
1	(United States) Sheldon Creed	1–8, 10–21
1	(United States) Robby Gordon	9
2	(Australia) Matt Mingay	1–3, 8
2	(United States) Robby Gordon	10–12, 19–21
5	(Venezuela) E. J. Viso	10–12
6	(United States) Tyler McQuarrie	4–7, 9, 17–18
6	(United States) Scotty Steele	8
7	(United States) Robby Gordon	1–7, 13–18
7	(Australia) Matthew Brabham	8–9
9	(Italy) Max Papis	13–14
11	(Australia) Rob Whyte	10–12
12	(United Kingdom) Shaun Richardson	10–12, 19–21
14	(United States) Pat O'Keefe	4–7
15	(United States) Brian Ickler	15–16
20	(United States) Dustin Scott	4–9, 13–14
20	(United States) Arie Luyendyk Jr.	15–16
21	(Australia) Matt Nolan	19–21
25	(Australia) Travis Milburn	1, 3
25	(Australia) Rob Cowie	2
25	(United States) Arie Luyendyk Jr.	8–9
30	(United States) Robbie Pierce	1–3, 15–16
30	(United States) Augie Lerch	4–5
30	(United States) Davey Hamilton	6–7
30	(United States) Burt Jenner	8
30	(United States) Scotty Steele	9
30	(United States) Arie Luyendyk Jr.	10–12, 17–18
30	(Canada) Paul Tracy	13–14
30	(United States) P. J. Jones	19–21
33	(United States) Todd Romano	10–12
36	(United States) Kenny Wallace	15
36	(United States) Jessie Johnson	16
45	(Australia) Craig Dontas	19–21
50	(United States) Burt Jenner	1–3
57	(United States) Bill Hynes	1–9, 13–18
67	(Australia) Paul Morris	1–12, 15–21
75	(United States) Erik Davis	6–7, 10–12
76	(United States) Bill Hynes	10–12, 19–21
78	(United States) Sara Price	13–21
83	(Australia) Matthew Brabham	1–7, 10–21
83	(Venezuela) E. J. Viso	8–9
87	(Australia) Toby Price	1–3, 13–14, 19–21
87	(United States) Aaron Bambach	8–9
93	(Canada) Russell Boyle	13–14
99	(United States) Kyle LeDuc	17–18
441	(United States) Troy Diede	17–18
500	(Australia) Greg Gartner	1–3
888	(United Arab Emirates) Khaled Al Mudhaf	6–7
Sources: (Note: Sorted by round: Adelaide (Races 1–3); St. Petersburg (Races 4–5); Long Beach (Races 6–7); Detroit (Races 8–9); Townsville (Races 10–12); Toronto (Races 13–14); Charlotte (Races 15–16); Costa Mesa (Races 17–18); Surfers Paradise (Races 19–21))

== Schedule ==
Round	Track	Location	Date	Supporting
1	Adelaide Street Circuit	Adelaide, South Australia, Australia	March 4–6	Clipsal 500 Adelaide
2	St. Petersburg Street Course	St. Petersburg, Florida	March 12–13	Firestone Grand Prix of St. Petersburg
3	Long Beach Street Circuit	Long Beach, California	April 16–17	Toyota Grand Prix of Long Beach
4	Raceway at Belle Isle Park	Detroit, Michigan	June 3–5	Chevrolet Detroit Belle Isle Grand Prix
5	Townsville Street Circuit	Townsville, Queensland, Australia	July 8–10	Castrol Edge Townsville 400
6	Exhibition Place	Toronto, Ontario, Canada	July 16–17	Honda Indy Toronto
7	Charlotte Motor Speedway Dirt Track	Concord, North Carolina	August 19–20	TORC: The Off Road Championship
8	OC Fair & Event Center	Costa Mesa, California	September 16–17	Sand Sports Super Show
9	Surfers Paradise Street Circuit	Surfers Paradise, Queensland, Australia	October 21–23	Castrol Gold Coast 600

== Season summary ==
SST racing at Honda Indy Toronto

The 2016 season began at Adelaide Street Circuit. Indianapolis 500 driver Matthew Brabham, who ran the SST round at Toronto in 2015, returned to the series for Adelaide, while local driver Travis Milburn made his SST debut in the race weekend; other Australians in the field included Paul Morris, Rob Cowie, Matt Mingay, Greg Gartner, and 2016 Dakar Rally winner Toby Price. Defending champion Sheldon Creed started eleventh in the twelve-driver grid but drove his way through the field. In front, Price led the race until lap six, when he collided into the wall. Morris inherited the lead and dueled with Creed for the position. As the two entered the final ramps, Morris went sideways and missed the second jump, enabling Creed to take the win. On the first lap of the second race, Mingay rolled his truck as he entered turn fourteen. Mingay nearly landed on Burt Jenner, but he was able to avoid Mingay's truck. Jenner battled with Price for much of the race before passing him on lap six, holding off Gordon to win. Mingay's struggles continued in the third race when he was spun by Price on lap three as he entered the ramp. Creed won the round.

The series returned to the United States with the Firestone Grand Prix of St. Petersburg, the third consecutive season that the trucks raced at the street course. Traxxas drivers swept the weekend's two races with Creed winning the first and Keegan Kincaid the second; Tyler McQuarrie joined the two on the podium in both races. Dustin Scott ran his first SST race at St. Petersburg, finishing sixth in his debut round.

Creed swept the Toyota Grand Prix of Long Beach's two races. On the final lap of the second race, Pat O'Keefe landed off a jump erratically, causing his truck to slide over the second ramp before hitting the catchfence dividing the track from pit road. The wreck ended the race as Creed was declared the winner. Dubai 24 Hour driver Khaled Al Mudhaf made his SST debut over the weekend, finishing tenth and eighth.

At the Chevrolet Detroit Belle Isle Grand Prix, series veteran Arie Luyendyk Jr. made his season debut. Brabham recorded a weekend sweep as he won the two official races. The slate originally featured three races, but the second round saw Mingay's truck flip on lap three, prompting a red flag and suspending the race. Mingay was taken to Detroit Receiving Hospital for facial injuries, and was eventually placed under a coma for five days as he underwent jaw and brain surgeries. Mingay returned to Australia after he recovered, but lost three weeks' worth of memories. Officially, Race 2 is not included in the series' records.

In support of the injured Mingay, Gordon drove his No. 2 Hot Wheels truck when the series raced in the Castrol Edge Townsville 400 for the first time. Creed, Gordon, and Viso won the three races, with Viso taking his first win of 2016; Creed, who finished second and fourth in the other two rounds, scored the weekend victory. Despite his Race 2 win, Gordon finished at the back in Races 1 and 3 due to mechanical issues.

At Honda Indy Toronto, 17-time motocross champion Sara Price made her series debut, becoming the first female driver in SST history. Also debuting in the series at Toronto was Champ Car and NASCAR driver Max Papis, while 2003 CART champion Paul Tracy, who last ran an SST race in 2014, returned to the series. Traxxas teammates Brabham and Creed battled one another for the weekend's two wins, with the former winning Race 1 and the latter Race 2.

In August, SST partnered with TORC: The Off Road Championship to race the Dirt Track at Charlotte Motor Speedway; it was the series' first dirt track racing event since Valvoline Raceway in 2015. To accommodate the stadium trucks, track officials added a 36-inch tall aluminum ramp to the start/finish line. NASCAR drivers Kenny Wallace and Brian Ickler made their series debuts, though Wallace was replaced by TORC driver Jessie Johnson for Race 2 as Wallace had television obligations with the NASCAR Cup Series; Johnson, who finished third, ran his first SST race since 2013. Creed won both rounds.

Entering the series' Sand Sports Super Show weekend, tragedy took place when Gordon's parents were found dead in their nearby Orange, California home; in a statement released the next day, Gordon announced the race weekend would go on as planned, but added that "to switch from what happened to a business mode really stinks." Heat races were held before the two finals, with SST newcomer Troy Diede starting on the pole as a result. In the first race, Brabham took the lead at the start, while Gordon moved his way up from the back of the field. Late in the race, Gordon took the Joker Lap to get past Brabham and claim the win. P. J. Jones, who was substituting for O'Keefe in the Safecraft Safety Equipment truck, was able to pass Brabham to take second. With six laps left in the race, Morris flipped his truck but was able to finish sixth. Creed, who finished eighth in Race 1 after breaking an axle, dominated the second with Brabham tailing.

On October 13–16, the series went to Baja California to run the inaugural Mike's Peak Hill Climb Challenge, held at Mike's Sky Rancho. The hillclimbing event featured 144 competitors across various vehicle classes including SST. Held on a 19.5-mile (31.4 km) course with 203 turns, water crossings and cattle grids, it marked the first time a stadium truck raced on such a track. Gordon dedicated the hillclimb to his late father Bob Gordon; he remarked "if I would have stopped this event, he would have been mad at me." Including Gordon and Creed, the field of competitors featured a variety of drivers like an eleven-year old racer with his father serving as co-driver, and 2015 Baja 500 winner Apdaly Lopez, who won the SST gold medal at X Games Austin 2014 and entered the hillclimb in an unlimited truck. Red Bull off-road racer Bryce Menzies was also an entrant but did not compete due to injury; in his place, he challenged the SST drivers to beat his time of 14:20. On Friday, Gordon recorded the fastest time of the 16-driver field with a time of 17:08, followed by Creed with 17:29. Gordon once again led the grid on Saturday with a time of 16:51, a 22-second advantage over second-placed Creed.

The season came to a close with the Castrol Gold Coast 600 at Surfers Paradise Street Circuit. In practice for Friday's race, teammates Morris and Price collided as they entered a turn, causing the two to roll over as they went into the barrier. Race 1 saw multiple wrecks, including Craig Dontas taking out the chicane barriers that forced the competition caution to be expedited to facilitate repairs, with Brabham also landing on Jones' truck as they raced to the finish for second; Creed won by 12.182 seconds, one of the widest margins in SST history. Gordon, returning to the No. 2 truck, won Race 2 while Creed held off Brabham for Race 3. Gold Coast would not return to the schedule until 2019 when it also served as that year's finale.

Creed concluded 2016 with a series-high twelve wins, quadruple that of the second-most (three apiece by Gordon and Brabham). With 645 total points, he scored his second SST championship ahead of Brabham's 570.

== Results and standings ==
=== Race results ===
Round	Race	Event	Fastest qualifier	Pole position	Most laps led	Winning driver	Ref
1	1	Adelaide	(United States) Robby Gordon	(Australia) Robbie Pierce	(United States) Burt Jenner	(United States) Sheldon Creed	
1	2	Adelaide	(United States) Robby Gordon	(Australia) Toby Price	(Australia) Toby Price	(United States) Burt Jenner	
1	3	Adelaide	(United States) Robby Gordon	(Australia) Matt Mingay	(United States) Sheldon Creed	(United States) Sheldon Creed	
2	4	St. Petersburg		(United States) Pat O'Keefe	(United States) Sheldon Creed	(United States) Sheldon Creed	
2	5	St. Petersburg		(United States) Pat O'Keefe	(United States) Keegan Kincaid	(United States) Keegan Kincaid	
3	6	Long Beach	(United States) Robby Gordon	(Australia) Matthew Brabham	(United States) Sheldon Creed	(United States) Sheldon Creed	
3	7	Long Beach	(United States) Robby Gordon	(United States) Bill Hynes	(United States) Robby Gordon	(United States) Sheldon Creed	
4	8	Detroit	(United States) Sheldon Creed	(United States) Arie Luyendyk Jr.	(United States) Arie Luyendyk Jr.	(Australia) Matthew Brabham	
4	C	Detroit	(United States) Sheldon Creed	Suspended after Matt Mingay's accident on lap 3			
4	9	Detroit	(United States) Sheldon Creed	(United States) Scotty Steele	(Australia) Matthew Brabham	(Australia) Matthew Brabham	
5	10	Townsville	(United States) Sheldon Creed	(Venezuela) E. J. Viso	(Venezuela) E. J. Viso	(United States) Sheldon Creed	
5	11	Townsville	(United States) Sheldon Creed	(Australia) Rob Whyte	(United States) Robby Gordon	(United States) Robby Gordon	
5	12	Townsville	(United States) Sheldon Creed	(Australia) Rob Whyte	(Venezuela) E. J. Viso	(Venezuela) E. J. Viso	
6	13	Toronto	(Australia) Matthew Brabham	(United States) Bill Hynes	(Canada) Paul Tracy	(Australia) Matthew Brabham	
6	14	Toronto	(Australia) Matthew Brabham	(United States) Bill Hynes	(United States) Sheldon Creed	(United States) Sheldon Creed	
7	15	Charlotte	(United States) Sheldon Creed	(United States) Bill Hynes	(United States) Sheldon Creed	(United States) Sheldon Creed	
7	16	Charlotte	(United States) Sheldon Creed	(United States) Arie Luyendyk Jr.	(United States) Sheldon Creed	(United States) Sheldon Creed	
8	17	Costa Mesa	(United States) Sheldon Creed	(United States) Troy Diede	(Australia) Matthew Brabham	(United States) Robby Gordon	
8	18	Costa Mesa	(United States) Sheldon Creed	(United States) Troy Diede	(United States) Sheldon Creed	(United States) Sheldon Creed	
9	19	Surfers Paradise	(Australia) Matthew Brabham	(United States) Bill Hynes	(United States) Sheldon Creed	(United States) Sheldon Creed	
9	20	Surfers Paradise	(Australia) Matthew Brabham	(Australia) Paul Morris	(United States) Robby Gordon	(United States) Robby Gordon	
9	21	Surfers Paradise	(Australia) Matthew Brabham	(Australia) Craig Dontas	(United States) Sheldon Creed	(United States) Sheldon Creed	

=== Drivers' championship ===
Rank	Driver	(Australia) ADE			(Florida) STP		(California) LBH		(Michigan) DET			(Australia) TOW			(Canada) TOR		(North Carolina) CLT		(California) OCF		(Australia) SRF			Points
1	(United States) Sheldon Creed	1	4	1*	1*	2	1*	1	7	C		1	2	4	2	1*	1*	1*	8	1*	1*	6	1*	645
2	(Australia) Matthew Brabham	5	5	3	2	5	**2**	3	1	C	1*	3	4	2	1	2	2	4	3*	2	3	2	2	570
3	(United States) Robby Gordon	4	3	2	5	9	11	2*			6	11	1*	10	4	3	3	10	1	5	5	1*	4	444
4	(Australia) Paul Morris	2	7	9	6	4	4	10	4	C	3	2	3	12			4	5	6	11	12	**10**	5	386
5	(United States) Bill Hynes	10	10	10	9	7	9	**7**	11	C	7	7	12	8	**12**	**11**	**9**	**9**	9	7	**7**	5	11	255
6	(United States) Arie Luyendyk Jr.								**2***	C	8	4	5	3			10	**2**	5	9				173
7	(Australia) Toby Price	12	**2***	7											5	4					6	4	3	150
8	(United States) Keegan Kincaid	3	6	4	4	1*	12	12	10	C														147
9	(Australia) Greg Gartner	6	11	6								5	6	6							4	9	7	138
10	(United States) Tyler McQuarrie				3	3	3	5		C	5								11	10				132
11	(United States) Sara Price														8	9	5	6	4	6	9	11	6	130
12	(United States) P. J. Jones														7	8			2	4	2	8	12	129
13	(United States) Dustin Scott				8	6	5	6	6	C	9				6	6								120
14	(Venezuela) E. J. Viso								8	C	2	**10***	7	1*										99
15	(United Kingdom) Shaun Richardson											9	10	9							8	3	8	83
16	(United States) Erik Davis						6	4				8	9	5										78
17	(United States) Burt Jenner	8*	1	5					12															73
18	(United States) Robbie Pierce	**9**	9	11													7	7						62
19	(United States) Pat O'Keefe				**10**	**8**	7	9																50
20	(Australia) Matt Mingay	11	12	**8**					9	C^{†}														44
21	(United States) Aaron Bambach								3	C	4													41
22	(United States) Todd Romano											6	11	7										39
23	(Australia) Matt Nolan																				10	7	9	37
24	(United States) Kyle LeDuc																		7	3				35
25	(United States) Craig Dontas																				11	12	**10**	30
26	(United States) Brian Ickler																6	8						28
27	(Australia) Rob Whyte											12	**8**	**11**										28
28	(United States) Scotty Steele								5	C	**10**													27
29	(United States) Augie Lerch				7	10																		25
30	(Italy) Max Papis														11	7								24
31	(United States) Troy Diede																		**10**	**8**				24
32	(United Arab Emirates) Khaled Al Mudhaf						10	8																24
33	(Canada) Paul Tracy														9*	12								24
34	(Australia) Travis Milburn	7		12																				23
35	(United States) Davey Hamilton						8	11																23
36	(Canada) Russell Boyle														10	10								22
37	(United States) Jessie Johnson																	3						20
38	(United States) Kenny Wallace																8							15
39	(Australia) Rob Cowie		8																					13
^{†} Race suspended after Matt Mingay's crash and injury on lap 3. The event was not resumed and ultimately struck from series records.

Legend
Color	Result
Gold	Winner
Silver	2nd place
Bronze	3rd place
Green	4th–5th place (Top 5)
Light Blue	6th–10th place (Top 10)
Dark Blue	Finished (Outside Top 10)
Purple	Did not finish (DNF)
Red	Did not qualify (DNQ)
Brown	Withdrew (Wth)
Black	Disqualified (DSQ)
White	Did not start (DNS)
White	Race cancelled or abandoned (C)
Blank	Did not participate (DNP)
Blank	Driver replacement (Rpl)
Blank	Race not held (NH)
Blank	Not competing

**In-line notation**
**Bold**	Pole position (1 point; except Indy)
Italics	Ran fastest race lap
^{L}	Led race lap (1 point)
*	Led most race laps (2 points)
^{1–12}	Indy 500 "Fast Twelve" bonus points
^{c}	Qualifying canceled (no bonus point)
RY	Rookie of the Year
R	Rookie

Points	Position														
Points	1st	2nd	3rd	4th	5th	6th	7th	8th	9th	10th	11th	12th	13th	14th	15th
Heat	12	10	8	7	5	4	3	2	1						
Final	25	22	20	18	16	15	14	13	12	11	10	9	8	7	6

Bonuses
Most laps led	3
Position gained	1
Fastest qualifier	1
