= Carolyn Hamilton =

Dame Carolyn Paula Hamilton DBE (born November 1951) is a barrister who specialises in children's rights. She is also director of Coram Children's Legal Centre, an independent national charity dedicated to the promotion and implementation of children's rights based at the University of Essex. Hamilton has the position of professor at Essex.

== Early life and family ==
Carolyn Paula Hamilton was born in Hendon, London, in November 1951 to David Hamilton (died 2007) and his wife Laura. She has a brother Alan S. Hamilton. Her father escaped Nazi Germany as a boy before the Second World War on the first Kindertransport ship to England and subsequently made a fortune in real estate and fashion. In 2016, a dispute between Carolyn and her brother Alan over the division of their father's estate became the subject of a bitter court case.

== Career ==
Hamilton is a barrister who specialises in children's rights. In 1995 she was appointed director of Coram Children's Legal Centre, an independent national charity dedicated to the promotion and implementation of children's rights based at the University of Essex where Hamilton is a member of the department of law. She was a Consultant on Juvenile Justice to the Office of the High Commissioner for Human Rights from 2001-2003. She was the Child and Family Commissioner for the Legal Services Commission until December 2010.

She was appointed Dame Commander of the Order of the British Empire (DBE) in the 2017 Birthday Honours for services to children's rights.

== Selected publications ==
- Family, law and religion. Sweet & Maxwell, London, 1995. ISBN 978-0421458604
- Family law in Europe. Butterworths, London, 1995. (Kate Standley & David Hodson) ISBN 978-0406013088
- "Armed conflict: The protection of children under international law", International Journal of Children's Rights, Vol. 5 (1997). (With Tabatha Abu El-Haj)
- Bullying: A guide to the law: How to tackle bullying inside and outside school. (With Lucy Hopegood and Helen Rimington) Children's Legal Centre, 2000. ISBN 978-0946109968
- "The employment of children", Child and Family Law Quarterly, Vol. 16, No. 2, pp. 135–149, 2004. (With Bob Watt)
- International child abduction: Law and practice. Butterworths, London, 2001. (With Mark Everall, Nigel Lowe & Michael Nicholls) ISBN 9780406005410
