= Pacific Amphitheatre =

Amphitheatre in Costa Mesa, California, US

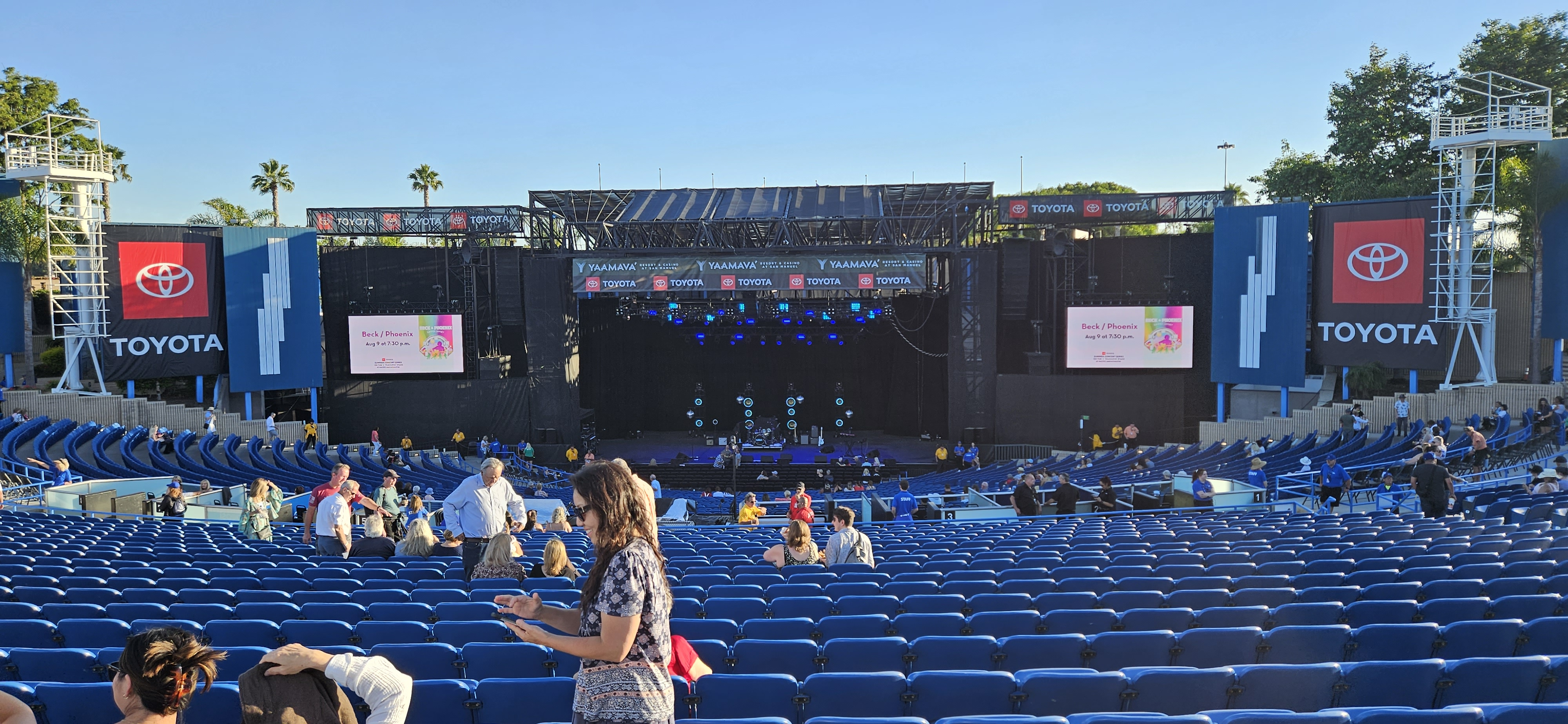
- Pacific Amphitheatre
- Interactive map of Pacific Amphitheatre
- Address: 100 Fair Dr; Costa Mesa, California 92626-6523
- Location: OC Fair & Event Center
- Owner: OC Fair & Event Center
- Operator: OC Fair & Event Center
- Capacity: 8,042 (2013–present); 18,765 (1983–2013)
- Type: Amphitheatre

Construction
- Opened: July 29, 1983
- Cost: $11 million

Website
- Venue Website

The Pacific Amphitheatre is an amphitheatre in Costa Mesa, Orange County, California. The amphitheatre is located on the grounds of the OC Fair & Event Center. It opened in July 1983 with Barry Manilow as the first performer. The venue currently operates from early July through early September, predominantly during the annual Summer Concert Series at the OC Fair. Since reopening in 2003, the venue has been independently managed and operated by the OC Fair & Event Center.

The Pacific Amphitheatre is regularly ranked in the top 10 of international venues in Pollstar's third quarter Worldwide Ticket Sales chart.

The fairgrounds are surrounded by dense residential developments and the amphitheatre was the focus of numerous noise complaints and litigation from local residents resulting in its closure in 1995. After almost a decade, it was reopened in 2003, in conjunction with the annual OC Fair. As part of an agreement with local residents, the venue operates with a reduce capacity and with strict sound monitoring.

In 2013, the venue underwent major construction reshaping the existing berm, reducing capacity from approximately 18,500 to 8,200 and creating a new lobby entrance from the inside of the fairgrounds.

Notable performances include the final concert by Marvin Gaye on August 14, 1983, Frank Sinatra on September 8, 1990, Whitney Houston on May 17, 1991, during her I'm Your Baby Tonight World Tour, Bob Dylan on July 28, 2003, Taylor Swift (opening for Leann Rimes) on July 31, 2007, Selena Gomez on July 24, 2011, Trevor Noah on July 16, 2022, and The Fab Four on August 3rd, 2024.

On June 30, 1984, a performance at the venue by Jefferson Starship was broadcast live nationwide by the ABC Rock Radio Network.

== See also ==
- List of contemporary amphitheatres
