= David Hamilton (psychologist) =

American psychologist (born 1941)

David Lewis Hamilton (born in 1941) is an American social psychologist and researcher currently working at the University of California, Santa Barbara.

== Education and academic career ==
David received his bachelor's degree from Gettysburg College and his master's degree from the University of Richmond. He received his Ph.D. in 1968 at the University of Illinois under supervision by Ivan Steiner and then was an assistant and associate professor at Yale University for 8 years before moving to the University of California, Santa Barbara in 1976. His focus shifted from trying to understand personality to trying to understand how people perceive personality.

== Research ==
His research focuses on the perception of people and groups and how processes related to these perceptions affect Stereotype formation and use. He has produced a lot of research that has contributed to our understanding of psychology, with two major ones listed below:

Illusory correlation: He found that processing biases could produce false judgements of correlations between two things that were not related. He found that illusory correlations form when small groups become associated with infrequent behaviour even when the behaviour frequency did not differ between other groups. This idea was very important in Social cognition.

Perceived Entitativity: His research has shown that perceived coherence in groups or people has important consequences for judgements of those entities.

== Awards ==
- 1987 - MERIT Award from the National Institute of Mental Health
- 2000 - Tom Ostrom award from Person Memory Interest Group for "outstanding contributions to social cognition"
- 2008 - Jean-Claude Codol Award from the European Association of Social Psychology for "contributions to the advancement of social psychology in Europe"
- 2014 - Distinguished Alumni Award from Gettysburg College

== Selected publications ==
Articles

- Chen, Jacqueline M.; Pauker, Kristin; Gaither, Sarah E.; Hamilton, David L.; Sherman, Jeffrey W. (2018-09-01). "Black + White = Not White: A minority bias in categorizations of Black-White multiracials". Journal of Experimental Social Psychology. 78: 43–54. doi:10.1016/j.jesp.2018.05.002. ISSN 0022-1031. S2CID 52263820.
- Chen, Jacqueline M.; Hamilton, David L. (2015-02-24). "Understanding Diversity". Personality and Social Psychology Bulletin. 41 (4): 586–598. doi:10.1177/0146167215573495. ISSN 0146-1672. PMID 25713169. S2CID 21309891.
- Hamilton, David L.; Chen, Jacqueline M.; Ko, Deborah M.; Winczewski, Lauren; Banerji, Ishani; Thurston, Joel A. (2015). "Sowing the seeds of stereotypes: Spontaneous inferences about groups". Journal of Personality and Social Psychology. 109 (4): 569–588. doi:10.1037/pspa0000034. ISSN 1939-1315. PMID 26414841. S2CID 41431273.
- Chen, Jacqueline M.; Hamilton, David L. (2012-01-01). "Natural ambiguities: Racial categorization of multiracial individuals". Journal of Experimental Social Psychology. 48 (1): 152–164. doi:10.1016/j.jesp.2011.10.005. ISSN 0022-1031.
- Spencer-Rodgers, Julie; Hamilton, David L.; Sherman, Steven J. (2007). "The central role of entitativity in stereotypes of social categories and task groups". Journal of Personality and Social Psychology. 92 (3): 369–388. doi:10.1037/0022-3514.92.3.369. ISSN 1939-1315. PMID 17352598.
- Hamilton, David L. (Nov 2007). "Understanding the complexities of group perception: broadening the domain". European Journal of Social Psychology. 37 (6): 1077–1101. doi:10.1002/ejsp.436. ISSN 0046-2772.

Books

- Hamilton, David L.; Sherman, Steven J.; Way, Nate; Percy, Elise J. (2015), "Convergence and divergence in perceptions of persons and groups.", APA handbook of personality and social psychology, Volume 2: Group processes., Washington: American Psychological Association, pp. 229–261, doi:10.1037/14342-009, ISBN 978-1-4338-1702-1
- Hamilton, D. L., Sherman, S. J., Way, N., & Percy, E. J. (2015). Convergence and divergence in perceptions of persons and groups. In American Psychological Association eBooks (pp. 229–261). APA handbook of personality and social psychology, Volume 2: Group processes.
- Hamilton, David E.; Carlston, Donal (2013). "The Emergence of Social Cognition". In Carlston, Donal (ed.). The Oxford Handbook of Social Cognition (online ed.). Oxford Library of Psychology. doi:10.1093/oxfordhb/9780199730018.013.0002.
