= David Hamilton (businessman) =

British businessman (1923–2007)

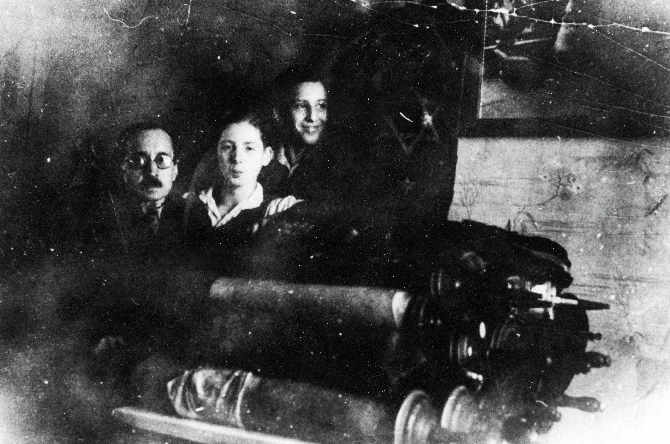
David Zwingerman (right) with Horst Löwenstein (centre) and the Jewish tea importer from England with the Torah scrolls the two boys saved from the Markgraf-Albrecht-Strasse synagogue in 1938

David Hamilton (born David Zwingerman) (24 September 1923 – 10 February 2007) was a British businessman who escaped from Nazi Germany as a boy before the Second World War on the first Kindertransport ship to England. He subsequently made a fortune in real estate and fashion but worries over the possibility of another Holocaust caused him to place much of his money in a foundation in Liechtenstein, the division of which became a source of bitter legal wrangling after his death.

== Early life in Germany ==
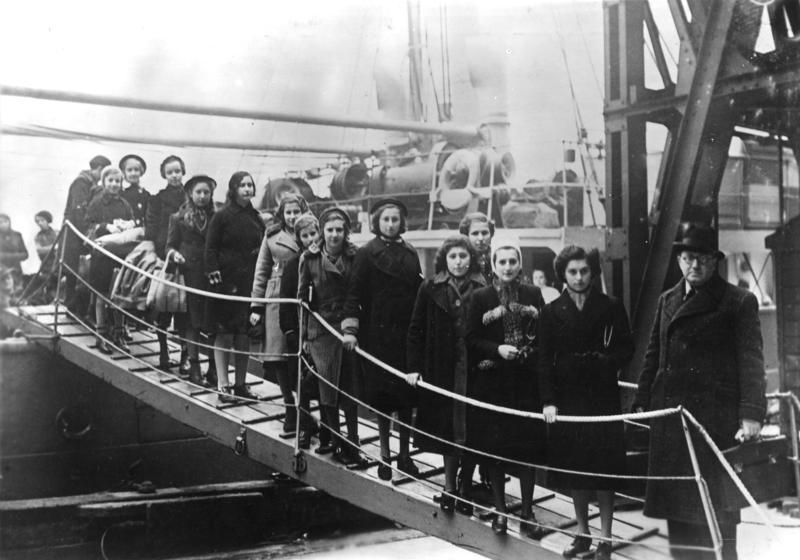
Arrival of Jewish refugee children, port of London, February 1939

David Hamilton was born David Zwingerman in Berlin on 24 September 1923 to Abraham Zwingerman and Paula Vortefflisch. He was in Berlin at the time of the November 1938 pogrom when their synagogue at Markgraf-Albrecht-Strasse was burned. On 10 November 1938, Zwingerman and his younger friend Horst Löwenstein discovered 12 undamaged Torah scrolls which had been stored within the Torah ark and had been protected from the fire by its thick oak doors. Zwingerman later wrote to Hermann Simon that they took the scrolls into the street: "Nazis in uniform, supporters and onlookers, were on the steps, the sidewalk, and in the street ... I tried to hail a taxi and managed to get one. Luckily, the driver, a White Russian by birth, was willing to take the Torah scrolls". Zwingerman's mother arranged for the scrolls to be stored with a Jewish tea importer from England; they were later returned to the local congregation.

Elieser Ehrenreich (1883–1941, d. Ravensbrück) learned of the boys' actions and tried to make arrangements for them to leave Germany. David Zwingerman left on 2 December 1938 on the first Kindertransport to England. Ehrenreich wrote to the Department for Youth and Welfare in January 1939: "We have already written to you in support of the emigration of the two boys Horst Löwenstein and David Zwingerman, who committed an act of self-sacrifice in helping to save 12 Torah Scrolls .... Horst Löwenstein is still waiting for his final exit permit. We would be most grateful if this boy could also soon enjoy the benefits of being sent away". The permit apparently never came and Löwenstein died in Riga, Latvia, on 30 November 1941.

== Life in England ==
In 1946, Zwingerman married Laura Dicks in Hendon. He became a naturalised British citizen and in 1951 changed his name to Hamilton. David and Laura had two children, Alan S. Hamilton (born 1947), now an accountant based in New York City, and Carolyn Hamilton (born 1951), now a barrister in London who specialises in children's rights.

== Career ==
Hamilton made a fortune in Britain in fashion and real estate. He traded as a clothing manufacturer and in 1958 incorporated Hamilton & Ray Limited with the designer Georgina Florence Ray, which operated from Great Portland Street. The firm still exists and is now run by his daughter Carolyn Hamilton. By 1986, David Hamilton and Georgina Ray shared the directorship of 17 different companies.

== Death ==
Hamilton died on 10 February 2007 in London. He was buried in Edgware. In his will, he left £500,000 of his £4.5 million estate to his wife and the balance to be split between his two children. He also had £3.2 million in a Liechtenstein foundation known as the Rainbow Foundation, which he had established due to worries about the possibility of another Holocaust. His daughter Carolyn received £2.2 million from the foundation but her brother Alan only £1 million, resulting in a bitter legal dispute between them about whether the money in the foundation formed part of Hamilton's estate upon death. Hamilton's son argued it did and so should have been split equally between the siblings.
