= Stadium Super Trucks =

Off-road racing series

Speed Energy Stadium Super Trucks
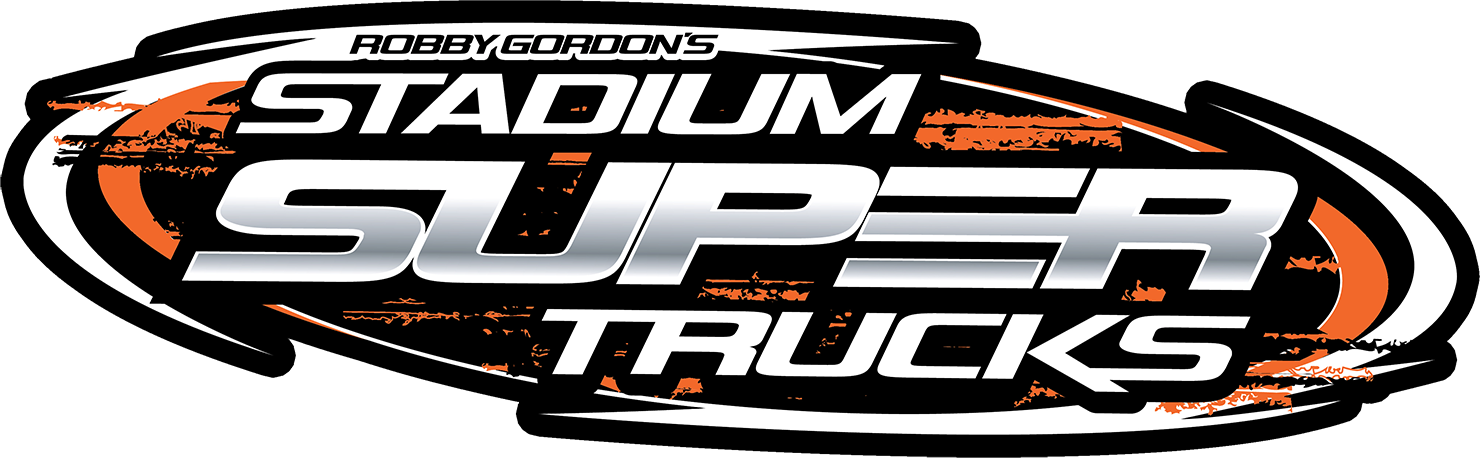
- Category: Short course off-road racing
- Country: United States; Australia
- Region: North America
- Inaugural season: 2013
- Engine suppliers: Chevrolet
- Tire suppliers: Toyo Tires; Continental Tire
- Drivers' champion: Robby Gordon
- Official website: stadiumsupertrucks.com

The Stadium Super Trucks (SST), formerly known as Speed Energy Formula Off-Road, also known as the Boost Mobile Super Trucks in Australia, is an American short course off-road racing series created by off-road racer and former IndyCar and NASCAR driver Robby Gordon in 2013. Sanctioned by the United States Auto Club (USAC) in America with title sponsorship from Gordon's Speed Energy brand, the series utilizes identical off-road trucks that originally competed primarily in American football stadiums, but in 2014 began racing mostly on street circuits and road courses, often in conjunction with the IndyCar Series race schedules.

From 2015 to 2021, the series also raced in Australia in support of the Supercars Championship. In 2020 and 2021, SST operated the Boost Mobile Super Trucks championship, which was sanctioned by Motorsport Australia and promoted by Boost Mobile.

As of 2025, Max Gordon is the most recent SST champion. Matthew Brabham and Robby Gordon are tied with the most titles with three championships each, while two-time champion Sheldon Creed is the all-time leader in race wins with 39.

== History ==
By 2011, there was speculation that after his NASCAR career was over, Robby Gordon would bring back the concept of stadium off-road racing that Mickey Thompson had invented. Gordon announced the formation of the Stadium Super Trucks (SST) on May 29, 2012, modeling the series after Thompson's MTEG stadium series; early in his career, Gordon won the 1989 MTEG championship as a 20-year-old. Gordon compared the concept of SST to that of the International Race of Champions; drivers and/or sponsors could take over a team for a year but the series provided everything else. The trucks held an exhibition race at Crandon International Off-Road Raceway after the conclusion of the World Championship races on September 2.

The Stadium Super Trucks began with a twelve-race season in 2013. The series held their first official race at the University of Phoenix Stadium on April 6, 2013. The race was won by Rob MacCachren, Justin Matney finished second, and Gordon passed the flipped-over truck of P. J. Jones on the final lap for third. Gordon and MacCachren battled throughout the 2013 season, and Gordon won the championship by seven points. As support events, the series scheduled monster trucks, quad bikes and Side by Side UTVs.

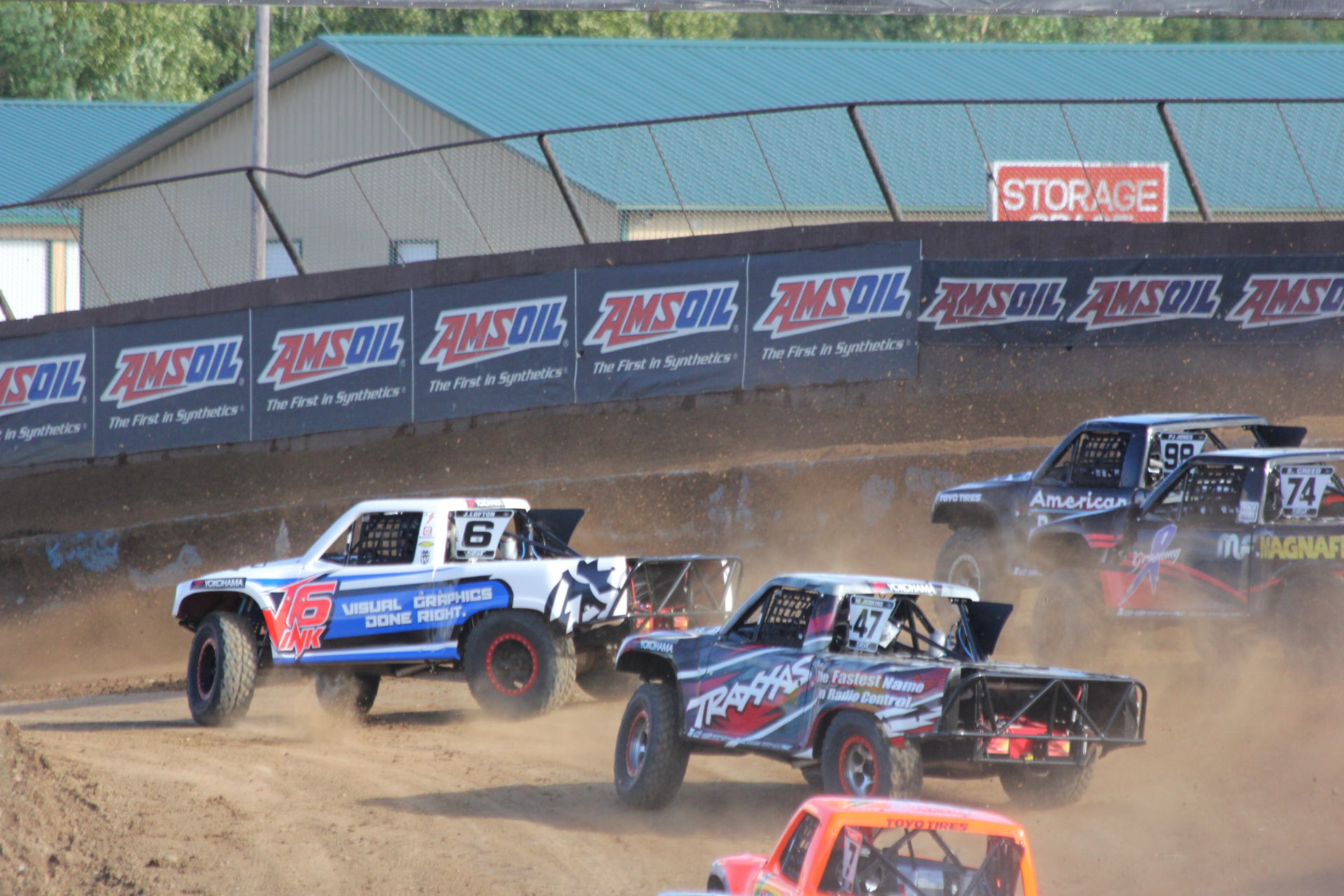
Race at Crandon in 2013

On December 11, 2013, Gordon announced the series would be among the events held at the X Games Austin in 2014. On March 4, 2014, the series was renamed to Speed Energy Formula Off-Road presented by Traxxas with the trucks retaining the SST name, though the Formula Off-Road branding was quietly reverted by 2016. The series' X Games final was held at Circuit of the Americas on June 8. Apdaly Lopez won the gold medal; Sheldon Creed and Gordon earned silver and bronze, respectively. The 2014 season also saw the series expand outside the United States and Canada by participating at the Race of Champions in Barbados. In 2016, SST held the Mike's Peak Hill Climb Challenge at Mike's Sky Rancho in Baja California. Beyond North America, the trucks had demonstrations in the Mongolian desert in 2016 and 2019, while the 2017 schedule included a race in China at Beijing National Stadium.

On September 23, 2014, sponsorship marketing company The Elevation Group purchased a 40 percent stake in the series. In 2015, the series entered a partnership with all-terrain vehicle manufacturer Arctic Cat, which led to the creation of the Arctic Cat Stadium Side-by-Side (SXS) Racing Series as a support series to the SST.

Although stadiums were gradually phased out in favor of street courses, SST returned to the former in December 2017 with the inaugural Stadium Super Trucks World Championship Finals in California's Lake Elsinore Diamond baseball park. Although he did not compete in the weekend due to a rib injury, Paul Morris clinched the 2017 championship with Jerett Brooks driving his No. 67 truck. During the 2018 season, SST organized the Robby Gordon Off-Road World Championships at Glen Helen Raceway from November 30 to December 2. To close out the season, SST returned to the Race of Champions in 2019, now held in Mexico City, as both a competing category for ROC drivers and a standalone points race. Matthew Brabham ended the season with his first series championship.

In March 2021, SST partnered with the newly formed Great American Shortcourse (GAS) series to organize a championship weekend and the Off Road Race of Champions (ORROC), the latter of which was to take place at King of the Hammers; ORROC intended to have GAS class champions compete in stadium trucks with the winner receiving a full-time seat in SST for the 2022 season. However, neither took place due to scheduling conflicts such as Gordon racing in the Baja 1000 and running his Speed UTV company.

=== Racing in Australia ===
With the support of driver Craig Dontas and former Adelaide 500 general manager Nathan Cayzer, SST expanded into Australia for the 2015 season. In May, the trucks were invited to the Goodwood Festival of Speed in England.

In May 2018, Gordon formed a three-year partnership with Boost Mobile to keep the series in Australia beyond 2019. As part of the agreement, the series' Australian operations were handled by Cayzer and Morris' Paul Morris Motorsport. However, in September, the Confederation of Australian Motor Sport (CAMS, now known as Motorsport Australia) revoked their license over safety concerns, a decision particularly spurred by an incident in the May race at Barbagallo Raceway in which Matt Nolan's truck's wheel came off during a wreck and hit a spectator bridge. A court hearing overseen by the Supreme Court of Victoria took place a month later. The series' defense, led by Queen's Counsel barrister Stewart Anderson, said new wheels would be built with forged billet aluminium that makes them heavier and less likely to detach than the current cast alloy. Retired Supercar driver Larry Perkins also gave his support after inspecting them earlier in the year, comparing the trucks' safety to the Supercars. Anderson further stated CAMS and SST had formed an agreement in February in which the former expressed satisfaction at the series, yet CAMS made the decision to suspend the series in May and did not inform SST officials until July, which Gordon stated was a breach of contract. On October 11, judge John Digby ruled in favor of CAMS. Six days after the ruling, the series aligned with the Australian Auto Sport Alliance's Australian Motor Racing Series (AMRS) to remain in the country. The AASA, which is not affiliated with CAMS, and the NSW Sport and Recreation approved SST for competition in AMRS events following a risk assessment. The trucks' first race weekend under the AMRS banner took place nine days later at the Sydney Motorsport Park.

On August 20, 2019, CAMS and SST announced they had reached an agreement to lift the ban and form a three-year commercial rights contract. Six days later, Adelaide 500 officials confirmed the series would make its return at the 2020 edition in February with safety improvements like smaller ramps. SST's first race in Australia since the ban's conclusion took place in October 2019 with the Gold Coast 600 weekend at Surfers Paradise Street Circuit.

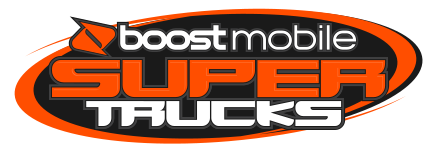
Boost Mobile Super Trucks logo used from series’ origin in 2020

Following the series' return, the trucks' identity in the country became known as the Boost Mobile Super Trucks. As part of the new branding, starting in 2020, SST split into American and Australian championships called the Speed Energy Stadium Super Trucks and Boost Mobile Super Trucks, respectively. While both divisions had their separate standings and champions, they also conducted a co-sanctioned weekend together at Adelaide. The Boost Mobile Super Truck operations were based at Paul Morris Motorsport's Norwell Motorplex in Norwell, Queensland.

Supercars was acquired by Race Australia Consolidated Enterprises in 2021, and the new ownership failed to reach an agreement with the Boost Mobile Super Trucks to continue supporting the series for 2022. Boost Mobile head Peter Adderton, who attempted to buy Supercars, criticized RACE and claimed the consortium saw little value in the trucks despite their popularity. 12 stadium trucks were returned to the United States on January 19, 2022. Conversely, new Supercars CEO Shane Howard told Auto Action in February that he believed the trucks were sent back due to ATA Carnet import laws, but he was open to bringing them back in 2023.

A return was secured for the 2024 Adelaide 500. SST and Motorsport Australia clashed again during the weekend when two accidents in practice led to a hearing with the federation. The series was eventually cleared to proceed with the round, though with its four-race slate reduced to two. The series did not return to Australia in the 2025 season.

== Drivers ==
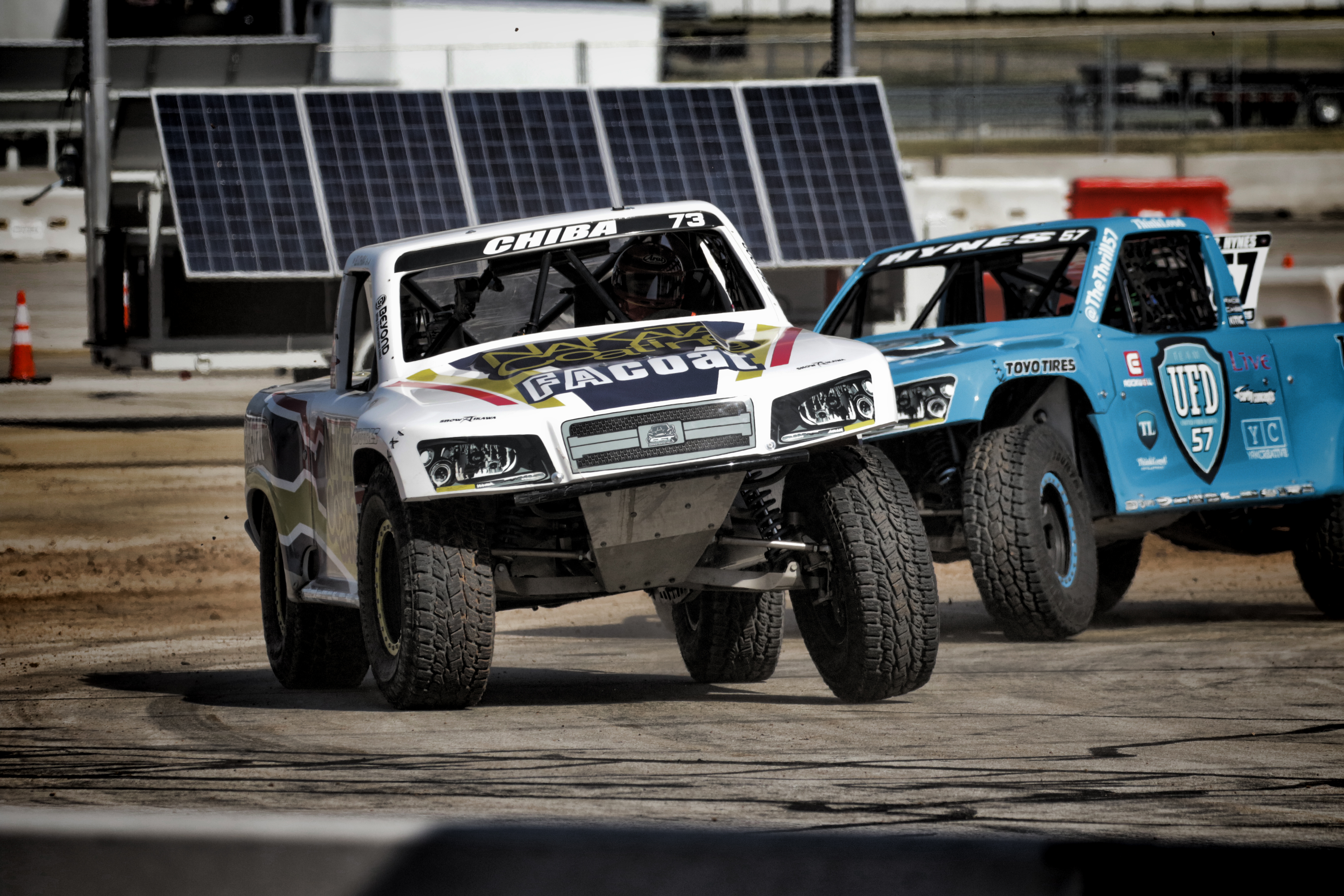
Japanese rally driver E. J. Chiba leads Bill Hynes at Texas Motor Speedway in 2018

The series typically features drivers who are familiar with off-road racing; during the inaugural season, off-road racers included Robby Gordon, Championship Off-Road Racing driver Rob MacCachren, TORC driver Sheldon Creed and motocross rider Jeff Ward. The 2013 season also featured those from other disciplines, like Arie Luyendyk Jr. and Paul Tracy (IndyCar), Nick Baumgartner (Olympic snowboarding) and Traxxas owner Mike Jenkins. Two-wheel riders such as Moto X biker Jeremy Stenberg and four-time AMA Supercross Championship winner Ryan Villopoto also have experience in SST, while other off-road competitors who have dabbled in the series include Dakar Rally champion Toby Price.

Like Gordon, other NASCAR drivers have competed in the series. At X Games Austin 2015, among the NASCAR competitors were 1989 NASCAR Winston Cup Series champion Rusty Wallace, road course ringer Boris Said, and former Nationwide Series driver and eleven-time X Games medalist Travis Pastrana. P. J. Jones also made starts for Gordon's Robby Gordon Motorsports team in NASCAR, while Justin Lofton raced in NASCAR with Speed Energy sponsorship. Other NASCAR veterans who have raced in the series include Casey Mears, the son of off-road and stadium truck racer Roger Mears, and Greg Biffle.

Gordon's other former discipline IndyCar has also seen crossovers into SST. In addition to those with experience in stock cars like Jones, Champ Car veteran Max Papis and 2003 champion Paul Tracy have run races; the 2016 Honda Indy Toronto round featured all three drivers. Former IndyCar driver E. J. Viso, who led the most laps and finished second in his SST debut, has seven wins.

When racing in Australia, SST and Boost Mobile Super Trucks events also feature those from the Supercars Championship and its support series. SST's first race in the country at Adelaide in 2015 saw Supercar driver Nathan Pretty make his series debut, while 2014 Bathurst 1000 victor Paul Morris won the SST championship in 2017. Russell Ingall, winner of the 2005 V8 Supercar Championship Series, began competing in the trucks in 2018. Drivers from the support level include Aussie Racing Cars' Matt Nolan and the Super2 Series' Jake Kostecki.

In 2016, motocross rider Sara Price became the first female driver in series history when she made her debut at Toronto.

== Tracks ==
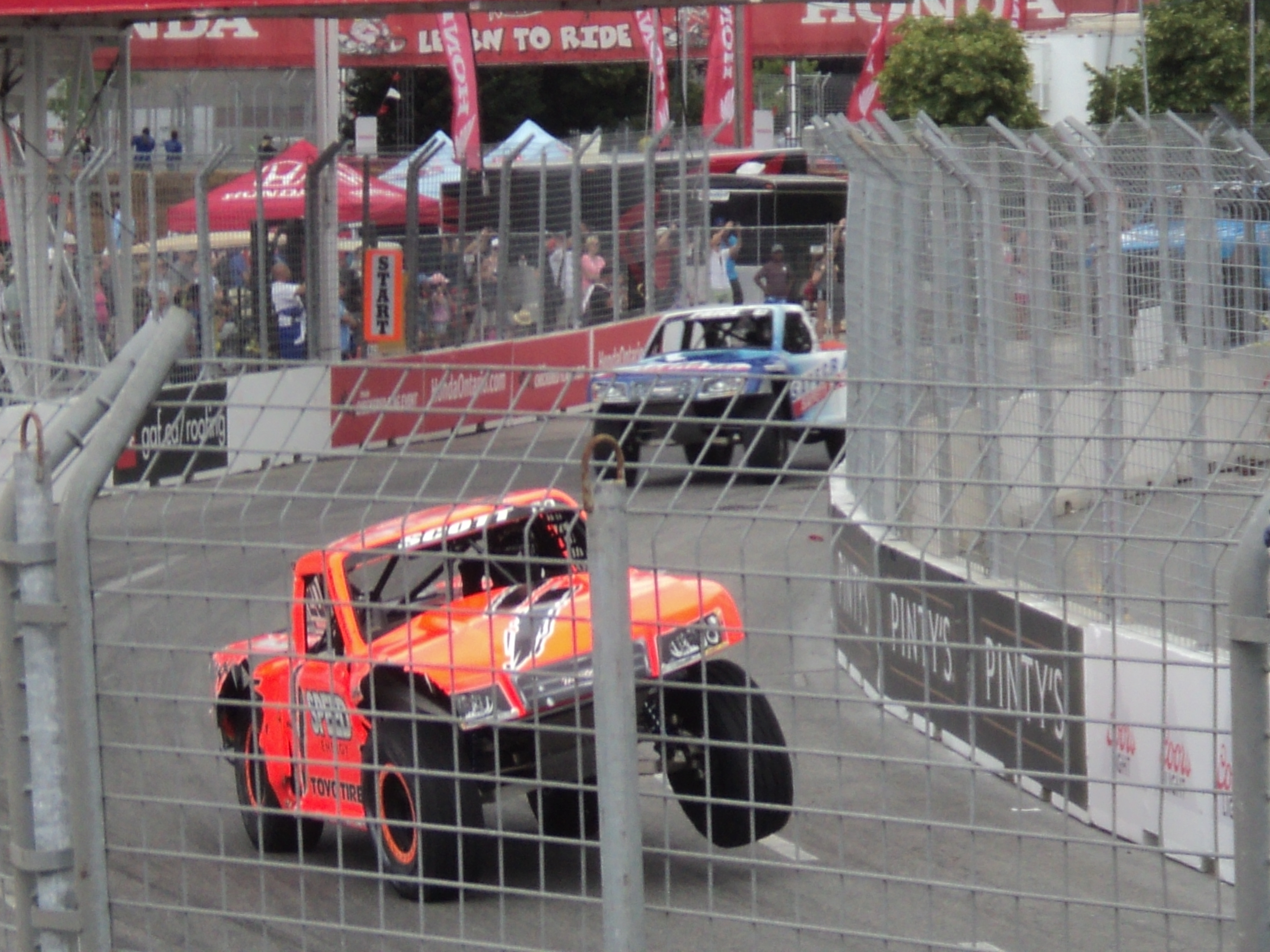
Dustin Scott and Toby Price racing at Honda Indy Toronto in 2016

During its first season, the series raced predominantly in football stadiums, such as University of Phoenix Stadium, the Los Angeles Memorial Coliseum, and the Edward Jones Dome, with a dirt track laid out on the field while also running on street circuits as a supporting event for the IndyCar Series. The trucks also ran a race at Crandon International Off-Road Raceway.

Eventually, SST focused almost exclusively on street courses like the Long Beach Grand Prix, Honda Indy Toronto, Detroit Belle Isle Grand Prix, and Grand Prix of St. Petersburg. Gordon claimed the switch away from stadiums came due to pressure from Feld Entertainment, who oversees stadium events like Monster Jam and the AMA Supercross Championship and wanted venue exclusivity for its brands. Despite losing the stadiums, he felt the transition to street circuits "brings [the trucks] to a completely different fan audience." On the street courses, aluminum ramps are placed on the track; the ramps are 17 feet, 6 inches long and 2'8" high, and trucks enter them at speeds of 70 miles per hour (110 km/h).

In June 2017, the series made its debut on an oval track at Texas Motor Speedway, running as a support event for IndyCar's Rainguard Water Sealers 600. Although stadiums decreased in hosting races over time, SST continued to occasionally race in such venues. For instance, in July 2017, the first Chinese-based SST event was held with Monster Jam at Beijing National Stadium.

The series' Australian racing began in 2015 with rounds at the Adelaide Street Circuit as a support for the V8 Supercars' Adelaide 500. Further Australian events were held at the Surfers Paradise Street Circuit with the Gold Coast 600, the Valvoline Raceway for the Ultimate Sprintcar Championship, and the Homebush Street Circuit for the Sydney 500. In 2017, SST ran at Barbagallo Raceway as an undercard for the Perth SuperSprint, marking the first time the series raced on a permanent circuit. Later in the season, the series raced at the Hidden Valley Raceway in Darwin as part of the Supercars' Darwin Triple Crown weekend. In 2020, the trucks joined the Supercars' Auckland SuperSprint round at Pukekohe Park Raceway, their first time in New Zealand.

SST has also supported NASCAR events. In 2017, they began racing at Road America alongside the Xfinity Series' Johnsonville 180, while they supported the NASCAR Cup Series' O'Reilly Auto Parts 500 weekend at Texas Motor Speedway in 2019.

== Trucks ==
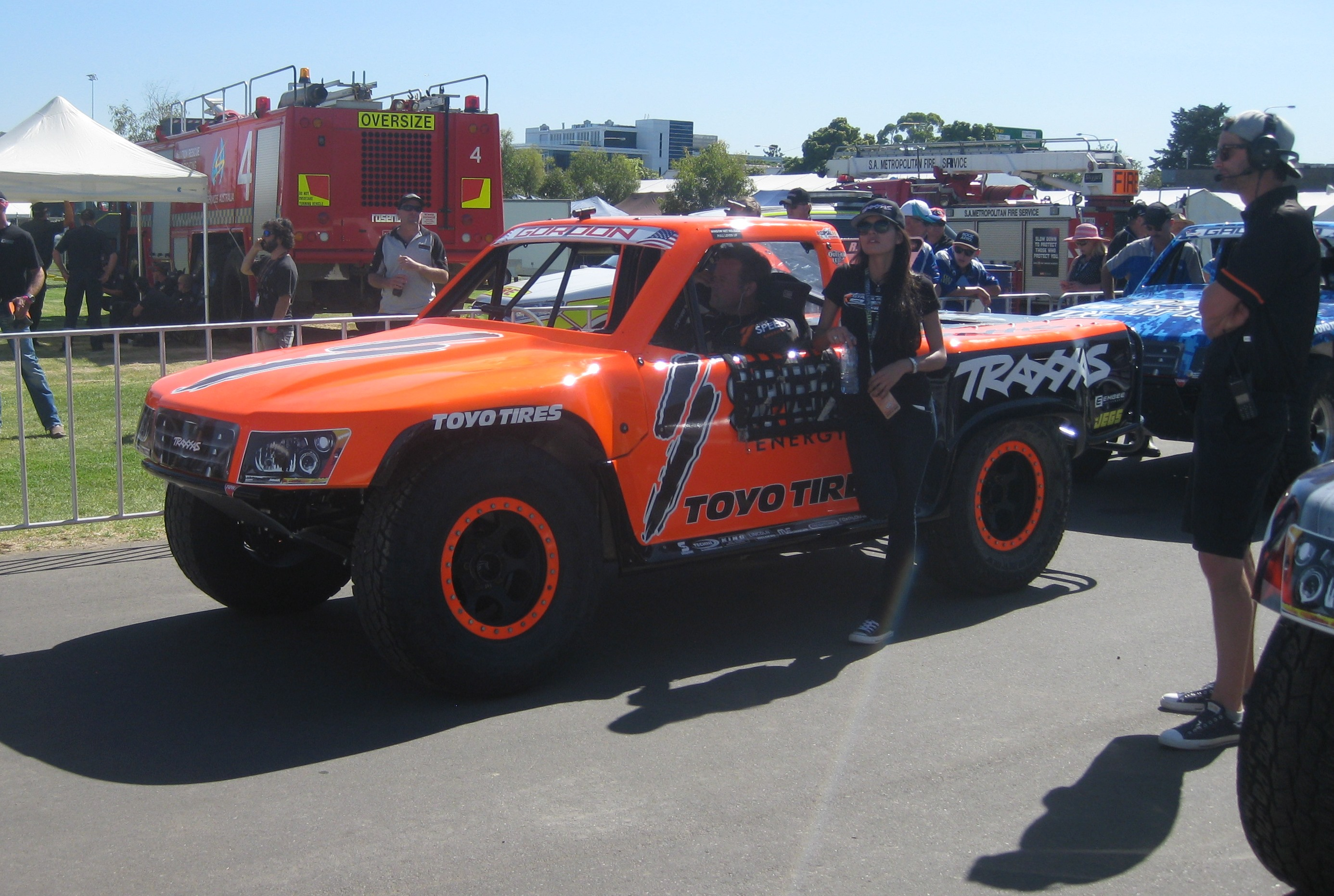
The Stadium Super Truck of Robby Gordon at the 2015 Clipsal 500 Adelaide

Powered by a 600 hp (450 kW) Chevrolet LS V8 engine, the trucks weigh 2,900 pounds (1,300 kg) and are built with a steel-tube frame and fiberglass body. The trucks are 13'5" (4.09 m) long and 5'2" (1.57 m) high, feature a three-speed transmission and can reach speeds as high as 140 mph (230 km/h). A portion of the frame protects the driver from rolls. Next to the driver is a 5-US-gallon (19 L) jug that catches fluids which may have spilled from damage that the truck sustains. Each truck may race with tires from Toyo Tires or Continental Tire, while Hawk Performance provides brake pads. During the series' inaugural season, Toyo was one of three tire brands alongside Pro Comp and Yokohama.

The trucks are identical to each other, though drivers are allowed to change some aspects of their trucks, such as the spring rates, ride heights and camber. Drivers receive their trucks on race weekends via random draw, which ensures they do not have the same vehicle for each race, but they may swap with others if they are unsatisfied with their current one. Gordon, who departed NASCAR with the belief that the top teams had a large advantage over the smaller teams due to the amount of money spent, designed the trucks as such as he wanted SST to be a "drivers' series". He described the stadium trucks as resembling Monster Jam trucks for their size and NASCAR and IndyCar vehicles for their ability to handle in corners.

== Media coverage ==
In 2013, the SST events were televised tape-delayed on NBC and NBC Sports Network; seven on NBC, and five on NBCSN. Most of the twelve races in 2013 were televised on Sunday afternoons.

In 2014 and 2015, NBCSN returned to broadcast the season's races, with the exception of ABC who broadcast the X Games. However during the 2015 season, CBS Sports Network replaced NBCSN to broadcast the tape-delayed races. CBS Sports Network would continue to provide coverage of the SST races (with some exceptions) up until the end of the 2018 season. Races held in Australia, were covered by Supercars media, along with Fox Sports Australia.

Since 2019, the races are now live streamed on the series' YouTube and Facebook pages.

=== Video games ===
The trucks have been featured in various video games as playable vehicles.

Robby Gordon's #7 Speed Energy truck appears in an expansion pack for the 2014 game Forza Horizon 2.

Codemasters' Grid Legends and Project CARS 3, as well as Reiza Studios' Automobilista series have also included SST-style trucks in their games.

== Race format ==
A race weekend is three days long, with qualifying on the first and two races on Saturday and Sunday. Races are split into either 12 laps or 20 minutes depending on which is completed first, while competition cautions are used at the halfway point to group the drivers together for closer racing to the finish. A standing start is used to begin a race, while restarts utilize rolling starts.

American SST races are sanctioned by the United States Auto Club (USAC), with racing decisions being overseen by a race control unit. Radio communication between the two and drivers is one-way, which allows for messages from the former to be available for all drivers, though competitors cannot respond to Race Control nor USAC. In Australia, Motorsport Australia served as the sanctioning body.

Points are awarded based on finishing position, with bonus points given for the fastest qualifier, heat race winner, the driver who leads the most laps in the main event, and for each position gained in a race. A driver may also earn points on behalf of another by racing with their number plate. At the end of a race weekend and season, the driver with the most total points is named the overall weekend winner; ties are broken based on wins followed by the best finish in the final event.

The Boost Mobile Super Trucks had their own points system that provided just one bonus point to the fastest qualifier. If a race was suspended after 50–75 percent of the duration had been completed, half points were to be awarded. A full payout would be given if more than 75 percent of the race had been completed.

Stadium Super Trucks points system
Points	Position														
Points	1st	2nd	3rd	4th	5th	6th	7th	8th	9th	10th	11th	12th	13th	14th	15th
Heat	12	10	8	7	5	4	3	2	1						
Final	25	22	20	18	16	15	14	13	12	11	10	9	8	7	6

Bonuses
Most laps led	3
Position gained	1
Fastest qualifier	1

Boost Mobile Super Trucks points system: 1st / 2nd / 3rd / 4th / 5th / 6th / 7th / 8th / 9th / 10th / 11th / 12th; 12 / 11 / 10 / 9 / 8 / 7 / 6 / 5 / 4 / 3 / 2 / 1	Bonuses: Fastest qualifier / 1

== Champions and winners ==
=== Champions ===
==== North America ====
Season	Driver	No.(s)	Races	W	Podiums	FQ	Pts.	Margin
2013	(United States) Robby Gordon	7	14 of 14	3	12	3	407	7
2014	(United States) Robby Gordon	7	16 of 16	6	14	5	492	75
2015	(United States) Sheldon Creed	74	22 of 22	9	13	6	617	33
2016	(United States) Sheldon Creed	1	20 of 21	12	15	4	645	75
2017	(Australia) Paul Morris	67	22 of 22^{1}	3	10	3	546	1
2018	(Australia) Matthew Brabham	83	20 of 20	6	14	5	540	50
2019	(Australia) Matthew Brabham	83	19 of 19	5	13	4	476	54
2021	(Australia) Matthew Brabham	83	10 of 10	2	4	10	296	26
2022	(United States) Gavin Harlien	55	8 of 8	3	5	1	216	25
2023	(United States) Gavin Harlien	55	4 of 4	0	3	0	100	10
2024	(United States) Robby Gordon	7	4 of 4	2	3	1	114	13
2025	(United States) Max Gordon	77	2 of 2	1	2	2	62	1

==== Australia ====
Season	Driver	No.(s)	Races	W	Podiums	FQ	Pts.	Margin
2021	(Australia) Paul Morris	67	9 of 9	4	6	0	93	0^{2}

- ^{1} – Jerett Brooks drove the No. 67 truck at Lake Elsinore, with all points going to Morris.
- ^{2} – Morris was tied with Shae Davies in points, but Morris held the tiebreaker with four race wins to Davies' two.

==== By driver ====
Total	Driver	Seasons
3	Matthew Brabham	2018, 2019, 2021 (NA)
3	Robby Gordon	2013, 2014, 2024
2	Sheldon Creed	2015, 2016
2	Paul Morris	2017, 2021 (AU)
2	Gavin Harlien	2022, 2023

=== All-time winners ===
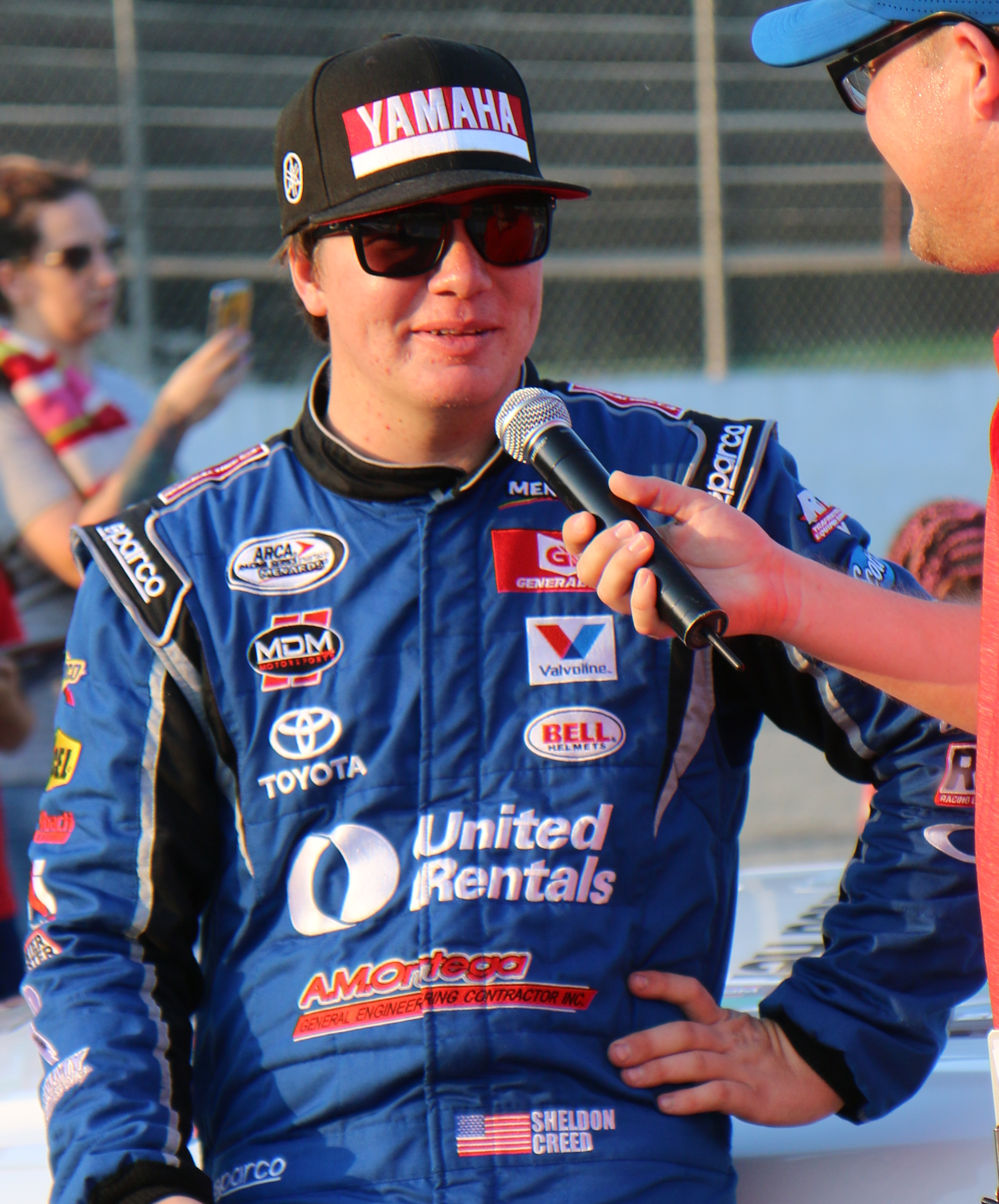
Two-time SST champion Sheldon Creed has the most wins in series history with 39.

Figures correct as of the 2026 Stadium Super Trucks race weekend at the Grand Prix of Long Beach (April 18–19, 2026).

Key
*	Champion
#	Driver competed in the 2026 Stadium Super Trucks

Driver	Wins
Sheldon Creed *	39
Robby Gordon * #	32
Matthew Brabham * #	27
Gavin Harlien *	12
Paul Morris *	7
E. J. Viso	7
Max Gordon #	5
Burt Jenner	4
Rob MacCachren	4
Apdaly Lopez	4
P. J. Jones	4
Keegan Kincaid	4
Cole Potts	4
Shae Davies	3
Justin Lofton	3
Arie Luyendyk Jr.	3
Robert Stout	3
Jerett Brooks	2
Myles Cheek #	2
Jeff Hoffman	2
Paul Weel	2
Craig Dontas	1
Bill Hynes #	1
Blade Hildebrand	1
Matt Mingay	1
Toby Price	1
Scotty Steele	1
