= OC Fair & Event Center =

Fairgrounds in Costa Mesa, Orange County, California

- Interactive map of OC Fair & Event Center
- Address: 88 Fair Dr.
- Location: Costa Mesa, California
- Coordinates: 33°40′0″N 117°54′4″W
- Owner: State of California
- Operator: 32nd District Agricultural Association

Construction
- Opened: 1949

Website
- www.ocfair.com/ocf2/

The OC Fair & Event Center (OCFEC) is a 150-acre (0.61 km^{2}) event venue in Costa Mesa, California. The site hosts over 150 events attracting 4.3 million visitors annually, and is home to the Orange County Fair, Centennial Farm, Costa Mesa Speedway, and Pacific Amphitheatre.

The OCFEC is managed by the 32nd District Agricultural Association, a state special-purpose district in the Division of Fairs and Expositions of the California Department of Food and Agriculture formed in 1949. Its board is appointed by the Governor of California.

== Facilities ==
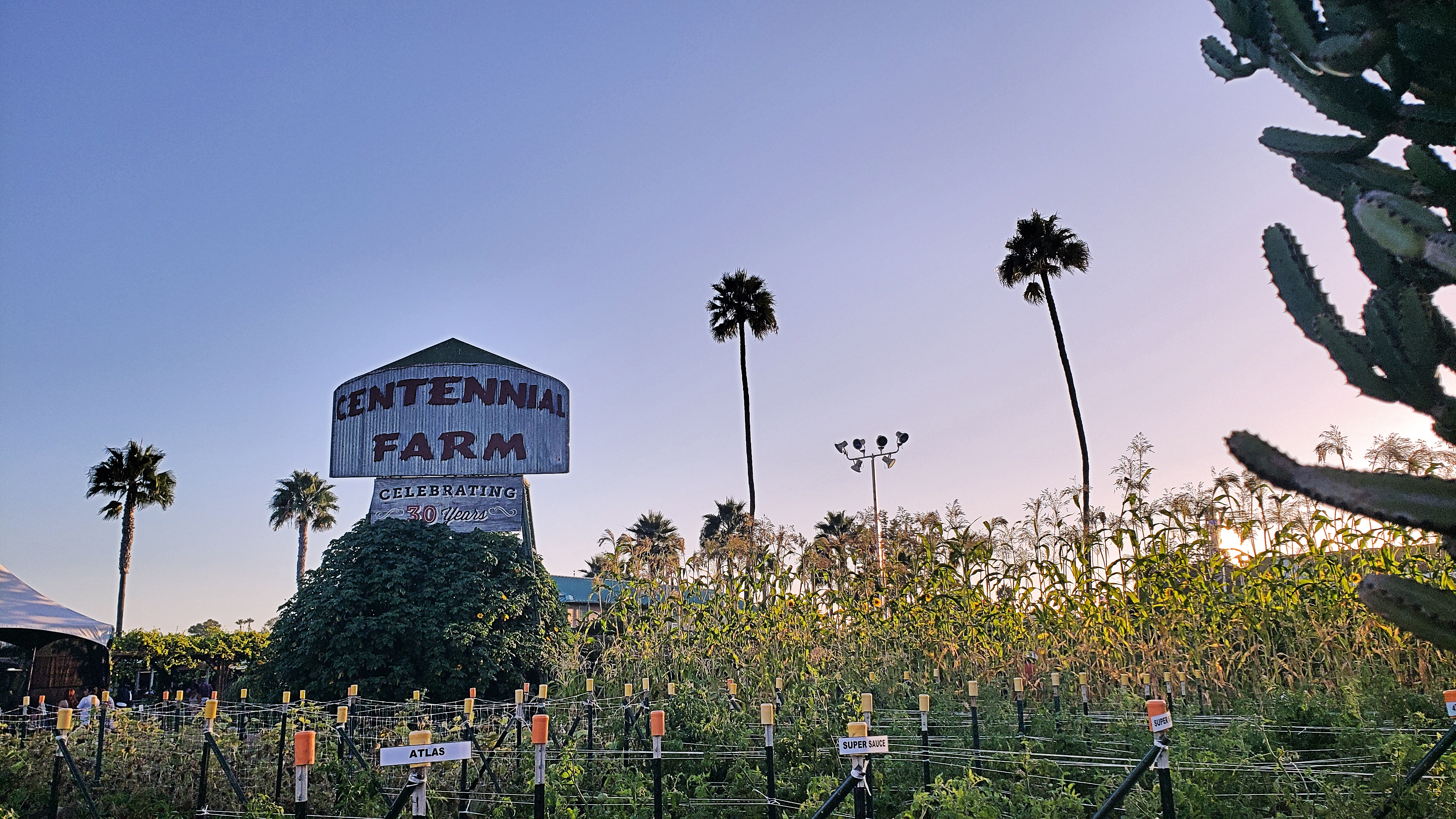
Centennial Farm in 2022

- Centennial Farm is a year-round working farm for educating youth about agriculture located in the southwest of the property. The Farm has fruit and vegetable gardens as well as livestock barns. One of the barns was originally part of the Newport Harbor Buffalo Ranch, a local 1950s-era theme park that closed in 1959.
- Heroes Hall is a year-round veterans museum and education center that is dedicated to telling the stories of Orange County veterans, and is located in the southwest of the property. The museum is housed in a rehabilitated building that used to be one of the barracks on the Santa Ana Army Air Base, which was sat in the fairgrounds' current location. They have an exhibit about the old base.
- The Equestrian Center is a year-round, privately operated horse boarding and training facility in the northeast of the site. The facility has a boarding capacity of 188 horses with four riding arenas, three hot walkers, turnout pens, storage lockers and ample parking. Center staff are available for full- or part-time training and riding lessons for people of all experience levels.
- Pacific Amphitheatre is an outdoor arena seating approximately 8,000. Its season runs from July through September.
- Action Sports Arena is a 7,000 seat arena and performance venue activated during the annual Orange County Fair, and home to Costa Mesa Speedway events.
- The Hangar is an indoor concert venue activated during the annual Orange County Fair, and used for various year-round events including Fight Club OC.

== History ==
The Orange County Community Fair Corporation sponsored the first county fair in 1890 in Santa Ana, the county seat. In 1894, it was taken over by another group, the Orange County Fair Association. In 1916, it was passed again to the Orange County Farm Bureau, before passing to an Orange County Fair Board in 1925, when it was relocated to Anaheim.

After World War II, the state formed the current association and purchased land then occupied by the Santa Ana Army Air Base for use as the fairgrounds, which became part of the City of Costa Mesa at the latter's incorporation in 1953.

On March 18, 2009, this venue was also the host of a town hall meeting held by President Barack Obama on his visit to Southern California. In 2016, then candidate Donald Trump held a campaign rally here.

=== Proposed sale ===
In May 2009, then Governor Arnold Schwarzenegger recommended the Orange County Fairgrounds be listed for sale. He had decided the fairgrounds were "surplus or underutilized" assets, although the Fair hosts more than one million visitors each year and is utilized virtually every day of the week with multiple community activities. OC Weekly reported, "What followed was a story of deception by a small group in a position of power within the fairgrounds hierarchy. Through various contractual agreements between people of wealth and power, a move was made to privatize that public land in what members of the Orange County Fairgrounds Preservation Society call one of the largest, most deliberate land grabs in the county's long history of land grabs." The Preservation Society quickly stepped in to halt the sale. They contended that the OC legislators in Sacramento had been remiss in intervening to stop the transaction, that the proposed deal to sell public land was both "Ill-advised and illegal." Both the Del Mar Fairgrounds and the Los Angeles Memorial Coliseum were saved by just such an intervention by the legislators.

A public auction was held, but before any sales agreements could be signed, there were two lawsuits filed and the sale was stopped. The Preservation Society, and Tel Phil Enterprises filed in the Court of Appeal and asked that the new governor Jerry Brown have the sale categorically dismissed. Lawsuits by two former building commissioners that Schwarzenegger had fired, however, stalled the proposed sale long enough for incoming Governor Brown to have the final word.

==== OCFEC Board of Directors response ====
After a closed session on January 27, 2011, the OCFEC Board of Directors issued the following policy statement regarding the sale of the fairgrounds:

We believe that the 32nd District Agricultural Association and Orange County Fair belong in public hands. As such, the Board of Directors have instructed its Sale Committee to engage with the Governor's office in a meaningful negotiation regarding revenue sharing as a possible way to work with the State in the financial crisis that we're experiencing.

On February 8, 2011, the 32nd District Agricultural Association sent a letter to Governor Jerry Brown, which can be viewed as a PDF at the site.

==== Gubernatorial response ====
In February 2011, California Governor Jerry Brown told the Los Angeles Times, "This is not the best time to be selling real estate. I think we have time to consider what we ought to do with that." He also said that his predecessor's plan, rather than helping California's budget crisis, would "have cost taxpayers far more in the long run." Assemblyman Jose Solorio (D-Santa Ana) stated that Brown's comments were "a good sign."
