= Championship Off-Road =

Short course off-road racing series

- Category: Short course off-road racing
- Country: United States
- Inaugural season: 2020
- Official website: champoffroad.com

Championship Off-Road, officially known as AMSOIL Championship Off-Road (as Amsoil holds the naming rights) and abbreviated to COR, is an American short course off-road racing series. Founded in 2020 and sanctioned by the International Series of Champions (ISOC), the series mainly competes in the Midwestern United States.

== History ==
TORC: The Off-Road Championship was originally the preeminent sanctioning body for short course off-road racing in the Midwest before its folding in 2018. The Lucas Oil Off Road Racing Series then took over as the main series in the region via the Lucas Oil Midwest Short Course League until its dissolution after the 2019 season as officials elected to focus on LOORRS. In October 2019, ISOC partnered with Crandon International Off-Road Raceway, Bark River Raceway, and ERX Motor Park to create Championship Off-Road.

Championship Off-Road's inaugural season in 2020 was marred by the COVID-19 pandemic, and resulting restrictions on attendance forced Bark River to cancel its races. The opener was held at ERX on July 10–11.

LOORRS released its 2021 schedule in October 2020 at only three tracks. On November 13, Lucas Oil Products announced that it has ended sponsoring and operating the LOORRS series. This closure left COR (and the dissimilar Stadium Super Trucks) as the only short course off-road racing sanctioning bodies remaining. Many of the West Coast teams raced in the Midwest for the season.

== Media ==
COR races were streamed online at Vimeo Livestream. The booth consisted of Brent Smith and Cheyne Statezny while Haley Shanley served as track reporter. CBS Sports Network assumed television rights beginning in 2022.

== Tracks ==
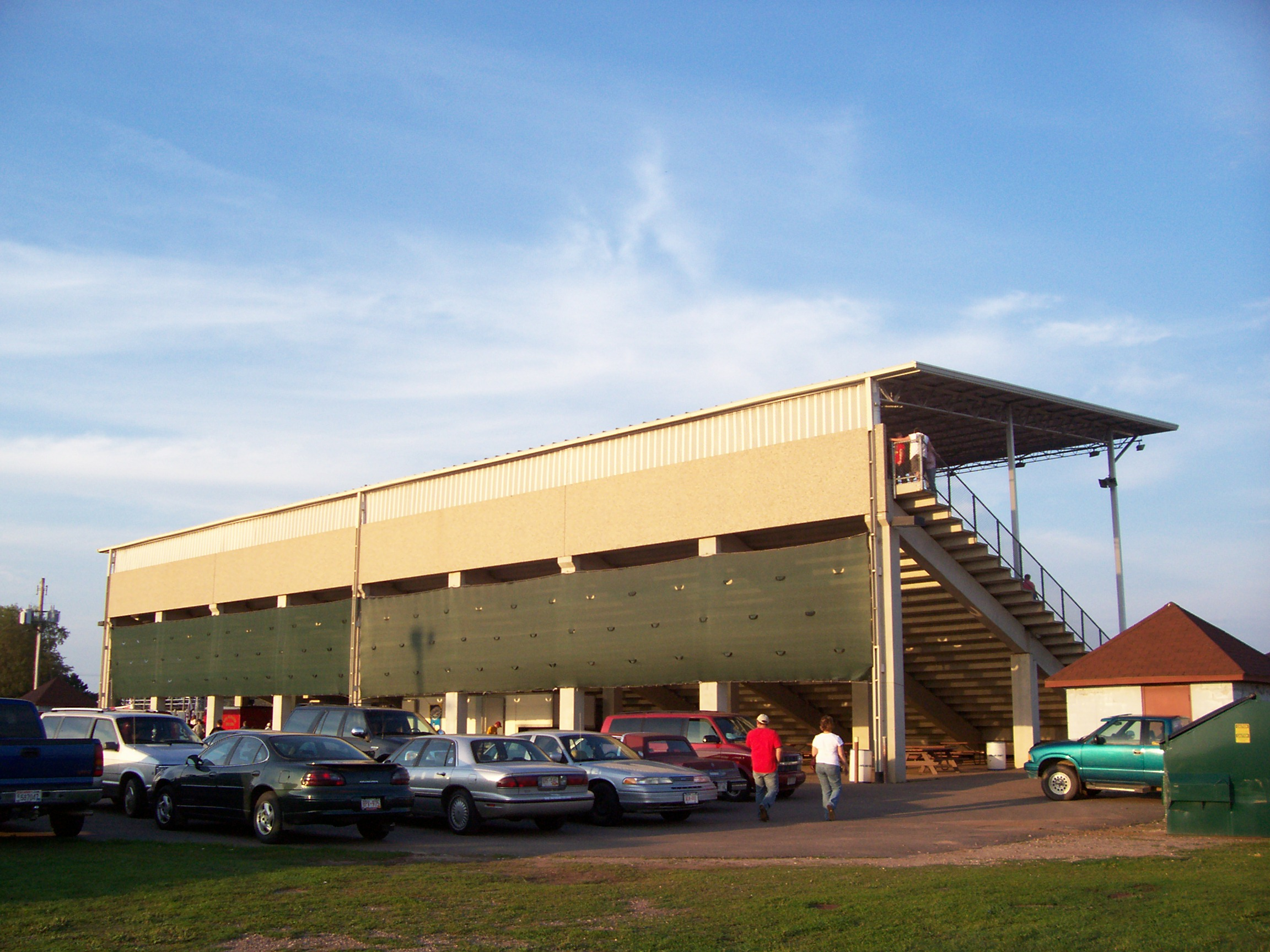
The grandstands at Antigo

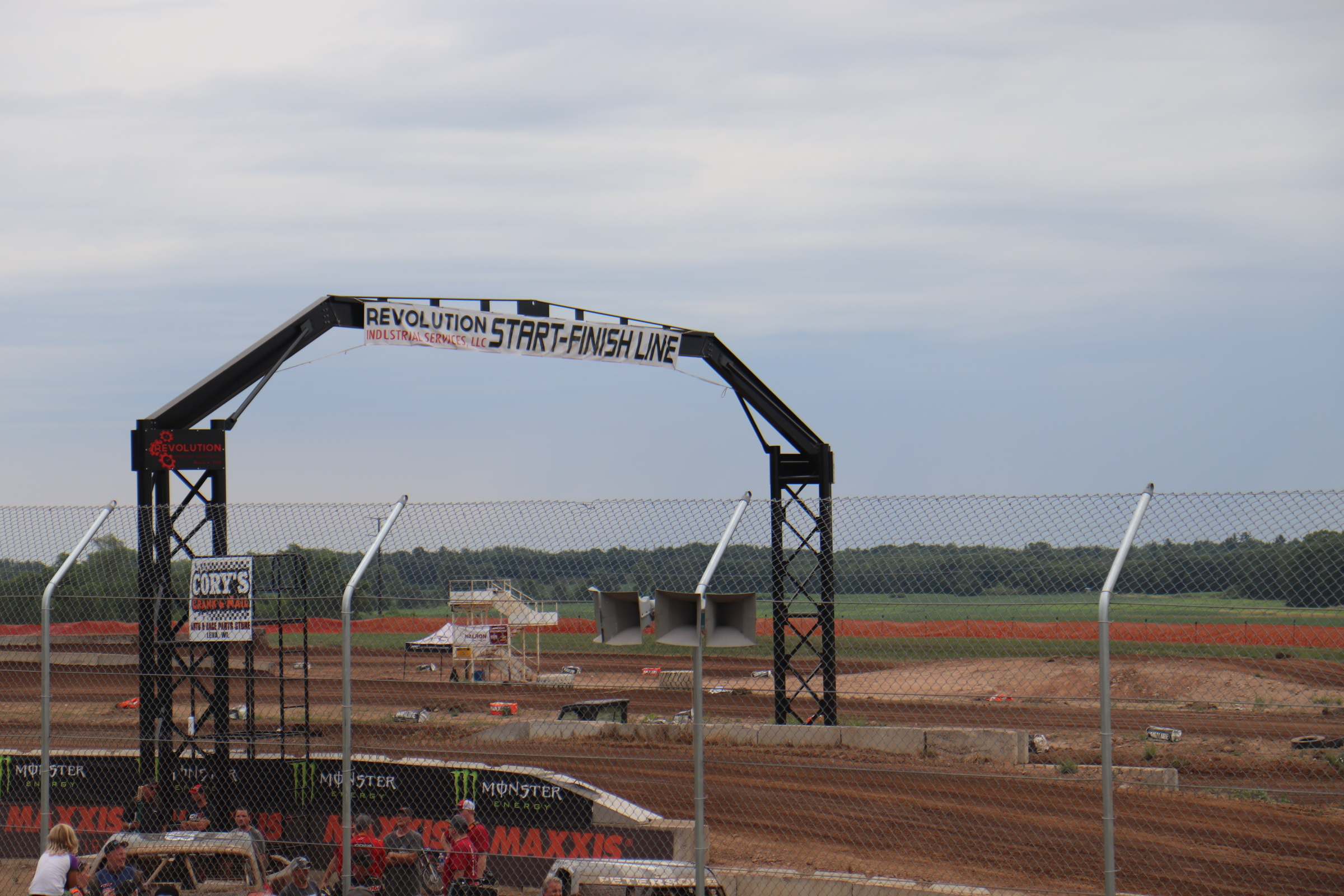
The start/finish line at Dirt City Motorplex

Track	Location	Seasons
Antigo Lions Roaring Raceway	Antigo, Wisconsin	2021–present
Bark River International Raceway	Bark River, Michigan	2020–present
Crandon International Off-Road Raceway	Crandon, Wisconsin	2020–present
Days of '76 Events Complex	Deadwood, South Dakota	2025
Dirt City Motorplex	Lena, Wisconsin	2020–present
ERX Motor Park	Elk River, Minnesota	2020–present
Glen Helen Raceway	San Bernardino, California	2025
Lucas Oil Speedway	Wheatland, Missouri	2025
MidAmerica Outdoors	Jay, Oklahoma	2023

== Champions ==
Trucks
Year	Pro 4	Pro 2	Pro 2 vs. Pro 4	Pro Lite	Pro Spec	Super Stock Truck	Stock Truck
2025	C. J. Greaves	Keegan Kincaid	RJ Anderson	Johnny Holtger	Wyatt Miller	Nick Byng	Brian Peot
2024	C. J. Greaves	Mickey Thomas	C. J. Greaves	Trey Gibbs	Dylan Parsons	Cory Holtger	Kirk Graff
2023	C. J. Greaves	Cory Winner	Keegan Kincaid	Kyle Greaves	Chad Rayford	Joe Maciosek	Cory Holtger
2022	C. J. Greaves	Jerett Brooks	Dave Mason Jr.	Kyle Greaves	Gray Leadbetter	Kyle Cooper	Cory Holtger
2021	C. J. Greaves	Keegan Kincaid	Daely Pentico	Brock Heger	Ryan Beat	Joe Maciosek	Diesel Shanak
2020	Kyle LeDuc	Kyle Kleiman	Zachery Kirchner	Johnny Holtger	-	Nick Visser	Collin Wichman

Buggies
Year	Pro Buggy	Super Buggy	1600 Light Buggy	1600 Single Buggy	Class 11
2025	Chaden Minder	-	Greg Stingle	Michael Seefeldt	Cole Whitt
2024	Jordan Bernloehr	-	Connor Schulz	John Fitzgerald	-
2023	Mark Steinhardt	-	Colin Schulz	Michael Seefeldt	Ryan Rodriguez
2022	Michael Meister	-	Colin Schulz	John Fitzgerald	-
2021	-	Michael Meister	Colin Schulz	Dylan Parsons	-
2020	Michael Hester	-	Billy Buth	Billy Buth	-

Side by Sides
Year	Pro AM Turbo SxS	Pro Stock SxS	Pro AM SxS	Sportsman SxS	570 SxS	170/200 SxS	Pro R	Youth SxS
2025	Rick Schroeder	Owen Vaneperen	Matthew Boerschinger	Code St Peter	Grayson Forseth (200), Miles Pakenham (170)	-	Kody Krantz	-
2024	C. J. Greaves	C. J. Greaves	David Gay	Brayden Kemz	Ellah Holtger	Raymond Deininger (200), Ashton Dreher (170)	-	Hudson Houle
2023	Kyle Chaney	C. J. Greaves	Bill Berger	Trent Peetz	Corbyn Wassenberg	Tanner Thibeault	-	Ryker Remington
2022	Hamish Kelsey	Brock Heger	Colin Kernz	Jacob Blemke	Ethan Dresel	Wyatt Olson	Andy Ives	-
2021	Rodney Vaneperen	Brock Heger	Dylan Marquardt	Colin Kernz	Chase Braun	Kody Krantz	-	-
2020	C. J. Greaves	C. J. Greaves	Dylan Marquardt	Dylan Marquardt	-	Ellah Holtger	-	-

Karts
Year	Mod Kart	450 Mod Karts	Short Course Kart
2025	Lincoln Mandsager	-	Gabe Holtger
2024	Avery Hemmer	-	Wesley Vande Voort
2023	Porter Inglese	-	Race Visser
2022	Porter Inglese	-	Carter Zahara
2021	Easton Sleaper	-	Ava Lawrence
2020	Easton Sleaper	John Holtger	Andy Johnson

=== Other ===
==== Classix ====
- 2020: Dale Chestnut

==== Formula 4x4 ====
- 2020: Danny Beauchamp
