= Jack Flannery =

Jack Flannery (November 22, 1952 – April 6, 2010) was an American off-road racing driver who was active in the late 1970s, 1980s and 1990s. Flannery won six short course off-road championships in Short-course Off-road Drivers Association (SODA) and one in Championship Off-Road Racing (CORR). He had over 150 event wins in his career. He was the first person from the Midwestern United States to be inducted in the Off-road Motorsports Hall of Fame and his induction was unanimous. In his induction statement, the hall of fame said that Flannery "brought short course off-road racing to the mainstream by being the first Midwest native to organize a professional off-road race team that was capable of competing against, and beating, the best off-road racers in the world."

== Personal life ==
Flannery grew up in Crandon, Wisconsin, the home of Crandon International Off-Road Raceway. His parents, Melvin and Dorothy, owned Flannery Trucking in Crandon, Wisconsin; he later ran the trucking and concrete company along with his brother Cliff. He moved to Wisconsin Dells, Wisconsin late in his racing career to construct a new home and race facility.

Flannery married Connie Fraley Flannery on July 17, 1971. They had two sons, Jamey and Jed, who both were successful off-road racers in SODA and CORR. Flannery's only grandchild, Jackson, was born in February 2010, about two months before his death. The Flannery businesses continue to be owned by Jamey, and on November 13, 2020, Jamey Flannery announced he was acquiring Crandon International Off-Road Raceway.

== Racing career ==
Flannery began racing on a snowmobile before switching to a two-wheel drive Class 6 off-road racing utility vehicle in the early 1970s. He started racing a buggy in 1974 before he moved up into full-size trucks in the late 1970s. He left the Midwest and competed in the selected Western United States desert events when he raced in the 1978 and 1979 Mint 400. In the early 1980s, he twice raced in the Canadian Off-Road Series while winning five class titles in SODA. Flannery competed in SCORE International in the Western United States during that time period.

In 1990, he won the SCORE race at Phoenix, Arizona. That same year, he won the Class F division in his Ford and was awarded the Rookie of the Year award at the Pikes Peak International Hill Climb. Flannery changed to a Chevrolet in 1991 with his "Chevy Thunder" team that he would become most known for. That year he won nine of ten events in SODA's ESPN TV-Pro series. He also won the Heavy Metal division at Pikes Peak and broke his own record by climbing the hill 22 seconds faster. In 1992 he competed at Pikes Peak, setting the record for the fastest hill climb in the Unlimited Off-Road Truck class. In 1994 he narrowly missed Class 4 Title to Greg Gerlach after a breakdown in final race of Crandon. Moreover in that same weekend had an incredible accident in the Manufacturers'Challenge race. While leading, his pick up swerved from right to left side of track and hit the finish line post, rolling down near to Parsons pond. This accident ended in many bloopers programmes, also in Italian transmission Paperissima. In 1996 he won the $125,000 Borg-Warner World championship off-road race at Crandon en route to his sixth ESPN Pro Series championship. Flannery won the major 1997 events at Crandon, winning the Governor's Cup in Spring and both his class and the Heavy Metal Borg-Warner World Championship races in fall en route to winning the 1997 SODA Class 4 championship.

Most of the drivers in SODA changed to new short course off-road racing series CORR after the 1997 season. Flannery narrowly won the 1998 CORR Pro-4 (4WD) championship over his son Jamey. Flannery won another Governor's Cup race in 1999.

== Death ==
The track announcer at the Crandon's 2008 Borg-Warner World Championship race on Labor Day weekend announced that he had been suffering the effects of cancer. He died on April 6, 2010.

Former Flannery competitors spoke about him after his death. NASCAR champion Jimmie Johnson described his truck, "...when that truck went by, you knew who it was...[he] had everyone scared and put on one hell of a show". Walker Evans said "[Flannery] had a lot of natural ability to drive. Jack set some pretty high standards... Jack was probably my most fierce competition that I ever dreamed of at Crandon."

== Legacy ==
=== Awards ===
Flannery accepted his induction in the Off-road Motorsports Hall of Fame at the fortieth Anniversary of the Crandon Off-Road Raceway during the 2009 Borg-Warner World Championship. His induction into the Off-Road Motorsports Hall of Fame was unanimous. He was the first Midwestern driver to be inducted in the hall of fame.

=== Jack Flannery Award ===
Crandon Raceway began handing out the "Jack Flannery Award of Excellence" in 2010. The award reads that it is "presented to an individual who has exhibited the determination and perseverance characteristic of the late Jack Flannery, one of off road racing's pioneer participants who, as a result of his dedication to the sport, became the first Midwestern participant to be inducted into the Off Road Motorsports Hall of Fame.

- 2010 Mike Jenkins
- 2011 Scott Taylor
- 2012 Scott Douglas
