= Championship Off-Road Racing =

Auto racing championship held in the United States

- Sport: Short course off-road racing
- Jurisdiction: United States
- Abbreviation: CORR
- Founded: 1998
- Headquarters: Newport Beach, California
- President: Jim Baldwin
- Chairman: Cissy Baldwin
- Replaced: SODA
- Closure date: 2008

Official website
- www.corracing.com

Championship Off-Road Racing (usually abbreviated CORR) was a sanctioning body for short course off-road racing in the United States. It formed in 1998 and went bankrupt in 2008. Its Midwest races were supplanted in 2007 by the Traxxas TORC Series and by the Lucas Oil Off Road Racing Series on the West Coast in 2009. Both received most of the drivers and adopted the same racing format.

== History ==
CORR was formed in 1998 by ESPN announcer Marty Reid. It displaced the SODA series at the premiere short course off-road racing series when most of the drivers in SODA moved to CORR. The series was purchased by Jim Baldwin in 2005.

Baldwin canceled two of the rounds at Las Vegas in October 2008. In a press release, he stated: "Championship Off Road Racing has made the difficult decision to cancel the Primm, Nevada race on October 25th and 26th. The current credit crisis has made it very difficult to cover CORR’s costs." He filed for bankruptcy and abandoned the sanctioning body's facilities in Chula Vista, California.

== Classes ==
There were ten classes in the series.

The eight truck classes were: Pro 4, Pro 2, Pro Spec, Pro Lite, and Trophy Kart (Junior I, Junior II, Modified).

The three buggy classes were: Pro Buggy, Single Buggy, and Light Buggy

=== Pro 4 ===
The trucks were built or manufactured as a full-size, four-wheel-drive type utility vehicle, capable of being driven through the front wheels. Vehicle must be a standard manufacturer production model available to the general public in the U.S. Vehicle style must have the manufacturer production of 5,000.

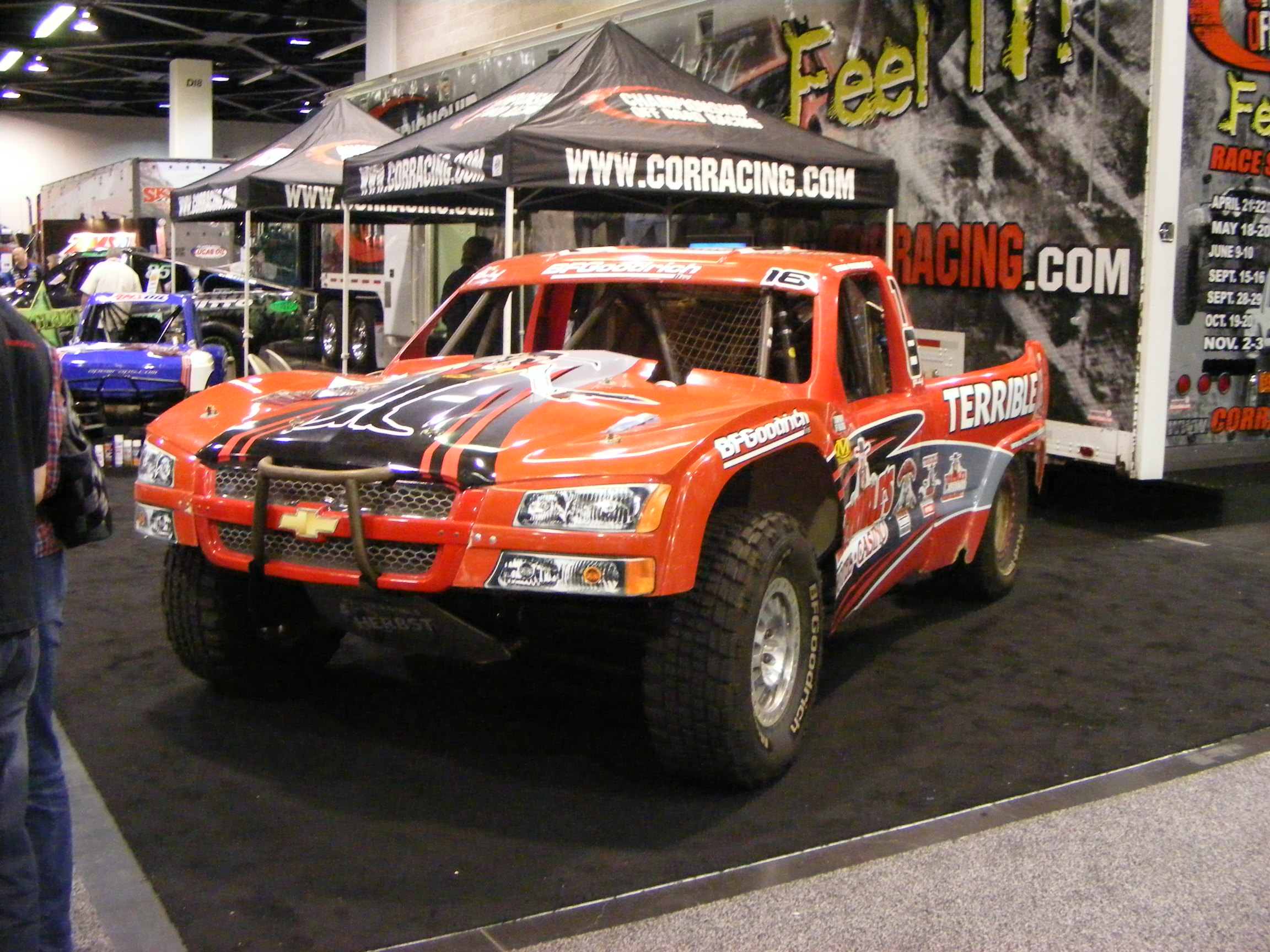
2008 Herbst Team Pro-4 Trophy Truck

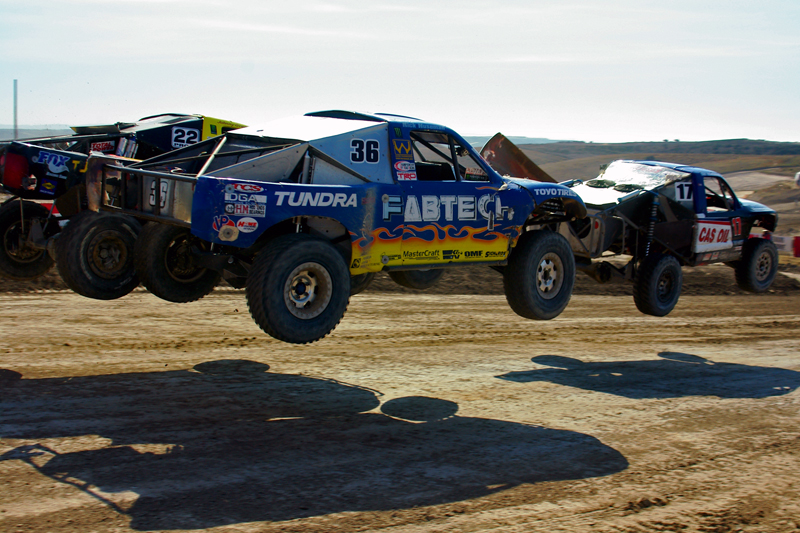
3 CORR Pro 4 trucks at Chula Vista in 2003

=== Past Champions ===
- 2008 Carl Renezeder
- 2007 Carl Renezeder
- 2006 Johnny Greaves
- 2005 Johnny Greaves
- 2004 Jason Baldwin
- 2003 Carl Renezeder
- 2002 Johnny Greaves
- 2001 Rob MacCachren
- 2000 Rob MacCachren
- 1999 Walker Evans
- 1998 Jack Flannery

=== Pro 2 ===
Specs: The trucks were built or manufactured as a full-size, two-wheel-drive type utility vehicle, weighing at least 3400 pounds. Vehicle must be a standard manufacturer production model available to the general public in the U.S. Vehicle style must have the manufacturer production of 5,000. Manufacturer body styles and engines must be from the same manufacturer. Horsepower: 8 cylinders, 750-900 HP. Suspension: Front wheel travel limit 18"; rear wheel travel limit 20". Chassis: Maximum wheelbase 120"; minimum wheelbase 113"; maximum track width 93". Body: Maximum body width 80". Weight: Minimum weight with driver 3,750 lb (1,700 kg); minimum front axle weight 48% of total truck weight. Tire Size: 35 x 12.50 maximum. Numbering: 1-99.

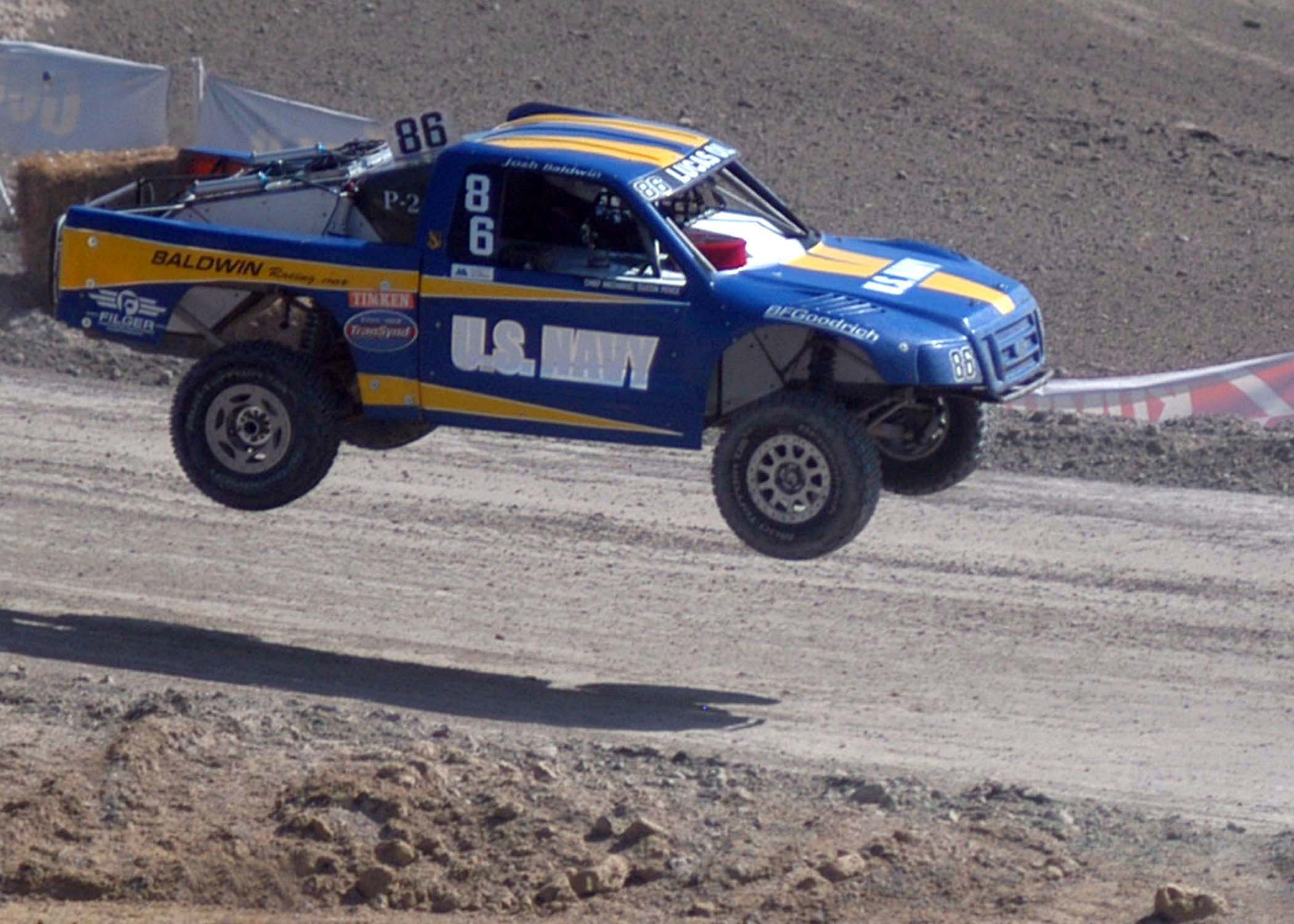
Josh Baldwin competes in the Pro-2 series during the 2005 Nissan Nationals at the Chula Vista International Raceway in Chula Vista, California.

==== Past Champions ====
- 2008 Rob MacCachren
- 2007 Jerry Whelchel
- 2006 Carl Renezeder
- 2005 Carl Renezeder
- 2004 Scott Taylor
- 2003 Scott Taylor
- 2002 Scott Taylor
- 2001 Scott Taylor
- 2000 Scott Taylor
- 1999 Scott Taylor
- 1998 Ricky Johnson

=== Pro-Lite ===
The trucks were compact trucks which have 250 horsepower (190 kW), must weight 2800 pounds, and can not have more than 12 inches (300 mm) of front and 14 inches (360 mm) of rear suspension travel. Vehicle style must have had a manufacturer production of 5,000.

=== Past Champions ===
- 2008 Marty Hart
- 2007 Rob Naughton
- 2006 Chad Hord
- 2005 Jeff Kincaid
- 2004 Kyle LeDuc
- 2003 Jeff Kincaid
- 2002 Jeff Kincaid
- 2001 Jeff Kincaid
- 2000 Jeff Kincaid
- 1999 Johnny Greaves
- 1998 Johnny Greaves

== Other notable drivers ==
- Jason Baldwin – late son of Jim Baldwin, was killed in a plane crash on November 19, 2005.
- Jim Baldwin
- Josh Baldwin – son of Jim Baldwin
- Scott Douglas
- Evan Evans
- Brendan Gaughan – the future NASCAR driver competed in the Pro-2 division in the 1997 Winter Series and 1998 season.
- Robby Gordon
- Rick Huseman
- Jimmie Johnson – the future seven-time Sprint Cup Series champion won the 1997 Winter Series Pro-2 championship at Glen Helen Raceway, CORR's first event after taking over from SODA.
- Jeremy McGrath
- Rod Millen
- Rodrigo Ampudia – Made history as being the first international driver to win a CORR race.
- Evie Baldwin aka Prettymuddy
- Cissy Baldwin
- Kelley Renezeder
- Rhonda Konitzer
- Travis Pastrana
- Carl Renezeder
- Art Schmitt
- Keith Steele

== Tracks ==
- Bark River International Raceway
- Chula Vista, California, in the "Otay Ranch" neighborhood (Baldwin's construction company built a temporary circuit)
- Crandon International Off-Road Raceway
- Heartland Park Topeka
- I-96 Speedway
- Langlade County Speedway
- Pomona Fairplex
- Las Vegas Motor Speedway
- Stafford Motor Speedway
- Route 66 Raceway
- Indiana State Fairgrounds
- Unadilla MX
- Texas Motor Speedway
- Antelope Valley Fairgrounds
- Trollhaugen
- Milan, Michigan
- Midwest Off-Road Raceway
- Luxemburg Speedway
