= Evan Evans (racing driver) =

American professional off-road racer

Evan Walker Evans (born February 11, 1965) is an American professional off-road racer. He raced in the Championship Off-Road Racing (CORR) series in the 1990s when he was the Pro 2 champion in CORR despite racing using hand controls since he is a paraplegic. He continues to race occasional races as of the end of the 2012 season. Evans is the son of off-road racing "The Legend" Walker Evans.

== Accident ==
On July 13, 1989, a motorcycle accident significantly changed Evans' life. He was thrown from a bike when he hit a ditch from a construction project near his home. He was paralyzed from the chest down. "When the doctors told me my spinal cord had been severed, it was my worst nightmare come true," says Evans. "But I decided then and there, I was not going to give up." He saw no reason why not being able to walk should stop him from doing what he loved.

"It doesn't matter if you're in a wheelchair or have healthy legs," Evans added. "If you have the will to do something, you can get it done. I race the same as anyone else does; I just don't use my feet. And, I never give up."

== Racing career ==
=== Early racing career ===
Having rehabilitated, Evans entered some desert races to develop his hand controls and hone his driving skills. He also competed in the Mickey Thompson Stadium Series, a now defunct indoor stadium short-course off-road racing series. In 1996, Evans built a Chevrolet C1500 truck, which he successfully campaigned in the popular Midwestern SODA (Short Course Off-Road Racing Association) Series.

Evans claimed seven class victories and one second-place finish, and won the 1996 Class 13 Championship title. The season put his name in the record books as the winningest truck class driver in SODA history. His domination of the series earned Evans the special recognition of becoming the first paraplegic racer to capture a professional off-road racing title.

Evans' first-season success in the SODA Series netted him the honors of being elected to the 1996 AARWBA Auto Racing All-America Team in the "At Large" category; and he also received the 1996 SODA "Driver of the Year" award. After winning five of the eight races in 1997, Evans finished the SODA season in second place in the Class 13 point standings.

=== Championship Off Road Racing ===
The SODA series was replaced by CORR (Championship Off-Road Racing) as the prominent off-road racing series in 1998. Evans competed in the Pro-2 (rear wheel drive trucks) division. He took one win and eight top-five finishes to post a sixth-place position in the final point standings.

In 1999, Evans took one win, nine top-five finishes to post fifth-place position, still adapting to the Pro-2 class.

In 2000, Evans raced the CORR Series and won seven races and placed second in the final points standings.

In 2001 in the CORR Series, Evans placed second in the final points standings, with five wins and 12 top-five Finishes.

In 2002 in the CORR Series, Evans won four races and placed second in the final points standings. He also set a record for the winningest driver at Bark River, Michigan track. Evan also set a fast track record for a Pro-2 at that track.

In 2003, Evans raced the CORR Series and won one race and had ten top-five finishes. He placed third in the final points standings. In the CORR Series, Evans set fast lap record overall (first time a 2-wheel drive truck's time has beat a 4-wheel drive's time) at Bark River. Evan also qualified for the pole position for the "Fabulous Five" in the Borg Warner at Crandon International Off-Road Raceway.

In 2004, Scott Taylor was leading Evans by 18 points going into the final two-race weekend. The track was wet and slippery on the Saturday race and Taylor finished fourth, two spots ahead of Evans. In the final round, Taylor finished in second place, one spot in front of Evans, to win his sixth consecutive Pro-2 CORR title. Evans had 11 top-five finishes and four wins. He is the first Pro-2 driver to get four consecutive wins.

Evans has raced occasionally since and the sanctioning bodies have changed several times. In 2012, he raced in five Lucas Oil Off Road Racing Series Pro 2 Unlimited events.

=== Desert racing ===
The last time Evans drove in the Baja 1000, he was only three days out of a hospital, where he had been told he was paralyzed from the chest down from a motorcycle accident. He was helped into a Jeep Cherokee specially prepared with hand controls by his father, Walker, so he could at least start the world's most famous off-road race.

Evans, then 24, drove the first 72 miles before turning the Jeep over to Brian Stewart, who finished the 1989 race. It was enough to assure Evans of the SCORE International (SCORE)/High Desert Racing Assn. championship in Class 6, one for production sedans. Evans was voted SCORE's off-roadsman of the year, the highest award in the sport, one his father had won in 1983.

=== Hill Climb ===
In 2000, Evans earned the opportunity from Chevrolet to race a Duramax Diesel up Pikes Peak International Hill Climb. He was the only truck in his class (High Performance Show Room Stock) racing against Porsches and Toyota cars. Evans placed fourth in his class and set a record for fastest diesel vehicle ever up the Pikes Peak. Evan was named "Rookie of the Year" and also was awarded the Ralph Bruning "NEVER GIVE UP" Award.

== GM Mobility Program ==
Evans also joined Chevrolet as a spokesperson for the GM Mobility Program for Persons with Disabilities, and became a member of the Chevy Thunder off-road motor sports team. "Winning the (Class 13) title, joining Chevrolet, and becoming associated with the GM Mobility Program were like a dream come true for me," said Evans.
