= Short-course Off-road Drivers Association =

Short-Course Off-road Drivers Association
- Sport: Short course off-road racing
- Jurisdiction: Midwestern United States
- Abbreviation: SODA
- Founded: 1970s
- CEO: Jeff Conway
- Closure date: circa 1997

The Short-course Off-road Drivers Association (usually abbreviated as SODA) was a short course off-road racing sanctioning body in the United States.

== History ==
SODA began as a Midwestern United States off-road racing series in the early 1970s. Most races were held in Wisconsin but a few were held in Michigan. The crown jewel of the series was the off-road championship event held at the Crandon International Off-Road Raceway - the "home of the world championship off-road race".

The vehicles used were primarily trophy trucks, buggies (which were based on the original Volkswagen Beetle called Baja Bugs), pickup trucks, and a few stock cars. All vehicles had heavily modified suspensions.

Most drivers from SODA moved to CORR (Championship Off-Road Racing) after the 1997 season, which basically ended SODA's existence. A greatly diminished series continued on for at least a few years afterwards.

== Classes ==
- Class 1-1600, 1600 cc engine buggies with driver only
- Class 2-1600, 1600 cc engine buggies with driver plus co-pilot (Sometimes run with class 1-1600)
- Class 3, 4-wheel-drive short wheelbase vehicles (Jeep CJ, Ford Bronco, etc.)
- Class 4, 4-wheel-drive full-size trucks
- Class 5-1600, buggies with driver only
- Class 6 modified passenger cars, and later 2wd SUVs
- Class 7s, 2-wheel-drive four-cylinder trucks
- Class 8, 2-wheel-drive full-size trucks
- Class 8s 2-wheel-drive full-size trucks (nearly stock vehicles, with restrictor plate V8 engines)
- Class 9, modified buggies with up to 1914 cc air-cooled engines, or 1600 cc engines water-cooled
- Class 10, Class 9 with co-pilot
- Class 11, stock 1600 cc engine buggies with driver only
- Class 12, stock 1600 cc engine buggies with driver plus co-pilot (sometimes run with Class 11)
- Class 13, 2-wheel-drive full-sized trucks with more restrictions than Class 8
- Heavy Metal, combined race with Class 3, Class 4 and Class 8 trucks
- SODA Light, small single-seat short-wheelbase buggies with small CC snowmobile engines

== Television ==
The series was televised in starting with Crandon's race in 1989 on ESPN. Series races appeared tape delayed on ESPN/ESPN2 (often during the winter months). ESPN covered the two trophy truck classes (4 and 8) along with 7S. ESPN2 started covering races in 1995. It covered Classes 13, 9/10, and 1600. The ESPN2 races featured Marty Reid as the lead announcer, Ivan Stewart as color commentator, and Jimmie Johnson as pit reporter. In late 1996, SODA sanctioned the Chevrolet Off-Road Winter Series; drivers traveled across the country in the Glen Helen Raceway in California.

== Video game ==
In 1997, Sierra Entertainment released a SODA-themed racing video game called SODA Off-Road Racing!.

== Tracks that held races ==
Many Wisconsin and Michigan tracks held races, including:

- Bark River Off-road Raceway, Bark River, Michigan
- Crandon International Off-Road Raceway, Crandon, Wisconsin
- Ionia Fairgrounds Speedway, Ionia, Michigan
- I-96 Speedway, Lake Odessa, Michigan
- Langlade County Speedway, Antigo, Wisconsin
- Lake Geneva Raceway, Lake Geneva, Wisconsin
- Luxemburg Speedway, Luxemburg, Wisconsin
- Milan Dragway, Milan, Michigan
- RedBud MX, Buchanan, Michigan
- Road America, Elkhart Lake, Wisconsin
- Sunnyview Expo Center, Oshkosh, Wisconsin
- Memorial Total Off-Road Rally, Dresser, Wisconsin

== Drivers ==
- Scott Douglas
- Evan Evans, 1996 Class 13 Champion
- Walker Evans - 1994 and 1995 Class 4 champion
- Jack Flannery, 7-time series champion
- Brendan Gaughan - 1995 Class 13 champion, 1996 Class 8 champion
- Johnny Greaves
- Chad Hord
- Jimmie Johnson
- Jeff Kincaid
- Curt LeDuc
- Rob MacCachren, 1995 Class 4 champion
- Scott Taylor
