= C. J. Greaves =

American racing driver

C.J. Greaves
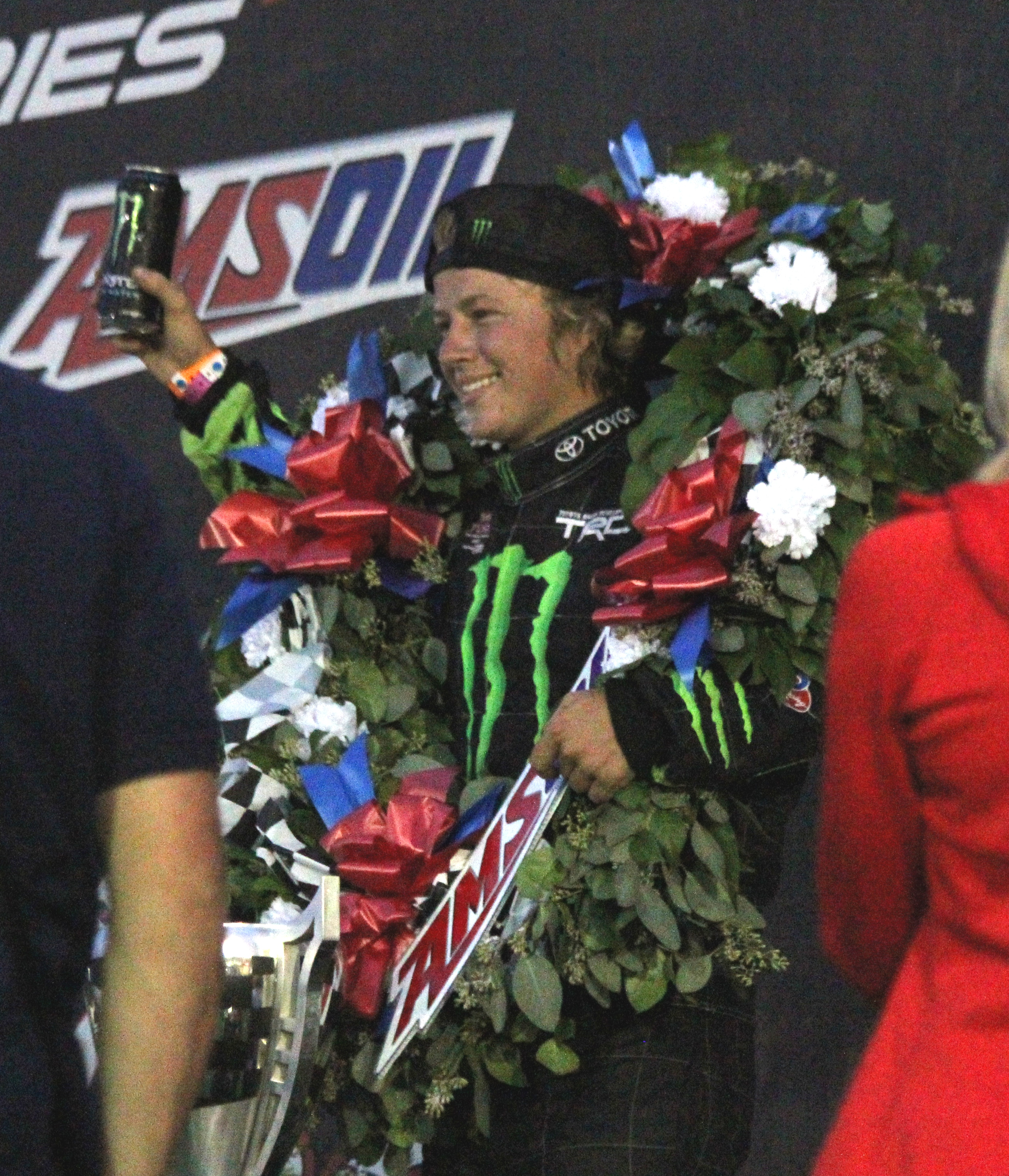
- Greaves celebrating his 2013 AMSOIL Cup win
- Nationality: American
- Born: June 1, 1995 (age 31) Abrams, Wisconsin
- Relatives: Johnny Greaves

Pro 4 career
- Debut season: 2014
- Current team: Johnny G Motorsports
- Car number: 33
- Championships: 2015, 2016, 2017, 2018, 2019
- Wins: 33
- Best finish: 1st in 2015, 2016, 2017, 2018, 2019
- Finished last season: 1st

Championship titles
- 2010, 2011 TORC Super Buggy; 2014, 2015, 2016 TORC Pro 2; 2015, 2016, 2017 TORC Pro 4; 2017 TORC Pro Stock UTV; 2019 Lucas Oil Midwest Short Course League Pro Stock UTV; 2018, 2019 Lucas Oil Midwest Short Course League Pro 4

Awards
- 2013, 2015, 2018, 2022: AMSOIL Cup
- Statistics up to date as of October 29, 2014.

Colton "C.J." Greaves (born June 1, 1995) is a professional American off-road racing driver from Abrams, Wisconsin. He raced in the TORC: The Off Road Championship Super Buggy and Pro Light divisions, winning the 2010 Super Buggy championship. He now races in the Pro Stock UTV division and the Pro 4 division, in which he competes against his father, seven-time Pro 4 champion Johnny Greaves. Greaves won the 2013 AMSOIL Cup world championship race in his Pro 2 truck. He won the 2014 Pro 2 championship and made his first Pro 4 start that season. Greaves won both the Pro 4WD and Pro 2WD class championships in 2015 and 2016 and also won the Pro 4 Championship in 2017, 2018, and 2019. Greaves has also won Pro Stock UTV Championships in 2017 and 2019. Greaves is the son and teammate of Johnny Greaves.

== Background ==
Greaves grew up in a racing household. His father Johnny Greaves who started in buggies and rose up through the ranks, eventually racing in the premier 4-wheel-drive Pro 4 trophy trucks. To focus on his racing career, C. J. did not attend a physical high school and instead took online classes.

== Racing career ==
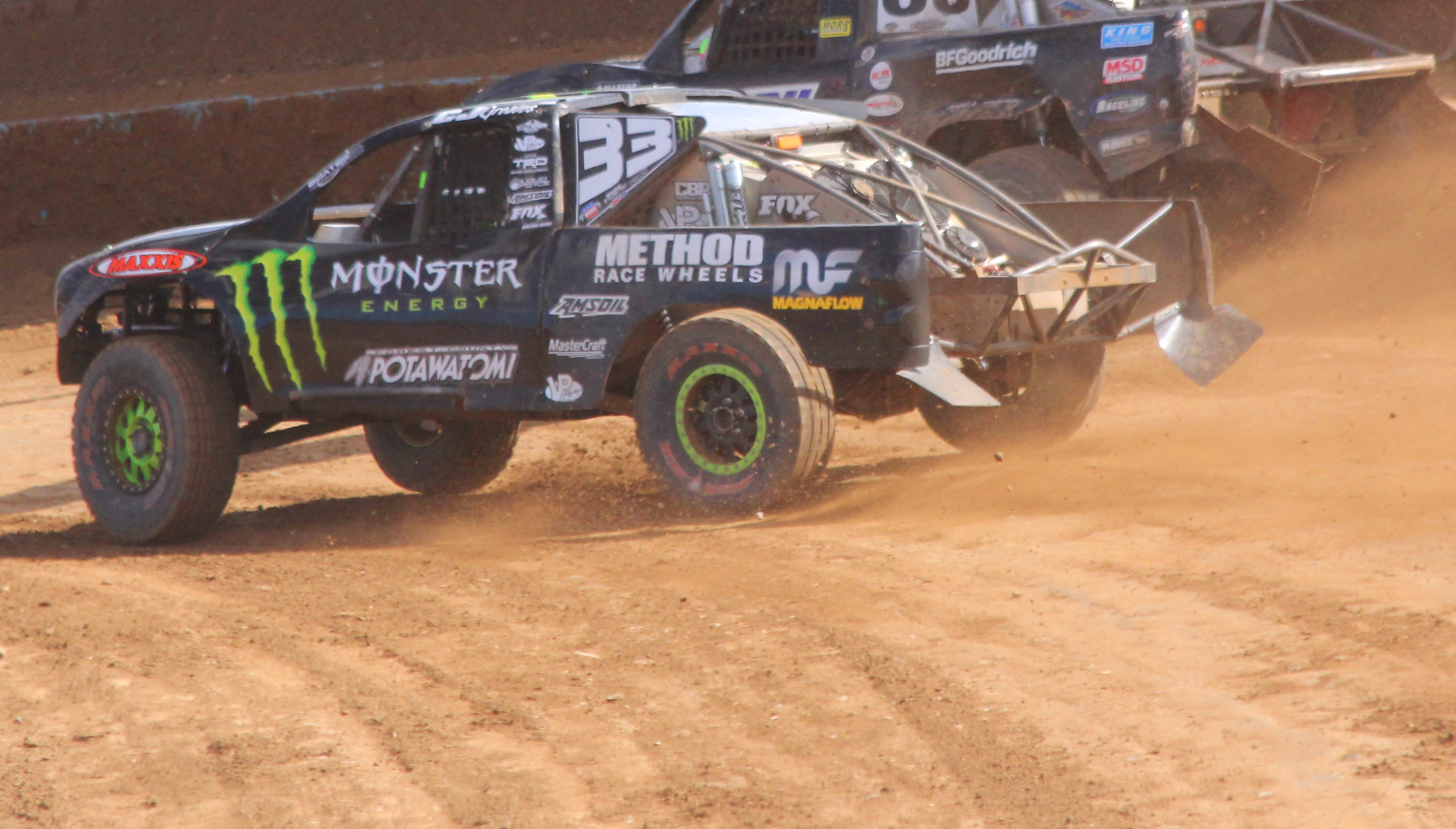
Greaves' 2013 Pro 2 truck at Crandon International Off-Road Raceway

Greaves began racing in off-road short course buggies. He won the 2010 Super Buggy class championship. He continued racing Super Buggy and started Pro Light in 2011. Greaves finished second at Antigo's Saturday buggy race and won the Sunday race for first win of the season. He finished sixth in Pro Light points. Greaves finished the Super Buggy season with two wins at the Oshkosh to win his second consecutive Super Buggy championship.

Greaves continued racing Pro Light in 2012 and began racing a Pro 2 trophy truck full-time. He started from the pole position for the season's first Pro Light race at the Charlotte Motor Speedway dirt track and he finished on the podium in third. He raced in his second Pro 2 race that day hoping to get accustomed to the truck. Greaves ended up winning the race to become the youngest Pro 2 winner in history. He had a third place holeshot and held the position until the competition caution. He passed Jeff Kincaid after the restart and passed for the win after Bryce Menzies spun out. "I was very proud and excited to see CJ get that win," said Johnny Greaves after the win. "We were really not sure how he would feel in the truck since it was only his second time in the seat. He is really able to feel the tire hook-up and communicate what the truck is doing to Brad and me. CJ knows it's just the first race, but it's just very exciting." Greaves followed up the win with a third-place finish on next day's race at Charlotte.

Greaves began the 2013 season by setting the fastest time and winning the Pro Lite race at the Saturday Dodge City Raceway Park race. After not recording a qualifying time in Pro 2, he raced from the back of the field to finish third in Saturday Pro 2 race. Greaves finished third in the 2013 Pro 2 points with five fastest laps. In Pro Light, he had the fastest lap eight times to finish second in the championship. In the 2013 AMSOIL Cup race at Crandon, Greaves started with the Pro 2 trucks ahead of the Pro 4 trucks. Greaves battled his father Johnny (in his Pro 4 truck) for the final four laps, well ahead of third-place Chad Hord. The Greaves father-and-son duo went side by side across the finish line and C.J. claimed the victory over Johnny.

In 2014, he began the season racing in Pro Lite and Pro 2. In Pro Lite, he won the World Championship race at the Crandon Labor Day race weekend and finished third in season points. In the higher ranking Pro 2 class, he won the season championship over Chad Hord, Jeff Kincaid, Steve Barlow, and Jarit Johnson. He also made his first start in the highest ranking Pro 4 class and finished ninth in the season points. That class was topped by his third-place finish at the final race at Crandon. The following year, he competed at X Games Austin 2015, driving in the Stadium Super Trucks category. After finishing third in his heat race, he went on to win the Last Chance Qualifier to advance to the final; he finished fourth.

In his short career, Greaves has become one of the winningest drivers in short course off-road history, with 33 wins and 5 championships in the Pro 4 class, 29 wins and 3 championships in the Pro 2 class, 11 wins in Pro Lights, 12 wins and 2 championships in Pro Buggy, 25 wins and 2 championships in Pro Stock UTV, and one win in Pro Mod UTV. He has also won three Red Bull World Cup races at Crandon International Off-Road Raceway, tied with Scott Douglas and Rob MacCachren for most in the race's history. Greaves is also the only driver to win that race in both a Pro 2wd truck (2013, 2018) and a Pro 4x4 truck (2015).
