= SODA Off-Road Racing =

1997 video game

- Developer: Software Allies
- Publisher: Sierra Entertainment
- Platform: Windows
- Release: NA: October 29, 1997
- Genre: Racing
- Modes: Single-player, multiplayer

SODA Off-Road Racing is an off-road racing simulation video game for Windows published in 1997 by Sierra Entertainment. The game is based on the SODA series, but includes only fantasy vehicles and tracks. It was developed by Software Allies, a collaboration of companies that included Papyrus.

== Reception ==
Reception

Aggregate score
Aggregator	Score
GameRankings	66%

Review scores
Publication	Score
AllGame	2/5
Computer Games Strategy Plus	3/5
Computer Gaming World	4.5/5
Game Informer	5.5/10
GameRevolution	C−
GameSpot	7.7/10
PC Gamer (US)	67%

The game received "average" reviews according to the review aggregation website GameRankings. GameSpot said, "SODA Off-Road Racing is a great title marred only by poor graphics and uninspired sound."
