= Johnny Greaves (racing driver) =

American racing driver

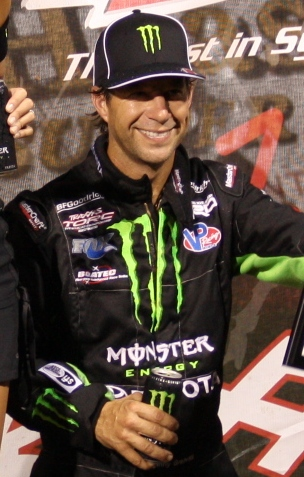
- Greaves after a podium finish in 2010
- Nationality: American
- Born: March 21, 1966 (age 60) Abrams, Wisconsin, U.S.
- Relatives: C. J. Greaves

Pro 4 career
- Debut season: 2001
- Current team: Johnny G Motorsports
- Car number: 22
- Championships: 7
- Wins: 100 (as of August 1, 2021)
- Best finish: 1st in 2002, 2005, 2006, 2007, 2010, 2013, 2014
- Finished last season: 2nd

Previous series
- SODA, CORR, WSORR, TORC

Championship titles
- SODA Class 1-1600 and Class 9 buggies(1992); SODA Class 7s (Pro Light) (1994, 1995, 1996, 1997); CORR Pro-Light (1998, 1998 Winter Heat); CORR Pro 4 (2002, 2005, 2006); WSORR 4x4 (2007); TORC Pro 4x4 (2010, 2013, 2014)

Awards
- (2004, 2007) (2003, 2006, 2013, 2015, 2017, 2018): Red Bull Crandon World Cup Crandon Chairman’s Cup Challenge
- Statistics up to date as of October 12, 2013.

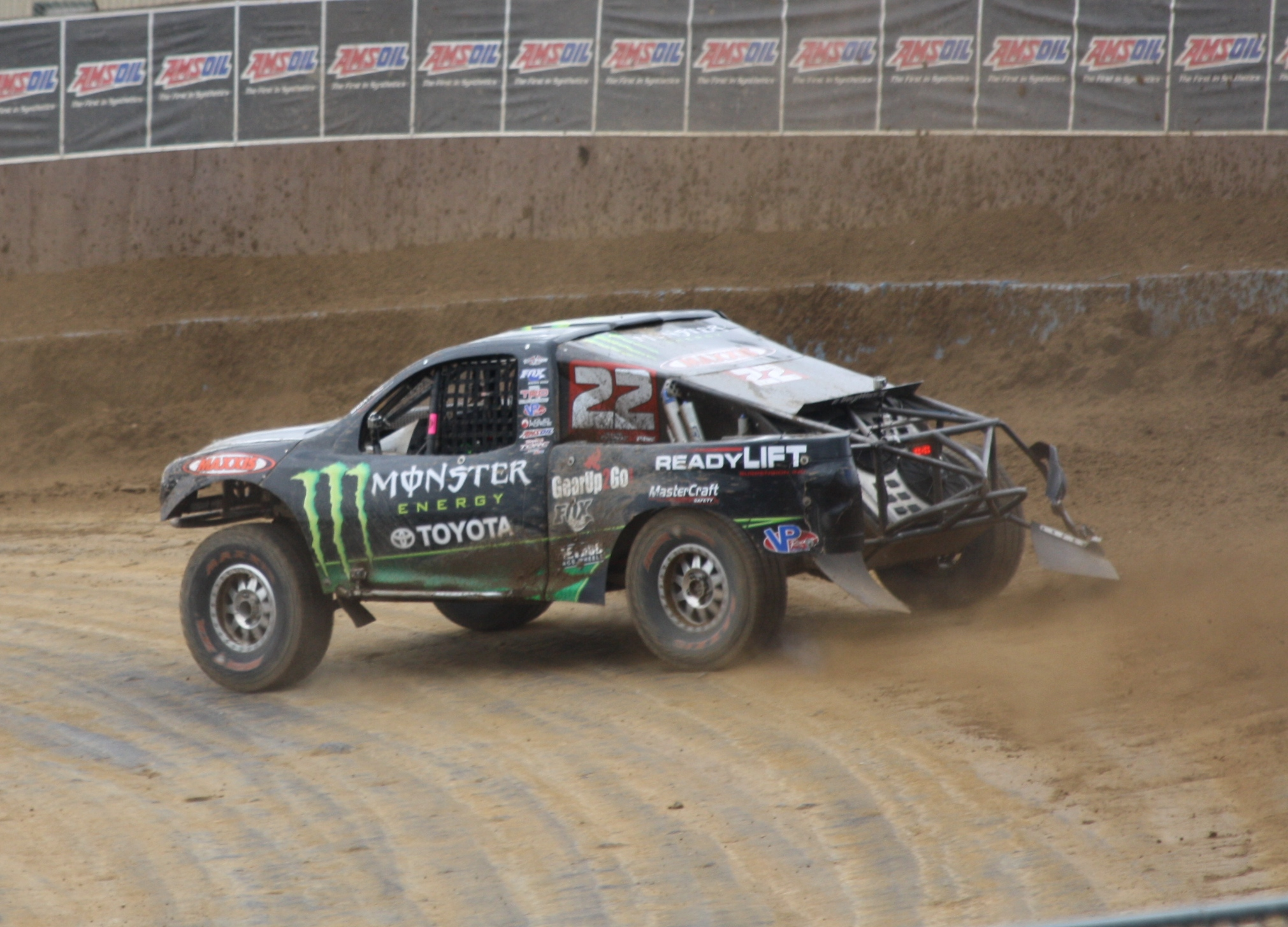
2011 Pro 4 truck

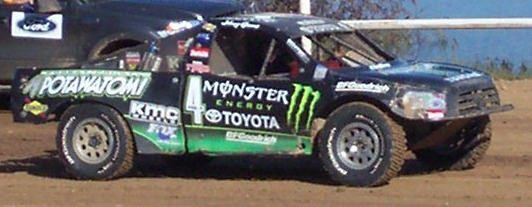
Greaves at the Borg-Warner in Crandon in 2008

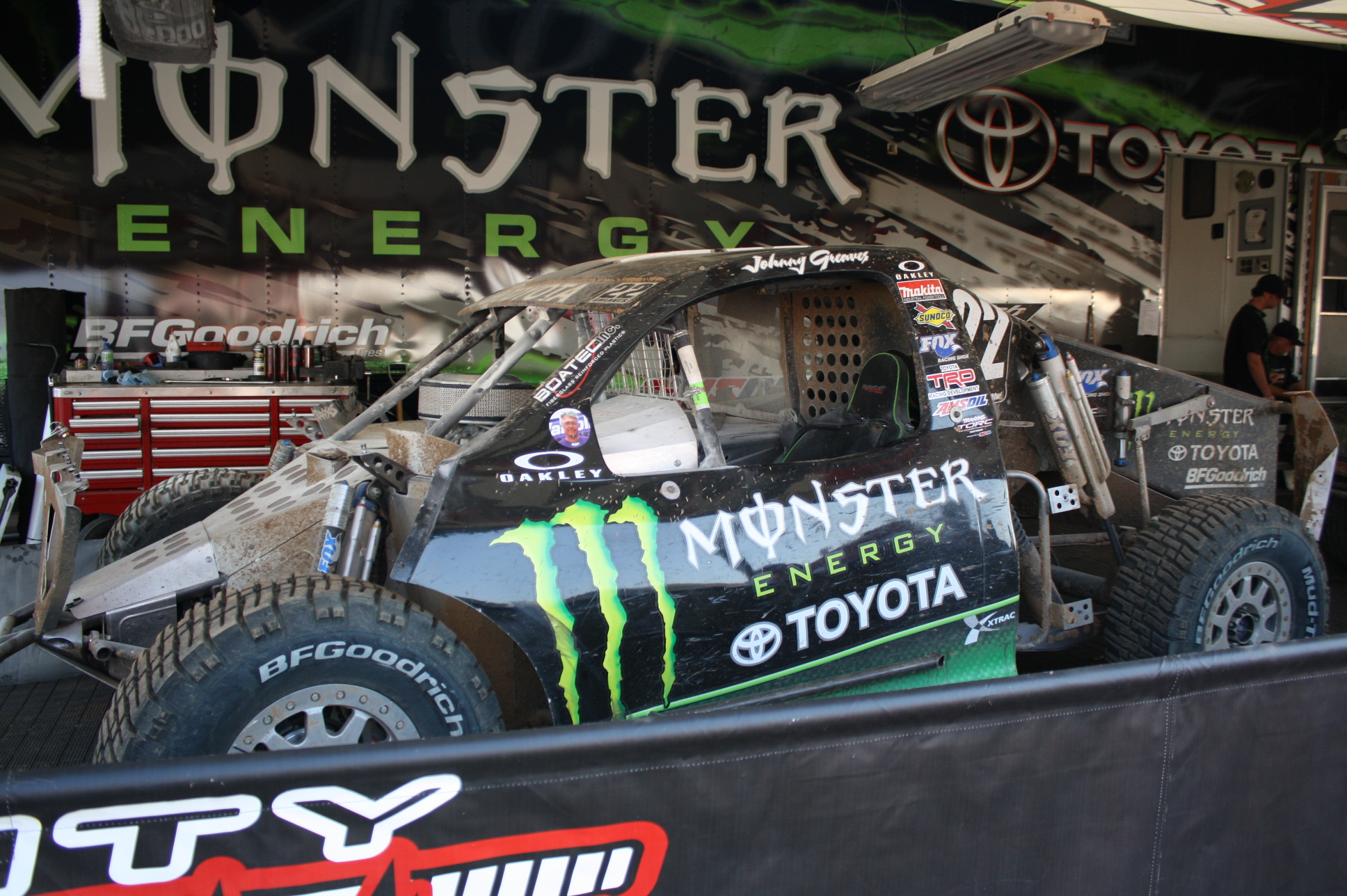
Greaves' Truck at the 2009 Borg-Warner

Johnny Greaves (born March 21, 1966) is a professional American off-road racing racetruck driver from Abrams, Wisconsin. He has competed in numerous major off-road series, including SCORE International, Short-course Off-road Drivers Association (SODA), Championship Off-Road Racing (CORR), World Series of Off-Road Racing (WSORR), and Traxxas TORC Series (TORC).

Greaves began racing in buggies and won two championships before to Pro Light. He won seven Pro Light championship between SODA and its successor CORR. He raced one year in a Pro 2 Trophy Truck before moving into Pro 4, the premiere class in short-course off-road racing. Greaves won class championships in CORR in 2004 and 2006 as well as WSORR in 2007. After those sanctioning bodies dissolved, he won the 2010 Traxxas TORC Series champion in their Pro 4x4 division. He continued racing in the Pro 4 division, winning the 2013 title.

== Racing career ==
=== Early career ===
Greaves began racing in motocross at age 12. He switched to racing four wheel vehicles at age 23. He raced in buggies in SCORE International and SODA. He won multiple buggy-class championships, including SODA's "double" titles in Class 1-1600 and Class 9 in 1992. He also raced a few light production trucks that season in Class 7s.

=== Light production trucks (1993–1999) ===
He went full-time in Class 7s in 1993, and won the final two events. He started a relationship with Toyota trucks that remains today. He returned to the class in 1994, and won the championship. He received national television exposure, as SODA events were broadcast on ESPN and ESPN2. SODA's regular season was held primarily on tracks in Wisconsin. SODA sanctioned a separate Winter Heat series in California, and Greaves won the Winter Heat class 7S championships in 1995 and 1996. We won 70 percent the races that he entered in 1994 to 1996. SODA's regular season in summer of 1997 was the final season for the sanctioning body before CORR took over sanctioning the off-road vehicles in the winter of 1998. Greaves joined with rival Jeff Kincaid to form a two truck Toyota team in 1997. Greaves/Kincaid Motorsports won 19 out of 20 races between the 1997 SODA Series and 1998 CORR Winter Series. Greaves captured the class championship, and Kincaid took second. CORR named the class Pro-Lite, and Greaves' domination continued. In 1998, Greaves captured the checkered flag in 10 of 16 races in 1998. Greaves won 11 events in 1999, and captured his third Pro-Lite championship.

=== Pro-2 (2000) ===
Greaves moved up to the full-size trucks in 2000. He joined the Pro-2 class of two wheel drive trucks in a Toyota Tundra. He won the final event at Topeka, Kansas. He was the highest Pro-2 finisher at the Borg-Warner Cup race at the Crandon International Off-Road Raceway.

=== Pro-4 (2001–present) ===
He moved up the four wheel drive Pro-4 class in 2001. The series is the premiere division in the short course off-road series. He had three victories in his rookie season. He finished third in the points standings. He became the first driver to win a race in all three divisions in CORR. Greaves won three races and the series championship in 2002. Greaves finished fourth in the 2003 championship. He won four events that year, including the Potawatomi Governor’s Cup which was sponsored by his long-time sponsor Forest County Potawatomi Bingo. Greaves won four races in 2004, including the $100,000 Borg-Warner Cup at Crandon. He finished fifth in the 2004 championship points. Greaves started slow in the 2005, but finished the season by winning seven consecutive races. He won CORR's Precision Gear 2005 Driver of the Year award. Greaves had a big crash at Crandon in September 2006, but he recovered rapidly. He earned eight victories in 2006, won the season championship, and was named driver of the year. He set the record for the most consecutive wins in CORR history when he won seven races. Greaves entered his first Baja 1000 in November 2006. In 2007 he competed in both the Pro-4 division in CORR and the 4x4 division in WSORR (World Series of Off-Road Racing). He won his second BorgWarner Shootout (now part of the WSORR championship), the world championship event at Crandon. Greaves won the WSORR championship after winning six events. He finished sixth in CORR after winning the first and third rounds.

After CORR and WSORR both ended after the 2008 season, he continued off-road racing in the Traxxas TORC Series starting in 2009. Greaves set a world record in 2009 when he jumped 301 feet (92 m) in a 3,100 pounds (1,400 kg) TORC Pro 2WD truck. The truck hit the ramp at 105.5 miles per hour (169.8 km/h) with its 800 horsepower NASCAR Camping World Truck Series engine. He won the 2010 Pro 4x4 championship.

In 2011, Greaves set the record for the fastest ever Pro 4 lap at Crandon. He overpowered Rick Huseman's 1:18.983 lap to establish a new record of 1:19.482 at the June Brush Run weekend. Greaves battled Ricky Johnson for the TORC championship all season. The duo battled for the lead in the opening laps for the final race at Texas. Greaves' truck broke in the final laps of the race and Johnson won the race along with the championship.

Greaves beat Rob MacCachren for the 2013 TORC championship by 20 points. One of Greaves highlights in the season was battling his son C. J.'s Pro 2 for the 2013 AMSOIL Cup. After the Pro 4 trucks started behind the Pro 2 field, Greaves passed all of the Pro 2 trucks except his son's. The two battled against each other for the final four laps. They pulled side by side coming out of the final corner and jumped across the line in a photo finish won by C.J.

Greaves won his 100th Pro 4 race on August 1, 2021 at the Dirt City Motorplex.

== Career totals ==
Greaves has more than 53 victories, which was the most in CORR's history.

- 1998, 1999 CORR Pro Lite champion
- 2002, 2005, 2006 CORR Pro 4 champion.
- 2007 WSORR Pro 4x4 champion.
- 2010, 2013, 2014 TORC Pro 4x4 champion.

== Personal life ==
Greaves' son C. J. Greaves began racing in buggies as a teenager and rapidly rose up the ranks to Pro 2 by 2012.
