= Short course off-road racing =

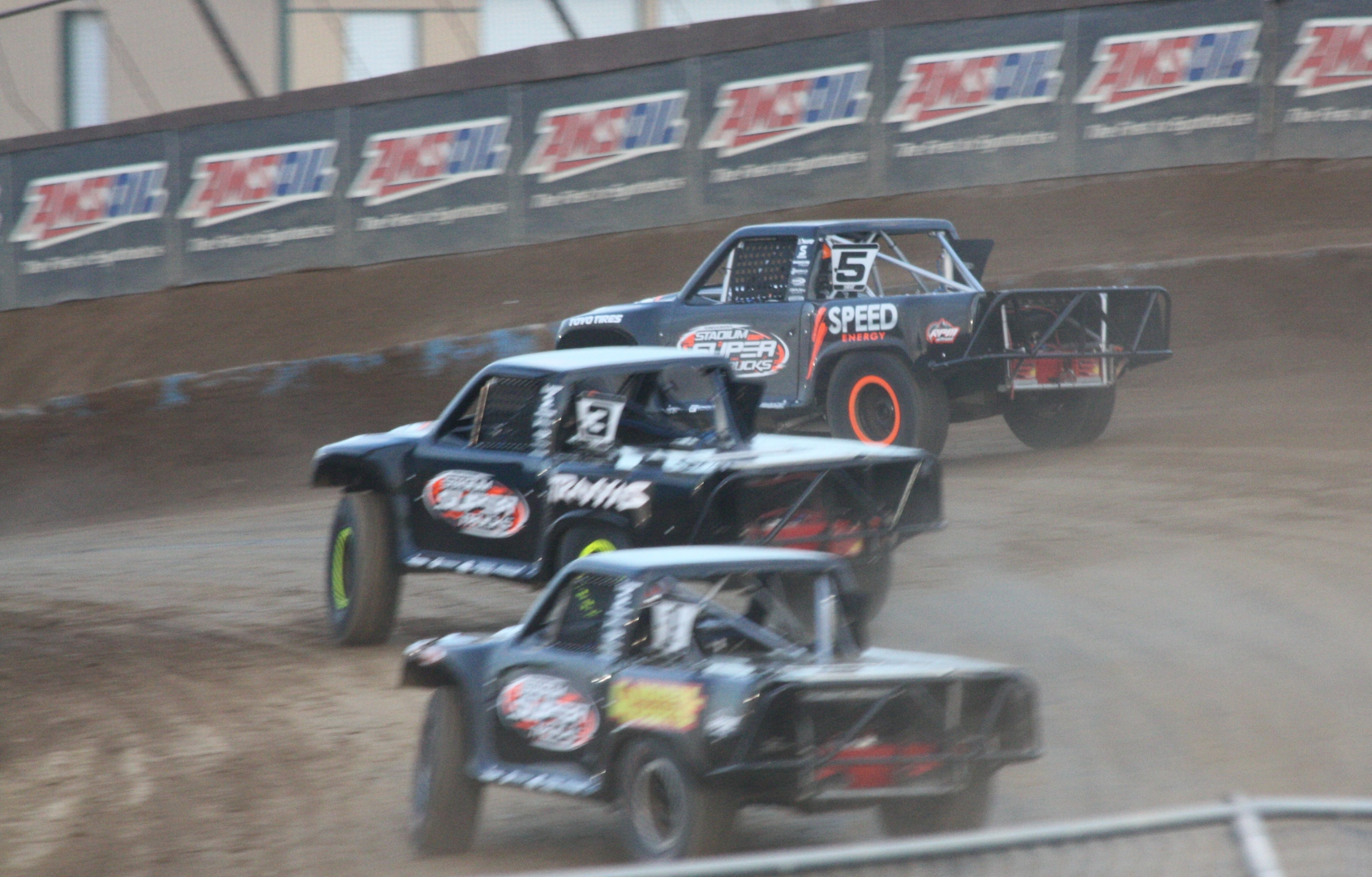
Stadium Super Trucks demonstration at Crandon International Off-Road Raceway in September 2012

Short course off-road racing is a form of auto racing involving the racing of modified vehicles on a dirt road closed course of a short length (tens of kilometers / miles or less). It is distinct from long course desert racing such as the Baja 1000, which consists of racing at least hundreds of kilometers / miles over a quasi linear (non-closed) course from one point to another.

== History ==
Short course off-road racing became popular during the 1970s, when Mickey Thompson founded the SCORE series. He shortened long course desert racing, condensing it to a short course for easier spectator viewing and to allow competitors much easier access to the pits for mechanical problems. Thompson developed the idea into a separate series as MTEG and concentrated on stadiums / arenas. At around the same time, outdoor road course racing developed in the Midwestern United States from two laps around a 50-mile course in the woods near Crandon, Wisconsin to its purpose-built track. SODA became the sanctioning body in this region; much of SODA's success was tied to the increasing support of manufacturers and it became the predominant short course series after Thompson's death. SODA fell out of favor with the creation of Championship Off Road Racing (CORR) in 1997 by announcer Marty Reid, though CORR folded in 2008 due to bankruptcy.

Differences in rules and regulations resulted in a schism between the West Coast and Midwestern United States, though series like CORR hoped to bridge the gap by racing in the other region. Both sides grew leagues of their own with the West Coast-based Lucas Oil Off Road Racing Series and Midwestern TORC: The Off-Road Championship both debuting in 2009, the latter replacing the World Series of Off-Road Racing which had also gone defunct the previous year. LOORRS and TORC thrived with financial support from Lucas Oil and strong drivers, respectively, for over a decade. However, financial troubles and the loss of title sponsor Amsoil caused TORC to shut down after 2017, while the COVID-19 pandemic led to LOORRS being folded in 2020.

Thompson's concept of stadium racing was revived by former MTEG racer Robby Gordon and his Stadium Super Trucks in 2013. However, after the 2013 season, the series began racing predominantly on street circuits, though it has occasionally returned to off-road courses and stadiums such as the Charlotte Motor Speedway dirt track and Lake Elsinore Diamond.

In 2020, the Midwest's Championship Off-Road began its inaugural season. A Western series, Great American Shortcourse, was founded a year later by LOORRS executive Lee Perfect and King of the Hammers organizer Dave Cole.

== Concept ==
There are two forms of short course off-road racing. One type involves the race vehicles on an outdoor dirt road course. The short course off-road racing world championships are held at Crandon International Off-Road Raceway.

Another type is stadium racing, where the vehicles race a much shorter course inside an arena. The Mickey Thompson Entertainment Group previously used the concept followed by the Stadium Super Trucks.
