= Amsoil =

American sythetic lubrication company

AMSOIL INC.
- Type: Private
- Industry: Oil and chemical
- Genre: Automotive service
- Founded: May 23, 1969; 57 years ago (as Life-Lube, Inc.)
- Founder: Albert J. Amatuzio
- Headquarters: Superior, Wisconsin, U.S.
- Area served: Worldwide
- Key people: Alan Amatuzio (Chairman & CEO), Bhadresh Sutaria (President)
- Products: Synthetic lubricants, synthetic grease, oil filters, nutritional products
- Owner: Alan Amatuzio
- Number of employees: 315
- Divisions: ALTRUM - Health Division
- Website: www.amsoil.com

AMSOIL Inc. is an American corporation based in Superior, Wisconsin that primarily formulates and packages synthetic lubricants, fuel additives, and filters. Company founder Albert J. Amatuzio developed several synthetic motor oil formulations throughout the mid-to-late 1960s. He was commercially selling synthetic motor oil by 1968. In 1972, AMSOIL 10W-40 Synthetic Motor Oil became the world's first synthetic motor oil to meet American Petroleum Institute requirements, which prompted the company to adopt "The First in Synthetics" as its tagline. The company introduced several other synthetic lubricants that represented industry firsts throughout the 1970s and early 1980s. It distributes products in North America via a network of independent dealers paid commissions on sales.

== History ==
Albert J. Amatuzio founded AMSOIL Inc. while serving as Squadron Commander of the Duluth, Minn. Air National Guard. Amatuzio was born May 6, 1924, to Italian immigrants in Duluth, Minn. Following high school in 1942, he attended Naval Air Corps training before the Navy closed the program. Amatuzio joined the Merchant Marine prior to joining the Air Force after World War II. He flew the F80 Shooting Star, America's first operational jet fighter. He returned to Duluth to run the family business after his mother had taken ill. In Duluth, Amatuzio joined the Air National Guard. During his fighter-pilot career, Amatuzio won the William Tell Air-to-Air Shootout Competition and the Earl T. Rick Competitive Shootout.

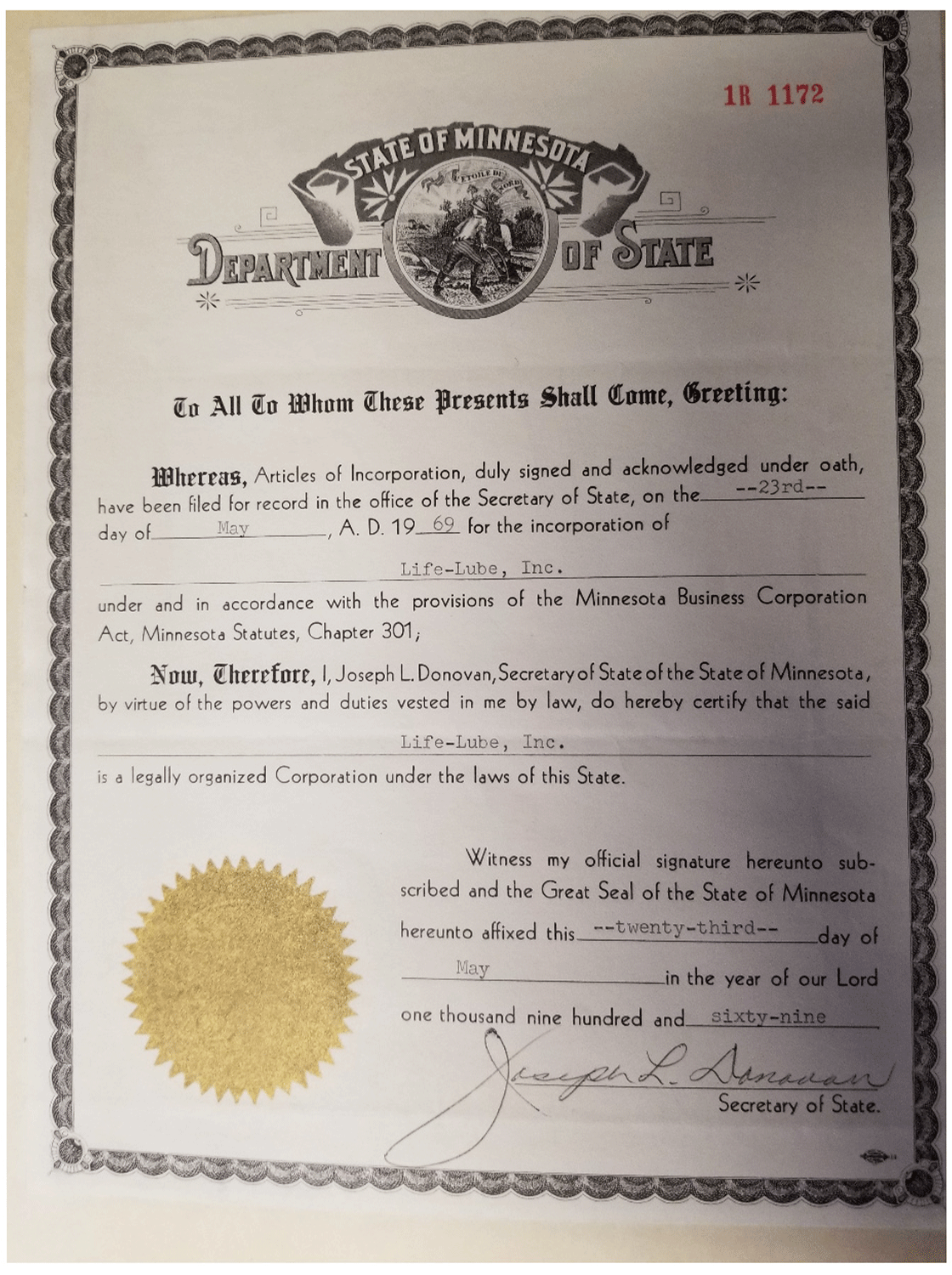
Life-Lube, Inc. certificate of incorporation from the Minnesota Department of State.

=== Life-Lube, Inc. ===
During his time as a pilot, Amatuzio began researching synthetic engine oils. Synthetic lubricants were used exclusively in jet engines due to the increased heat and stress of supersonic flight, and Amatuzio sought to apply the benefits of synthetic oil to automotive engines. He developed several different synthetic motor oil formulations and was commercially selling synthetic motor oil for automotive use by 1968. On May 23, 1969, he incorporated "Life-Lube, Inc.," through the Minnesota Department of State. By 1970, Amatuzio had renamed his company "AMZOIL," which he later changed to "AMSOIL."

=== API certification and network marketing ===
AMSOIL 10W-40 Synthetic Motor Oil became the first synthetic motor oil in the world to meet American Petroleum Institute (API) service requirements in 1972. The company created its tagline, "The First in Synthetics®," to acknowledge the achievement.

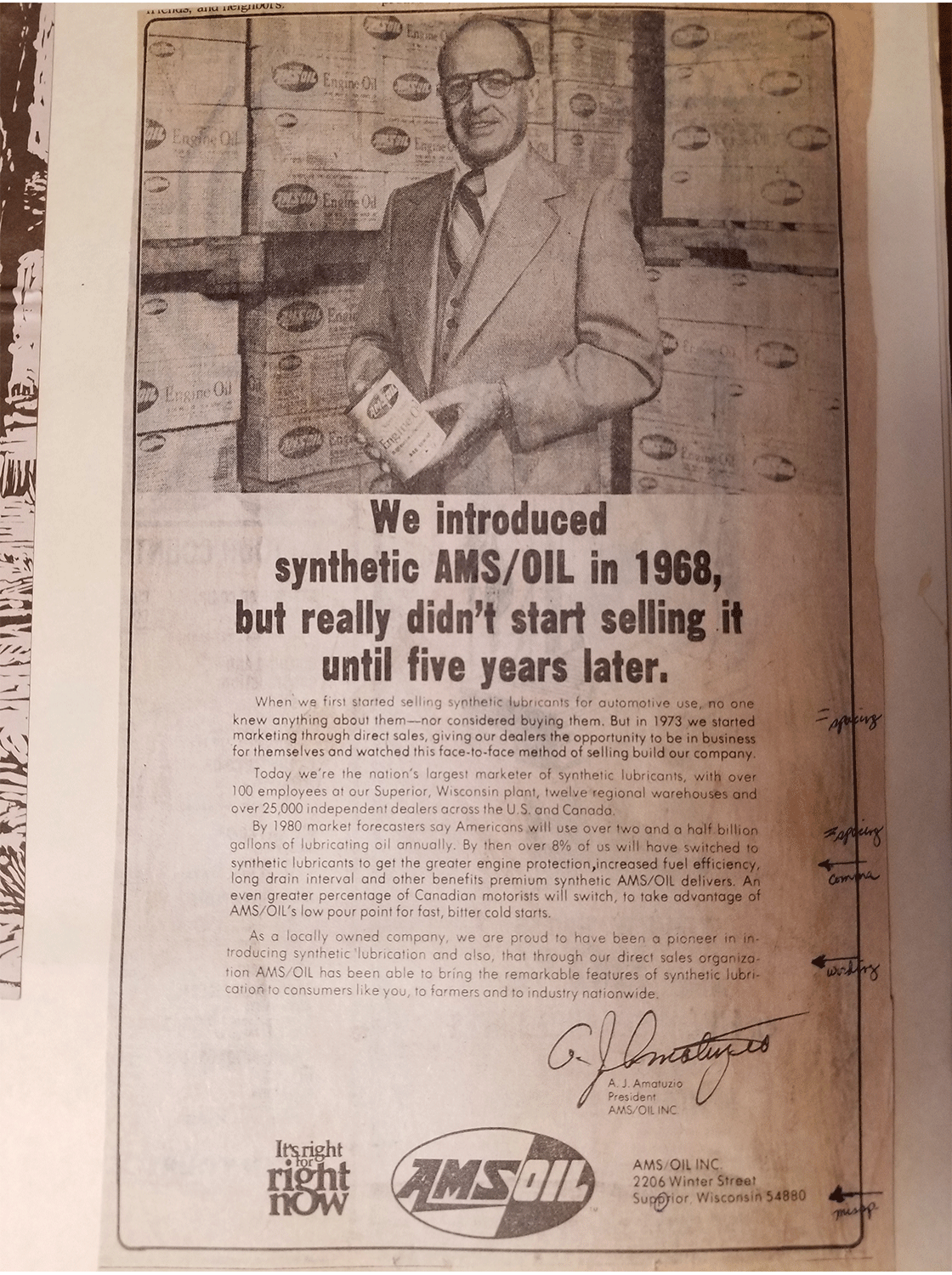
Newspaper ad showing that AMSOIL synthetic motor was commercially available by 1968.

Due to widespread unawareness of synthetic motor oil and consequent slow sales, Amatuzio started the North American AMSOIL Dealer network in 1973. Using network marketing instead of traditional retail sales, AMSOIL Dealers were able to communicate the product's benefits compared to conventional motor oil directly to motorists, helping the company grow.

=== Recent history ===
In 1994, Amatuzio was inducted into the Lubricants World Hall of Fame. Into the 2000s, AMSOIL developed nanofiber materials to be used in oil filters for increased filtration and durability. Nanofiber materials were also developed for air filters, resulting in better performance than traditional cellulose fiber filters. AMSOIL has also developed gear oil for wind turbines, with sale trends increasing through the late 2010s during the increase of renewable energy investments.

Amatuzio died on April 1, 2017. Today, Amatuzio's son, Alan Amatuzio, serves as AMSOIL Chairman & CEO.

== Sponsorships ==
AMSOIL sponsors several motorsports events, race series, motorcycle rallies, professional drivers, and other influencers. Examples include the USAC Amsoil National Sprint Car Series, Sturgis Motorcycle Rally, Championship Off-Road, the Ultimate Callout Challenge, Team O’Neil Rally School, off-road driver Bryce Menzies and many others. AMSOIL also has the naming rights to an ice hockey venue in Duluth, Minnesota, named AMSOIL Arena.

== Certifications and licenses ==
- NSF-ISR ISO 9001:2015 Certification
- NSF-ISR ISO 14001:2015 Certification
- API license
