= Crandon International Off-Road Raceway =

Racetrack

Coordinates: 45.572°N 88.9408°W

- Location: U.S. Route 8 1 mile west of Crandon, Wisconsin, USA
- Operator: board of directors, President Cliff Flannery
- Major events: Red Bull Crandon World Cup World Championship Off Road Races Forest County Potawatomi Spring Brush Run
- Website: https://crandonoffroad.com/

Short Course Road Course
- Surface: Dirt
- Length: 2.5 km (1.6 mi)
- Banking: varies
- Race lap record: 1:16.900 (Bryce Menzies, Ford, Menzies Motorsports, 2018 Red Bull World Cup, (Pro 4))
- Race lap record: 1:20.165 (Brian Deegan, Toyota, Deegan Off Road, 2018 Red Bull World Cup, (Pro 2))
- Race lap record: 123.341 (Travis Dinsmore, Ford, Sle-Co/ Dinsmore Racing, 2015 Bushrun qualifying, (Pro Lite))

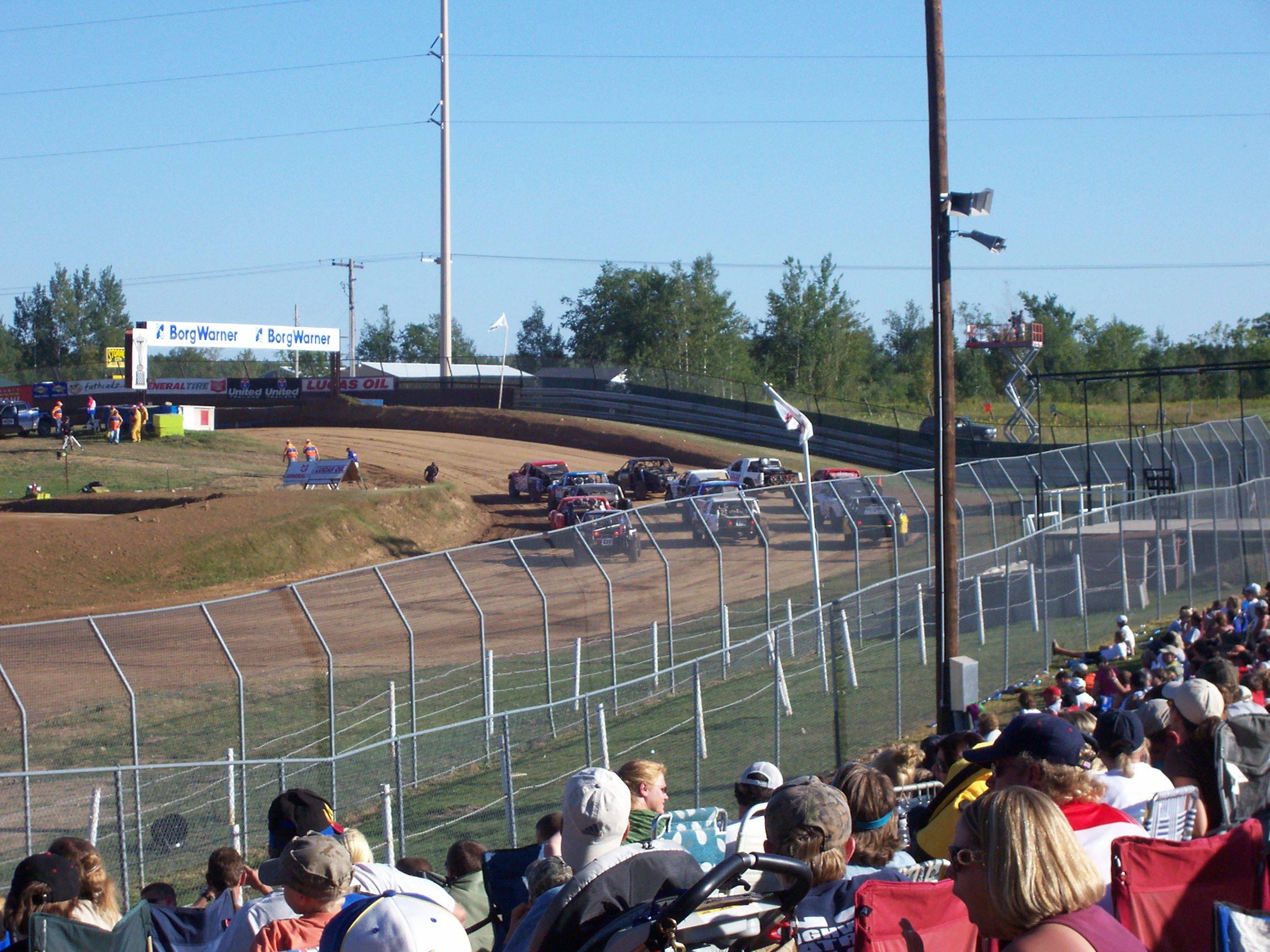
2WD trucks lined up to start the 2008 BorgWarner

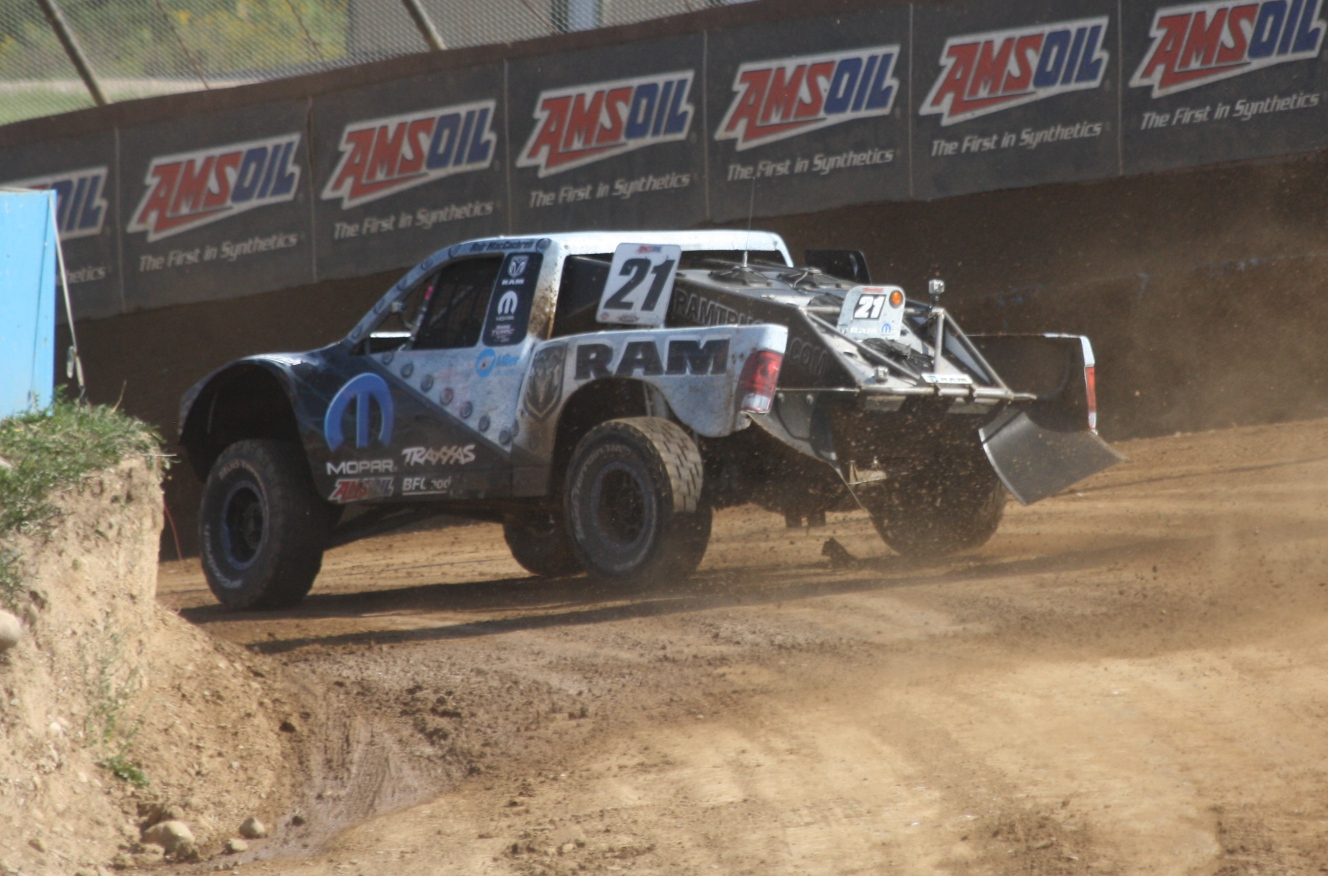
Rob MacCachren racing in 2013 truck

The Crandon International Off-Road Raceway is a short course off-road racing racetrack, located near Crandon, Wisconsin, United States on U.S. Route 8. The course hosts the World Championship Off-Road Races, Red Bull World Cup, Forest County Potawatomi Spring Brush Run Races, and Lucas Oil Midwest Short Course League points races. The track is a non-profit entity, run by a board of directors, with president Cliff Flannery.

== Track layout ==
The track started out as a 1.75-mile (2.82 km) long off-road track. The track was shortened to 1.5 miles (2.4 km). In 2002, a shortcut through the track was installed to allow a 1.25-mile (2.01 km) long lap. This allowed spectators to see the entire track, and it is utilized for selected events.

Races are started with a "land rush" start. The vehicles are started side by side in a standing start.

== World Championship Off-Road Races ==
The "World Championship Off-Road Races" were first held in a 101-mile (163 km) race on a 25 1/4 mile course in 1970. The event takes place on Labor Day weekend. Numerous sanctioning bodies have sanctioned the event. It was sanctioned by SODA until WSORR took over the sanction until 2007. CORR sanctioned in 2008, and after it folded, the Traxxas TORC Series sanctioned the 2009 event. All of the classes compete for a class world championship.

There is a separate overall world championship race. The race pits 2 wheel-drive (Pro 2) Trophy Trucks against 4×4 (Pro 4) trucks with the exception of the 2009 event, won by Kyle LeDuc, that featured Pro 4 trucks only. The 2WD trucks start ahead of the 4×4 trucks by a distance or time that has varied over the years. Scott Taylor was the first driver to pilot a 2WD truck to victory with victories in 2002 and 2008. In 2011, Chad Hord became the second driver to win the fall cup race in a two-wheel-drive Pro 2 truck. C. J. Greaves is the only driver to win the race in both a Pro 2 (2013, 2018) and in a Pro 4 (2015). In 2010, AMSOIL took over title sponsorship of the shootout race from BorgWarner and the race was known as the AMSOIL Cup until 2019 when it was renamed the Red Bull Crandon World Cup. In some years, truck drivers from lower classes were allowed to compete along with the trophy trucks. With three wins each, Rob MacCachren (1999, 2000, 2001), Scott Douglas (1997, 2006, 2010), and C. J. Greaves (2013, 2015, 2018) are the event's winningest drivers. Johnny Greaves (2004, 2007), Kyle LeDuc (2009, 2014), and Scott Taylor (2002, 2008) are the other multi-time winners.

In some years of the 1970s, the prize money was split between all finishers or all division winners, on those years the driver with the fastest time is listed.

Winners of the Red Bull Crandon World Cup:

- 2025 R. J. Anderson (Red Bull Cup)
- 2024 C. J. Greaves (Red Bull Cup)
- 2023 Keegan Kincaid (Red Bull Cup)
- 2022 C. J. Greaves (Red Bull Cup)
- 2021 Keegan Kincaid (Red Bull Cup)
- 2020 R. J. Anderson (Red Bull Cup)
- 2019 R. J. Anderson (Red Bull Cup)
- 2018 C. J. Greaves (2WD) (AMSOIL Cup)
- 2017 Bryce Menzies (AMSOIL Cup)
- 2016 Keegan Kincaid (2WD) (AMSOIL Cup)
- 2015 C. J. Greaves (AMSOIL Cup)
- 2014 Kyle LeDuc (AMSOIL Cup)
- 2013 C. J. Greaves (2WD) (AMSOIL Cup)
- 2012 Ricky Johnson (AMSOIL Cup)
- 2011 Chad Hord (2WD) (AMSOIL Cup)
- 2010 Scott Douglas (AMSOIL Cup)
- 2009 Kyle LeDuc (Borg-Warner Challenge)
- 2008 Scott Taylor (2WD) (Borg-Warner Challenge)
- 2007 Johnny Greaves (Borg-Warner Challenge)
- 2006 Scott Douglas (Borg-Warner Challenge)
- 2005 Jason Baldwin (Borg-Warner Challenge)
- 2004 Johnny Greaves (Borg-Warner Challenge)
- 2003 Carl Renezeder (Borg-Warner Challenge)
- 2002 Scott Taylor (2WD) (Borg-Warner Challenge)
- 2001 Rob MacCachren (Borg-Warner Challenge)
- 2000 Rob MacCachren (Borg-Warner Challenge)
- 1999 Rob MacCachren (Borg-Warner Challenge)
- 1998 Curt LeDuc (Borg-Warner Challenge)
- 1997 Scott Douglas (Borg-Warner Challenge)
- 1996 Jack Flannery (Borg-Warner Challenge)
- 1995 Steve Kelley (Borg-Warner Challenge)
- 1994 Scott Taylor (heavy metal: Class 2×4 & 4×4 production challenge)
- 1993 Geoff Dorr (heavy metal)
- 1992 Jack Flannery (heavy metal)
- 1991 Walker Evans (heavy metal)
- 1990 Walker Evans (heavy metal)
- 1989 Brad Mihalko (heavy metal)
- 1988 Jack Flannery (heavy metal)
- 1987 Jack Flannery (heavy metal)
- 1986 Jeff Probst (rear)
- 1985 Curt LeDuc (front engine) and Art Schmidt (rear engine)
- 1984 Mark Seidler (front engine) and Scott Taylor (rear engine)
- 1983 Geoff Dorr (front) and Kevin Probst (rear)
- 1982 John Heidtman (front) and Dave Vandermissen (rear)
- 1981 John Witt (front) and Scott Taylor (rear)
- 1980 Geoff Dorr (front) and Dale Woddard (rear)
- 1979 Larry Statezny
- 1978 Jack Flannery
- 1977 Jack Flannery
- 1976 Gary Slack
- 1975 Jeff Smith
- 1974 Jerry Blaszek
- 1973 Bob Warren
- 1972 Bob Warren
- 1971 Louis Flohr and Geoffrey Dorr
- 1970 Jim Zbella and Wally Schauer

== Brush Run races ==
The Brush Run races are held in June. The event used to be called the Spring Brush Run. Featured at the Brush Run is the heavy-metal shootout race, now called the "Crandon Cup". The trophy had been known as the "Governor's Cup".

Winners:

- 2025 Keegan Kincaid (Pro 2)
- 2024 C. J. Greaves (Pro 4)
- 2023 C. J. Greaves (Pro 4)
- 2022 C. J. Greaves (Pro 4)
- 2021 Jerett Brooks (Pro 2)
- 2020 Kyle Kleiman (Pro 2) – Postponed to September due to COVID-19 pandemic
- 2019 Keegan Kincaid (Pro 2)
- 2018 Johnny Greaves (Pro 4)
- 2017 Johnny Greaves (Pro 4)
- 2016 Keegan Kincaid (Pro 2)
- 2015 Johnny Greaves (Pro 4)
- 2014 Chad Hord (Pro 2)
- 2013 Johnny Greaves
- 2012 Rob MacCachren
- 2011 Jeff Kincaid (Pro 2)
- 2010 Jeff Kincaid (Pro 2)
- 2009 Ricky Johnson
- 2008 Kent Brascho
- 2007 Carl Renezeder
- 2006 Johnny Greaves
- 2005 Josh Baldwin
- 2004 Carl Renezeder
- 2003 Johnny Greaves
- 2002 Scott Taylor (first 2-wheel drive winner)
- 2001 Rob MacCachren
- 2000 Rob MacCachren
- 1999 Jack Flannery
- 1998 Jamey Flannery
- 1997 Jack Flannery
- 1996 Curt LeDuc
- 1995 Rob MacCachren
- 1994 Curt LeDuc

== Images ==
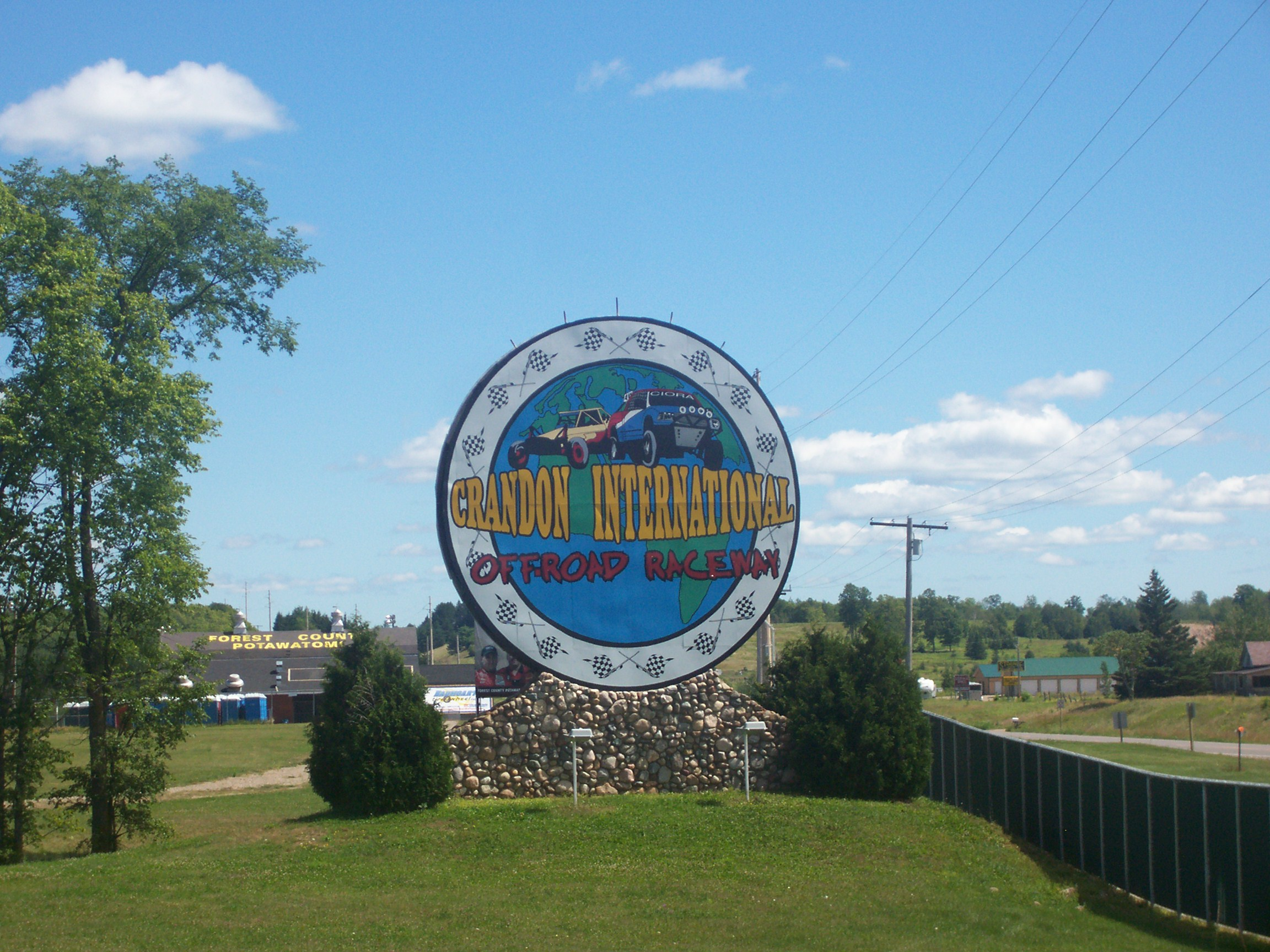
Sign

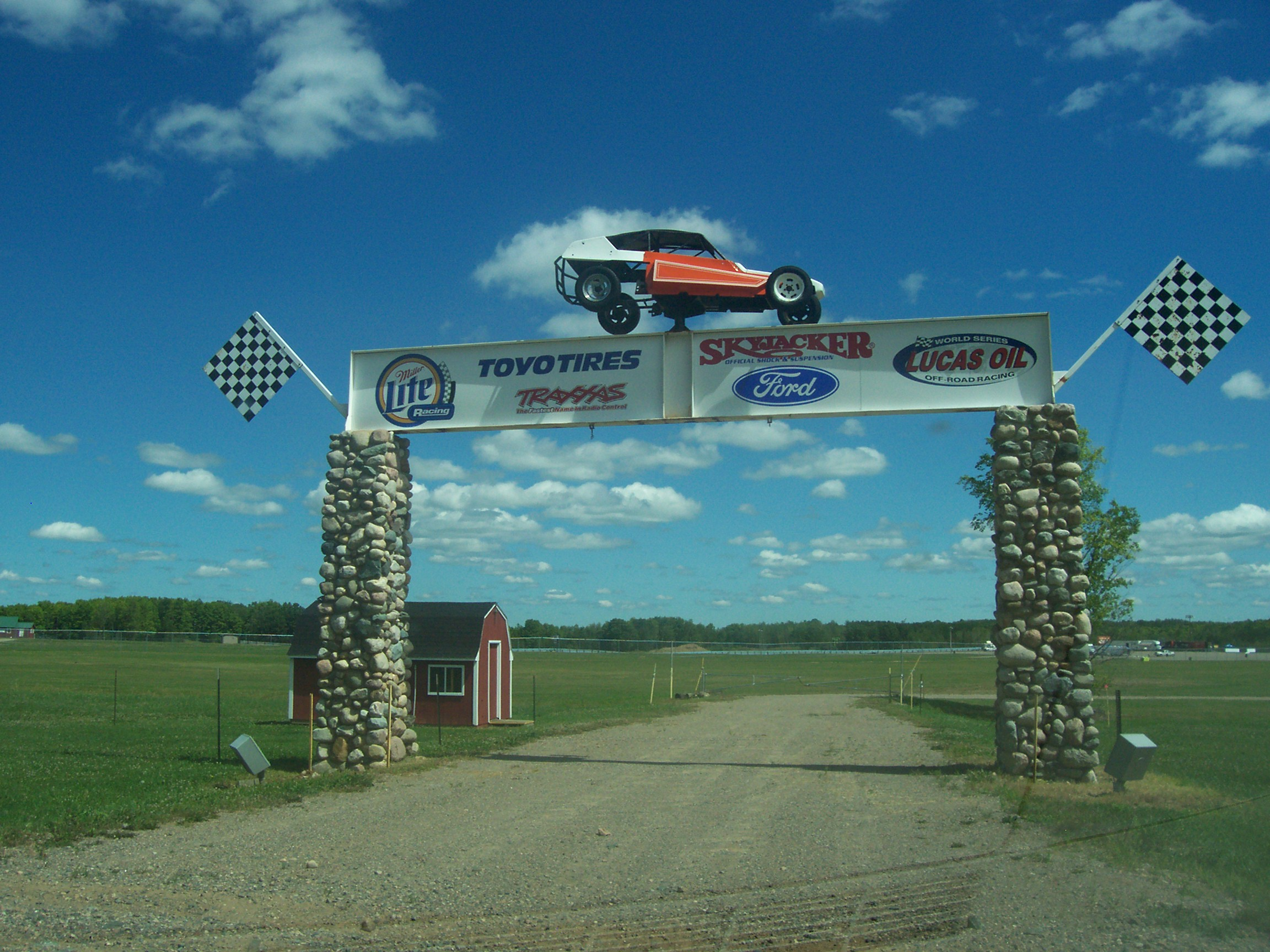
Entrance arch

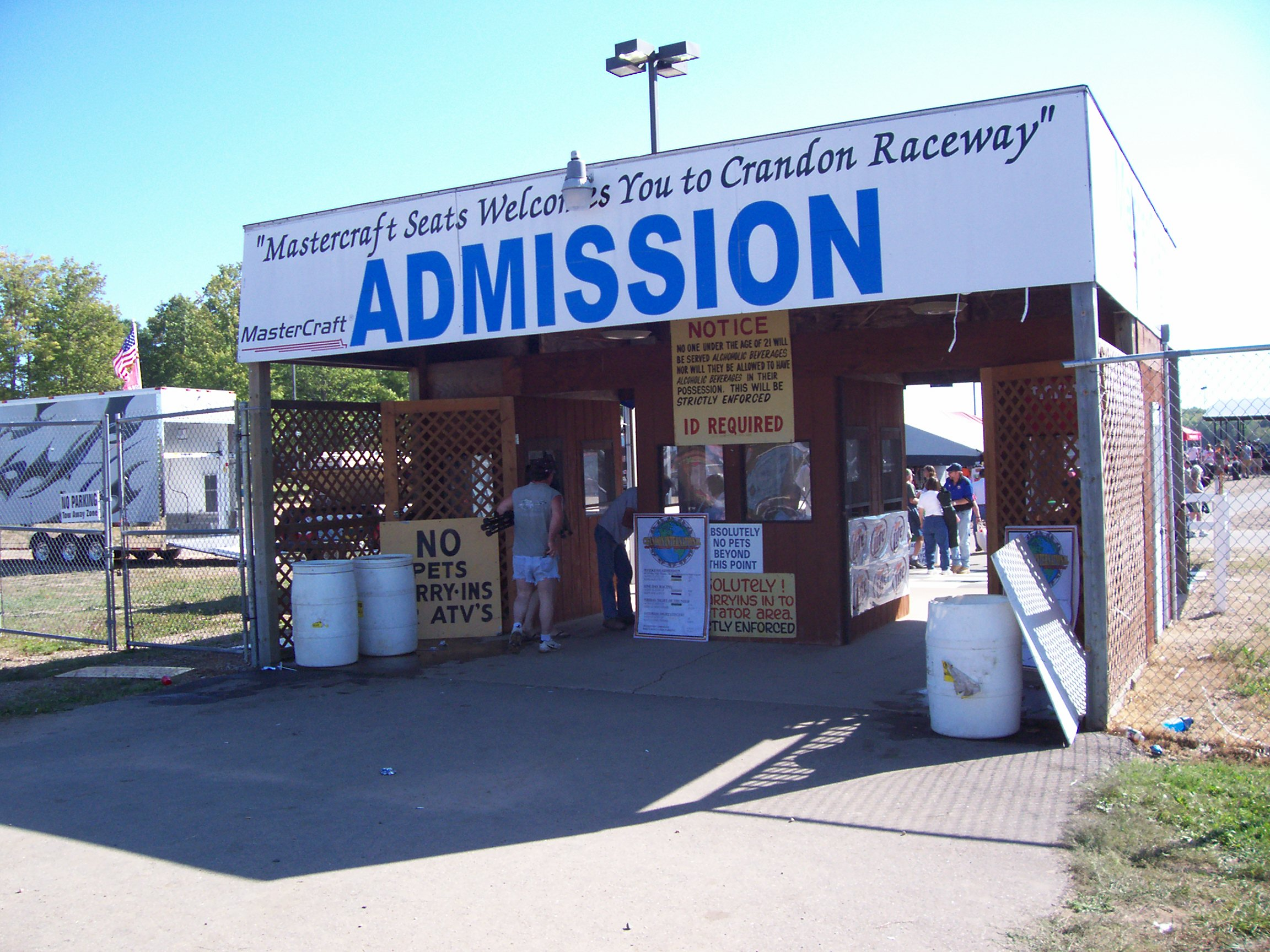
Ticket booth

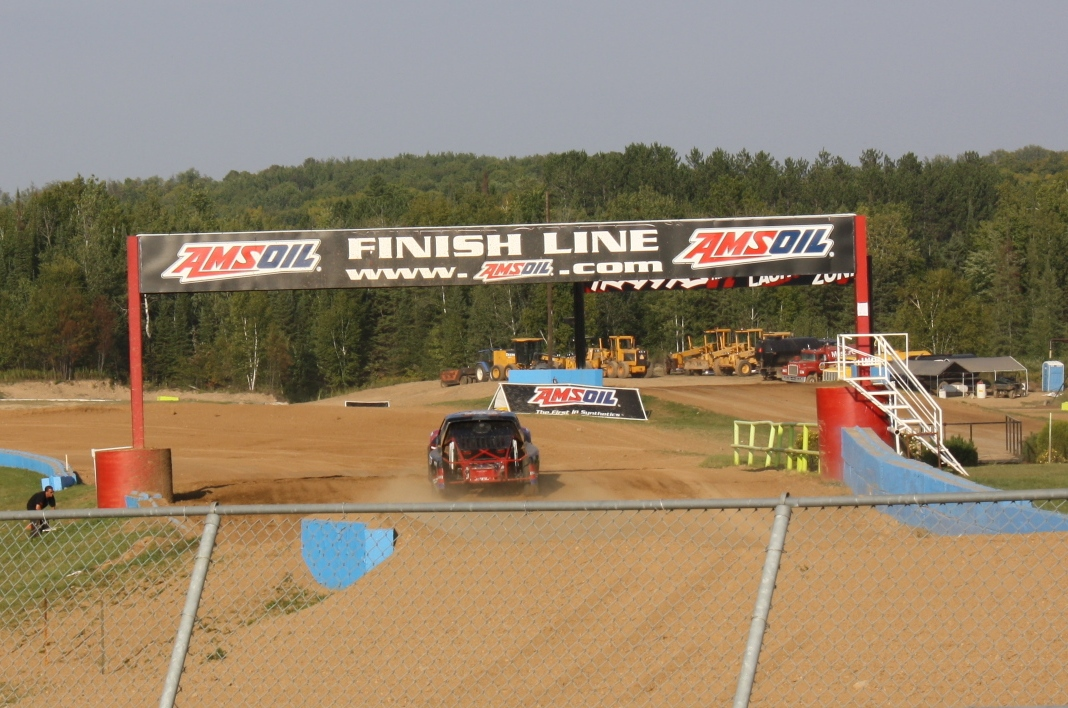
Finish line

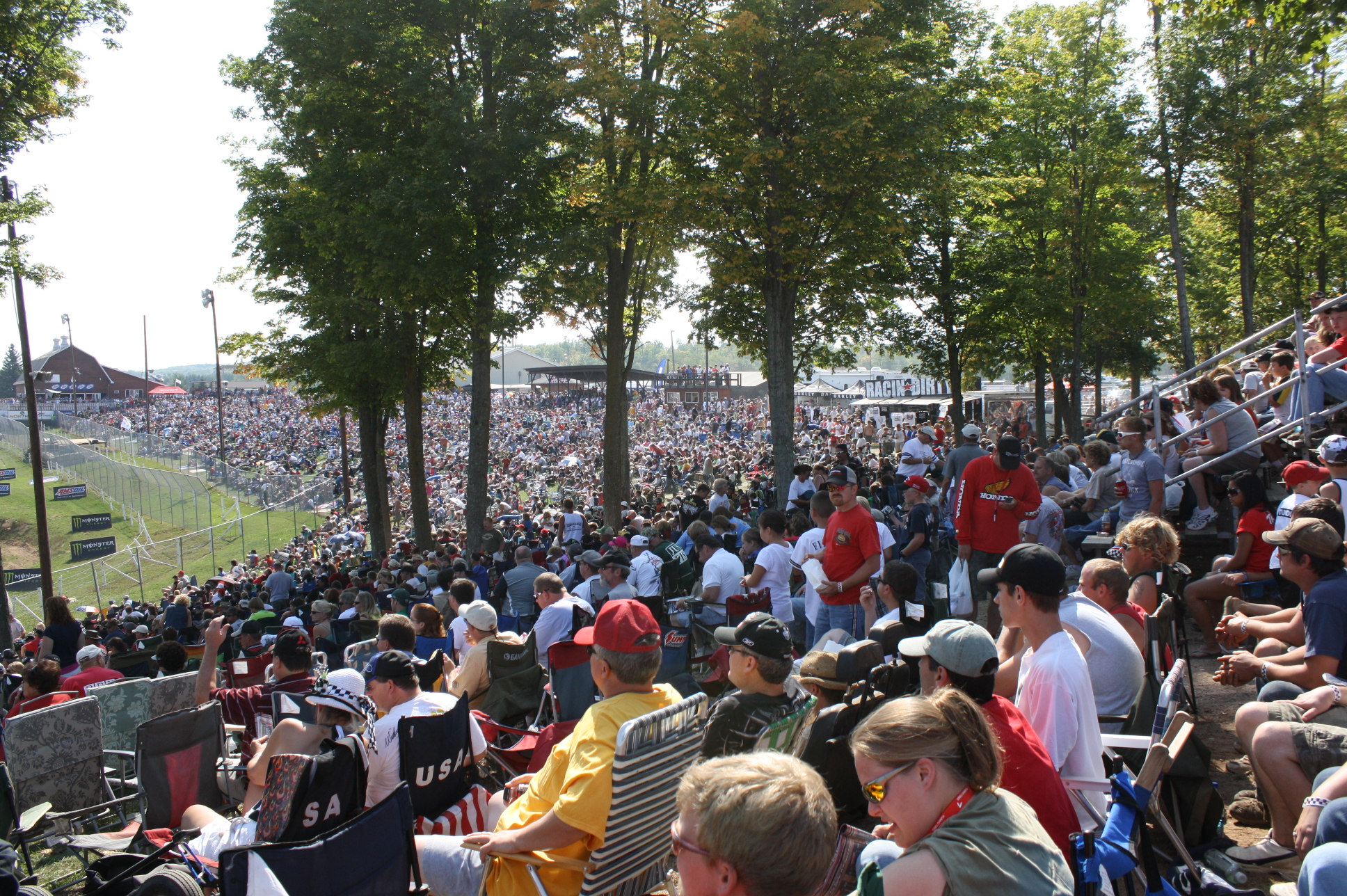
Crowd at the 2009 BorgWarner World Championship

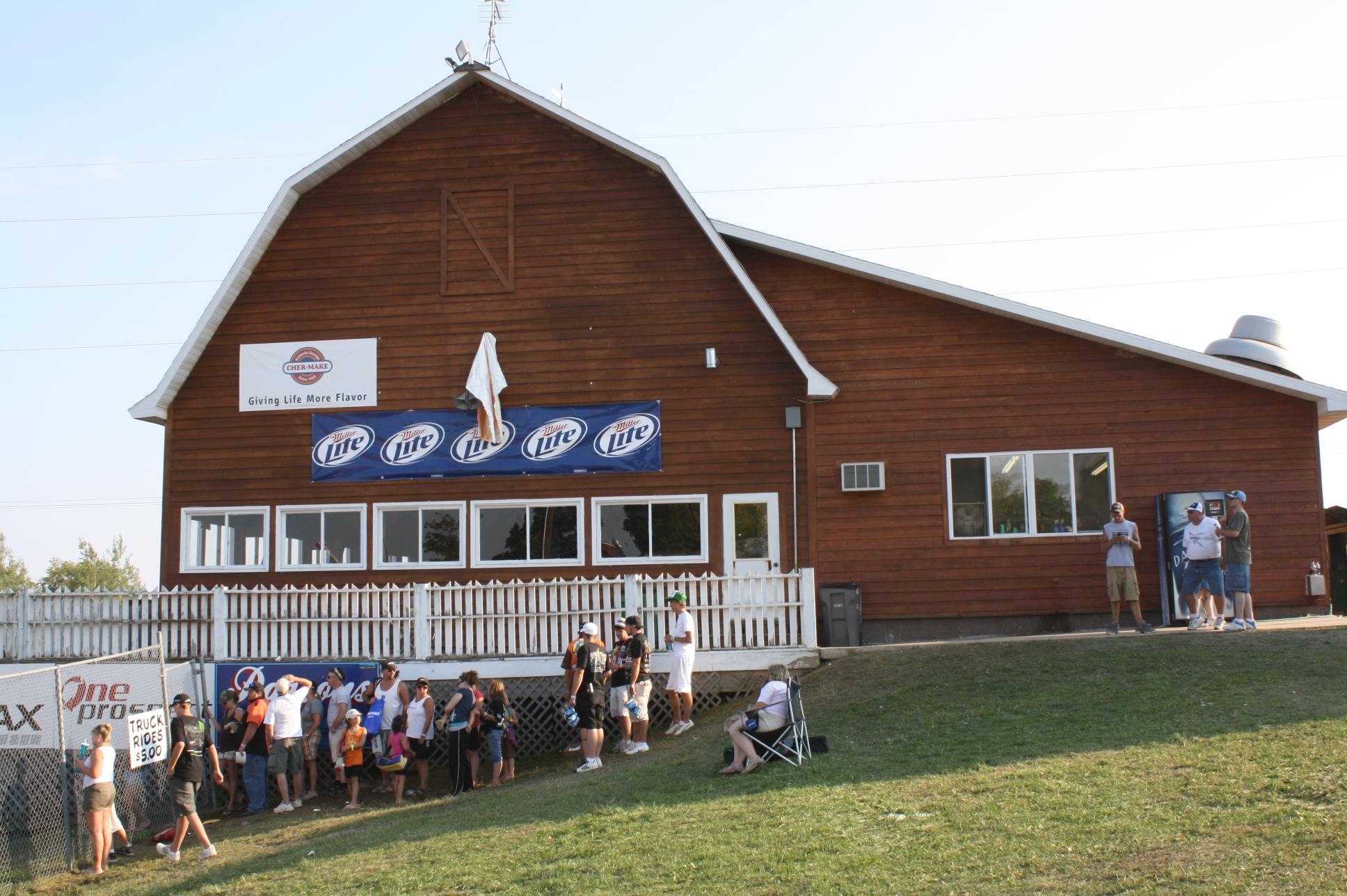
The Barn

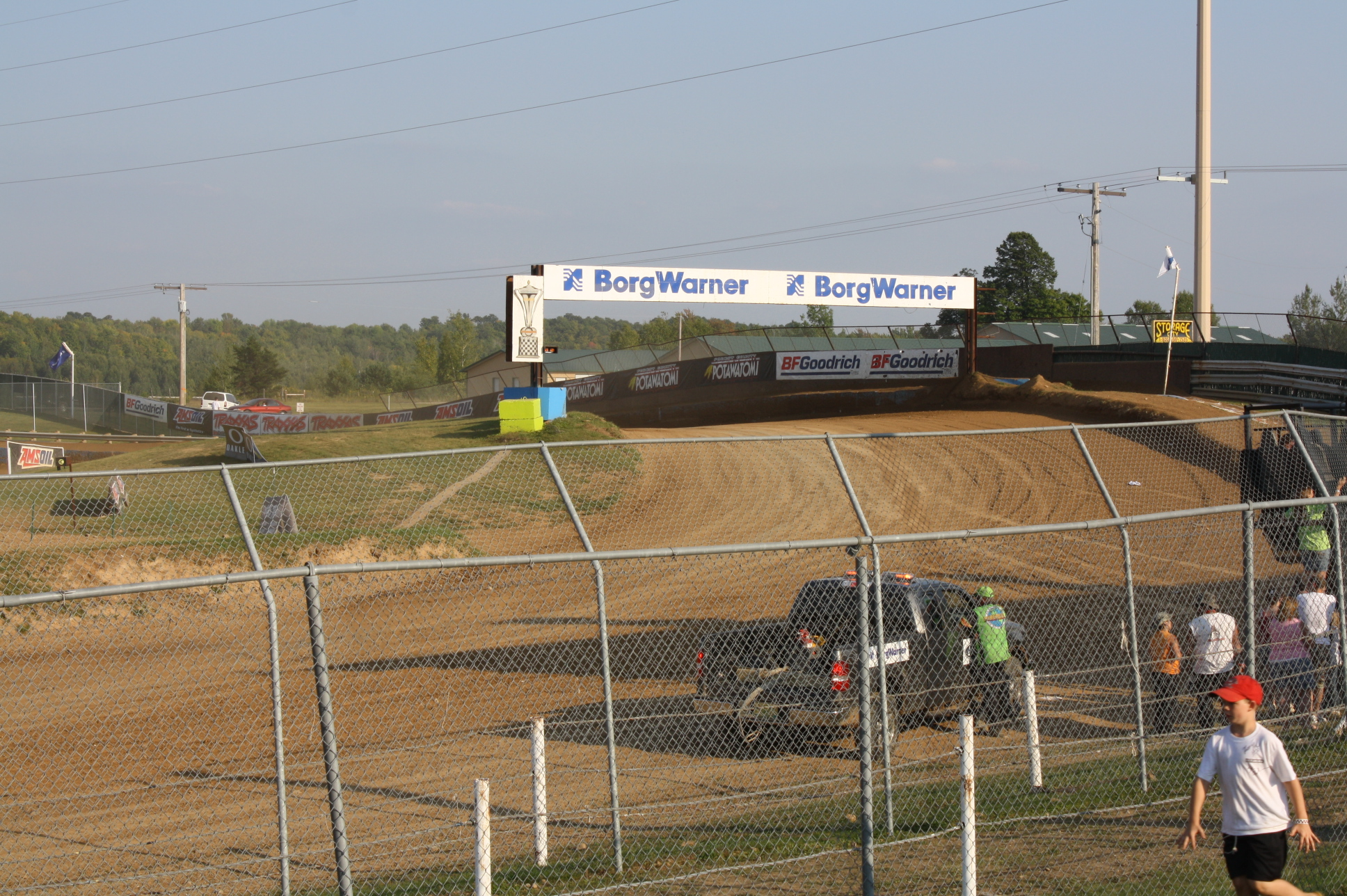
Southwest turn

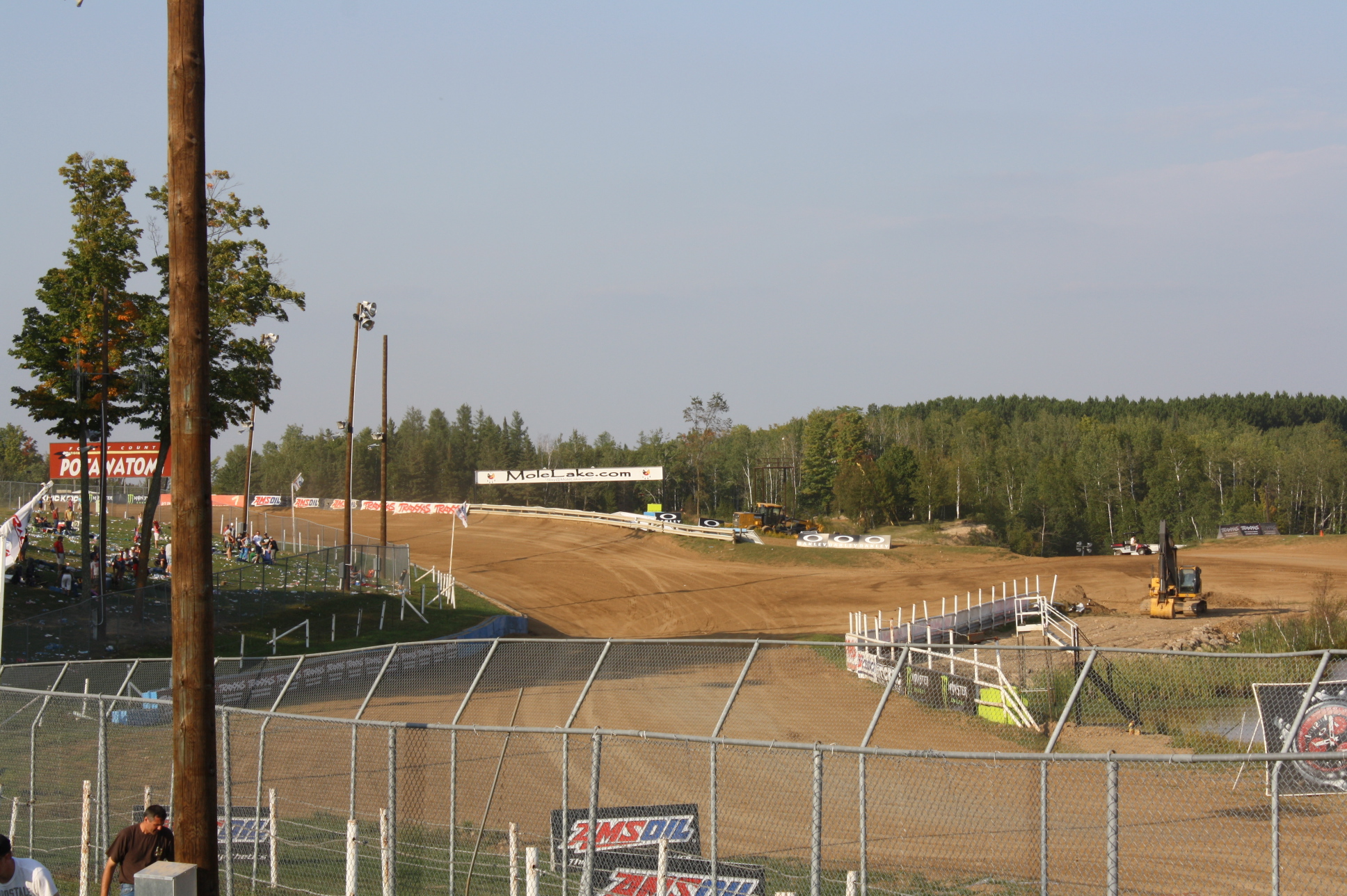
Frontstretch

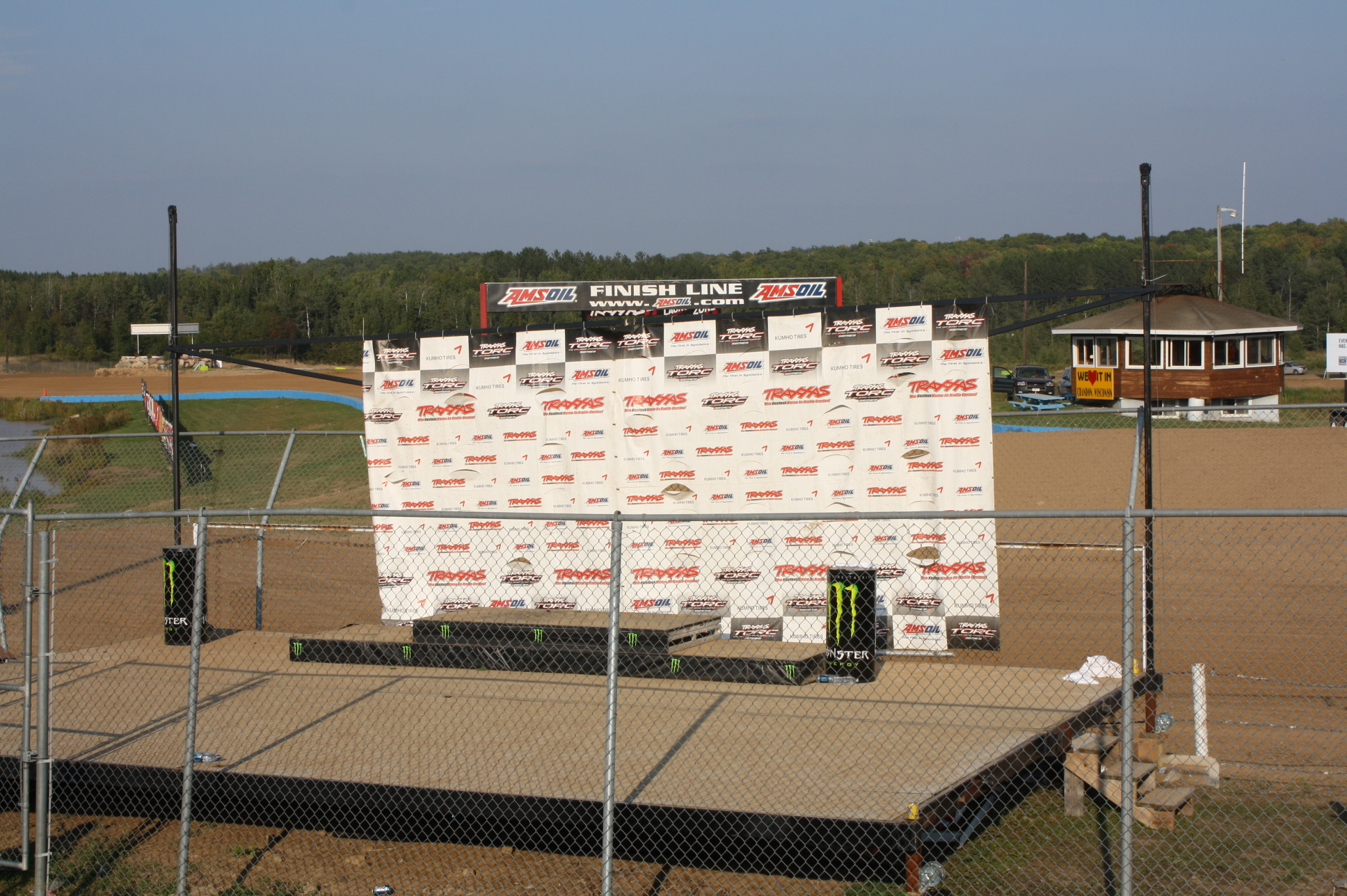
Victory Lane

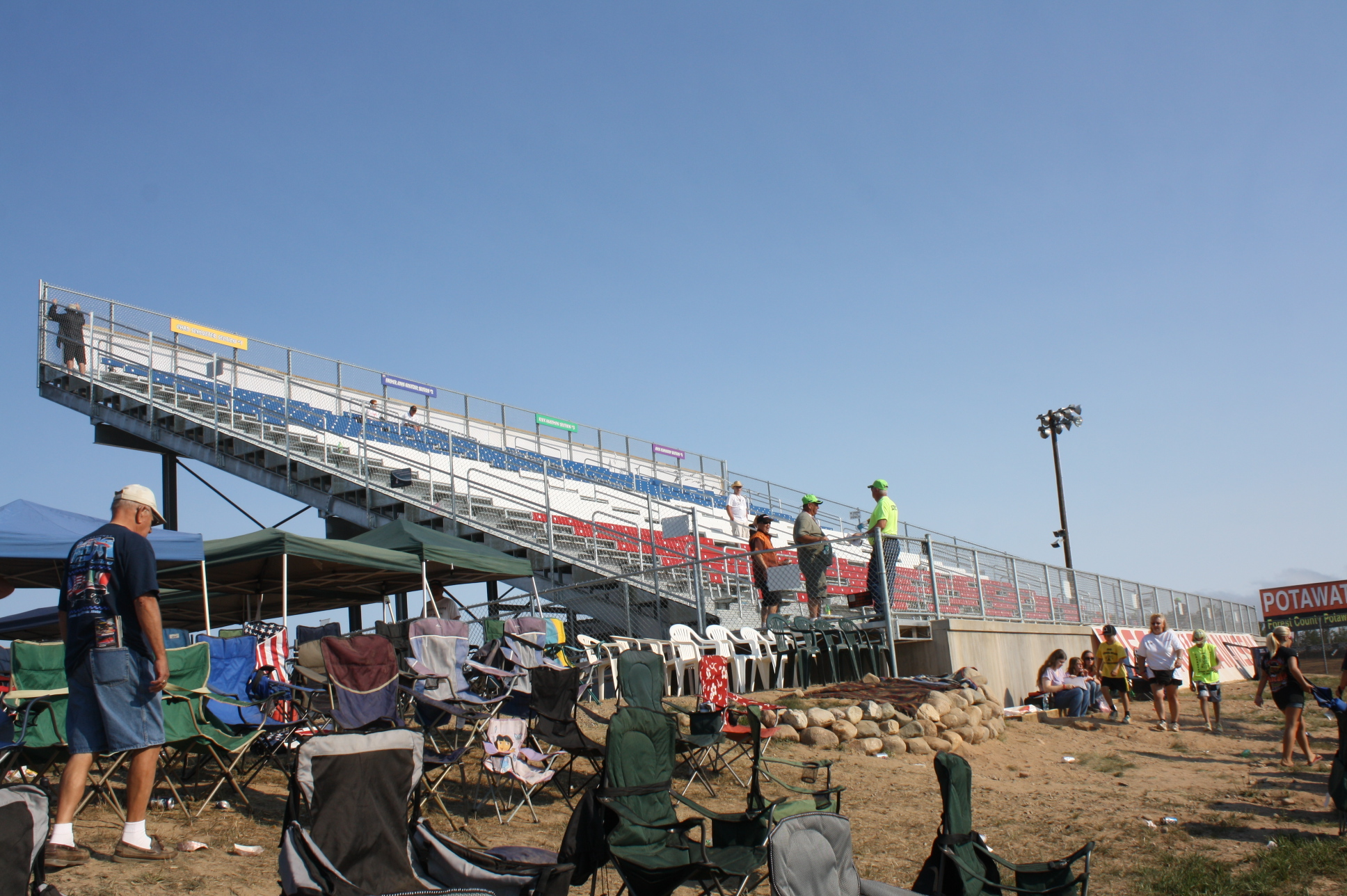
New grandstand in 2012
