= Walker Evans (racing driver) =

American racing driver (1938–2025)

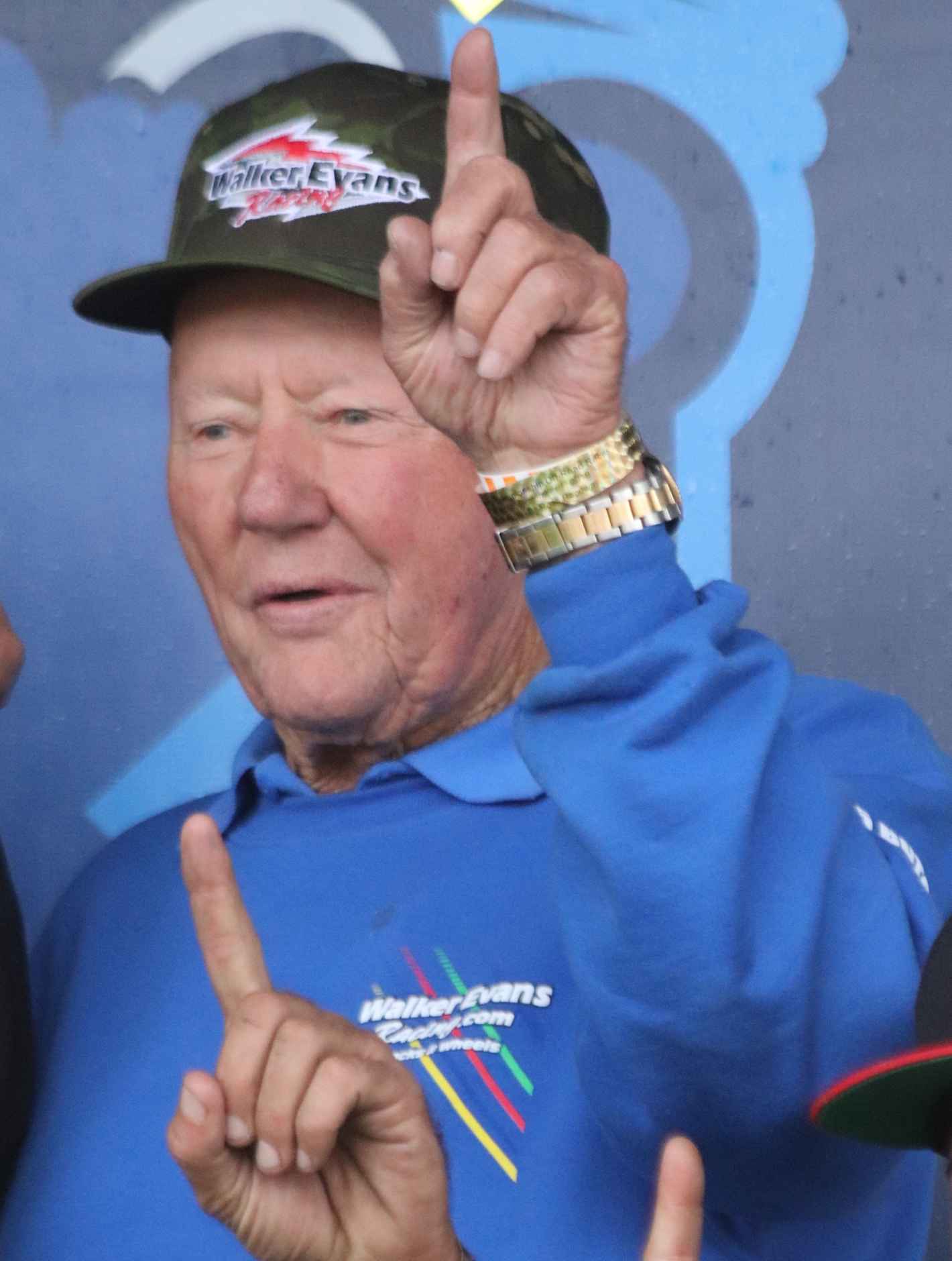
- Evans in 2019
- Born: December 3, 1938; Cedar Lake, Michigan, U.S.
- Died: August 2, 2025 (aged 86)
- Achievements: 21 Offroad Racing Championships, including SODA and CORR; 9 Baja 1000 class wins
- Awards: Off-road Motorsports Hall of Fame (2004); Motorsports Hall of Fame of America (2015); West Coast Stock Car Hall of Fame (2017)

NASCAR FedEx Freight Truck Series career
- 41 races run over 2 years
- Best finish: 14th (1995)
- First race: 1995 Skoal Bandit Copper World Classic (Phoenix)
- Last race: 1996 GM Goodwrench / AC Delco 300 (Phoenix)
Wins	Top tens	Poles
0	4	0

Roger Walker Evans (December 3, 1938 – August 2, 2025) was an American professional off road racing driver and member of the Off-road Motorsports Hall of Fame. He was also a driver and owner in the NASCAR Craftsman Truck Series. Nicknamed "The Legend", he was the father of off-road racer Evan Evans.

== Racing career ==
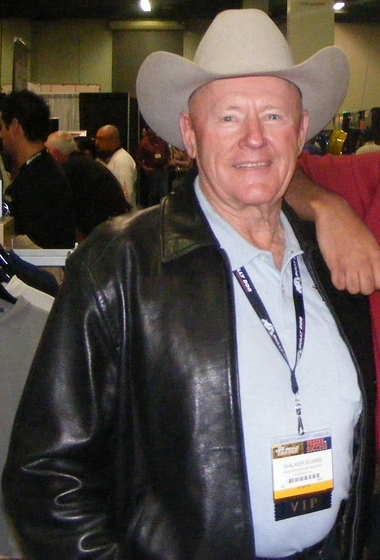
Evans in 2008

=== Off-road ===
Born in Cedar Lake, Michigan, Evans began his off-road career in cross-country events in SCORE International events, including the premier event: the Baja 500. His first sample of racing was in 1969, when he drove a Rambler American for the American Motors and actor James Garner sponsored team to a third-place finish in the Baja 500. His first purpose built race truck was Ford F-100 donated by Marion Beaver at Parker Motor Company and built by Bill Stroppe. The truck won 16 of 17 races. He won the Baja 1000 nine times.

Evans had 142 total victories and 21 championship titles in off-road desert and short course racing. He had multiple overall wins in the Baja 500, Baja 1000, Fireworks 250, Mint 400, and Parker 400.

Evans added the Mickey Thompson Entertainment Group Stadium Series events to his schedule to enhance his horizons. The series featured indoor races inside a stadium. The Walker Evans Racing Team won the MTEG Grand National Championship in 1999. He won his first SODA race in 1986 at the Lake Geneva Raceway in Lake Geneva, Wisconsin. He won the 1994 and 1995 Class-8 (two-wheel drive) championships in SODA. He met fellow competitor Brendan Gaughan during his SODA days. He moved to CORR when most of the SODA drivers switched series. He finished with his SODA career with three overall victories and 31 class wins. He was champion of CORR's highest division, Pro-4, in 1999. He won three races and the CORR Pro-4 championship in 2000 in his final full-time season in CORR before retirement from short-track off-road racing.

Around 1999, Evans began entering rock crawling events after a promotional trip to Moab.

=== NASCAR ===
==== Racing ====
Evans decided to try his hand as a driver/owner in the newly formed NASCAR SuperTruck Series in 1995. He had one top-ten finish in 18 races, and he finished 14th in the final points standings. He had three top-ten finishes in 23 events in 1996, and he finished 17th in the overall points standings.

==== Team ownership ====
Evans continued his Walker Evans Racing team after his retirement. He hired former SODA and CORR competitor Brendan Gaughan to race for him in 2002. Gaughan won twice, on his way to the Rookie of the Year title. In 2003, Gaughan was the CTS points leader going into the final race, but was crashed out.

== Death ==
Evans died on August 2, 2025, at the age of 86.

== Halls of Fame ==
Evans was inducted in the Off-road Motorsports Hall of Fame in 2004. In 2015, he was inducted in the Motorsports Hall of Fame of America. In 2022, he was inducted into the SEMA Hall Of Fame.

== Motorsports career results ==
=== NASCAR ===
(key) (Bold – Pole position awarded by qualifying time. Italics – Pole position earned by points standings or practice time. * – Most laps led.)

==== Craftsman Truck Series ====
NASCAR Craftsman Truck Series results
Year	Team	No.	Make	1	2	3	4	5	6	7	8	9	10	11	12	13	14	15	16	17	18	19	20	21	22	23	24	NCTS	Pts	Ref
1995	Walker Evans Racing	20	Dodge	PHO; 29	TUS; 18	SGS; 21	MMR; 27	POR; 23	EVG; 28	I70; 22	LVL	BRI; 12	MLW; 16	CNS; 10	HPT; 17	IRP; 16	FLM	RCH; 37	MAR; 34	NWS; 28	SON; 13	MMR; 23	PHO; 23					14th	1744	
1996	Walker Evans Racing	20	Dodge	HOM; 28	PHO; 36	POR; 18	EVG; 23	TUS; 18	CNS; 18	HPT; 16	BRI; 10	NZH; 32	MLW; 30	LVL; 26	I70; 24	IRP; 27	FLM; 20	GLN; 10	NSV; 17	RCH; 30	NHA; 14	MAR; 30	NWS; 26	SON; 24	MMR; 9	PHO; 31	LVS; DNQ	17th	2224	

^{1} Ineligible for series points
