= August 1931 =

Month of 1931

<<	August 1931					>>
Su	Mo	Tu	We	Th	Fr	Sa
						1
2	3	4	5	6	7	8
9	10	11	12	13	14	15
16	17	18	19	20	21	22
23	24	25	26	27	28	29
30	31

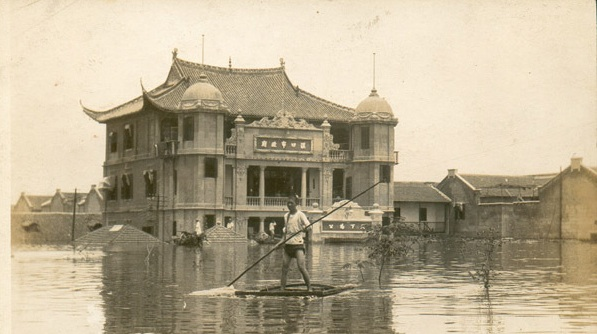
August 1931: Flooding drowns at least 140,000 along China's Yangtze River, leads to starvation and cholera that kills millions (pictured: Hankou business district of Wuhan)

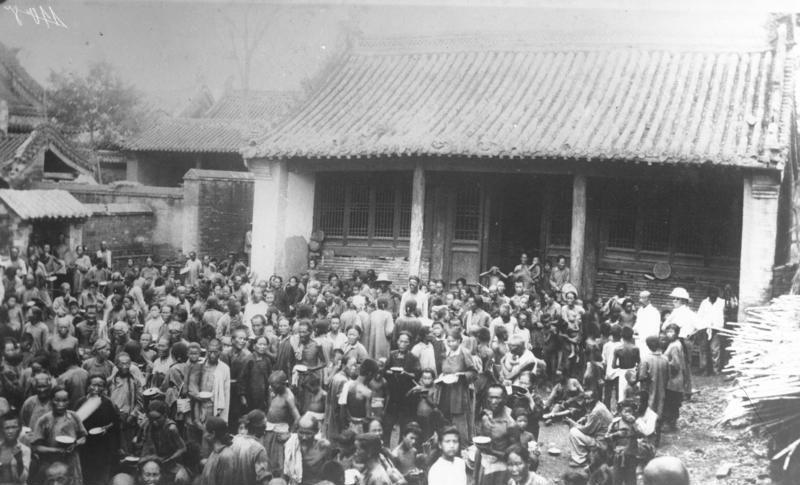
Flood survivors in China

The following events occurred in August 1931:

== August 1, 1931 (Saturday) ==
- The Reichsbank raised its interest rate for loans to 15%, a 5 percent jump from July 16.
- Born: Tom Wilson, American cartoonist known for creating the comic panel Ziggy; in Grant Town, West Virginia (d. 2011)

== August 2, 1931 (Sunday) ==
- In a referendum on autonomy in the Spanish province of Catalonia, citizens voted overwhelmingly in favor of autonomy within the Second Spanish Republic, which was approved by parliament six weeks later.
- The Banque de France and Federal Reserve Bank of New York each lent £25 million to the Bank of England.

== August 3, 1931 (Monday) ==
- Three African-American people died in a riot in Chicago. Police fought a crowd of 2,000 protesting against an apartment landlord evicting an elderly African-American woman.

== August 4, 1931 (Tuesday) ==
- A new German decree went into force making the purchase of foreign currency against the Reichsmark only possible through the Reichsbank.
- Prominent stage actress Ina Claire was granted a divorce from her husband of two years, silent film star John Gilbert.

== August 5, 1931 (Wednesday) ==
- German banks allowed regular transactions for the first time since July 13.
- Born: Gita Dey, Indian Bengali film actress; in Calcutta, West Bengal, British India (d. 2011)

== August 6, 1931 (Thursday) ==
- Japan and China re-established normal diplomatic relations.
- Died: Bix Beiderbecke (Leon Bismark Beiderbecke), 28, American jazz musician, died of lobar pneumonia and cerebral edema aggravated by alcoholism.

== August 7, 1931 (Friday) ==
- In Los Angeles, Marlene Dietrich was named as "the other woman" in the legal hearing of lawsuits filed by Riza Royce, wife of director Josef von Sternberg. Royce was suing Dietrich for $100,000 for defamation and von Sternberg for $500,000 for alienation of affections.
- The comedy film Huckleberry Finn, starring Jackie Coogan in the title role, was released.
- Born: Charles E. Rice, American legal scholar and author; in New York City (d. 2015)

== August 8, 1931 (Saturday) ==
- Bobby Burke of the Washington Senators pitched a 5-0 no-hitter against the Boston Red Sox.

== August 9, 1931 (Sunday) ==
- A referendum seeking to force the dissolution of the Prussian Landtag failed because only 37.1% of eligible voters showed up to vote, and a 50% turnout was required in order for it to pass.
- Sixteen people died in Communist-backed rioting in Berlin during the referendum campaign.
- Born: Mário Zagallo, Brazilian soccer football forward who played for, and later managed, the Brazil national team, winning the FIFA World Cup as a player in 1958 and 1962, as a manager in 1970, and as an assistant manager in 1994; in Atalaia, Alagoas state (d. 2024)
- Died: Paul Anlauf (42) and Franz Lenck, Berlin Police captains, were assassinated by members of the paramilitary wing of the Communist Party of Germany. One of the killers was future Stasi head Erich Mielke.

== August 10, 1931 (Monday) ==
- German police padlocked the Communist Party of Germany (KPD) headquarters, located at the Karl Liebknecht House in Bülow-Platz, as punishment for rioting the day before. Publication of the KPD newspaper Red Flag was also suspended for two weeks.
- Cuban President Gerardo Machado declared martial law to put down a rebellion.
- Died: Richard Wettstein, 67, Austrian botanist who created the Wettstein system of plant taxonomy

== August 11, 1931 (Tuesday) ==
- An 8.0 magnitude earthquake killed more than 10,000 people (at 21:18 UTC on August 10) in China's Xinjiang autonomous region. The epicenter of the quake was near the small town of Koktokay in Fuyun in northwestern China.
- The Hoover Moratorium plan was signed by representatives of the European World War One allies in London.
- Germany celebrated Constitution Day, the twelfth anniversary of the founding of the Weimar Republic. This year's festivities were dedicated to Heinrich Friedrich Karl vom und zum Stein on the centenary of his death.

== August 12, 1931 (Wednesday) ==
- The Reichsbank dropped its rate back down again to 10%.
- New York City mobster Jack "Legs" Diamond was sentenced to four years in prison for bootlegging in the illegal sale of liquor.
- Born: William Goldman, American film screenwriter, novelist and playwright, winner of two Academy Awards; in Chicago (d. 2018)

== August 13, 1931 (Thursday) ==
- The Mahatma Gandhi stunned Britain by announcing he would not be participating in the second Round Table Conference in London as expected because of serious breaches in the Gandhi–Irwin Pact.

== August 14, 1931 (Friday) ==
- Cuban revolutionary leaders Mario García Menocal and Carlos Mendieta surrendered to authorities in Pinar del Río Province.
- Carl Nielsen's Commotio was performed in public for the first time, at Aarhus Cathedral in Denmark.

== August 15, 1931 (Saturday) ==
- The French government extended a major loan to Hungary.
- The Soviet Union made education compulsory for illiterates between 16 and 50 years of age.
- Born: Joe Feeney, American tenor singer, in Grand Island, Nebraska (d. 2008)
- Died: Nigar Shikhlinskaya, 59, Azerbaijani nurse and World War One heroine

== August 16, 1931 (Sunday) ==
- A train collision near Leoben in Austria killed 13 people.
- Born: Betsy von Furstenberg, German-born American stage and TV actress; in Arnsberg (d. 2015)

== August 17, 1931 (Monday) ==
- Anti-Chinese sentiment increased in Japan after the Japanese government revealed that three Japanese nationals traveling in China had been arrested, killed and cremated. China admitted the action but contended that one of them was a spy.

== August 18, 1931 (Tuesday) ==
- The flooding on the Yangtse River in China reached its worst point when the water level peaked with waters as high as 53 feet (16 m) above normal river levels at Hankou in Wuhan province. The flooding, including subsequent famine and disease, killed about 3.7 million people in total, perhaps the worst natural disaster of the 20th century.
- The first worldwide radio broadcast of an opera was carried out during a production of Wagner's Tristan und Isolde at the Bayreuth Festspielhaus.
- A committee of bankers in Basel released a report recommending that credit be extended to Germany for another six months due to the country's inability to meet its debt obligations.
- Born:
  - Hans van Mierlo, Dutch politician who served as Foreign Minister and Deputy Prime Minister of the Netherlands; in Breda (d. 2010)
  - Bramwell Tillsley, Canadian charity administrator who served as the General of the Salvation Army during 1993 and 1994; in Kitchener, Ontario (d. 2019)

== August 19, 1931 (Wednesday) ==
- István Bethlen announced he was stepping down as Prime Minister of Hungary after ten years in power.
- Born: Willie Shoemaker, American jockey; in Fabens, Texas (d. 2003)
- Died: Aristides Agramonte, 63, Cuban American physician, pathologist and bacteriologist

== August 20, 1931 (Thursday) ==
- Spain passed a decree forbidding churches from selling their property, in response to a rumor that exiled cardinal Pedro Segura y Sáenz had ordered the churches to sell their property before it could be confiscated.
- Born: Don King, U.S. boxing promoter, in Cleveland
- Died: Waldemar von Baussnern, 64, German classical and operatic composer

== August 21, 1931 (Friday) ==
- The eighth Great German Radio Exhibition opened in Berlin. Attractions included the first electronic television receiver with a Braun tube, manufactured by Loewe AG.
- Babe Ruth hit his 600th career home run during a game against the St. Louis Browns.

== August 22, 1931 (Saturday) ==
- King George V cut short his vacation at Balmoral Castle to head back to London as the resignation of the Ramsay MacDonald government appeared imminent due to the country's budget deficit crisis.

== August 23, 1931 (Sunday) ==
- Lefty Grove started a baseball game for the Philadelphia Athletics tied for the American League record of most consecutive wins with 16. Facing the St. Louis Browns, Grove lost his shot at sole possession of the record when he was outduelled by Dick Coffman and lost 1–0. After the game, Grove went on an infamous rampage in the clubhouse and destroyed everything in sight, from uniforms to lockers to chairs.
- Born:
  - Barbara Eden, American TV actress best known for the series I Dream of Jeannie; as Barbara Jean Morehead in Tucson, Arizona
  - Lyle Lahey, political cartoonist; in Abrams, Wisconsin (d. 2013)

== August 24, 1931 (Monday) ==
- Ramsay MacDonald submitted his resignation as Prime Minister of the United Kingdom and then agreed to form a new coalition government which would include representatives of all three major parties.
- The Soviet Union and France signed a non-aggression pact.
- Gyula Károlyi formed a government as the new Prime Minister of Hungary.

== August 25, 1931 (Tuesday) ==
- Ramsay MacDonald announced his new cabinet, the First National Government, which included members of the Conservative and Liberal parties.
- Charles Lindbergh and his wife Anne Morrow Lindbergh landed in Tokyo, completing a journey of over 7,000 miles (11,000 km) from New York.
- Born:
  - Regis Philbin, American television personality and popular talk show host; in the Bronx, New York (d. 2020)
  - Hal Fishman, Los Angeles news anchor with 47 consecutive years as the anchorman for various L.A. stations; in Brooklyn, New York (d. 2007)

== August 26, 1931 (Wednesday) ==
- The Mahatma Gandhi announced that he had reversed his decision not to attend the Round Table Conference after a three-hour discussion with Viceroy The Earl of Willingdon.
- The Portuguese Army put down the August 26 Revolt in Lisbon.
- Deputy Sheriff James Leo McDermott, 40, of the Los Angeles County Sheriff's Department died in a freak accident. After stepping out of his car at an oil station, the vehicle began to roll forwards, and McDermott attempted to hop onto the car's running board to stop it. It carried him forward and slammed him into a hook used to hold air and water hoses, which impaled him just below the heart.
- Born: Geoffrey Dickens, British Conservative politician, in London (d. 1995)
- Died:
  - Osachi Hamaguchi, 61, twice Prime Minister of Japan, died of a sepsis infection less than nine months after he had been wounded in an assassination attempt. Hamaguchi had resigned on April 14 because of his deteriorating condition.
  - Frank Harris, 75, Irish-born American editor, journalist and publisher

== August 27, 1931 (Thursday) ==
- The German flying boat Dornier Do X arrived in New York, ending a 12,500-mile (20,100 km) trip lasting almost a year that spanned four continents.
- Born: Sri Chinmoy (Chinmoy Kumar Ghose), Indian-born spiritual master who popularized meditation techniques in the U.S.; in Shakpura, Chittagong District, East Bengal, British India (d. 2007)
- Died: Francis Marion Smith, 85, American business magnate and civic builder

== August 28, 1931 (Friday) ==
- Britain's Labour Party MPs voted to oust Prime Minister Ramsay MacDonald as its leader. Former Foreign Secretary Arthur Henderson was named as his successor.
- Born: John Shirley-Quirk, English bass-baritone opera singer; in Liverpool (d. 2014)

== August 29, 1931 (Saturday) ==
- The Mahatma Gandhi set sail on the SS Rajputana from Bombay to Marseille en route to the Round Table Conference in London. "I see nothing on the horizon to warrant hope, but I am an optimist and I am hoping against hope. For me the service of India is identical with the service of humanity", Gandhi said as he boarded.
- In Clarksburg, West Virginia, Harry Powers confessed to the murder of a woman and three children that made national headlines.
- Billy Herman made his major league debut with the Chicago Cubs, getting a base hit in his only plate appearance.
- Died: David T. Abercrombie, 64, co-founder of Abercrombie & Fitch

== August 30, 1931 (Sunday) ==
- The Netherlands and Turkey signed a trade and sea navigation treaty.
- Born:
  - Jack Swigert, American astronaut who piloted the command module on Apollo 13; in Denver (d. 1982)
  - Jacques Braunstein, Romanian-born Venezuelan jazz musician; in Bucharest (d. 2009)
- Died: Mickey Duffy, 44, Polish-American mobster in Philadelphia, was shot to death in his hotel room in Atlantic City, New Jersey

== August 31, 1931 (Monday) ==
- A court in Kaunas acquitted former Lithuanian Prime Minister Augustinas Voldemaras of charges of high treason.
- Born:
  - Jean Béliveau, Canadian ice hockey centre with 20 years for the Montreal Canadiens in the NHL, later inducted to the Hockey Hall of Fame; in Trois-Rivières, Quebec (d. 2014)
  - Kenny Burrell, U.S. jazz guitarist; in Detroit
  - Noble Willingham, American film and TV actor; in Mineola, Texas (d. 2004)
  - Hamilton O. Smith, U.S. microbiologist and 1978 Nobel laureate for his work in discovering and identifying the restriction enzyme within DNA; in New York City (d. 2025)
- Died: Hall Caine, 78, popular British Manx novelist and Isle of Man politician
