= Arthur J. Whitcomb =

American farmer, lawyer and teacher

- Born: 20 April 1886
- Died: 3 April 1942
- Education: University of Wisconsin-Oshkosh, University of Wisconsin Law School
- Occupations: farmer, politician
- Political party: Republican Party

Arthur J. Whitcomb (April 20, 1886 – April 3, 1942) was an American farmer, lawyer and teacher.

Born on a farm, near the community of Abrams, Wisconsin, Whitcomb graduated from Oshkosh Normal School (now University of Wisconsin–Oshkosh). He taught at Merrill High School in Merrill, Wisconsin and was a football coach. Whitcomb received his law degree from University of Wisconsin Law School and practiced law in Oconto, Wisconsin from 1916 to 1930. Whitcomb served in the Wisconsin State Assembly in 1915 and was a Republican. Whitcomb was counsel for the Wisconsin Electric Power Company, director of the Wisconsin Chamber of Commerce, and a member of the Wisconsin State Defense Council at the time of his death. Whitcomb died suddenly of a heart attack while staying at a hotel in Milwaukee, Wisconsin.
