= July 1931 =

Month of 1931

<<	July 1931					>>
Su	Mo	Tu	We	Th	Fr	Sa
			1	2	3	4
5	6	7	8	9	10	11
12	13	14	15	16	17	18
19	20	21	22	23	24	25
26	27	28	29	30	31

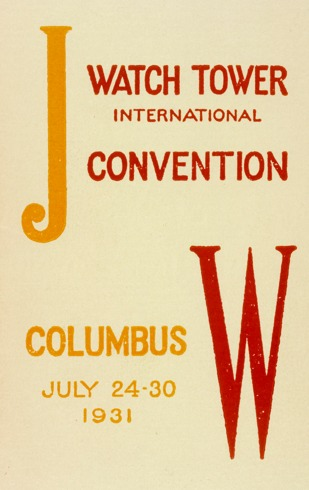
July 26, 1931: International Bible Students Association changes name to Jehovah's Witnesses

July 1, 1931: Wiley Post and Harold Gatty complete flight around the world in record 8 days and 16 hours

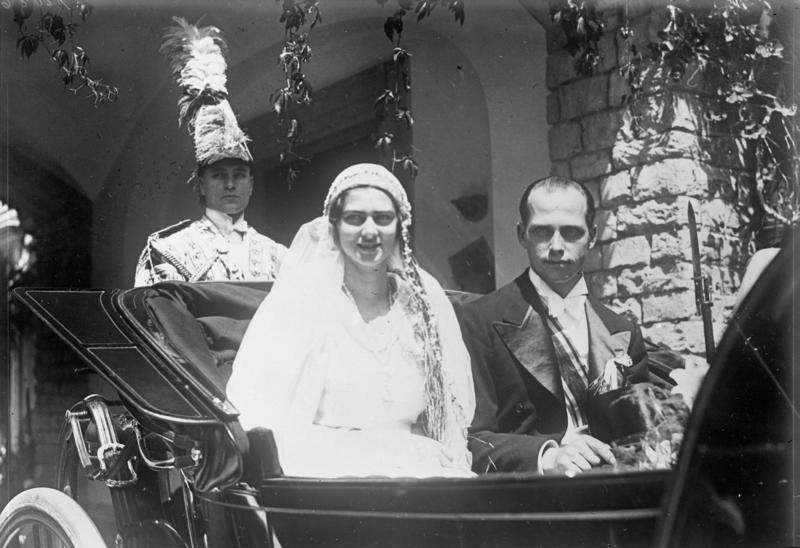
July 26, 1931: Royal wedding in Romania joins Princess Ileana of Romania and Archduke Anton of Habsburg-Bourbon

The following events occurred in July 1931:

== July 1, 1931 (Wednesday) ==
- Wiley Post and Harold Gatty completed their round-the-world flight in a record 8 days 16 hours.
- The east-west Trans-African Railroad was completed, connecting the Atlantic coastal city of Lobito in Portuguese Angola to Tenke in the Katanga Province of the Belgian Congo, which in turn provided access to the north-south Cape to Cairo Railway.
- Born:
  - Leslie Caron, French-born American film and TV actress known for the title role in the 1958 comedy Gigi; in Boulogne-sur-Seine
  - Seyni Kountché, President of Niger from 1974 to 1987 after overthrowing President Hamani Diori in a coup in 1974; in Damana Fandou (died of a brain tumor, 1987)
  - Marilyn Hickey, American televangelist, in Dalhart, Texas

== July 2, 1931 (Thursday) ==
- A fistfight broke out in the British House of Commons. It began when Labour MP John McGovern criticized the arrest of two Scottish preachers for holding meetings on the Glasgow Green without permits. McGovern refused to sit down when he was not satisfied with the Secretary of Scotland's reply, and remained standing even after being suspended. A half dozen attendants arrived and tried to pull McGovern out of the chamber by force, but they were attacked by three Labour MPs, James Maxton, John Beckett and John Kinley, and opposing MPs joined in. Proceedings were suspended for 19 minutes and the fight lasted until McGovern was finally dragged out of the chamber.
- New York City gave Wiley Post and Harold Gatty a ticker tape parade.
- Born: Robert Ito, Canadian-born TV actor known for Quincy, M.E.; in Vancouver
- Died:
  - Harry C. Beasley, 41, United States Navy seaman and Medal of Honor recipient, was shot and killed in the line of duty as a Newark, Ohio, police officer.
  - Peter Kürten, 48, German serial killer, was executed by guillotine after being convicted on nine counts of murder in the city of Düsseldorf.

== July 3, 1931 (Friday) ==
- Max Schmeling knocked out Young Stribling in the fifteenth round at Cleveland Municipal Stadium to retain the world heavyweight boxing title.
- The Kroll Opera House closed its doors after a final performance of Mozart's The Marriage of Figaro.
- Cilly Aussem defeated Hilde Krahwinkel Sperling in an all-German Ladies' Singles final at Wimbledon.

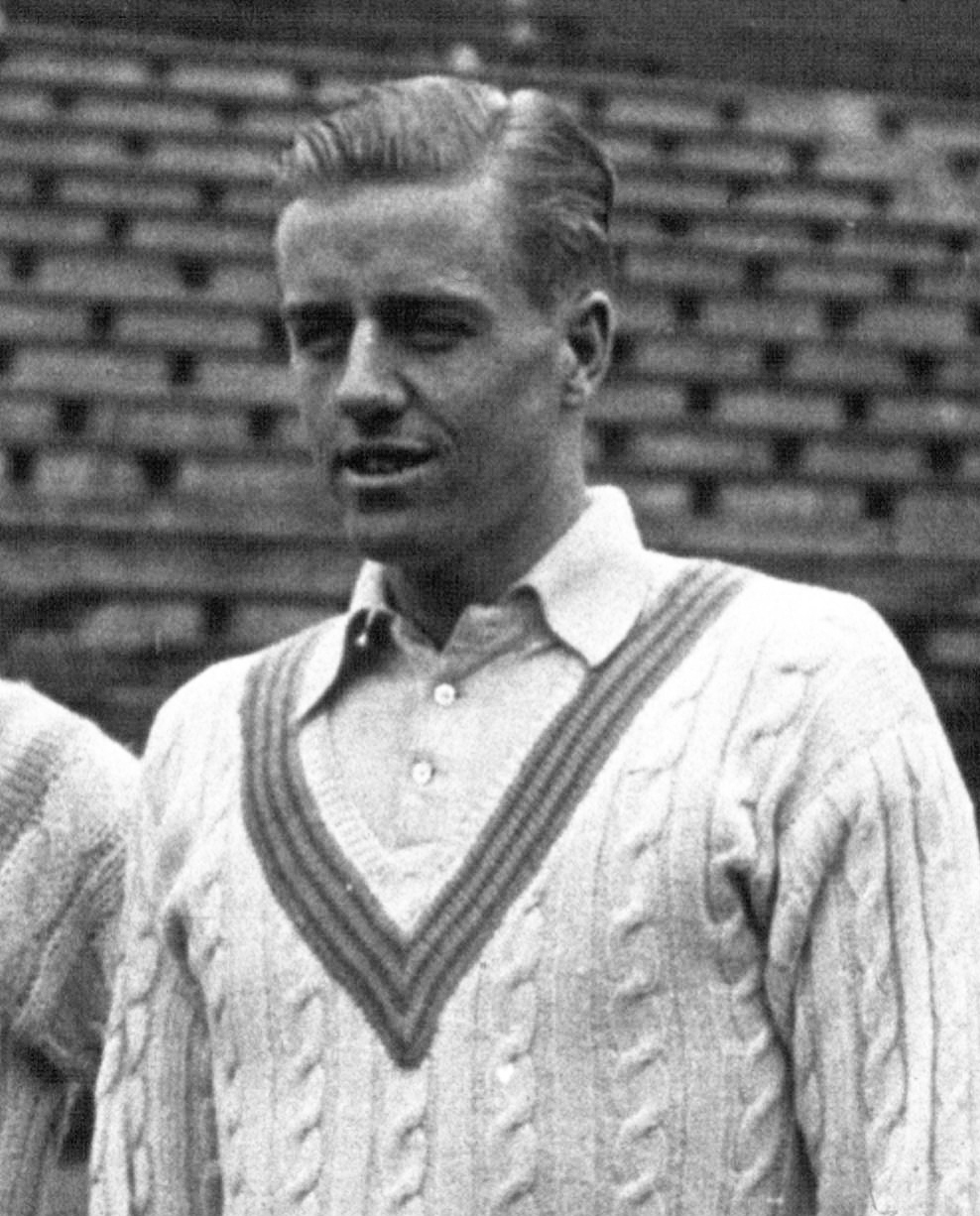
Wood, champion by default

- Sidney Wood was declared the men's champion at Wimbledon by walkover when Frank Shields pulled out of the final due to a leg injury. Shields had wanted to play, but the U.S. Tennis Association ordered him to forfeit so he would be ready for the Davis Cup.

== July 4, 1931 (Saturday) ==
- A monument to Woodrow Wilson sculpted by Gutzon Borglum was unveiled in Poznań, Poland in the presence of Edith Wilson and President Ignacy Mościcki. It was destroyed by the Nazis in 1939 but a different Wilson monument stands today in Poznań in a park named for Wilson.
- The British cruisers HMS Dorsetshire and HMS Norfolk docked in the port of Kiel as part of Kiel Week, the first time British warships visited Germany since July 1914.
- Born: Stephen Boyd (stage name for William Millar), Northern Irish film actor, in Glengormley, County Antrim (died of a heart attack, 1977)
- Died:
  - The Duke of Aosta, 62, field marshal and Commander of the Italian Third Army during World War I
  - Buddie Petit (stage name for Joseph Crawford), 41, American jazz cornetist

== July 5, 1931 (Sunday) ==
- A marble memorial to Gustav Stresemann was unveiled in Mainz. Foreign Minister Julius Curtius spoke at the ceremony, which was briefly interrupted by a Nazi who jumped up to the microphone and shouted "Germany awake!" before being arrested.
- Anti-Chinese rioting occurred in Pyongyang. Approximately 127 Chinese people were killed, 393 wounded, and a considerable number of properties were destroyed by Korean residents.
- Born: Ismail Mahomed, Chief Justice of South Africa, in Pretoria (d. 2000)

== July 6, 1931 (Monday) ==
- Billy Burke won the U.S. Open golf tournament.
- Rudy Vallée was secretly married in West Orange, New Jersey to actress Fay Webb.
- Born:
  - Della Reese (stage name Delloreese Early), American film and TV actress, jazz and gospel music singer, in Detroit (d. 2017)
  - Robert Dunham, American-born actor in Japanese films; in Portland, Maine (d. 2001)

== July 7, 1931 (Tuesday) ==
- Seven Nazis were arrested in Kiel for violent public disorder.
- Born: David Eddings, fantasy author, in Spokane, Washington (d. 2009)

== July 8, 1931 (Wednesday) ==
- The German Communist Party newspaper The Red Flag was banned until July 21 for insulting the Berlin police.

== July 9, 1931 (Thursday) ==
- U.S. Secretary of State Henry L. Stimson met with Italian dictator Benito Mussolini in Rome to discuss peace and disarmament.
- Mussolini decreed that no Italian could simultaneously be a member of the National Fascist Party and Azione Cattolica.
- At Lake Garda, Kaye Don set a new water speed record of 110.22 mph in the Miss England II.
- The Landtag of the German state of Prussia approved the removal of the book All Quiet on the Western Front from school libraries.

== July 10, 1931 (Friday) ==
- A Norwegian royal proclamation was issued claiming the uninhabited part of eastern Greenland as Erik the Red's Land.
- Outdoor political rallies were banned in Bavaria due to frequent violence.
- Born:
  - Alice Munro, Canadian short-story author and 2013 Nobel Prize in Literature laureate; in Wingham, Ontario, Canada (d. 2024)
  - Nick Adams (stage name for Nicholas Adamshock), American TV actor known for starring in the ABC western The Rebel; in Nanticoke, Pennsylvania (died of prescription drug overdose, 1968)
- Died: F. W. Fitzpatrick, 68, Canadian-born American architect known for his advocacy of fireproofing buildings, died after being struck by a car

== July 11, 1931 (Saturday) ==
- British Prime Minister Ramsay MacDonald and former PMs David Lloyd George and Stanley Baldwin made a plea for disarmament in an international radio address from Royal Albert Hall in London.
- The 58,000-seat Ernst-Happel-Stadion opened in Vienna, Austria.
- The drama film Smart Money, starring Edward G. Robinson and James Cagney, was released.
- Born: Tab Hunter (stage name for Arthur Kelm), American film actor and singer, in New York City (d. 2018)

== July 12, 1931 (Sunday) ==
- In a baseball game against the Philadelphia Phillies, Mel Ott of the New York Giants hit his 100th career home run at the age of 22 years and 132 days. This still stands as the major league record for the youngest player to hit 100 homers.
- The German government shut down the Nazi newspaper Völkischer Beobachter for three weeks.
- Died: Nathan Söderblom, 65, Swedish clergyman

== July 13, 1931 (Monday) ==
- The Danatbank in Germany failed, causing a run on all other leading banks in the country.
- The German government issued an emergency decree through Article 48 ordering all banks in the country closed down for 48 hours. The German stock market was also shut down and ended up not reopening until September.

== July 14, 1931 (Tuesday) ==
- The Hungarian government ordered all banks closed until Friday to protect Hungary from the German financial crisis.
- The first Republican Cortes Generales opened in Spain.

== July 15, 1931 (Wednesday) ==
- Communists and police clashed all over Germany in unemployment demonstrations.
- Born: Clive Cussler, novelist and archaeologist, in Aurora, Illinois (d. 2020)
- Died: Ladislaus Bortkiewicz, 65, Russian economist

== July 16, 1931 (Thursday) ==
- Banks throughout Germany reopened. The only withdrawals that were allowed were for shopkeepers to meet payrolls, and foreign currency exchanges were prohibited.
- Haile Selassie introduced a constitution for Ethiopia.
- In Rome, a bomb was discovered at St. Peter's Basilica by a janitor. It was moved to a nearby meadow where it exploded at 2 o'clock Friday morning.
- Born: Mighty Igor (ring name for Richard Garza), American professional wrestler, in Dearborn, Michigan (d. 2002)
- Died:
  - Mary Foote Henderson, 88, American author and social activist
  - Charles Studd, 70, English Test cricketer, later a Christian missionary, died in the Belgian Congo

== July 17, 1931 (Friday) ==
- An accident occurred on the set of the film Scarface when some dynamite caps exploded prematurely, injuring four actors and bystander Gaylord Lloyd (Harold Lloyd's brother), who was struck in the right eye.
- Died: Dr. Nicolae Paulescu, 61, Romanian physiologist who patented the early diabetes treatment pancreine, an extract from the processing of insulin from cattle pancreas

== July 18, 1931 (Saturday) ==
- The German government issued several new decrees aimed at making foreign currency more difficult to acquire. A special visa was introduced that every German intending to cross the border was required to obtain for a fee of 100 Reichsmarks.
- Died: Hermann Hendrich, 76, German painter

== July 19, 1931 (Sunday) ==
- Eleven people were killed in Bangalore, and 200 wounded, when police in British India fired into a crowd of demonstrators at the Binny Mills.

== July 20, 1931 (Monday) ==
- A conference of seven powers (Great Britain, the United States, France, Italy, Japan, Belgium and Germany) met in London to discuss the economic situation in Germany.
- The Royal Mail Case trial began at the Old Bailey. The director of the Royal Mail Steam Packet Company, Lord Kylsant, was accused of publishing a fraudulent balance sheet.
- Died: Herbert Baddeley, 59, British tennis player and four-time winner of the men's doubles at Wimbledon (in 1891, 1894, 1895 and 1896)

== July 21, 1931 (Tuesday) ==
- The Heywood Broun-produced musical Shoot the Works opened at George M. Cohan's Theatre on Broadway. Broun himself sang, danced and acted in the show.
- Born: Gene Fullmer, American professional boxer, world middleweight champion in 1957, 1959 to 1962; in West Jordan, Utah (d. 2015)

== July 22, 1931 (Wednesday) ==
- Acting Governor of Bombay Sir Ernest Hotson survived an assassination attempt at Fergusson College in Pune. The first of two shots fired at point blank deflected off a metal stud on his clothes
- Mickey Walker and Jack Sharkey boxed to a 15-round draw at Ebbetts Field in Brooklyn.

== July 23, 1931 (Thursday) ==
- The London Conference broke off with little accomplished other than producing a request to world bankers to maintain their existing short-term credits to Germany.
- The United Kingdom transferred sovereignty over the uninhabited Ashmore and Cartier Islands to Australia, effective May 10, 1934. The islands are the highest point on the Ashmore Reef and the Cartier Reef. The largest of them, West Island on the Ashmore Reef, has an area of 230 acres (93 ha) at low tide.
- Born:
  - Te Atairangikaahu, the elected Queen of the Māori people of New Zealand's North Island from 1966 until her death 40 years later; in Huntly, New Zealand (d. 2006)
  - Arata Isozaki, Japanese architecter, urban designer, and theorist, award for Royal Gold Medal (1986), Venice Biennale of Architecture (1986) and Pritzker Architecture Prize (2019), in Ōita City, Kyushu Island, Japan.(d. 2022)

== July 24, 1931 (Friday) ==
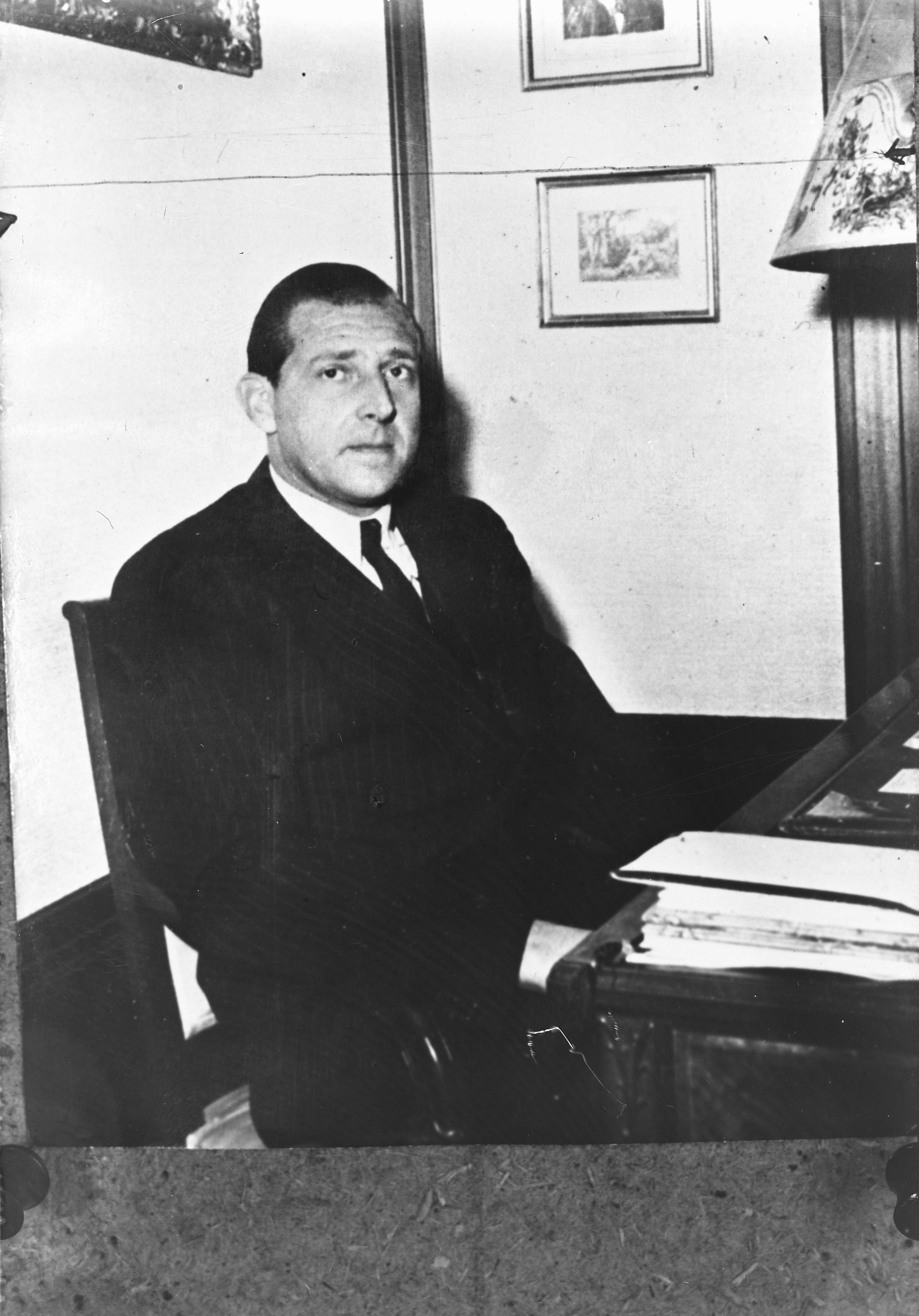
Son of a King, father of a King, but never the King of Spain

- Living in exile in France in Fontainebleau, King Alfonso XIII of Spain abdicated and passed the right to the throne to his third son, 18-year-old Don Juan de Borbón. Don Juan, the Count of Barcelona, was later the father of King Juan Carlos I, but would never serve as Spain's monarch.
- In Helsinki, Paavo Nurmi ran two miles in 8 minutes 59.6 seconds, setting a new world record.
- The Paul Abraham operetta The Flower of Hawaii premiered at the Neues Theater in Leipzig.

== July 25, 1931 (Saturday) ==
- The German government announced the formation of a new bank, the "Acceptance and Guarantee Bank", which would make reserve cash available to all banks to assure them of money to meet possible bank runs.

== July 26, 1931 (Sunday) ==
- Delegates to the annual convention of the International Bible Students Association, meeting in Columbus, Ohio, voted unanimously to approve the resolution their president, J. F. Rutherford to change the name of the organization to Jehovah's Witnesses, based on Isaiah 43:10 in the Bible. The organization now has 8.7 million members worldwide.
- Carlos Ibáñez del Campo resigned as President of Chile following three days of rioting by citizens who were preparing to call a general strike in opposition to his rule.
- Princess Ileana of Romania, sister of King Carol II, married Archduke Anton of Habsburg-Bourbon, a pretender to the throne of Spain, in the Peleș Castle, the summer residence of Romanian monarchs, in Sinaia.
- Antonin Magne of France won the Tour de France.
- Born:
  - Fred Foster, songwriter, record producer and founder of Monument Records, in Rutherford County, North Carolina (d. 2019)
  - John Africa, the founder of MOVE, a Philadelphia-based, predominantly black organization active from the early 1970s to the present (killed in fire in 1985)

== July 27, 1931 (Monday) ==
- Ramsay MacDonald became the first British Prime Minister to visit Berlin since the end of World War I. "We are filled with admiration for Germany and we are firmly convinced that if she continues her efforts, if she asserts all her intellectual, moral and economic powers to get on her feet again, without giving way to despair, other nations will help her and not suffer her to go under", MacDonald said.
- Juan Esteban Montero became President of Chile.
- Born: Jerry Van Dyke, American comedian and TV actor; in Danville, Illinois (d. 2018)

== July 28, 1931 (Tuesday) ==
- Otto Dietrich was appointed Press Chief of the Nazi Party.
- 24-year-old Don Orcutt was killed in a climbing accident on Cathedral Mountain at Zion National Park in the U.S. state of Utah.
- Died: George Wells Parker, 48, African-American political activist and co-founder of the Hamitic League of the World
- Born: Darryl Hickman, American actor, screenwriter, television executive, and acting coach (d. 2024)

== July 29, 1931 (Wednesday) ==
- George Bernard Shaw met Joseph Stalin in Moscow.
- All England waited anxiously for news of David Lloyd George as he underwent an operation for hematuria.
- Born: Mr. Food (stage name for Art Ginsburg), American television chef and cookbook author, in Troy, New York (d. 2012)

== July 30, 1931 (Thursday) ==
- The trial in the Royal Mail Case ended with Lord Kylsant being sentenced to a year in prison.

== July 31, 1931 (Friday) ==
- Arriving in Warsaw after his visit to the Soviet Union, George Bernard Shaw said that other countries must follow the USSR's "remarkable example", saying, "Unlike the western politicians, who are working for their own benefit, the Russian rulers are working for the people and for their country. I am a confirmed communist, as I was before Lenin, and even more so after seeing communist Russia. Talk of forced labour in Russia is rubbish. There is more slavery in other countries." Shaw also described Stalin as "a most honest and able man."
- The Peruvian football club Defensor Lima was founded.
