= September 1931 =

Month of 1931

<<	September 1931					>>
Su	Mo	Tu	We	Th	Fr	Sa
		1	2	3	4	5
6	7	8	9	10	11	12
13	14	15	16	17	18	19
20	21	22	23	24	25	26
27	28	29	30

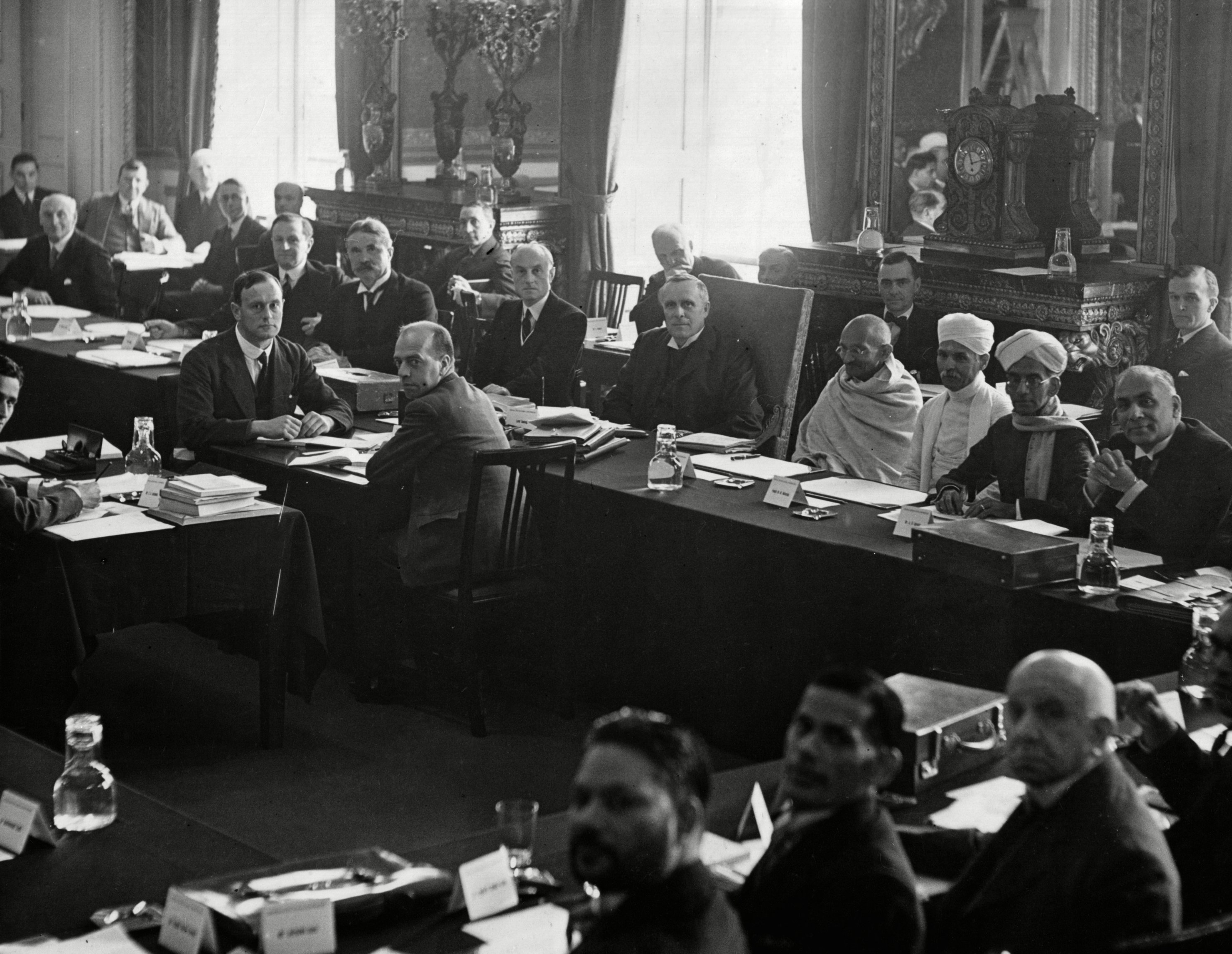
September 14, 1931: British Prime Minister MacDonald and the Indian independence activist Mohandas Gandhi convene the second round of Round Table Discussions in London

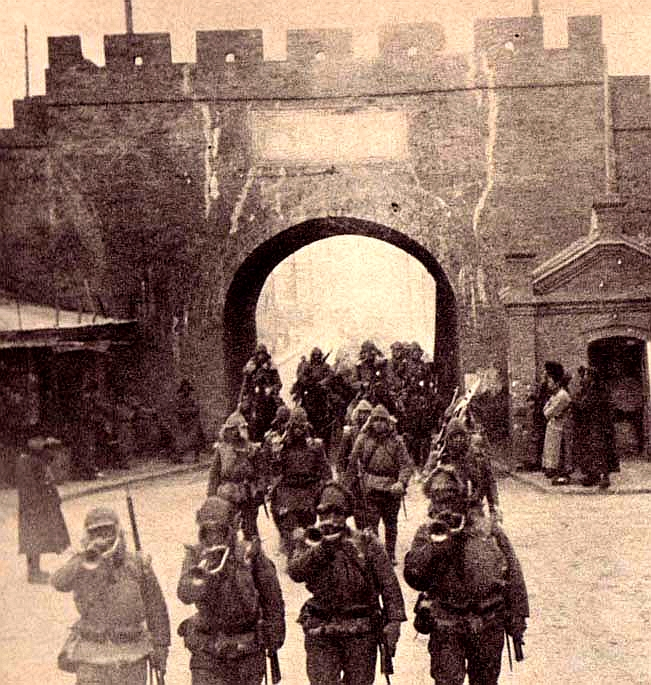
September 18, 1931: Japanese troops begin invasion of Chinese region of Manchuria

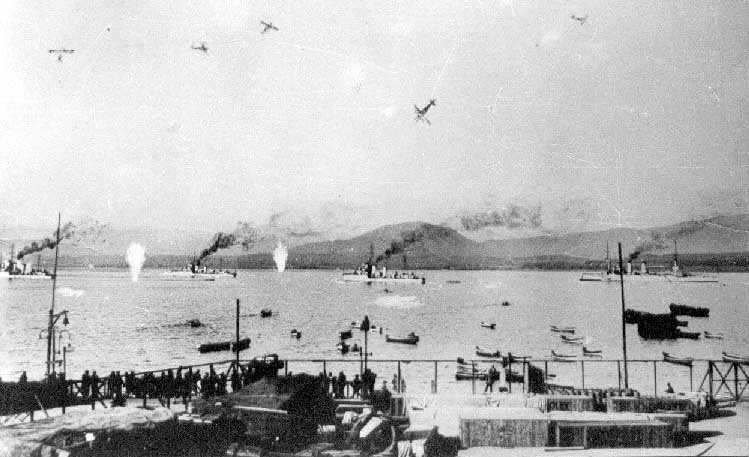
September 6, 1931: Rebel Chilean Navy ships bombed by Chile's warplanes

The following events occurred in September 1931:

== September 1, 1931 (Tuesday) ==
- A mutiny broke out among sailors and officers in the Chilean Navy when crews stationed at the port of Coquimbo revolted against proposed reductions in salaries.
- In a suburb of Havana at 2:20 in the morning, a large bomb exploded at the branch of the Royal Bank of Canada. The blast caused several thousand dollars' worth of damage.
- Born:
  - Cecil Parkinson, English politician; in Carnforth (d. 2016)
  - Javier Solís, Mexican singer and actor, in Tacubaya, Mexico City (d. 1966)

== September 2, 1931 (Wednesday) ==
- The Italian government announced a surprise agreement with the Vatican allowing Azione Cattolica to operate as long as it abstained from politics and did not compete with the interests of the state in any way.
- The Chilean cabinet resigned over the naval mutiny crisis.
- 15 Minutes with Bing Crosby debuted on the CBS radio network.

== September 3, 1931 (Thursday) ==
- King Alexander I of Yugoslavia proclaimed the Yugoslav Constitution by decree. The new Constitution provided powers to the King as both head of state and commander-in-chief of the Yugoslavian armed forces, with power to dissolve Parliament with approval of the cabinet.
- The German stock exchange reopened for the first time since being shut on July 13.
- The P. G. Wodehouse novel If I Were You was first published.

== September 4, 1931 (Friday) ==
- Jimmy Doolittle set a new transcontinental flight record of 11 hours 15 minutes.
- Born: Mitzi Gaynor (stage name for Francesca von Gerber), American film actress and dancer; in Chicago (d. 2024)

== September 5, 1931 (Saturday) ==
- The Chilean military attacked the mutinous naval base of Talcahuano.
- By an 8–7 vote the World Court ruled that the Austro-German customs agreement violated the 1922 Protocol for the reconstruction of Austria.

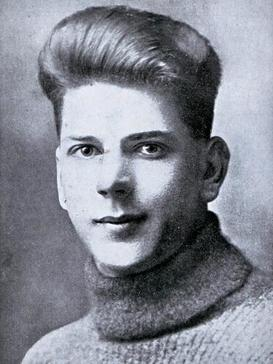
Goalkeeper Thomson

- Died: John Thomson, the 22-year-old goalkeeper for the Scottish soccer football team Celtic, was fatally injured during a match against Rangers at Ibrox Stadium in Glasgow. Thomson, the goalkeeper, was diving for the ball while Rangers striker Sam English was moving forward; Thomson fractured his skull and ruptured an artery on the right side of his brain when he collided with English's knee. Thomson died hours later after being taken to Victoria Infirmary.

== September 6, 1931 (Sunday) ==
- The Chilean Air Force bombed rebel warships at Coquimbo.
- Hack Wilson was suspended by the Chicago Cubs for the rest of the season for "failure to observe training rules".

== September 7, 1931 (Monday) ==
- The Chilean mutineers surrendered.
- King George V opted to take a pay cut of £50,000 a year for as long as the depression lasted.

== September 8, 1931 (Tuesday) ==
- Ramsay MacDonald's First National ministry passed its first test in the British House of Commons, winning a vote of confidence 309–250. The Labour Party voted solidly against the new government.
- Born: Jack Rosenthal, English playwright and TV screenwriter; in Cheetham Hill, Manchester (d. 2004)

== September 9, 1931 (Wednesday) ==
- Ramsay MacDonald's government won a vote of cloture 306–212 to cut off debate about its emergency economic bill.

== September 10, 1931 (Thursday) ==
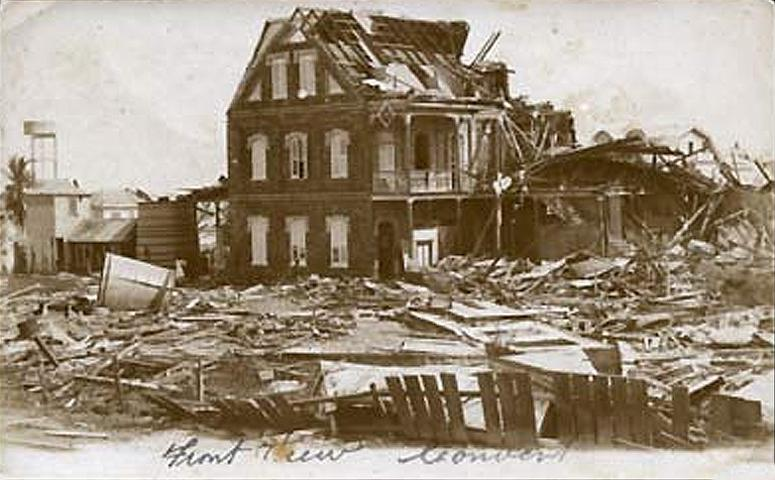
Damage in Belize City

- A hurricane struck British Honduras, killing at least 2,500 people and leveling St. John's College in Belize City.
- Born: Philip Baker Hall, American character actor; in Toledo, Ohio (d. 2022)
- Died: Salvatore Maranzano, 45, Sicilian-born American mob boss who founded, and was capo di tutti i capi of, the "Five Families" of the American Mafia in New York City. Maranzano was shot to death at the New York Central Building by four gangsters hired by Lucky Luciano, whom Maranzano had targeted for killing.

== September 11, 1931 (Friday) ==
- Britain put the R100 airship up for sale due to lack of funds.

== September 12, 1931 (Saturday) ==
- Mexico was admitted to the League of Nations.
- The Mahatma Gandhi arrived in London to attend the Round Table Conference on Indian independence. He took a small room at Kingsley Hall in the city's East End.
- Born:
  - Ian Holm (stage name for Ian Holm Cuthbert), English stage and film actor and Tony Award winner and BAFTA Award winner; in Goodmayes, Essex (d. 2020)
  - George Jones, popular American country musician, in Saratoga, Texas (d. 2013)
- Died: U.S. Navy Rear Admiral Francis J. Higginson, 88, veteran of the American Civil War and the Spanish-American War, and the first commander of the North Atlantic Fleet

== September 13, 1931 (Sunday) ==
- Twenty-two people were killed by a bomb that had been planted in a viaduct near the town of Biatorbágy in Hungary. Authorities initially blamed Bulgarian Communists, but a mentally disturbed man by the name of Szilveszter Matuska was later convicted of the crime.
- Austrian troops put down a Heimwehr revolt in the province of Styria.
- Great Britain won the Schneider Trophy as Flight Lieutenant George Stainforth set a new seaplane speed record of 386.1 mph.

== September 14, 1931 (Monday) ==
- The second Round Table Conference on Indian independence opened in London.

== September 15, 1931 (Tuesday) ==
- The Invergordon Mutiny began at the Scottish port of Invergordon when 1,000 sailors of the Royal Navy's Atlantic Fleet started refusing orders in protest against pay cuts.
- The Philadelphia Athletics clinched their third straight American League pennant with a 14–3 victory over the Cleveland Indians.

== September 16, 1931 (Wednesday) ==
- The gangland killing known as the Collingwood Manor Massacre occurred in Detroit with the contract killing of three gunmen of The Purple Gang who had been invited by Ray Bernstein to attend a meeting at the Collingwood Manor Apartments.
- The Texas Senate passed a resolution calling Louisiana Governor Huey Long a "consummate liar" for his statement that the Texas legislature had been bought off.
- The Invergordon Mutiny ended when the British government made some concessions.
- The St. Louis Cardinals clinched the National League pennant when the second-place New York Giants were eliminated by losing 7–3 to the Cincinnati Reds.

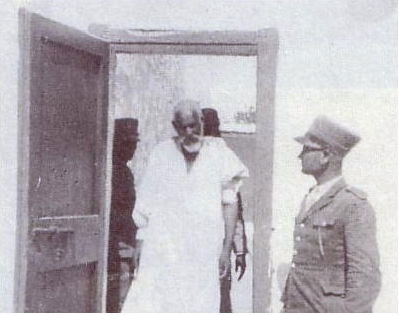
Mukhtar, shortly before his trial and execution

- Died: Omar Mukhtar, 73, Libyan revolutionary who led the Libyan resistance movement against Italian colonial authorities in Cyrenaica, was hanged five days after being wounded and captured in battle

== September 17, 1931 (Thursday) ==
- RCA Victor introduced the LP record in a demonstration at the Savoy-Plaza Hotel in New York. However, the long playing discs were too expensive at the time to be commercially successful.
- Karlag, one of the largest forced labour camps in the Soviet Union, was established in the Kazakh SSR.
- Born: Anne Bancroft (stage name for Anna Maria Italiano), American stage, film and TV actress best known for The Miracle Worker, winner of two Tony Awards, an Academy Award, and two Emmy Awards; in the Bronx, New York City (d. 2005)
- Died:
  - Marvin Hart, 55, American heavyweight boxing champion, world champion 1905 to 1906; from a stroke
  - Marcello Amero D'Aste, 78, Admiral of the Royal Italian Navy and the Regia Marina Commander-in-Chief during World War One

== September 18, 1931 (Friday) ==
- The Mukden Incident, staged by Japanese military personnel in the Chinese region of Manchuria, took place when an officer of the 29th Japanese Infantry exploded a small bomb on the tracks of the Japanese-owned South Manchuria Railway near the city of Mukden (now Shenyang). Japan's Imperial Army then accused Chinese dissidents of attempting to sabotage the railway and invaded the city the next day with the goal of eventually annexing Manchuria.
- Died: Geli Raubal, 23, half-niece of Adolf Hitler and his girlfriend, committed suicide at Hitler's Munich apartment, shooting herself in the chest with a pistol owned by him.

== September 19, 1931 (Saturday) ==
- The Japanese invasion of Manchuria began as a Japanese Army unit fired artillery shells at a Chinese Army garrison at Beidaying on the pretext of retaliation for the bomb explosion at the South Manchuria Railway the night before. By the end of the day, 500 Japanese troops had taken control of the city. The Japanese also occupied the city of Mukden.
- In Clarksburg, West Virginia, an angry mob of 10,000 people tried to storm the county jail to get at accused murderer Harry Powers. Police fired tear gas to bring the crowd under control. Powers would be convicted of killing an Illinois woman and her three children, and hanged at the West Virginia State Penitentiary on March 18.
- Died: David Starr Jordan, 80, American ichthyologist and university administrator who served as the first president of Stanford University and later as the president of Indiana University

== September 20, 1931 (Sunday) ==
- Britain's government abandoned the gold standard as the basis for the value of the pound sterling.
- Died: Joan Beauchamp Procter, 34, English zoologist and herpetologist, died of cancer

== September 21, 1931 (Monday) ==
- The British emergency measure to suspend the gold standard was rushed through the House of Commons and House of Lords and granted royal assent all in the same day.
- The German stock exchange was closed again. It would not reopen until April 1932.
- Born:
  - Larry Hagman, American television actor known for Dallas and I Dream of Jeannie; in Fort Worth, Texas (d. 2012)
  - Gloria Cordes, baseball pitcher and twice all-star for the AAGPBL in 1952 and 1954; in Staten Island, New York City (d. 2018)

== September 22, 1931 (Tuesday) ==
- Charlie Chaplin paid his respects to the Mahatma Gandhi in Canning Town, London.
- Born:
  - Fay Weldon, English novelist; in Birmingham (d. 2023)
  - George Younger, 4th Viscount Younger of Leckie, Scottish banker, politician, and British Secretary of State for Defence from 1986 to 1989; in Stirling, Stirlingshire (d. 2003)

== September 23, 1931 (Wednesday) ==
- The Soviet Union notified Japan of its disapproval of the Japanese invasion of Manchuria. Foreign Affairs Comissar Maxim Litvinov told the Japanese minister that the Soviet government was displeased at not being informed ahead of time and that the conflict could have been settled through compromise.
- Died: Asger Ostenfeld, 64, Danish civil engineer and expert on steel structural construction

== September 24, 1931 (Thursday) ==
- Japan told the League of Nations that it would begin to withdraw troops from Manchuria if the safety of Japanese residents in the area and their property was guaranteed.
- Born: Anthony Newley, English pop singer and later a film lyricist (d. 1999)

== September 25, 1931 (Friday) ==
- The Mahatma Gandhi visited the Lancashire cotton mills. Despite the Indian boycott damaging the British textile industry, Gandhi was cheered by workers.
- Scotland Yard raided the offices of the Daily Worker, the newspaper of the Communist Party of Great Britain, due to articles printed the week before about the Invergordon Mutiny.
- Born: Peggy Connelly, American singer and actress, in Shreveport, Louisiana (d. 2007)
- Died: Aleksander Skrzyński, 49, Prime Minister of the Second Polish Republic for six months in 1925 and 1926, was killed in a car accident

== September 26, 1931 (Saturday) ==
- A printer of the Daily Worker was brought into police court and charged with inciting mutiny.
- The film Five Star Final starring Edward G. Robinson was released.
- The comedy film Sidewalks of New York starring Buster Keaton was released.
- Died:
  - Albert Capellani, 57, French film director and screenwriter
  - Harry Macdonough (stage name for John Scantlebury Macdonald), 60, Canadian recording artist and singer whose works were among the first best-selling phonograph records; later a recording executive for Columbia Records

== September 27, 1931 (Sunday) ==
- Following the decision by the United Kingdom, Norway, Sweden and Egypt all abandoned the gold standard.
- In local elections in Hamburg, the Social Democratic Party of Germany narrowly edged out the Nazi Party, winning 46 seats to the NSDAP's 43.

== September 28, 1931 (Monday) ==
- France and Germany created a new trade commission to improve trade relations between the two countries.
- Denmark abandoned the gold standard.
- The Prague Zoo was opened.
- Born: John Gilmore, American jazz saxophonist, in Summit, Mississippi (d. 1995)
- Died: Earl Little, 41, father of Malcolm X

== September 29, 1931 (Tuesday) ==
- George Stainforth broke his own speed record by flying an airplane at 408.8 mph.
- The British Ministry of Labour reported record unemployment, with 2.8 million people out of work. On the same day, huge crowds of unemployed workers poured into Westminster to protest. Many arrests were made as the demonstrators clashed with mounted police.
- The Estevan Riot occurred in Estevan, Saskatchewan between the Royal Canadian Mounted Police and striking coal miners.
- Born:
  - James Cronin, American nuclear physicist and 1980 Nobel laureate, in Chicago, Illinois (d. 2016)
  - Anita Ekberg, Swedish-born Italian film actress and model; in Malmö (d. 2015)

== September 30, 1931 (Wednesday) ==
- London police clashed again with unemployed workers outside the Bow Street police station and Magistrates' Court where those arrested in last night's disturbances were being tried.
- Mahatma Gandhi met with Prime Minister MacDonald in London.
- The British government that the pound sterling had lost 20% of its value in 10 days following its abandonment of the gold standard.
- The film Alice in Wonderland, the first talking screen adaptation of the Lewis Carroll novel Alice's Adventures in Wonderland, was released.
- Born:
  - Angie Dickinson, American film and television actress known for Rio Bravo and the NBC series Police Woman; as Angeline Brown, in Kulm, North Dakota
  - Wesley L. Fox, U.S. Marine Corps officer and Medal of Honor recipient, in Herndon, Virginia (d. 2017)
- Died: Henry C. Warmoth, 89, officer for the Union Army in the American Civil War who was elected Governor of Louisiana in 1868 at the age of 26 during the Reconstruction Era
