= June 1931 =

Month of 1931

<<	June 1931					>>
Su	Mo	Tu	We	Th	Fr	Sa
	1	2	3	4	5	6
7	8	9	10	11	12	13
14	15	16	17	18	19	20
21	22	23	24	25	26	27
28	29	30

The following events occurred in June 1931:

== Monday, June 1, 1931 ==
- The United States Supreme Court decided Near v. Minnesota.
- The Spanish provisional government eliminated all titles of nobility.
- Fascist Italy banned Catholic youth organizations.

== Tuesday, June 2, 1931 ==
- The British House of Commons approved a law abolishing the death penalty for pregnant women and replacing it with life imprisonment.
- Born: Larry Jackson, baseball player, in Nampa, Idaho (d. 1990)
- Died: Joseph W. Farnham, 46, American playwright, screenwriter and film editor

== Wednesday, June 3, 1931 ==
- Cameronian won The Derby horse race. It was the first Epsom Derby to be televised.
- Salvador Dalí opened his second solo exhibition at the Pierre Colle Gallery in Paris. It was at this show that the painting destined to become his most famous, The Persistence of Memory, was publicly displayed for the first time.
- Born:
  - Raúl Castro, the de facto leader of Cuba from 2011 to 2021 after succeeding his brother Fidel Castro as First Secretary of the Communist Party of Cuba, head of government as President of Cuba from 2006 to 2018; in Birán
  - Carmen Dell'Orefice, American supermodel, in New York City
  - Lindy Remigino, U.S. track and field athlete and 1952 Olympic gold medalist in the 100 meter race; in Elmhurst, Queens, New York (d. 2018)

== Thursday, June 4, 1931 ==
- The Spanish provisional government issued a decree declaring 1,600 churches and castles to be "historical and artistic monuments belonging to the nation's artistic treasures" that could not be disposed of or altered without government approval.
- Berlin Police President Albert Grzesinski banned the Nazi newspaper Der Angriff for a month for violating the emergency decree of March 28.
- Died: Hussein bin Ali, Sharif of Mecca, 77, King of the Hejaz from 1916 to 1924.

== Friday, June 5, 1931 ==
- German Chancellor Heinrich Brüning and Foreign Minister Julius Curtius arrived in England on an official visit. Brüning warned Prime Minister Ramsay MacDonald that due to the Austrian banking crisis, the German banking system was itself at risk of complete collapse.
- Al Capone was indicted for tax evasion.
- Germany passed an emergency decree attempting to balance the budget by implementing new austerity measures. Unemployment benefits were cut by 5%.
- Jules Renkin became Prime Minister of Belgium.
- Scottish-American Tommy Armour won the Open Championship golf tournament.
- Born: David Browning, United States Olympic diver and Naval Aviator; in Boston, Massachusetts (d. 1956)

== Saturday, June 6, 1931 ==
- Al Capone's Miami home was seized by Florida deputy sheriffs on an attachment writ for attorney's fees.
- The Glass Palace at the Munich Botanical Garden was heavily damaged by fire.
- The Temlag forced labour camp was established in the Mordovian ASSR of the Soviet Union.
- Born: Joan Marshall, film and television actress, in Chicago (d. 1992)

== Sunday, June 7, 1931 ==
- A 6.1 magnitude earthquake struck the United Kingdom at 1:30 in the morning and remains the strongest tremor to affect the UK since measurements were first recorded. The epicenter of the quake was at the Dogger Bank, a shallow offshore sandbank in the North Sea roughly 65 miles (105 km) east of Bridlington, Yorkshire. Damage was minor with a church steeple in the town of Filey being twisted.
- Elections were held for 27 of the 54 seats of the Luxembourg Chamber of Deputies. The Party of the Right won 14 seats to increase its share from 24 to 26, still short of a majority.
- Born: Malcolm Morley, artist, in London, England (d. 2018)

== Monday, June 8, 1931 ==
- A British committee awarded sole ownership of the Wailing Wall to the Muslims, but granted Jews access at all times.
- Born: Dana Wynter, German-born English actress, in Berlin (d. 2011)

== Tuesday, June 9, 1931 ==
- Twenty-one Royal Navy personnel on the British submarine HMS Poseidon were killed after the vessel collided with a Chinese cargo ship off of the coast of Weihai (Port Edward) and sank. Five of the 26 people on Poseidon survived, after being part of a group of eight who were able to use the Davis Submerged Escape Apparatus to escape the forward end of the boat.
- The Italian government sent a note to the Vatican explaining the reasons for the recent banning of Catholic organizations throughout Italy, accusing them of plotting against the government. The note also expressed regret at reports of Fascist violence against the Catholic church, but fell short of the formal apology that the Vatican was seeking.
- Born:
  - Joe Santos (Stage name for Joseph Minieri, Jr.), American film and TV actor, in Brooklyn (d. 2016)
- Died: Henrique Oswald, 79, Brazilian composer and pianist

== Wednesday, June 10, 1931 ==
- Arturo Toscanini was given permission to leave Italy.
- Born: João Gilberto (stage name for João Gilberto de Oliveira), Brazilian bossa nova singer and guitarist; in Juazeiro, Bahia state (d. 2019)

== Thursday, June 11, 1931 ==
- Rioting broke out across Germany in anger at the government's austerity measures.
- Britain's Labour coalition government appeared to be on the verge of collapse when Liberal leader David Lloyd George announced he would not support the proposed land value tax without an amendment.

== Friday, June 12, 1931 ==
- Amelia Earhart crashed in Abilene, Kansas, during an attempt to make the first transcontinental flight in an autogyro, but she and her mechanic were unhurt.

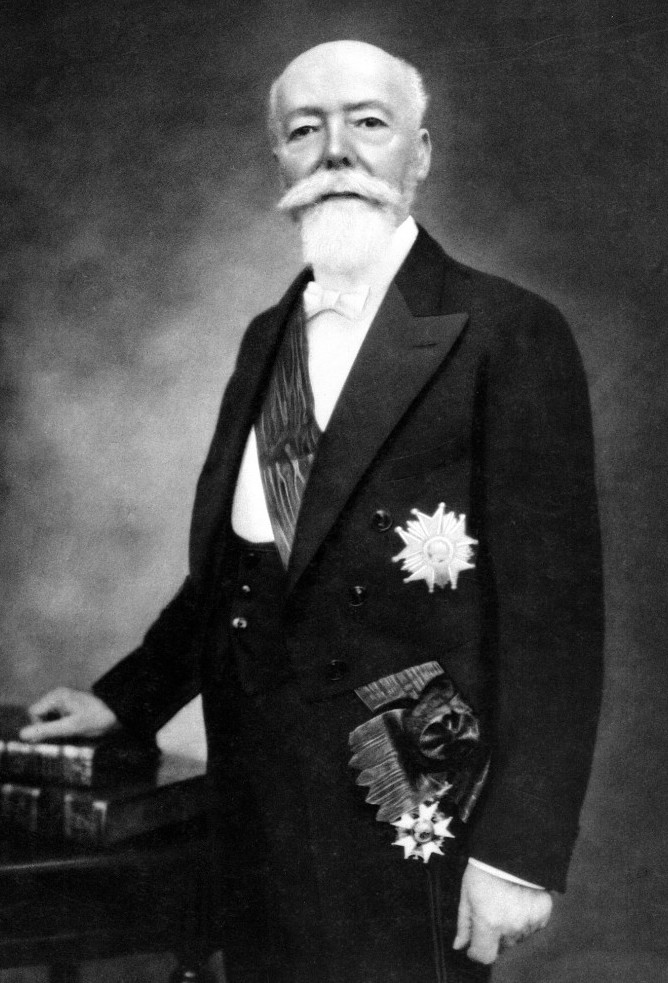
June 13, 1931: Paul Doumer inaugurated as President of France

== Saturday, June 13, 1931 ==
- Twenty Grand won the Belmont Stakes.
- The Ramsay MacDonald government was saved when it agreed to amend the land value tax.
- Paul Doumer took office as President of France.
- Pedro Itriago Chacín became interim president of Venezuela when Juan Bautista Pérez resigned.
- Born: Moysés Baumstein, artist, in São Paulo, Brazil (d. 1991)
- Died: Kitasato Shibasaburō, 78, Japanese physician and bacteriologist

== Sunday, June 14, 1931 ==
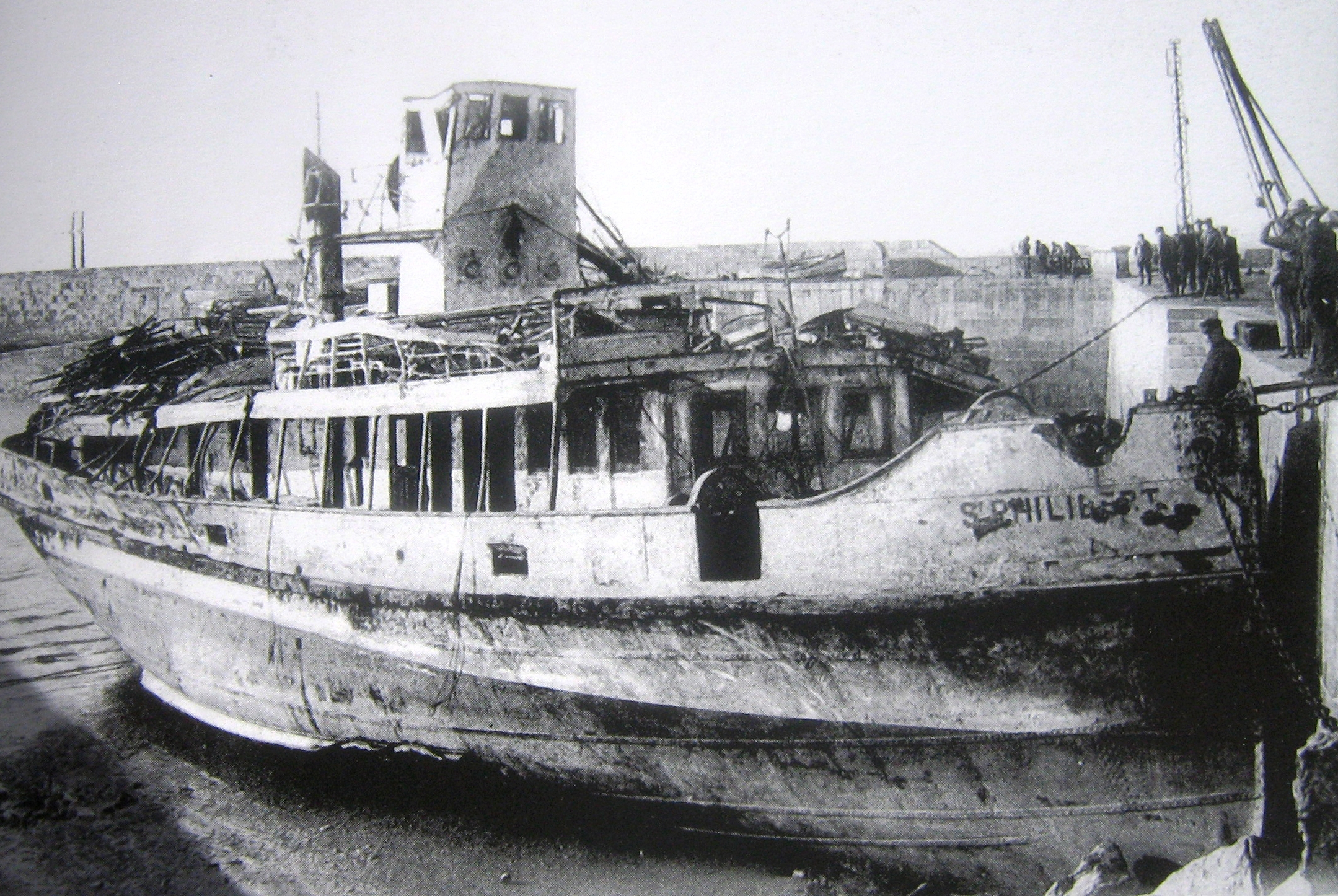
June 14, 1931: More than 500 people drown in capsizing of French excursion boat Saint-Philibert in the Loire River

- More than 500 people drowned in the capsizing of a French tour boat, the Saint-Philibert, when it was toppled in a gale while returning to Nantes from the Île de Noirmoutier. On departure from Nantes, the boat was carrying 467 adult passengers, a seven member crew, and an unknown number of children who were accompanying their families for the excursion. The overloaded Saint-Philibert sank in the Loire river within sight of Saint-Nazaire, and only eight people survived.
- The British team of Lord Howe and Sir Henry Birkin won the Le Mans endurance race.
- Born:
  - Ross Higgins, Australian TV actor and comedian, in Sydney (d. 2016)
  - Marla Gibbs, American TV actress and comedienne; in Chicago
  - Junior Walker (stage name for Autry Mixon Jr.), American saxophonist and singer, in Blytheville, Arkansas (d. 1995)
- Died: Henry L. Williams, 61, American college football coach for the University of Minnesota and College Football Hall of Fame enshrinee

== Monday, June 15, 1931 ==
- Britain's Labour government was defeated in a surprise vote in the House of Commons on a minor amendment in the land tax bill, but it refused to accept the defeat as cause for resignation because many benches were empty. A second vote was called, which the government won by 14 votes.
- Cardinal Pedro Segura y Sáenz was ordered to leave Spain.
- U.S. President Herbert Hoover gave a lengthy speech in Indianapolis on the economy and the government's measures to fight the Depression. "We have come out of each previous depression into a period of prosperity greater than ever before", Hoover said. "We shall do so this time." Hoover said that the "underlying forces of recovery are asserting themselves."
- Died: Anna Adams Gordon, 77, American temperance leader

== Tuesday, June 16, 1931 ==
- The Bank of England extended a loan of 150 million schillings to Austria's central bank Oesterreichische Nationalbank to stem the country's financial crisis.

== Wednesday, June 17, 1931 ==
- The Spanish provisional government received notes of protests from the Vatican and exiled cardinal Pedro Segura y Sáenz, claiming he had been mistreated at the hands of authorities and that only the Vatican had the right to recall a prelate.

== Thursday, June 18, 1931 ==
- Le Journal printed an interview with Benito Mussolini in which he explained his views on the relations between church and state in light of his recent conflicts with the Vatican. Mussolini said that religion was "indispensable", but "[f]or that I let the priests work; that's religion. The rest is politics, and politics – that's me. I will not admit that anybody, absolutely anybody touch in any way that which belongs to the state. My formula is clear – everything within the state, nothing outside the state, nothing against the state."
- Two German professors at the University of Berlin published a paper announcing the invention of a 2.6-million volt X-ray tube, double the power of anything else in the world.
- Born: Fernando Henrique Cardoso, 34th President of Brazil (from 1995 to 2002); in Rio de Janeiro
- Died: Fanny Holland, 83, English singer and comic actress

== Friday, June 19, 1931 ==
- The first commercial photodetector and motor system, commonly called an "electric eye", was installed by the General Electric company to operate the door between the kitchen and dining area of a restaurant in West Haven, Connecticut. GE marketed the system under the brand name "Magic Eye".

== Saturday, June 20, 1931 ==
- U.S. President Hoover announced his proposal, referred to in the press as the "Hoover Moratorium", to serve as a one-year suspension of the collection of war debts owed by the Allies of World War I to the United States, to apply to any nation that would grant Germany a similar moratorium on World War I reparations owed under the Treaty of Versailles.
- Karl Buresch became Chancellor of Austria.
- Born:
  - Olympia Dukakis, American stage and film actress, 1987 Academy Award winner; in Lowell, Massachusetts (d. 2021)
  - Arne Nordheim, Norwegian composer, in Larvik (d. 2010)

== Sunday, June 21, 1931 ==
- Film actress Evalyn Knapp was seriously injured in a fall from a cliff while hiking Hollywood Heights. Doctors feared she would be permanently paralyzed, but she recovered in a few months.
- Parliamentary elections were held in Bulgaria, with a victory for the four-party coalition known as the Popular Bloc.
- Born: Margaret Heckler, U.S. Representative for Massachusetts who later served as U.S. Secretary of Health and Human Services and later as U.S. Ambassador to Ireland; in Flushing, Queens, New York (d. 2018)
- Died: Lieutenant Hugh Chevis, 28, British Army officer, died of poisoning from strychnine that had been placed in his dinner the night before. The apparent homicide was never solved, despite several telegrams from a person identifying himself as "J. Hartigan" and suspicion of several persons, including Mrs. Chevis.

== Monday, June 22, 1931 ==
- A mass trial of the Sicilian Mafia ended in Italy after almost a year. 124 were given prison terms while 54 were freed.
- The Social Democratic Party of Germany's newspaper Munich reported on the rumored homosexuality of SA leader Ernst Röhm.
- Died: Armand Fallières, 89, President of France 1906–1913

== Tuesday, June 23, 1931 ==
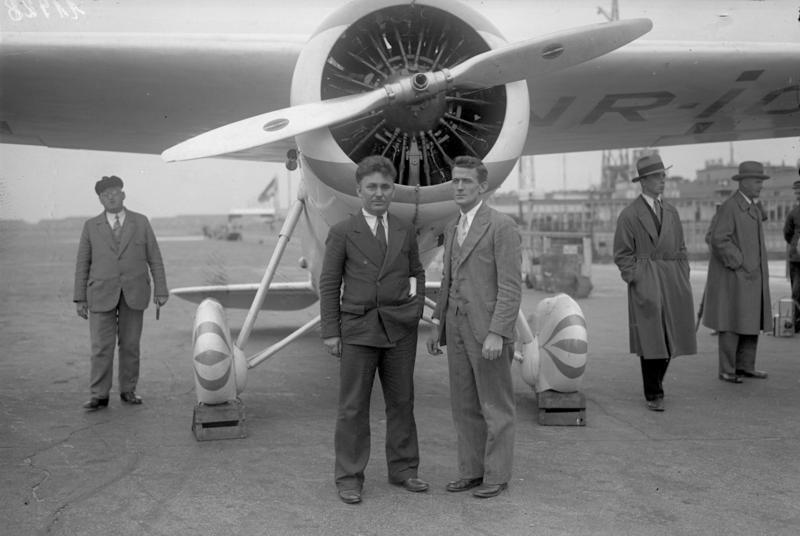
Wiley and Gatty in Berlin

- Wiley Post and Harold Gatty took off in the Lockheed Vega Winnie Mae from Roosevelt Field in an attempt to fly around the world in record time. Post and Gatty were successful in circumnavigating the world in 8 days, 15 hours and 15 minutes and returned to Long Island on July 1.
- The Arthur Honegger ballet Amphion was performed for the first time at the Paris Opera.
- Born: Ola Ullsten, Prime Minister of Sweden from 1978 to 1979, Foreign Minister 1978 to 1982; in Umeå (d. 2018)

== Wednesday, June 24, 1931 ==
- Germany and the Soviet Union extended the 1926 Treaty of Berlin.
- The Soviet Union signed a treaty of neutrality with Afghanistan.
- Italy announced that it would accept the Hoover Moratorium with no reservations, while France offered a counterproposal.
- Born: Billy Casper, golfer, in San Diego, California (d. 2015)

== Thursday, June 25, 1931 ==
- French, English and American banks agreed to give the Reichsbank a loan to tide it over until the end of the month.
- The Cuban government imposed censorship on four Havana papers for criticism of the Machado administration.
- Born:
  - V. P. Singh (Vishwanath Pratap Singh), Prime Minister of India from 1989 to 1990; in Daiya, Allahabad district, United Provinces, British India (d. 2008)
  - Jack Beal, American realist painter, in Richmond, Virginia (d. 2013);

== Friday, June 26, 1931 ==
- Spain fired Ramón Franco as chief of Aeronautics for alleged involvement in an anarchist plot to disrupt Sunday's elections. Due to fears of Franco's popularity, the decision was made not to imprison him.
- Bela Lugosi became a naturalized American citizen.
- Born: Colin Wilson, novelist and philosopher, in Leicester, England (d. 2013)

== Saturday, June 27, 1931 ==
- The Republic of Galicia was proclaimed in northwestern Spain by leftist Antón Alonso Ríos and Pedro Campos Couceiro, after the new Spanish Republic government temporarily halted construction of a railroad line intended to link the Galician city of Ourense to the larger city of Zamora. The government of Spain agreed to resume railway construction and the declaration of independence was rescinded after a few hours.
- The French Chamber of Deputies voted to accept the Hoover Moratorium with reservations.
- Born: Martinus J. G. Veltman, theoretical physicist and Nobel laureate, in Waalwijk, Netherlands (d. 2021)

== Sunday, June 28, 1931 ==
- General elections were held in Spain, with socialist parties winning the largest share of voting. Eight died in various outbreaks of violence around the country.
- Died: Henry Hobbs, 44, American football player and coach, died from heart disease

== Monday, June 29, 1931 ==
- Pope Pius XI published the encyclical Non abbiamo bisogno.
- Born: Brian Hutton, Baron Hutton, Lord Chief Justice of Northern Ireland and British Lord of Appeal in Ordinary, in Belfast (d. 2020)
- Died: Nérée Beauchemin, 81, French Canadian poet

== Tuesday, June 30, 1931 ==
- The film All Quiet on the Western Front, though banned in Germany, was allowed to be shown in a Berlin hall that had taken all precautions to avoid disturbances.
