= Green Bay News-Chronicle =

Daily newspaper in Green Bay, Wisconsin

- Type: Daily newspaper
- Format: Broadsheet (1972–1976); Tabloid (1976–2005)
- Owner(s): Metropolitan Newspaper Corp. (1972–1976); Brown County Publishing Co (1976–2004); Gannett (2004–2005)
- Publisher: Frank A. Wood (1976–2004) Ellen Leifeld (2004–2005)
- Editor: Tom Brooker (c. 2005)
- News editor: Ray Barrington (c. 2005)
- Founded: November 13, 1972
- Ceased publication: June 3, 2005
- Language: English
- Headquarters: Green Bay, WI
- Circulation: 5,000 (estimated during final year)
- Website: greenbaynewschron.com at the Wayback Machine (archive index)

The Green Bay News-Chronicle (originally known as the Green Bay Daily News) was a daily newspaper published in Green Bay, Wisconsin from 1972 to 2005. The paper was owned and operated by Denmark, Wisconsin-based Brown County Publishing Company during much of its existence, and competed with the larger and more established Green Bay Press-Gazette. The Gannett newspaper chain, the Press-Gazette's parent company, owned the News-Chronicle during its last year of existence.

== History ==
=== Early years ===
The News-Chronicle launched on November 13, 1972, as The Green Bay Daily News. The International Typographical Union had gone on strike against the Press-Gazette, unhappy with the hot-lead-to-computer typeset changeover and other new technologies that the Press-Gazette and other newspapers were acquiring at that time, which the union feared would cost its membership their jobs. The Daily News was formed to bring in money for the strikers and to support their cause.

From 1972 to 1976, the Daily News lost money in its head-to-head competition with the Press-Gazette. During the Daily News' first year, both newspapers were distributed in the afternoon. Shortly after beginning its second year of publication, the Daily News switched to a morning edition, allowing it to print the latest news and sports, including late games, several hours before the afternoon Press-Gazette. The smaller Daily News, with a circulation of roughly 12,000, competed against the larger Press-Gazette on several fronts, including breaking news on a John Doe investigation, breaking news on the National Football League Players Association strike against the NFL, and improved coverage of stock car racing, high school and college sports, and the Green Bay Bobcats hockey team. Wealthy local businessman Victor McCormick, who had a personal dislike for the Press-Gazette, became a major investor in the Daily News and remained an active voice in its operations until a 1976 heart attack forced him to end his financial support.

=== Frank Wood Takes Over ===
With the Daily News on the verge of bankruptcy and owing one of their creditors enough money to have them pull the plug, that creditor—Brown County Publishing Co., publisher of several weekly publications in Northeast Wisconsin and the Daily News' printer—agreed to buy the Daily News. The company's owner, Frank A. Wood, made the purchase believing that the Green Bay community could benefit from two daily newspapers.

Wood's first major change to the paper had already taken place three years earlier, when the Daily News moved from afternoon to morning publication. After the purchase, the paper was rechristened the Green Bay News-Chronicle (the hyphenated name referring to Wood's weekly paper, the Brown County Chronicle). Wood also revamped the paper from broadsheet to a tabloid format, which made it easier to read at the breakfast table. After purchasing the paper, he also started to grow a beard and vowed not to shave until the paper had a break-even month. It took 21 months and a 13-inch beard before the News-Chronicle turned a $125.81 profit in November 1977.

Wood brought editorial cartoonist Lyle Lahey over from the weekly Chronicle to the daily News-Chronicle. Lahey and his cartoons were a prominent feature of the News-Chronicle's Opinion section until the paper's closing. The Opinion section also featured a lively array of local columnists with varying viewpoints: Curt Andersen, Ray Barrington, Warren Bluhm, Michelle Kennedy, Bill LuMaye, Yvonne Metivier and Sid Vineburg.

The News-Chronicle gained a niche audience with its local sports coverage, including reporting on the sport of bowling. Wood decided to market subscriptions to the local bowling community, promising that their sport would receive better and more prominent coverage in the News-Chronicle. The move paid off with a substantial increase in subscriptions from area bowlers, as well as the paper earning several awards from bowling organizations for its in-depth coverage of the sport.

=== The battle with Gannett ===
By the mid-1980s, the paper had just started to make an occasional profit when Gannett, which had bought the Press-Gazette in 1980, started to make life difficult for the News-Chronicle, which at the time had a circulation of 15,000 compared to the Press-Gazette's 100,000. By virtue of its worldwide presence, Gannett could afford to sell its advertising at a much lower price, thus to stifling or killing competing papers such as the News-Chronicle.

Wood had long disdained Gannett and its operation of the Press-Gazette, but felt that the conglomerate's tactics went too far. He responded by calling on long-time friend and Santa Fe Reporter editor/publisher Richard McCord to document for the News-Chronicle the tactics Gannett used to rid its competition in other two-newspaper towns. In November and December 1989, those findings were printed in an award-winning two-week series, "It's Now Or Never", which chronicled the alleged abuses by Gannett and moves that the News-Chronicle had made to counter the Press-Gazette's tactics. McCord later wrote a book about Gannett's abuses and the News-Chronicle series, entitled The Chain Gang: One Newspaper Versus the Gannett Empire.

"It's Now Or Never" served as a battle cry for the News-Chronicle in its efforts to survive and remain a second voice in the Green Bay newspaper market. As a "call to arms" to local readers, however, the series proved to be too successful. The increased attention the series provided, along with subscription incentives, resulted in a deluge of subscription orders. The increase overwhelmed the paper's circulation staff, and as a result many subscribers became unhappy with the poor customer service, and dropped their subscriptions.

=== Advancements in the 1990s ===
Following an upgrade at the paper's Denmark printing facilities in the mid-1990s, the News-Chronicle added full-color photography and graphics to the paper. A major redesign in 1997 gave the paper a full-color front and back page. The paper's sections also underwent redesign, including the Friday entertainment section, "Rave!"

The News-Chronicle launched a Web site in September 1996, greenbaynewschron.com, getting on the Internet ahead of its competition. The entry was timely, as the Green Bay Packers' run to Super Bowls XXXI and XXXII gave the paper and its sports coverage worldwide attention.

By 1998, the Press-Gazette changed from an afternoon to a morning newspaper, first changing subscriptions in outlying rural areas to morning distribution and then gradually doing the same for Green Bay metropolitan area subscribers. This caused both newspapers to once again go head-to-head for subscribers and readership.

In 1999, the News-Chronicle began a Sunday edition which was distributed as part of the Milwaukee Journal Sentinel, requiring subscribers to take the Milwaukee paper if they wanted the News-Chronicle's Sunday edition. The move was seen as increasing the visibility of the Green Bay paper. After a few months, the News-Chronicle also sold its Sunday edition separately, and the joint venture started to dissolve when the Journal Sentinel changed distribution in the Green Bay area from its regular Sunday edition to an "early bird" version focused on early coupon and circular access without current news or sports coverage.

At the same time, the News-Chronicle also added a Sunday supplement, This Week, with writing from other newspapers owned by Brown County Publishing.

=== The end of the line ===
Wood's printing operation and other successful weeklies provided the profits to cover the News-Chronicle's losses. But by 2004, the then 76-year-old Wood finally ran out of steam. A downturn in the commercial printing market, as well as no set plans for succession within the company, forced Wood to sell his operations—and to the most unlikely of buyers. On July 23, 2004, Wood announced he would sell the News-Chronicle and his other weeklies to Gannett for an undisclosed price. Wood kept ownership of his printing business, as well as an automobile sales publication.

Many of the News-Chronicle's employees and readers were stunned at the announcement, but Gannett had said they would maintain the status quo for the short term. Although the News-Chronicle continued to publish as a separate paper, and received printing and technological upgrades as it was switched to Gannett facilities and presses, its circulation and advertising functions were gradually merged with that of the Press-Gazette.

The News-Chronicle's ownership by Gannett could not reverse the paper's failing health, as advertisers spent their advertising money with the larger Gannett newspaper, along with Gannett's acquisition of other publications down the lakeshore and around the Fox River Valley and Lake Winnebago, effectively consolidating a wide-ranging market with seven publications into one monopoly of those seven newspapers controlled by Gannett. On May 26, 2005, Gannett announced that the paper would cease operations with the June 3, 2005 edition. The News-Chronicle had been the longest-running "strike paper" in newspaper publishing history. Most of its remaining employees were offered jobs at other Gannett publications in the area.
