= Abrams, Wisconsin =

- Town
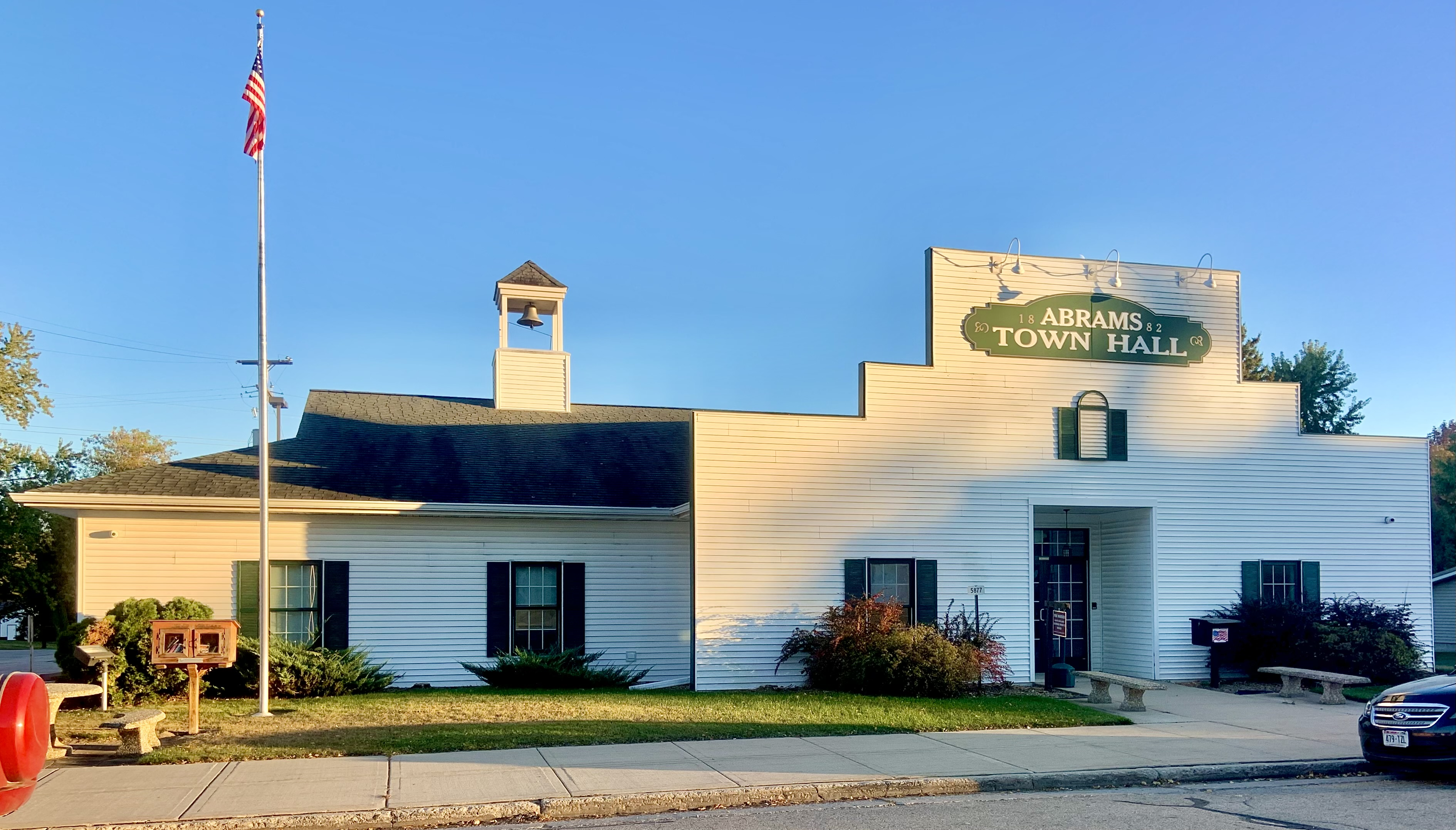
- Town Hall

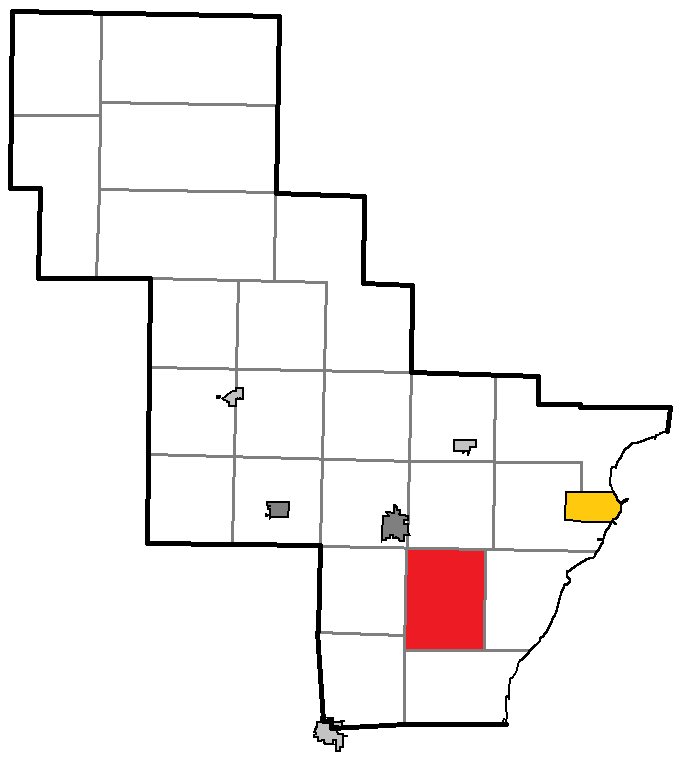
- Location of Abrams, within Oconto County
- Coordinates: 44°48′27″N 88°4′20″W
- Country: United States
- State: Wisconsin
- County: Oconto

Area
  - Total: 37.6 sq mi (97.3 km^{2})
  - Land: 37.5 sq mi (97.0 km^{2})
  - Water: 0.12 sq mi (0.3 km^{2})
- Elevation: 696 ft (212 m)

Population (2020)
  - Total: 1,960
  - Density: 52.3/sq mi (20.2/km^{2})
- Time zone: UTC-6 (Central (CST))
  - Summer (DST): UTC-5 (CDT)
- Area code: 920
- FIPS code: 55-00175
- GNIS feature ID: 1582651
- Website: www.townofabrams.com

Abrams is a town in Oconto County, Wisconsin, United States. The population was 1,960 at the 2020 Census. The census-designated place of Abrams is located in the town. It is located near U.S. Route 41 and U.S. Route 141, 8 miles (13 km) south-southeast of Oconto Falls. Abrams has a post office that has been operating since 1882 with ZIP code 54101. As of the 2020 census, the census-designated place had a population of 358.

== History ==
Abrams was first settled in 1854 when Richard B. Yeaton built a sawmill on the Pensaukee River. A community formed and he called the place West Pensaukee. The town was planned to be named Pumpkin Pine. It was renamed Abrams in the 1880s after W. J. Abrams, a former state representative and former mayor of Green Bay. Abrams owned land where a railroad depot was built. The town of Abrams was platted and established in 1917. By the 1890s, there were nearly 30 homes, multiple hotels, 3 general stores, a train depot, and multiple sawmills. Most of the earliest white settlers were from New England. By 1910, a bank and telephone service was added to the town. Fires nearly destroyed the town twice, one being the Peshtigo Fire and the other being a fire in 1923. The mystery of a murder of a local tavern keeper still haunts the town as it has never been solved.

== Geography ==
According to the United States Census Bureau, the town has a total area of 37.6 square miles (97 km^{2}), 37.5 square miles (97 km^{2}) of which (99.71%) is land, and 0.1 square miles (0.26 km^{2}) of which (0.29%) is water.

== Demographics ==
Historical population
| Census | Pop. | Note | %± |
|---|---|---|---|
| 2010 | 340 | | — |
| 2020 | 358 | | 5.3% |
U.S. Census

As of the census of 2020, there were 1,960 people. The racial makeup of the town was 95.8% White, 0.2% Black or African American, 0.80% Native American, 0.3% Asian, 0.1% Native Hawaiian or Pacific Islander, 0.3% other race, and 2.6% from two or more races. Hispanic or Latino of any race were 0.9% of the population.

== Notable people ==
- C. J. Greaves, professional American off-road racing driver, was born in the town
- Johnny Greaves, professional American off-road racing driver, was born in the town
- Pee Wee King, pioneer in the country and western music industry; wrote "Tennessee Waltz" and was inducted into the Country Music Hall of Fame in 1974
- Lyle Lahey, cartoonist
- Arthur J. Whitcomb, Wisconsin State Representative and lawyer, was born in the town
- Bob Wickman, Major League Baseball player, relief pitcher
