= Lyle Lahey =

American cartoonist (1931–2013)

- Born: August 23, 1931; Abrams, Wisconsin, U.S.
- Died: February 8, 2013 (aged 81)
- Education: University of Wisconsin–Madison
- Occupations: Political cartoonist, journalist, author
- Website: www.weimar.ws/lahey/index.html

Lyle Lahey (August 23, 1931 – February 8, 2013) was an American political cartoonist, journalist and the author of the book The Packer Chronicles (News-Chronicle, 1997)

Lahey was born in Abrams, Wisconsin. After a tour of duty with the U.S. Army in Korea, he completed a degree in journalism at the University of Wisconsin–Madison, where he also worked for the student newspaper The Daily Cardinal.

He served 13 years as a promotion manager at WBAY-TV in Green Bay, Wisconsin. In 1968, he began contributing editorial cartoons to the Brown County Chronicle, a weekly newspaper. His editorial cartoons on local, regional and national politics, the Green Bay Packers, world events, and much more appeared in the Brown County Chronicle and after 1976, its daily successor, The Green Bay News-Chronicle, from 1968 through 2005.

He was the editor of The News-Chronicle's commentary pages until 1996. A major topic of interest for him has always been environmental issues, for which he has won awards. In 1997, The News-Chronicle published The Packer Chronicles, a collection of Lahey's cartoons about Green Bay's hometown football team (the players, the coaches, and the fans). In 2005, The News-Chronicle was closed by its new owner, Gannett, which bought the paper 11 months earlier. In early 2006, Lahey started creating new political cartoons on his web site. He did three new cartoons a week. His last cartoon was dated February 3, 2013, five days before his death.
