= List of Stadium Super Trucks drivers =

The following is a list of drivers who have competed in the Stadium Super Trucks. Since the inaugural season in 2013, 133 different drivers have run at least one race in the series. The Boost Mobile Super Trucks, SST's Australian championship, saw 14 drivers between their first year in 2020 and last in 2021; both series combine their statistics.

Founder Robby Gordon, Sheldon Creed, Paul Morris, Matthew Brabham, and Gavin Harlien have won championships. Brabham has three, Gordon and Creed have two each, one of Morris' titles came in SST while the other was in the Boost Mobile Super Trucks, Harlien won in 2022, and most recently Max Gordon in 2025. Creed also holds the most race wins in SST history with 39.

Sara Price and Zoey Edenholm are the only female drivers to compete in SST.

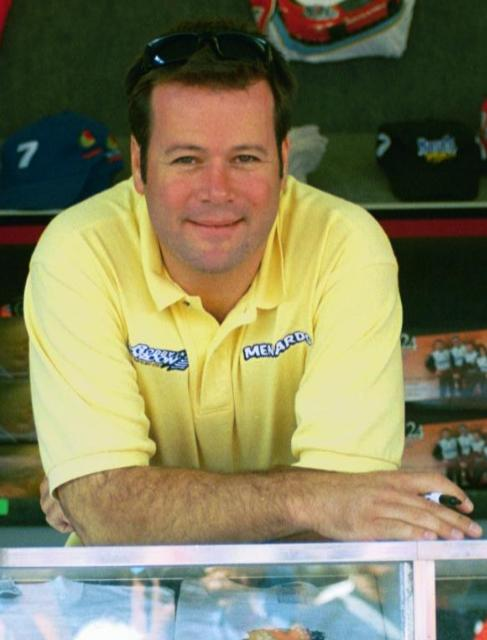
Robby Gordon, 2013 and 2014 champion

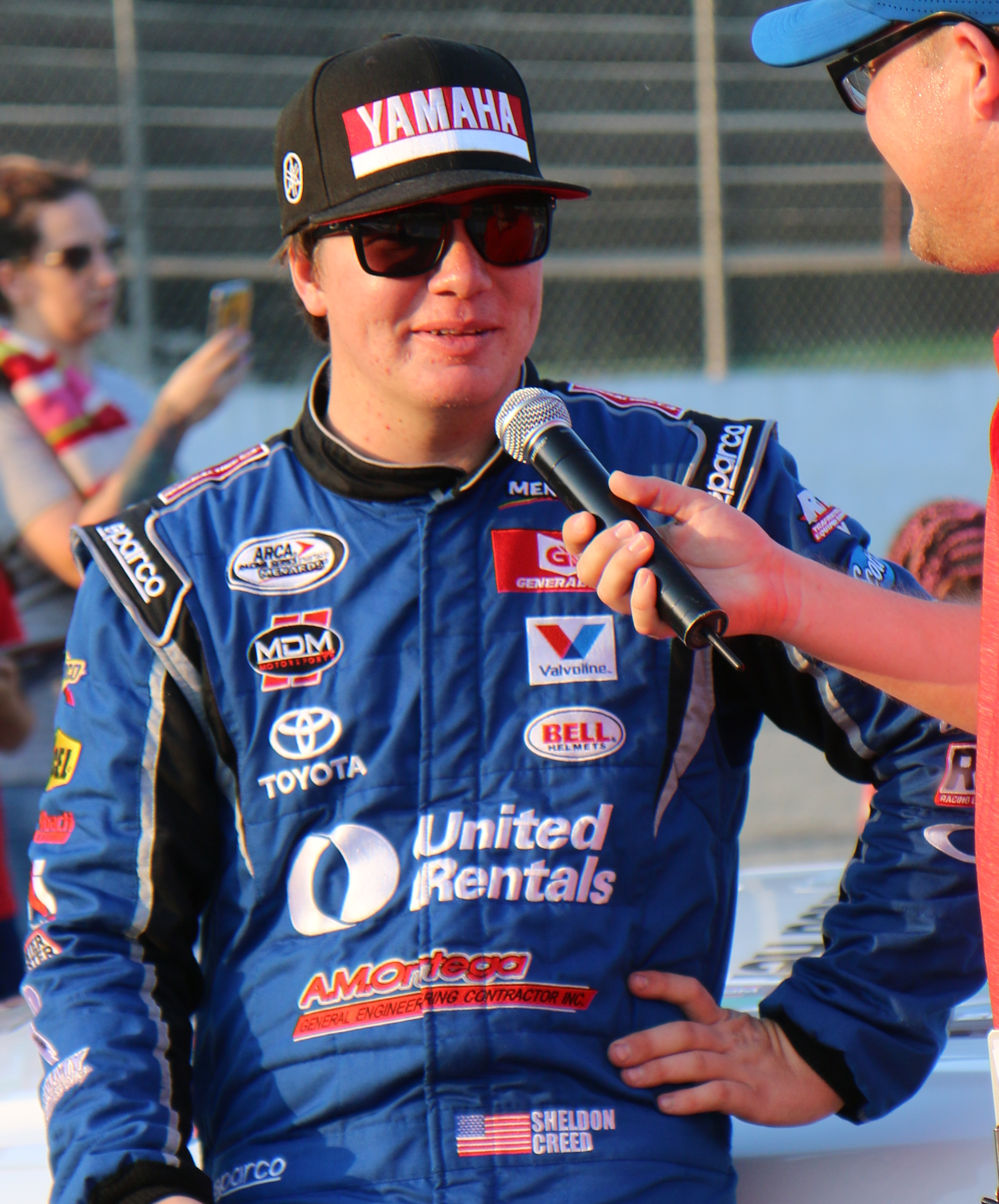
Sheldon Creed, 2015 and 2016 champion

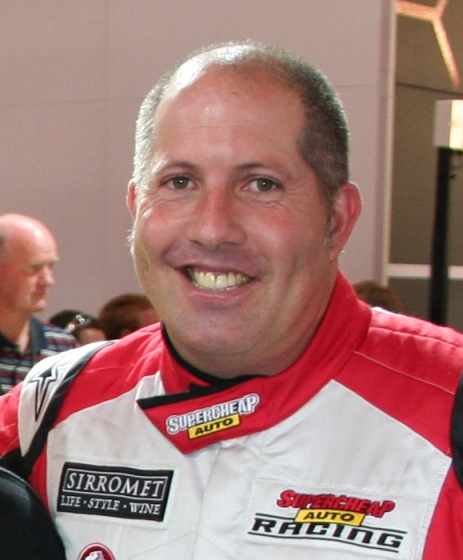
Paul Morris, 2017 champion and 2021 Boost Mobile Super Trucks champion

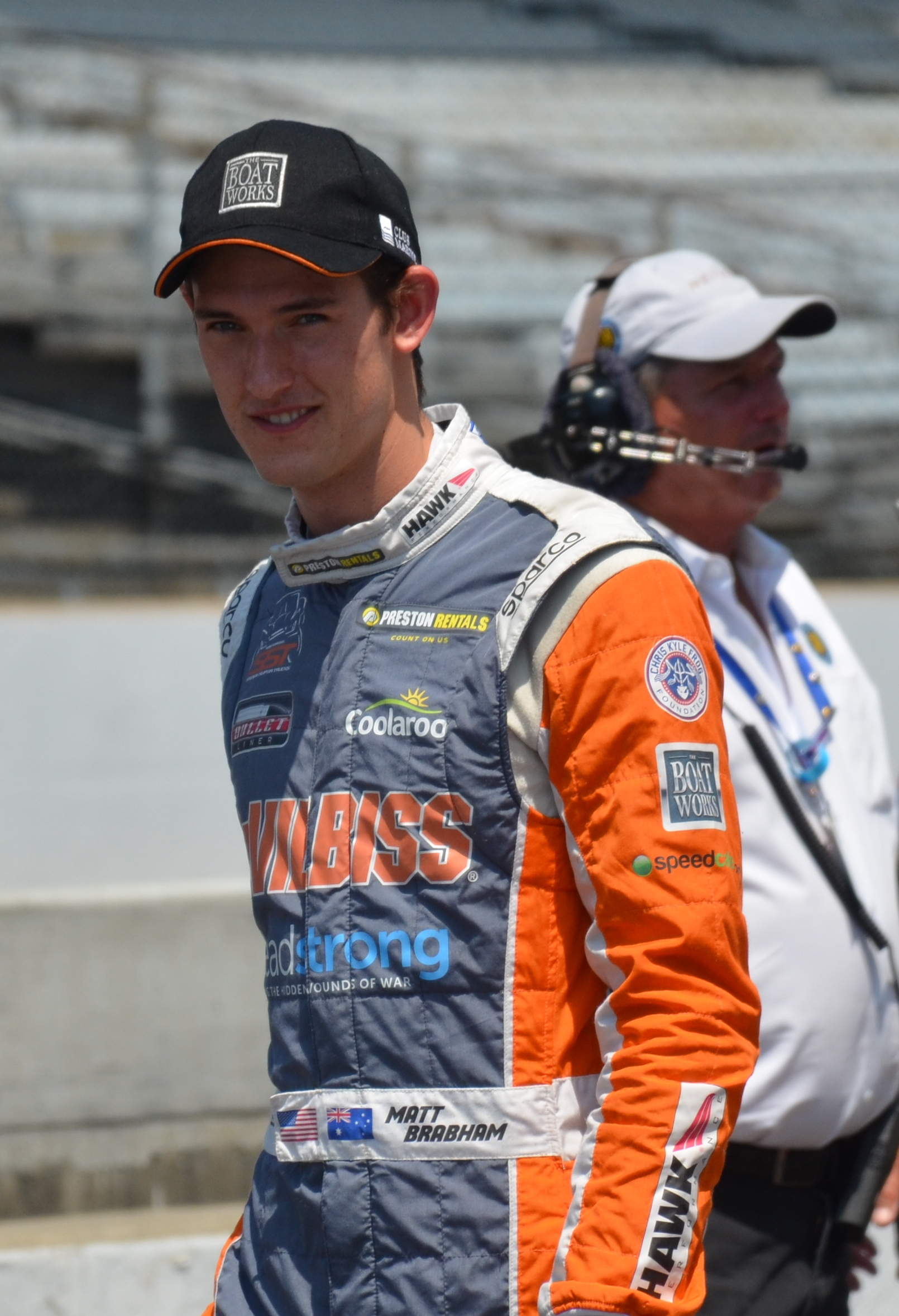
Matthew Brabham, 2018, 2019, and 2021 champion

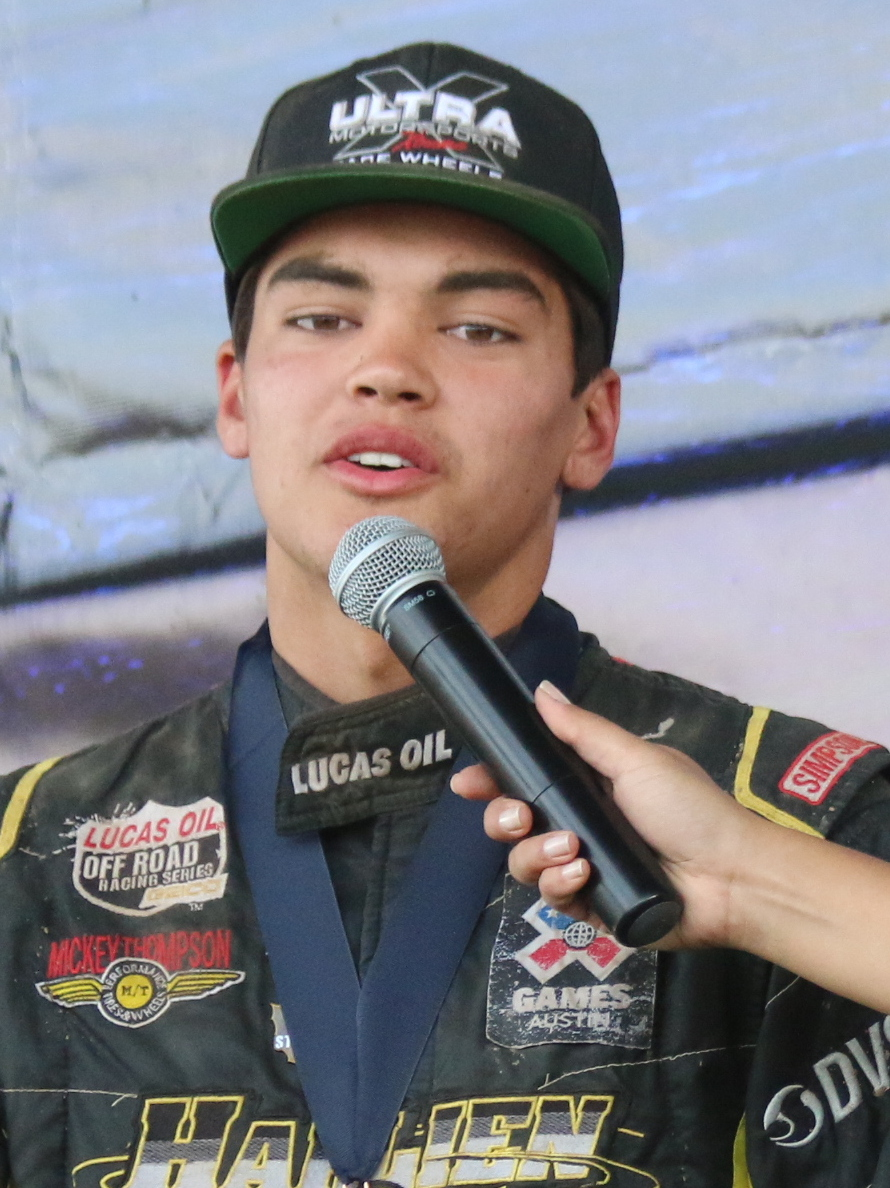
Gavin Harlien, 2022 and 2023 champion

== Key ==
†	Series champion
	Competing in the 2026 Stadium Super Trucks
	Raced in the Boost Mobile Super Trucks
*	Never ran a feature race after failing to qualify

Figures listed below are correct as of the most recent Stadium Super Trucks race weekend at the Grand Prix of Long Beach (April 19, 2026).

Heat race results such as wins are not included in the career total. Although some drivers failed to qualify for the feature race due to poor finishes in their heats, they receive points in the standings and are credited with starts by the series. Starts are not counted for races that a driver failed to start (classified as a "DNS").

== All-time drivers ==
Driver		Seasons Competed	First Race	Last Race	Starts	Wins	Podiums	Fastest Qualifiers	Championships
Jacob Abel	(United States)	2021	2021 Nashville	2021 Long Beach	3	0	1	0	0
Átila Abreu	(Brazil)	2017	2017 Detroit	2017 Detroit	2	0	0	0	0
Greg Adler	(United States)	2013–2015, 2017	2013 Phoenix	2017 Lake Elsinore	9	0	0	0	0
Khaled Al Mudhaf	(Kuwait)	2016	2016 Long Beach	2016 Long Beach	2	0	0	0	0
Adam Andretti	(United States)	2017–2018	2017 Lake Elsinore	2018 Road America	4	0	0	0	0
Ryan Arciero	(United States)	2022	2022 Long Beach	2022 Long Beach	2	0	0	0	0
BJ Baldwin	(United States)	2013–2014	2013 Costa Mesa	2014 Costa Mesa	4	0	0	0	0
Aaron Bambach	(United States)	2014–2014, 2021	2014 Toronto	2021 Mid-Ohio (IndyCar)	29	0	5	0	0
Stanton Barrett	(United States)	2021–2022	2021 Nashville	2022 Nashville	4	0	0	0	0
Nick Baumgartner	(United States)	2013–2014	2013 Phoenix	2014 X Games	7	0	1	0	0
Ryan Beat	(United States)	2019, 2022–2023	2019 Austin	2023 Nashville	8	0	1	0	0
Townsend Bell	(United States)	2013	2013 Toronto	2013 Toronto	1	0	0	0	0
David Bernstein	(United States)	2023–2025	2023 Long Beach	2025 Long Beach	8	0	0	0	0
Derek Bieri	(United States)	2022	2022 Bristol	2022 Bristol	2	0	0	0	0
Greg Biffle	(United States)	2018–2019, 2021	2018 Road America	2021 Mid-Ohio (IndyCar)	10	0	4	0	0
Bruce Binnquist	(United States)	2023	2023 Long Beach	2023 Long Beach	2	0	0	0	0
Barry Boes	(United States)	2020	2020 Road America	2020 Road America	2	0	0	0	0
Russell Boyle	(Canada)	2015–2016, 2018–2019	2015 Toronto	2019 Toronto	8	0	0	0	0
Matthew Brabham †	(Australia)	2015–2026	2015 Toronto	2026 Long Beach	121	27	85	23	3
Jerett Brooks	(United States)	2013–2015, 2017–2018, 2022	2013 San Diego	2022 Long Beach	25	2	8	1	0
Bruce Canepa	(United States)	2014	2014 Coronado	2014 Coronado	1	0	0	0	0
Matt Carriker	(United States)	2022	2022 Bristol	2022 Bristol	2	0	0	0	0
Dave Casey	(Australia)	2021	2021 Tasmania	2021 Townsville	9	0	0	0	0
Adrian Cenni	(United States)	2013	2013 Los Angeles	2013 San Diego	2	0	0	0	0
Myles Cheek	(United States)	2017, 2023–2026	2017 Long Beach	2026 Long Beach	12	2	5	1	0
E. J. Chiba	(Japan)	2018–2019	2018 Texas	2019 Long Beach	4	0	0	0	0
Henrique Cisneros	(United States)	2014	2014 Detroit	2014 X Games	2	0	0	0	0
Rob Cowie	(Australia)	2016, 2024	2016 Adelaide	2024 Adelaide	3	0	0	0	0
Sheldon Creed †	(United States)	2013–2021	2013 San Diego	2021 Mid-Ohio (NASCAR)	91	39	59	26	2
Shae Davies	(Australia)	2020–2021	2020 Adelaide	2024 Adelaide	14	3	9	2	0
Erik Davis	(United States)	2015–2018	2015 St. Petersburg	2018 Glen Helen	23	0	0	0	0
Tommy Dawson	(Australia)	2018	2018 Road America	2018 Road America	2	0	0	0	0
Troy Diede	(United States)	2016–2018	2016 Costa Mesa	2018 Long Beach	6	0	0	0	0
Dale Dondel	(United States)	2015	2015 Long Beach	2015 Long Beach	1	0	0	0	0
Craig Dontas	(Australia)	2016–2017	2016 Surfers Paradise	2017 Darwin	12	1	1	0	0
Charles Dorrance	(United States)	2014–2015	2014 Indianapolis	2015 Las Vegas Village	22	0	0	0	0
Zoey Edenholm	(United States)	2020–2026	2020 Road America	2026 Long Beach	20	0	0	0	0
Ryan Eversley	(United States)	2019	2019 Toronto	2019 Mid-Ohio (NASCAR)	4	0	1	0	0
Greg Foster	(United States)	2013	2013 Costa Mesa	2013 Costa Mesa	3	0	0	0	0
Phillip Foster	(Australia)	2021	2021 Townsville	2021 Townsville	3	0	0	0	0
Brad Gallard	(Australia)	2015	2015 Adelaide	2015 Adelaide	3	0	0	0	0
Anthony Gandon	(France)	2015	2015 Las Vegas Village	2015 Las Vegas Village	2	0	0	0	0
Greg Gartner	(Australia)	2015–2018, 2020–2021	2015 Surfers Paradise	2021 Darwin	28	0	1	0	0
Billy Geddes	(Australia)	2015	2015 Adelaide	2015 Adelaide	1	0	0	0	0
Max Gordon	(United States)	2020–2026	2020 Road America	2026 Long Beach	32	5	12	1	1
Robby Gordon †	(United States)	2013–2026	2013 Phoenix	2026 Long Beach	160	32	101	21	3
C. J. Greaves	(United States)	2015	2015 X Games	2015 X Games	1	0	0	0	0
Davey Hamilton	(United States)	2013–2014, 2016	2013 Toronto	2016 Long Beach	6	0	1	0	0
Davey Hamilton Jr.	(United States)	2017–2018, 2022	2017 St. Petersburg	2022 Long Beach	12	0	0	0	0
Gavin Harlien †	(United States)	2014–2015, 2017–2019, 2023	2014 St. Petersburg	2023 Nashville	80	12	39	2	1
Brock Heger	(United States)	2013	2013 Crandon	2013 Costa Mesa	3	0	0	0	0
Trey Hernquist	(United States)	2023–2026	2023 Long Beach	2026 Long Beach	10	0	1	0	0
Luke van Herwaarde	(Australia)	2020	2020 Adelaide	2020 Adelaide	3	0	0	0	0
Blade Hildebrand	(United States)	2018–2019, 2023	2018 Lake Elsinore	2023 Nashville	28	1	4	1	0
Jeff Hoffman	(United States)	2017–2019	2017 Adelaide	2019 Portland	56	2	14	2	0
John Holtger	(United States)	2019–2020	2019 Road America	2020 Road America	5	0	0	0	0
Bill Hynes	(United States)	2014–2026	2014 Toronto	2026 Long Beach	130	1	6	0	0
Brian Ickler	(United States)	2016	2016 Charlotte	2016 Charlotte	2	0	0	0	0
Russell Ingall	(Australia)	2018–2019, 2021	2018 Sydney (Eastern Creek)	2021 Darwin	9	0	0	0	0
Mike Jenkins	(United States)	2013	2013 Phoenix	2013 Costa Mesa	10	0	0	0	0
Burt Jenner	(United States)	2014–2017	2014 Indianapolis	2017 Lake Elsinore	33	4	10	0	0
Larry Job	(United States)	2015	2015 Detroit	2015 Detroit	1	0	0	0	0
Jessie Johnson	(United States)	2013, 2016	2013 San Diego	2016 Charlotte	2	0	1	0	0
Ricky Johnson	(United States)	2013, 2021	2013 Long Beach	2021 Nashville	6	0	0	0	0
P. J. Jones	(United States)	2013–2017	2013 Phoenix	2017 Texas	37	4	8	1	0
Aaron Kaufman	(United States)	2015	2015 Costa Mesa	2015 Costa Mesa	2	0	0	0	0
Steve Kendall	(United States)	2017	2017 Watkins Glen	2017 Watkins Glen	2	0	0	0	0
Dave Kiley	(United States)	2022	2022 Bristol	2022 Bristol	2	0	0	0	0
Austin Kimbrell	(United States)	2013	2013 Phoenix	2013 Long Beach	2	0	0	0	0
Keegan Kincaid	(United States)	2013–2016	2013 St. Louis	2016 Detroit	44	4	14	1	0
Jake Kostecki	(Australia)	2017	2017 Perth	2017 Perth	1	0	0	0	0
Lalo Laguna	(Mexico)	2013, 2015, 2018	2013 Phoenix	2018 Lake Elsinore	9	0	0	0	0
Kyle LeDuc	(United States)	2013, 2015–2016	2013 Las Vegas (Caesars Palace)	2016 Costa Mesa	5	0	1	0	0
Bo LeMastus	(United States)	2021	2021 St. Petersburg	2021 Long Beach	8	0	0	0	0
Augie Lerch	(United States)	2015–2016	2015 Costa Mesa	2016 St. Petersburg	5	0	1	0	0
Justin Lofton	(United States)	2013	2013 Phoenix	2013 Las Vegas Village	17	3	5	4	0
Apdaly Lopez	(Mexico)	2013–2015, 2017–2018	2013 St. Louis	2018 Race of Champions	28	4	7	0	0
Arie Luyendyk Jr.	(United States)	2013–2021, 2025	2013 Phoenix	2025 Long Beach	61	3	14	0	0
Rob MacCachren	(United States)	2013	2013 Phoenix	2013 Las Vegas (Caesars Palace)	11	4	8	1	0
Ben Maier	(United States)	2022–2024	2022 Mid-Ohio	2024 Long Beach	10	0	1	0	0
Justin Matney	(United States)	2013–2014	2013 Phoenix	2014 X Games	6	0	1	0	0
Cleetus McFarland	(United States)	2022	2022 Long Beach	2022 Bristol	6	0	1	0	0
Tyler McQuarrie	(United States)	2016	2016 St. Petersburg	2016 Costa Mesa	7	0	3	0	0
Casey Mears	(United States)	2017–2019	2017 Lake Elsinore	2019 Portland	14	0	1	0	0
J. C. Meynet	(United States)	2026	2026 Long Beach	2026 Long Beach	2	0	0	0	0
Travis Milburn	(Australia)	2017–2018, 2021	2017 Adelaide	2024 Adelaide	8	0	2	0	0
Matt Mingay	(Australia)	2015–2016, 2020	2015 Adelaide	2020 Adelaide	18	1	3	0	0
Bradley Morris	(United States)	2014	2014 Long Beach	2014 Long Beach	1	0	0	0	0
Nash Morris	(Australia)	2021	2021 Darwin	2021 Darwin	3	0	1	0	0
Paul Morris †	(Australia)	2015–2021	2015 Surfers Paradise	2021 Townsville	76	7	28	5	2
Rino Navera	(United States)	2013	2013 Costa Mesa	2013 Costa Mesa	2	0	0	0	0
Matt Nolan	(Australia)	2016, 2018–2019	2016 Surfers Paradise	2019 Surfers Paradise	10	0	0	0	0
Jett Noland	(United States)	2020–2021	2020 Road America	2021 Nashville	8	0	0	0	0
Pat O'Keefe	(United States)	2016	2016 St. Petersburg	2016 Long Beach	4	0	0	0	0
Max Papis	(Italy)	2016	2016 Toronto	2016 Toronto	2	0	0	0	0
Travis Pastrana	(United States)	2015	2015 X Games	2015 X Games	1	0	0	0	0
Travis PeCoy	(United States)	2014, 2019	2014 Las Vegas Village	2019 Austin	3	0	0	0	0
Robbie Pierce	(United States)	2014, 2016	2014 Indianapolis	2016 Adelaide	5	0	0	0	0
Christopher Polvoorde	(United States)	2019	2019 Road America	2019 Road America	3	0	1	0	0
Cole Potts	(United States)	2018–2019, 2025	2018 Lake Elsinore	2025 Long Beach	37	4	15	0	0
Craig Potts	(United States)	2013	2013 Crandon	2013 Las Vegas (Caesars Palace)	7	0	0	0	0
Nathan Pretty	(Australia)	2015	2015 Adelaide	2015 Adelaide	3	0	0	0	0
Brandon Parrish	(United States)	2021	2021 Long Beach	2021 Long Beach	2	0	0	0	0
Sara Price	(United States)	2016–2017, 2020	2016 Toronto	2020 Adelaide	14	0	0	0	0
Toby Price	(Australia)	2015–2021	2015 Adelaide	2021 Townsville	24	1	7	0	0
Rob Radmann	(United States)	2023	2023 Nashville	2023 Nashville	2	0	0	0	0
Jay Reichert*	(United States)	2014	2014 X Games	2014 X Games	1	0	0	0	0
Danny Reidy	(Australia)	2015	2015 Granville	2015 Granville	1	0	0	0	0
Shaun Richardson	(United Kingdom)	2016–2017, 2020–2022, 2024, 2026	2016 Townsville	2026 Long Beach	29	0	5	0	0
Beau Robinson	(Australia)	2017	2017 Perth	2017 Perth	3	0	0	0	0
Todd Romano	(United States)	2016–2017	2016 Townsville	2017 Beijing	4	0	0	0	0
Dave Royce	(United States)	2014	2014 Coronado	2014 Las Vegas Village	3	0	0	0	0
Bobby Runyan Jr.	(United States)	2014	2014 X Games	2014 X Games	1	0	0	0	0
Boris Said*	(United States)	2015	2015 X Games	2015 X Games	1	0	0	0	0
Dustin Scott	(United States)	2016	2016 St. Petersburg	2016 Toronto	8	0	0	0	0
Mads Siljehaug	(Norway)	2021	2021 Long Beach	2021 Long Beach	2	0	0	0	0
Fielding Shredder	(United States)	2022	2022 Bristol	2022 Bristol	2	0	0	0	0
Zane Smith	(United States)	2020	2020 Road America	2020 Road America	2	0	0	0	0
Christian Sourapas	(United States)	2021	2021 Long Beach	2021 Long Beach	2	0	0	0	0
Dave Sparks	(United States)	2022	2022 Bristol	2022 Bristol	2	0	0	0	0
Scotty Steele	(United States)	2013–2016	2013 Crandon	2016 Detroit	41	1	12	0	0
Jeremy Stenberg*	(United States)	2015	2015 X Games	2015 X Games	1	0	0	0	0
RJ Stidham	(United States)	2024	2024 Long Beach	2024 Long Beach	2	0	0	0	0
Robert Stout	(United States)	2021–2023	2021 St. Petersburg	2023 Nashville	22	3	8	1	0
Li Ya Tao	(China)	2017	2017 Beijing	2017 Beijing	1	0	0	0	0
Brett Thomas	(Australia)	2015	2015 Surfers Paradise	2015 Surfers Paradise	4	0	0	0	0
Joshua Thomas	(Australia)	2023	2023 Long Beach	2023 Long Beach	2	0	0	0	0
Paul Tracy	(Canada)	2013–2014, 2016	2013 Toronto	2016 Toronto	5	0	0	0	0
Zach Van Matre	(United States)	2019, 2021	2019 Long Beach	2021 Nashville	4	0	0	0	0
Nick Vanis	(United States)	2014	2014 Long Beach	2014 Coronado	6	0	0	0	0
Ryan Villopoto	(United States)	2017	2017 Lake Elsinore	2017 Lake Elsinore	2	0	0	0	0
E. J. Viso	(Venezuela)	2014–2016	2014 Long Beach	2016 Townsville	27	7	11	5	0
Kenny Wallace	(United States)	2016	2016 Charlotte	2016 Charlotte	1	0	0	0	0
Rusty Wallace*	(United States)	2015	2015 X Games	2015 X Games	1	0	0	0	0
Jeff Ward	(United States)	2013, 2021	2013 Phoenix	2021 Long Beach	8	0	0	0	0
Paul Weel	(Australia)	2020–2021	2020 Adelaide	2021 Townsville	12	2	5	1	0
Mike Whiddett	(New Zealand)	2015	2015 Costa Mesa	2015 Costa Mesa	3	0	0	0	0
Rob Whyte	(Australia)	2016, 2021	2016 Townsville	2024 Adelaide	11	0	0	0	0
Blake Wilkey	(United States)	2026	2026 Long Beach	2026 Long Beach	2	0	0	0	0
Cory Winner	(United States)	2022	2022 Mid-Ohio	2022 Mid-Ohio	2	0	0	0	0

=== Boost Mobile Super Trucks ===
Driver		Seasons Competed	First Race	Last Race	Starts	Wins	Podiums	Fastest Qualifiers	Championships
Dave Casey	(Australia)	2021	2021 Tasmania	2021 Townsville	9	0	0	0	0
Rob Cowie	(Australia)	2021	2021 Adelaide	2021 Adelaide	2	0	0	0	0
Shae Davies	(Australia)	2020–2021	2020 Adelaide	2021 Adelaide	14	3	9	2	0
Phillip Foster	(Australia)	2021	2021 Townsville	2021 Townsville	3	0	0	0	0
Greg Gartner	(Australia)	2020–2021	2020 Adelaide	2021 Darwin	6	0	1	0	0
Luke van Herwaarde	(Australia)	2020	2020 Adelaide	2020 Adelaide	3	0	0	0	0
Russell Ingall	(Australia)	2021	2021 Tasmania	2021 Darwin	5	0	0	0	0
Travis Milburn	(Australia)	2021	2021 Darwin	2021 Adelaide	8	0	2	0	0
Matt Mingay	(Australia)	2020	2020 Adelaide	2020 Adelaide	3	0	0	0	0
Nash Morris	(Australia)	2021	2021 Darwin	2021 Darwin	3	0	1	0	0
Paul Morris †	(Australia)	2020–2021	2021 Adelaide	2021 Townsville	12	4	7	0	1
Toby Price	(Australia)	2020–2021	2021 Adelaide	2021 Townsville	6	1	3	0	0
Shaun Richardson	(United Kingdom)	2020–2021	2020 Adelaide	2021 Adelaide	14	0	4	0	0
Paul Weel	(Australia)	2020–2021	2020 Adelaide	2021 Townsville	12	2	5	1	0
Rob Whyte	(Australia)	2021	2021 Darwin	2021 Adelaide	11	0	0	0	0
