= List of Stadium Super Trucks tracks =

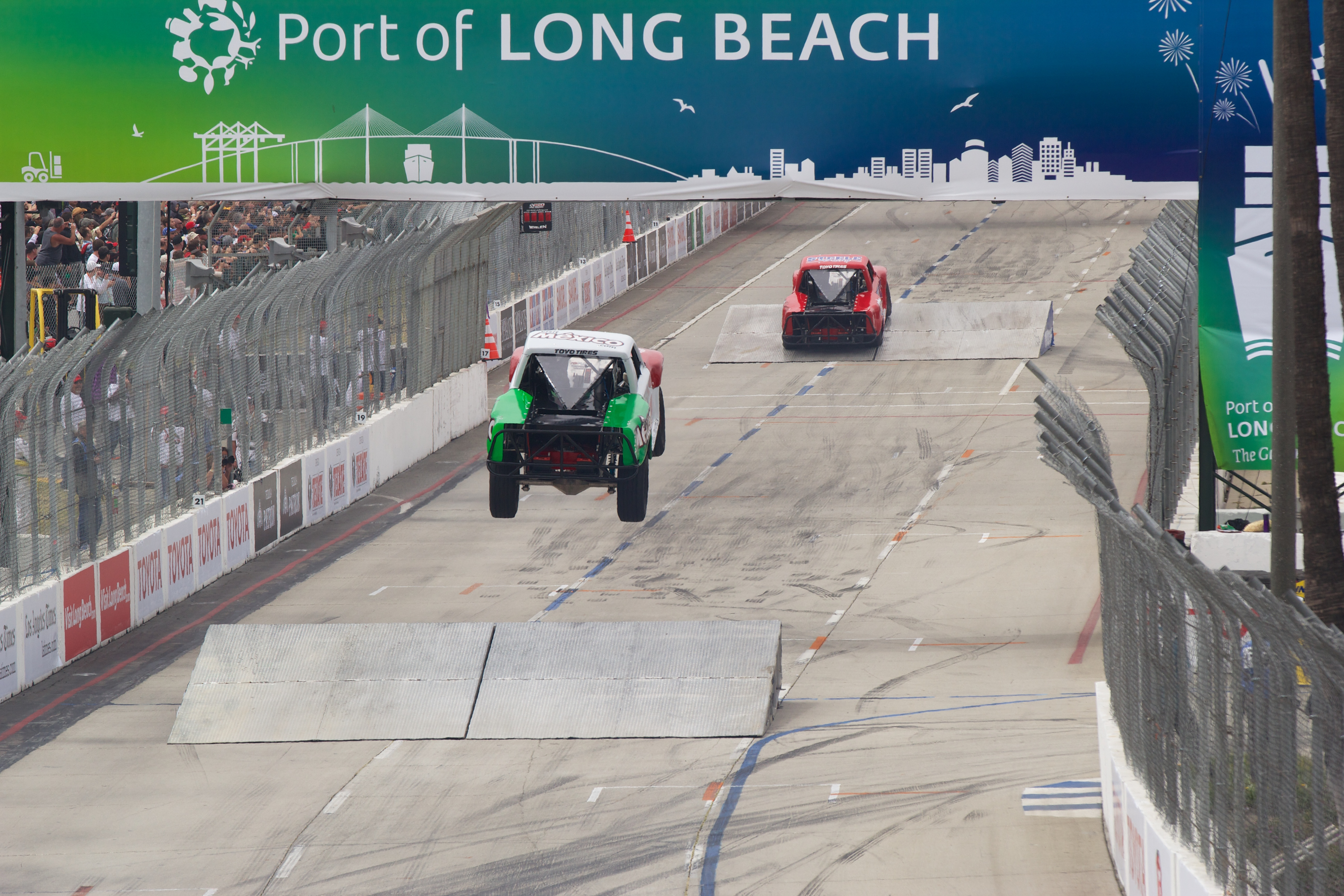
Stadium Super Trucks at the Grand Prix of Long Beach, which has hosted the series since the first season in 2013

The following is a list of tracks that have hosted a Stadium Super Trucks race weekend.

True to the series name, the trucks originally raced mainly in American football stadiums on special dirt courses in emulation of the Mickey Thompson Entertainment Group stadium truck championship; four of the ten tracks that hosted a race during the inaugural season in 2013 were National Football League venues. From 2014 onward, the series began to shift toward road courses and street circuits as a support class for the IndyCar Series, a decision that founder Robby Gordon explained in 2017 helped bring the off-road-centric discipline to a "completely different fan audience." The track layout for these support races follow the IndyCar configuration but add aluminum ramps that enable the trucks to go airborne. SST has also supported other championships and events such as NASCAR and the Race of Champions. The Boost Mobile Super Trucks, SST's standalone Australian series, supported the Supercars Championship. SST began racing in Oceania in 2015. Much of the trucks' Australian competition was under Motorsport Australia sanction, though the series has also supported the Australian Auto Sport Alliance and Ultimate Sprintcar Championship.

Despite shifting to being the undercard for major racing disciplines, the series has continued to host standalone events on occasion such as the Race & Rock World Championship at Lake Elsinore Diamond and the Robby Gordon Off-Road World Championships at Glen Helen Regional Park. Although SST has also participated at events such as the Goodwood Festival of Speed and Race of Champions in 2014 and conducted special races such as the 2016 Mike's Peak Hill Climb Challenge in Baja California, those host sites are not listed below as they are not considered official SST races.

== Key ==
Supporting the IndyCar Series
Supporting the Supercars Championship
Supporting NASCAR
Supporting IndyCar and NASCAR
Standalone; SST is either the main or only event of the weekend

Figures listed below are correct as of the most recent Stadium Super Trucks race weekend at the Grand Prix of Long Beach (April 18–19, 2026).

"Rounds Held" refers to the total number of race weekends hosted by a track, while "Races Held" means the amount of races held. A round can consist of multiple races. Heat races are not included.

== 2026 tracks ==
Track	Type	Location	Seasons	Rounds Held	Races Held	Supporting
Long Beach Street Circuit	Street circuit	Long Beach, California	2013–2019, 2021–2026	13	25	Grand Prix of Long Beach

== Former tracks ==
Track	Type	Location	Seasons	Rounds Held	Races Held	Supporting
Adelaide Street Circuit	Street circuit	Adelaide, South Australia	2015–2018, 2020, 2024	6	17	Adelaide 500
Beijing National Stadium	Stadium	Beijing, China	2017	1	1	Monster Jam
Belle Isle Street Circuit	Street circuit	Detroit, Michigan	2014–2018	5	12 (Note: Does not include 2016 Race 2, which was struck from records due to Matt Mingay's accident.)	Detroit Grand Prix
Bristol Motor Speedway	Oval road course	Bristol, Tennessee	2022	1	2	Bristol 1000
Caesars Palace	Street circuit	Paradise, Nevada	2013	1	1	Standalone
Charlotte Motor Speedway Dirt Track	Dirt track	Charlotte, North Carolina	2016	1	2	TORC: The Off-Road Championship
Circuit of the Americas	Mixed surface (X Games), road course (IndyCar)	Austin, Texas	2014–2015, 2019	3	4	X Games, IndyCar Classic
Coronado Naval Station	Street circuit	San Diego, California	2014	1	1	Coronado Speed Festival
Crandon International Off-Road Raceway	Off-road	Crandon, Wisconsin	2013	1	2	TORC: The Off-Road Championship
Edward Jones Dome (Note: Now called The Dome at America's Center.)	Stadium	St. Louis, Missouri	2013	1	1	Standalone
Exhibition Place	Street circuit	Toronto, Ontario	2013–2016, 2019	5	10	Grand Prix of Toronto
Foro Sol	Stadium	Mexico City, Mexico	2018	1	2	Race of Champions
Glen Helen Regional Park	Off-road	San Bernardino, California	2018	1	2	Robby Gordon Off-Road World Championships
Hidden Valley Raceway	Road course	Darwin, Northern Territory	2017, 2021	2	6	Darwin Triple Crown
Homebush Street Circuit	Street circuit	Sydney Olympic Park, New South Wales	2015	1 (Note: Exhibition round.)	3	Sydney 500
Indianapolis Motor Speedway	Road course	Speedway, Indiana	2014	1	2	Indianapolis 500
Lake Elsinore Diamond	Stadium	Lake Elsinore, California	2017–2018	2	3	Race & Rock SST World Championship (2017)
Las Vegas Village (Note: Previously called MGM Resorts Village.)	Street circuit	Paradise, Nevada	2014–2015	2	4	SEMA (2014)
Los Angeles Memorial Coliseum	Stadium	Los Angeles, California	2013	1	1	Standalone
Mid-Ohio Sports Car Course	Road course	Lexington, Ohio	2019, 2021–2022	5	10	Indy 200 at Mid-Ohio, B&L Transport 170
Nashville Street Circuit	Street circuit	Nashville, Tennessee	2021–2023	3	6	Music City Grand Prix
OC Fair & Event Center	Mixed surface	Costa Mesa, California	2013–2016	4	10	Sand Sports Super Show
Portland International Raceway	Road course	Portland, Oregon	2019	1	2	Grand Prix of Portland
Qualcomm Stadium (Note: Was called SDCCU Stadium prior to its demolition.)	Stadium	San Diego, California	2013	2	2	Standalone
Reid Park Street Circuit	Street circuit	Townsville, Queensland	2016, 2021	2	6	Townsville 500
Road America	Road course	Elkhart Lake, Wisconsin	2018–2020	3	7	Henry 180
St. Petersburg Street Circuit	Street circuit	St. Petersburg, Florida	2014–2017, 2021	5	10	Grand Prix of St. Petersburg
Surfers Paradise Street Circuit	Street circuit	Surfers Paradise, Queensland	2015–2016, 2019	3	9	Gold Coast 600
Sydney Motorsport Park	Road course	Eastern Creek, New South Wales	2018	1	2	Sydney SuperNight
Sydney Speedway (Note: Called Valvoline Raceway for naming rights reasons.)	Dirt track	Granville, New South Wales	2015	1	1	Ultimate Sprintcar Championship
Symmons Plains Raceway	Road course	Launceston, Tasmania	2021	1	3	Tasmania SuperSprint
Texas Motor Speedway	Mixed surface	Fort Worth, Texas	2017–2019	3	6	Rainguard Water Sealers 600, O'Reilly Auto Parts 500
University of Phoenix Stadium (Note: Now called State Farm Stadium.)	Stadium	Glendale, Arizona	2013	1	1	Standalone
Wanneroo Raceway	Road course	Neerabup, Western Australia	2017–2018	2	5	Perth SuperSprint
Watkins Glen International	Road course	Watkins Glen, New York	2017	1	2	Grand Prix at The Glen
