= 2020 Boost Mobile Super Trucks =

Australian off-road racing season

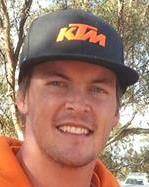
Although no standings were kept for the season, Toby Price would have recorded the most points under the series' points system

The 2020 Boost Mobile Super Trucks were the first season for the Boost Mobile Super Trucks, an Australian off-road racing series spawned as an offshoot of the American Stadium Super Trucks.

Due to the COVID-19 pandemic, much of the season's races were cancelled following the opening race at the Adelaide 500. Three of the eight rounds were to be combination races held alongside the Stadium Super Trucks. As a result, the series did not track standings for the season. Shae Davies was the lone Boost Mobile Super Truck driver to win a race.

== Drivers ==
No.	Driver	Races
2	(Australia) Matt Mingay	All
12	(United Kingdom) Shaun Richardson	All
50	(Australia) Paul Weel	All
38	(Australia) Luke van Herwaarde	All
67	(Australia) Paul Morris	All
87	(Australia) Toby Price	All
88	(Australia) Shae Davies	All
410	(Australia) Greg Gartner	All
Sources: (Note: Entry lists: Adelaide (Races 1–3))

== Schedule ==
During the 2019 Gold Coast 600 in October, the series' first race in Australia since Motorsport Australia lifted its year-long ban, the 2020 Australian schedule was announced under the Boost Mobile Super Trucks name. The full schedule was revealed on 21 November 2019, with the series being divided into the American Speed Energy Stadium Super Trucks and the Australian Boost Mobile Super Trucks; both championships intended to run three companion rounds.

Round	Track	Location	Date	Supporting
1	**Adelaide Street Circuit**	**Adelaide, South Australia**	21–23 February	Adelaide 500
Combination races with Boost Mobile Super Trucks listed in bold

=== Races cancelled due to the COVID-19 pandemic ===
Track	Location	Supporting
Symmons Plains Raceway	(Australia) Launceston, Tasmania	Tasmania Super400
Hampton Downs Motorsport Park	(New Zealand) Waikato, Auckland Region	Auckland Super400
**Wanneroo Raceway**	**Neerabup, Western Australia**	Perth SuperNight
Townsville Street Circuit	(Australia) Townsville, Queensland	Townsville 400
Hidden Valley Raceway	(Australia) Darwin, Northern Territory	Darwin Triple Crown
Sydney Motorsport Park	(Australia) Eastern Creek, New South Wales	Sydney SuperNight 300
**Surfers Paradise Street Circuit**	(Australia) **Surfers Paradise, Queensland**	Gold Coast 600

== Season summary ==
The Boost Mobile Super Trucks' inaugural race weekend came as an "Australia v USA Series" with the Speed Energy Stadium Super Trucks at the Adelaide Street Circuit. Excluding defending SST champion and Australian-American Matthew Brabham, eight drivers represented Australia at Adelaide. Among the Australian drivers were Supercars veteran Paul Weel in his return to racing for the first time since 2008, 2017 Stadium Super Trucks champion Paul Morris and his driving academy driver Luke van Herwaade under the Team Norwell banner, Super2 Series driver Shae Davies, Shaun Richardson in his first SST race since 2017, SST veterans Toby Price and Greg Gartner, and Matt Mingay racing for the first time since suffering serious injuries in a 2016 SST race. Robby Gordon won the season opener after holding off a last-lap charge by Price. The second race saw Mingay and Morris lead before Gordon and Brabham passed them in the second half, with Brabham edging out Gordon for the victory by .0361 seconds. In the third and final round, Gartner led early while Davies climbed through the field after avoiding wrecks. Davies eventually took the lead after the competition caution and pulled away while the field battled among themselves for position.

Prior to the onset of the COVID-19 pandemic, the Boost Mobile Super Trucks planned to run an eight-race schedule in conjunction with the Supercars Championship starting with the Adelaide 500 in late February. The trucks also planned to race in New Zealand for the first time at Hampton Downs Motorsport Park; the event was initially planned to take place at Pukekohe Park Raceway, but Pukekohe legislation forbade motorsports on Anzac Day (25 April).

Although the series had hoped to follow the Supercars Championship to postponed races once new races were finalised, the trucks ultimately did not join the Supercars at their revised dates.

== Results and standings ==
=== Race results ===
Round	Race	Event	Fastest qualifier	Pole position	Winning driver	Ref
1	1	Adelaide	(Australia) Matthew Brabham	(United States) Robby Gordon	(United States) Robby Gordon	
1	2	Adelaide	(Australia) Matthew Brabham	(Australia) Matt Mingay	(Australia) Matthew Brabham	
1	3	Adelaide	(Australia) Matthew Brabham	(Australia) Greg Gartner	(Australia) Shae Davies	

=== Drivers' championship ===
Points are approximate based on the SST points system and unofficial as the series did not track standings for the 2020 season.

Rank	Driver	(Australia) ADE			Points
1	(Australia) Toby Price	2	5	6	71
2	(Australia) Shae Davies	4	10	1	67
3	(Australia) Paul Morris	6	3*	5	60
4	(Australia) Paul Weel	5	4	7	56
5	(Australia) Greg Gartner	8	12	**4***	44
6	(Australia) Luke van Herwaarde	9	7	8	39
7	(Australia) Matt Mingay	12	**6**	12	33
8	(United Kingdom) Shaun Richardson	11	9	11	32
Stadium Super Trucks drivers
	(United States) Robby Gordon	**1***	2	2	
	(Australia) Matthew Brabham	3	1	3	
	(United States) Bill Hynes	7	11	9	
	(United States) Sara Price	10	8	10	
Rank	Driver	(Australia) ADE			Points

Legend
Color	Result
Gold	Winner
Silver	2nd place
Bronze	3rd place
Green	4th–5th place (Top 5)
Light Blue	6th–10th place (Top 10)
Dark Blue	Finished (Outside Top 10)
Purple	Did not finish (DNF)
Red	Did not qualify (DNQ)
Brown	Withdrew (Wth)
Black	Disqualified (DSQ)
White	Did not start (DNS)
White	Race cancelled or abandoned (C)
Blank	Did not participate (DNP)
Blank	Driver replacement (Rpl)
Blank	Race not held (NH)
Blank	Not competing

**In-line notation**
**Bold**	Pole position (1 point; except Indy)
Italics	Ran fastest race lap
^{L}	Led race lap (1 point)
*	Led most race laps (2 points)
^{1–12}	Indy 500 "Fast Twelve" bonus points
^{c}	Qualifying canceled (no bonus point)
RY	Rookie of the Year
R	Rookie

Points	Position														
Points	1st	2nd	3rd	4th	5th	6th	7th	8th	9th	10th	11th	12th	13th	14th	15th
Heat	12	10	8	7	5	4	3	2	1						
Final	25	22	20	18	16	15	14	13	12	11	10	9	8	7	6

Bonuses
Most laps led	3
Position gained	1
Fastest qualifier	1

== See also ==
- Impact of the COVID-19 pandemic on motorsport
