= Bo LeMastus =

American auto racing driver

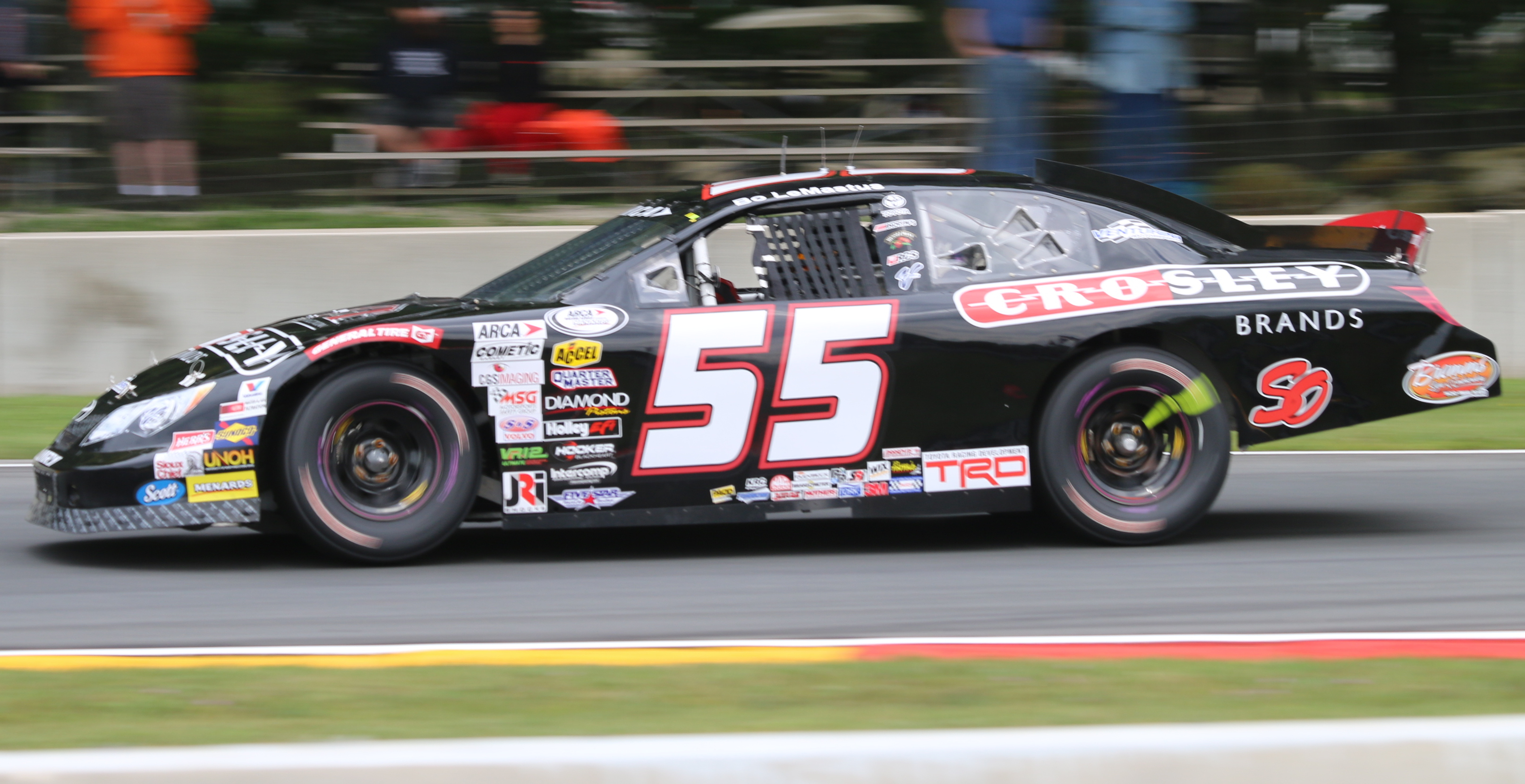
- LeMastus racing in ARCA at Road America in 2017
- Full name: James LeMastus
- Born: January 8, 1963 (age 63) Jasper, Indiana, U.S.

Stadium Super Trucks career
- Debut season: 2021
- Car number: 42
- Starts: 8
- Wins: 0
- Podiums: 0
- Poles: 0
- Best finish: 9th in 2021
- Finished last season: 9th (2021)

NASCAR FedEx Freight Truck Series career
- 12 races run over 1 year
- 2018 position: 27th
- Best finish: 27th (2018)
- First race: 2018 NextEra Energy Resources 250 (Daytona)
- Last race: 2018 JAG Metals 350 (Texas)
Wins	Top tens	Poles
0	0	0

Previous series
- 2013–2018: ARCA Racing Series
- Statistics up to date as of December 9, 2021.

James "Bo" LeMastus (born January 8, 1963) is an American businessman, professional racing driver, and former team owner. He races in the Stadium Super Trucks and formerly competed in the NASCAR Camping World Truck Series and ARCA Racing Series. He was also the co-owner of DGR-Crosley until 2021.

LeMastus is the CEO of Crosley Brands.

== Business career ==
LeMastus began as an intern at Modern Marketing Concepts in 1983, while studying for a business degree at Western Kentucky University. LeMastus later became CEO of the company. In 1994, the company acquired the Crosley name from the former company operated by Powel Crosley Jr.

In October 1998, LeMastus and a group of investors purchased the defunct Charlestown Motor Speedway stock car track in Indiana, converting it into the Podium One Motoplex motocross track. In 2018, LeMastus purchased Salem Speedway and the adjacent Salem Municipal Airport in Indiana, partnering with fellow ARCA drivers Bill and Will Kimmel in the venture.

== Racing career ==
=== Early career ===
LeMastus initially competed in the AMA Motocross Championship from 1987 to 1999. He later competed in Sports Car Club of America-sanctioned road course racing.

=== Stock car racing ===
In 2013, LeMastus purchased the equipment of Mark Gibson Racing and made his stock car debut at Daytona International Speedway in the ARCA Racing Series. He ran his first full season in the series in 2015, finishing sixth in points.

In 2018, LeMastus made his debut in the season-opener at Daytona. He was involved in a pile-up, and ended up finishing 30th after starting 16th. LeMastus continued to own DGR-Crosley with David Gilliland until 2021, though he remained involved in the team in a marketing role.

=== Off-road racing ===
In 2021, LeMastus joined the Stadium Super Trucks weekend at the Grand Prix of St. Petersburg. His series debut ended with his truck flipping and sliding into the wall, which resulted in a red flag that cut nearly half the race distance due to time constraints. At the first Mid-Ohio Sports Car Course weekend in June, he was involved in a fight with Bill Hynes in response to LeMastus' aggressive driving style towards Max Gordon, resulting in LeMastus throwing his steering wheel at Hynes before Hynes threw LeMastus' helmet to the ground twice. LeMastus increased his SST involvement for August's Music City Grand Prix as Crosley provided naming rights for the series, dubbing it the Crosley Stadium Super Trucks, and sponsored him and four other drivers (Jacob Abel, Arie Luyendyk Jr., Ricky Johnson, Jeff Ward).

== Motorsports career results ==
=== NASCAR ===
(key) (Bold – Pole position awarded by qualifying time. Italics – Pole position earned by points standings or practice time. * – Most laps led.)

==== Camping World Truck Series ====
NASCAR Camping World Truck Series results
Year	Team	No.	Make	1	2	3	4	5	6	7	8	9	10	11	12	13	14	15	16	17	18	19	20	21	22	23	NCWTC	Pts	Ref
2018	DGR-Crosley	54	Toyota	DAY; 30	ATL; 17	LVS	MAR	DOV	KAN; 19					CHI; 15	KEN; 20	ELD	POC; 20			MSP; 22		TAL; 29	MAR	TEX; 32	PHO	HOM	27th	168	
2018	DGR-Crosley	17	Toyota							CLT; DNQ	TEX; 26	IOW	GTW					MCH; 17	BRI		LVS; 30						27th	168	

=== ARCA Racing Series ===
(key) (Bold – Pole position awarded by qualifying time. Italics – Pole position earned by points standings or practice time. * – Most laps led.)

ARCA Racing Series results
Year	Team	No.	Make	1	2	3	4	5	6	7	8	9	10	11	12	13	14	15	16	17	18	19	20	21	ARSC	Pts	Ref
2013	Crosley Sports Group	42	Dodge	DAY; 16	MOB; 21	SLM; 17	TAL; 31	TOL; 32	ELK; Wth	POC	MCH	ROA; 19	WIN	CHI	NJE	POC	BLN	ISF	MAD	DSF	IOW	SLM	KEN	KAN	30th	905	
2014	Crosley Sports Group	42	Dodge	DAY	MOB	SLM	TAL	TOL	NJE	POC	MCH	ELK	WIN	CHI	IRP	POC	BLN	ISF	MAD	DSF	SLM	KEN; 18	KAN; 13		56th	305	
2015	Crosley Sports Group	42	Dodge	DAY; 23	MOB; 20	NSH; 14	SLM; 21	TAL; 9	TOL; 15	NJE; 12	POC; 13	MCH; 10	CHI; 17	WIN; 17	IOW; 13	IRP; 17		BLN; 22		DSF; 17		KEN; 10	KAN; 18		6th	4120	
2015	Crosley Sports Group	42	Toyota														POC; 8		ISF; 11		SLM; 9				6th	4120	
2016	Crosley Sports Group	42	Dodge	DAY; 6			TAL; 26		NJE; 19																19th	1380	
2016	Crosley Sports Group	42	Toyota		NSH; 10	SLM; 15		TOL; 10		POC; 17	MCH; 33	MAD	WIN	IOW	IRP	POC	BLN	ISF	DSF	SLM	CHI	KEN	KAN		19th	1380	
2017	Crosley Sports Group	42	Dodge	DAY; 25	NSH	SLM	TAL; 10																		22nd	1190	
2017	Crosley Sports Group	42	Toyota					TOL; 12	ELK	POC	MCH	MAD	IOW	IRP	POC		ISF; 22					KEN; 25	KAN		22nd	1190	
2017	Kimmel Racing	69	Toyota													WIN; 11									22nd	1190	
2017	Venturini Motorsports	55	Toyota															ROA; 13	DSF	SLM; 12	CHI				22nd	1190	
2018	Chad Bryant Racing	77	Ford	DAY; 31	NSH	SLM																			84th	175	
2018	DGR-Crosley	54	Toyota				TAL; 26	TOL	CLT	POC	MCH	MAD	GTW	CHI	IOW	ELK	POC	ISF	BLN	DSF	SLM	IRP	KAN		84th	175	

=== Stadium Super Trucks ===
(key) (Bold – Pole position. Italics – Fastest qualifier. * – Most laps led.)

Stadium Super Trucks results
Year	1	2	3	4	5	6	7	8	9	10	SSTC	Pts	Ref
2021	STP; 9	STP; 9	MOH	MOH	**MOH**; 9	MOH; 9	NSH; 11	NSH; 12	LBH; 9	LBH; 8	9th	92	

^{*} Season still in progress
^{1} Ineligible for series points
