= 2021 Boost Mobile Super Trucks =

Second season for the Boost Mobile Super Trucks

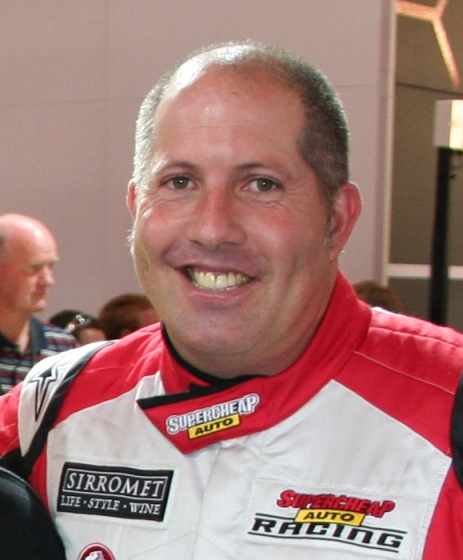
Paul Morris, the 2021 champion

The 2021 Boost Mobile Super Trucks were the second season for the Boost Mobile Super Trucks, an Australian off-road racing series that serves as a counterpart to the Stadium Super Trucks in the United States. Held over three race weekends, the season began at Symmons Plains Raceway on 17–18 April. The series supported Supercars Championship race weekends.

The COVID-19 pandemic resulted in multiple rounds being cancelled. Paul Morris and Shae Davies were tied for the most points accumulated across the three remaining weekends, though Morris won four races to Davies' two for the tiebreaker.

After the season, the trucks were returned to America after the series failed to renew its partnership with Supercars, who were under new ownership. Supercars CEO Shane Howard expressed his interest in bringing them back for 2023, however the trucks would not race in Australia again, until 2024. The series would not come back to Australia in 2025.

== Drivers ==
No.	Driver	Races
11	(Australia) Rob Whyte	4–9
12	(United Kingdom) Shaun Richardson	All
39	(Australia) Russell Ingall	4–6
50	(Australia) Paul Weel	All
66	(Australia) Phillip Foster	7–9
67	(Australia) Paul Morris	All
70	(Australia) Travis Milburn	4–9
87	(Australia) Toby Price	7–9
88	(Australia) Shae Davies	All
94	(Australia) Nash Morris	1, 4–6
94	(Australia) Russell Ingall	2–3
121	(Australia) Dave Casey	All
410	(Australia) Greg Gartner	4–6
Sources: (Note: Entry lists: Tasmania (Races 1–3); Darwin (Races 4–6); Townsville (Races 7–9)) (Note: Changes from the entry lists: Tasmania: Russell Ingall replaced Nash Morris in the No. 94 for Races 2 and 3; Darwin: Nash Morris and the No. 94 replaced Craig Dontas and the No. 45)

== Schedule ==
Much of the 2020 season's schedule was lost to the COVID-19 pandemic, leading to only the season-opening Adelaide 500 being run.

The first confirmed race of 2021 was the Darwin Triple Crown, which was announced in November 2020, in the trucks' first race there since 2017. In March 2021, Speedcafe spoke with series manager Nathan Cayzer, who confirmed a seven-round schedule supporting the Supercars Championship. A Boost Mobile Super Trucks weekend consists of three races, with the first on one day while the other two take place the following day.

Restrictions in response to the pandemic resulted in the Perth SuperNight (originally scheduled for 11–12 September), Auckland SuperSprint (6–7 November), and Gold Coast 500 (4–5 December) being cancelled. The Sydney SuperNight was initially postponed from 21–22 August to 19–21 November before being changed to a four-weekend stretch for the Supercars. Although Supercars CEO Sean Seamer indicated his hope for the trucks to support a round at Sydney, no races took place.

Round	Track	Location	Date	Supporting
1	Symmons Plains Raceway	Launceston, Tasmania	17–18 April	Tasmania SuperSprint
2	Hidden Valley Raceway	Darwin, Northern Territory	19–20 June	Darwin Triple Crown
3	Reid Park Street Circuit	Townsville, Queensland	10–11 July	Townsville 500

=== Races cancelled due to the COVID-19 pandemic ===
Track	Location	Supporting
Wanneroo Raceway	Neerabup, Western Australia	Perth SuperNight
Pukekohe Park Raceway	(New Zealand) Pukekohe, Auckland Region	Auckland SuperSprint
Surfers Paradise Street Circuit	Surfers Paradise, Queensland	Gold Coast 500
Sydney Motorsport Park	Eastern Creek, New South Wales	Sydney SuperNight

== Season summary ==
The season-opening weekend at Symmons Plains Raceway supported the Tasmania SuperSprint; the weekend was initially planned for 10–11 April before being postponed by a week due to COVID-related travel restrictions. The six drivers for the weekend included two newcomers in Nash Morris, the son of Paul Morris, and Dave Casey, who tested a truck in 2020; however, the younger Morris missed the first race due to back pain and was relieved by Russell Ingall for the rest of the weekend. Paul Morris won two of the first three races while Shae Davies won the third.

The second weekend at the Darwin Triple Crown saw the returns of Greg Gartner (raced in 2020), Travis Milburn (last raced in 2018), and Rob Whyte (last start in 2016). Paul Weel flipped in the first race after contact with Casey resulted in a poor ramp entry, leading to a one-lap run to the finish as Paul Morris passed Gartner for the win; Morris also won the second race. A healthy Nash Morris, making his debut in a truck originally arranged for Craig Dontas, dominated the third before Davies overtook him in the final chicane as the two approached the finish.

Toby Price began the Reid Park Street Circuit weekend by winning his first career race in his season debut. Weel won the rest of the weekend's races for his maiden victories.

The cancellation of the Gold Coast 500 and exclusion from the Supercars' Sydney tripleheader quietly ended the Boost Mobile Super Trucks season. No season-long standings were properly tracked by the series (though weekend points were kept), though Morris and Davies were mathematically tied for the lead with 93 points apiece; Morris claimed the tiebreaker as he had four wins to Davies' two.

== Results and standings ==
=== Race results ===
Round	Race	Event	Fastest qualifier	Pole position	Winning driver	Ref
1	1	Tasmania	(Australia) Paul Weel	(Australia) Paul Morris	(Australia) Paul Morris	
1	2	Tasmania	(Australia) Paul Weel	(Australia) Shae Davies	(Australia) Paul Morris	
1	3	Tasmania	(Australia) Paul Weel	(Australia) Dave Casey	(Australia) Shae Davies	
2	4	Darwin	(Australia) Shae Davies	(Australia) Dave Casey	(Australia) Paul Morris	
2	5	Darwin	(Australia) Shae Davies	(Australia) Russell Ingall	(Australia) Paul Morris	
2	6	Darwin	(Australia) Shae Davies	(Australia) Dave Casey	(Australia) Shae Davies	
3	7	Townsville	(Australia) Shae Davies	(Australia) Shae Davies	(Australia) Toby Price	
3	8	Townsville	(Australia) Shae Davies	(Australia) Rob Whyte	(Australia) Paul Weel	
3	9	Townsville	(Australia) Shae Davies	(Australia) Rob Whyte	(Australia) Paul Weel	

=== Drivers' championship ===
Rank	Driver	(Tasmania) SYM			(Northern Territory) HID			(Queensland) TOW			Points
1	(Australia) Paul Morris	**1**	1	2	1	1	6	4	6	2	93
2	(Australia) Shae Davies	5	**2**	1	3	2	1	**2**	7	3	93
3	(Australia) Paul Weel	3	3	4	9	5	3	5	1	1	84
4	(United Kingdom) Shaun Richardson	2	4	3	7	3	8	6	3 (Note: Richardson was promoted to the third position from fourth after Milburn was penalised a spot for losing his hood.)	6	75
5	(Australia) Dave Casey	4	6	**5**	**8**	10	**10**	8	5	7	54
6	(Australia) Travis Milburn				4	6	4	3	4 (Note: Milburn finished third in Townsville Race 3, but was penalised a spot for losing his hood and Richardson was promoted to the position from fourth.)	5	53
7	(Australia) Nash Morris	DNS	Rpl^{†}	Rpl^{†}	5	8	2				39
8	(Australia) Rob Whyte				6	7	9	7	**9**	**4**	36
9	(Australia) Toby Price							1	2	9	27
10	(Australia) Greg Gartner				2	4	7				26
11	(Australia) Russell Ingall		5^{†}	6^{†}	10	**9**	5				15
12	(Australia) Phillip Foster							9	8	8	14
Rank	Driver	(Tasmania) SYM			(Northern Territory) HID			(Queensland) TOW			Points

Legend
Color	Result
Gold	Winner
Silver	2nd place
Bronze	3rd place
Green	4th–5th place (Top 5)
Light Blue	6th–10th place (Top 10)
Dark Blue	Finished (Outside Top 10)
Purple	Did not finish (DNF)
Red	Did not qualify (DNQ)
Brown	Withdrew (Wth)
Black	Disqualified (DSQ)
White	Did not start (DNS)
White	Race cancelled or abandoned (C)
Blank	Did not participate (DNP)
Blank	Driver replacement (Rpl)
Blank	Race not held (NH)
Blank	Not competing

**In-line notation**
**Bold**	Pole position (1 point; except Indy)
Italics	Ran fastest race lap
^{L}	Led race lap (1 point)
*	Led most race laps (2 points)
^{1–12}	Indy 500 "Fast Twelve" bonus points
^{c}	Qualifying canceled (no bonus point)
RY	Rookie of the Year
R	Rookie

Position: Points / 1st / 2nd / 3rd / 4th / 5th / 6th / 7th / 8th / 9th / 10th / 11th / 12th; Points / 12 / 11 / 10 / 9 / 8 / 7 / 6 / 5 / 4 / 3 / 2 / 1	Bonuses: Fastest qualifier / 1

==== Driver replacements ====
Key	No.	Original driver	Replacement driver	Race	Ref
†	94	Nash Morris	Russell Ingall	Tasmania	
All points scored by the replacement went to the original driver.
