= 2020 Stadium Super Trucks =

Sports season

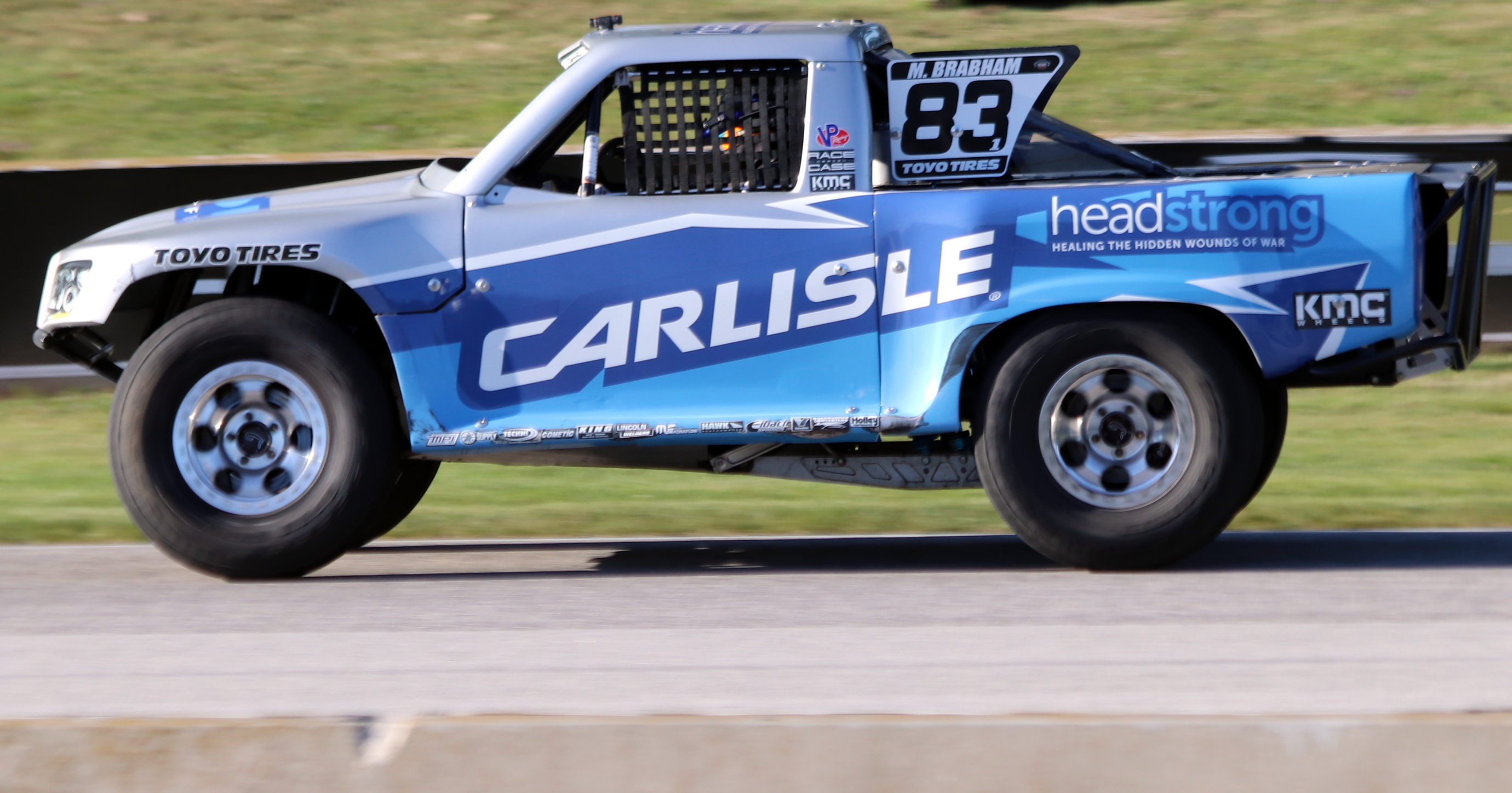
Matthew Brabham, the reigning series champion

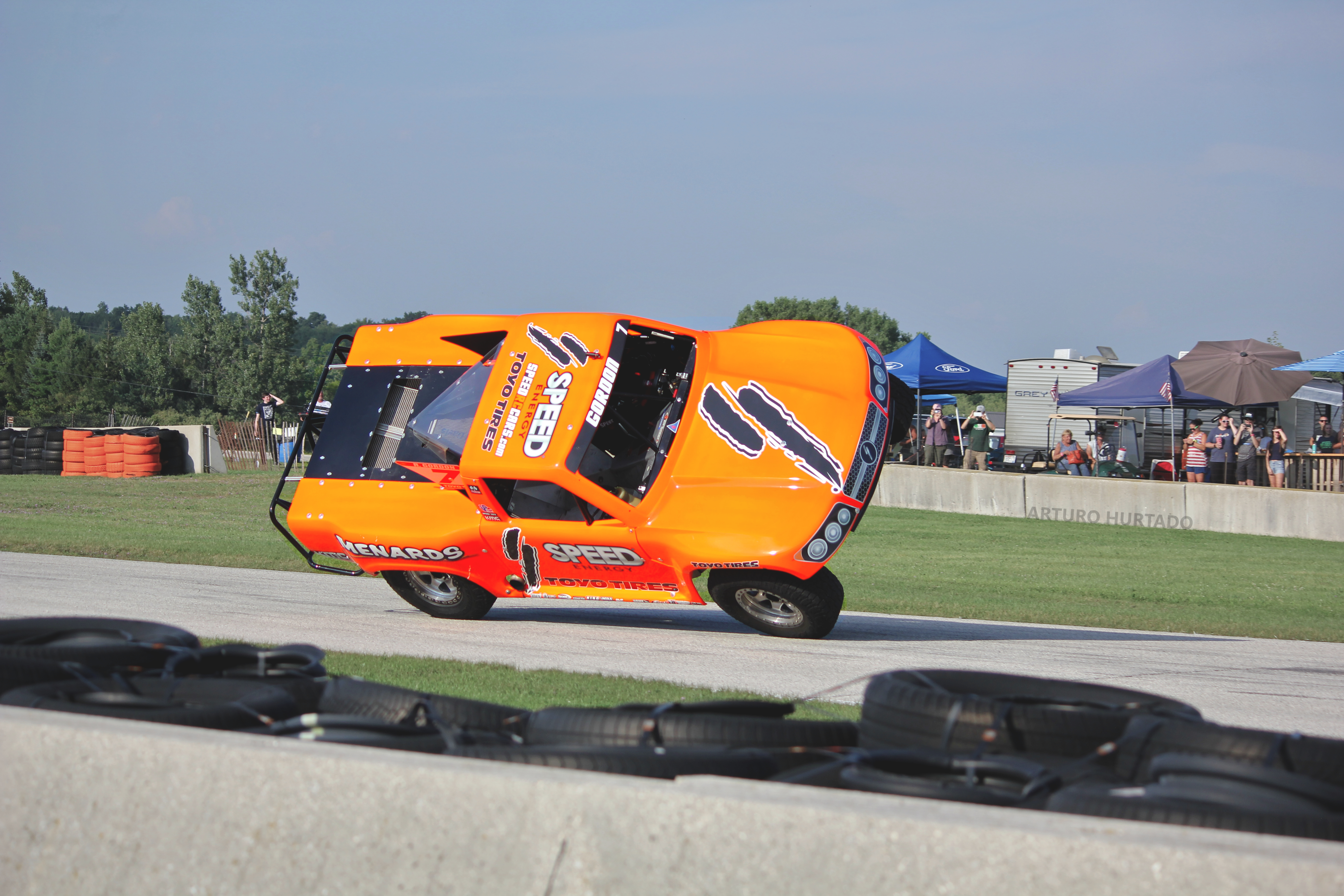
While standings were not kept for the 2020 season, Robby Gordon was the lone driver to finish on the podium in every race

The 2020 Speed Energy Stadium Super Trucks were the eighth season of the Stadium Super Trucks and the first in which the series was split into two championships, with the Speed Energy Stadium Super Trucks in the United States and the Boost Mobile Super Trucks in Australia.

Much of the series' calendar after the season-opening Adelaide 500 in February—held as a combination event with the Boost Mobile Super Trucks—was wiped out by the COVID-19 pandemic. After a six-month hiatus, the trucks returned in August at Road America. Standings were not officially tracked by the series, but Robby Gordon was the lone driver to record podium finishes in every race while reigning champion Matthew Brabham won twice.

== Drivers ==
No.	Driver	Races
2	(United States) Sheldon Creed	4–5
7	(United States) Robby Gordon	All
21	(United States) Zoey Edenholm	4–5
25	(United States) Arie Luyendyk Jr.	4–5
32	(United States) Barry Boes	4–5
44	(United States) John Holtger	4–5
57	(United States) Bill Hynes	All
66	(United States) Zane Smith	4–5
66x	(United States) Jett Noland	4–5
77	(United States) Max Gordon	4–5
78	(United States) Sara Price	1–3
83	(Australia) Matthew Brabham	All
Sources: (Note: Entry lists: Adelaide (Races 1–3); Road America (Races 4–5))

== Schedule ==
The full schedule was revealed on November 21, 2019, with the series being divided into the American Speed Energy Stadium Super Trucks and the Australian Boost Mobile Super Trucks; both championships intended to run three combination rounds.

Round	Track	Location	Date	Supporting
1	**Adelaide Street Circuit**	**Adelaide, South Australia**	February 21–23	Adelaide 500
2	Road America	(United States) Elkhart Lake, Wisconsin	August 8	Henry 180
Combination races with Boost Mobile Super Trucks listed in bold

=== Races canceled due to the COVID-19 pandemic ===
Track	Location	Supporting	Ref
Long Beach Street Circuit	(United States) Long Beach, California	Grand Prix of Long Beach	
**Wanneroo Raceway**	**Neerabup, Western Australia**	Perth SuperNight	
Exhibition Place	(Canada) Toronto, Ontario	Honda Indy Toronto	
Portland International Raceway	(United States) Portland, Oregon	Grand Prix of Portland	
Mid-Ohio Sports Car Course	(United States) Lexington, Ohio	Honda Indy 200	
**Surfers Paradise Street Circuit**	(Australia) **Surfers Paradise, Queensland**	Gold Coast 600	
Lake Elsinore Diamond	(United States) Lake Elsinore, California	Standalone	

== Season summary ==
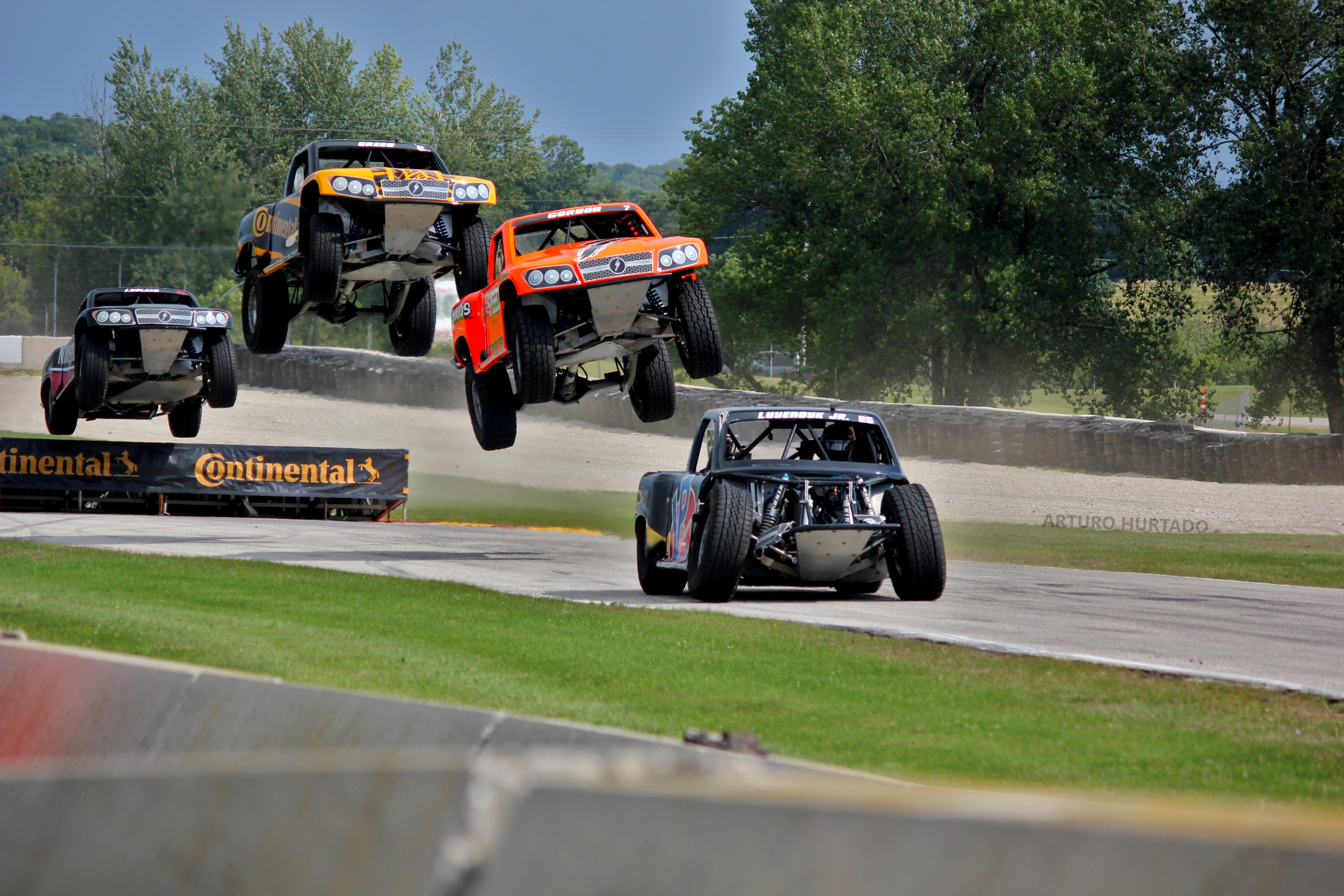
Arie Luyendyk Jr. leading at Road America

The 2020 season began with a combination race weekend with the Boost Mobile Super Trucks at Adelaide Street Circuit. The weekend, which was promoted as an "Australia v USA Series", saw eight Australian drivers and three Americans (defending champion Matthew Brabham holds dual citizenship with both countries). Robby Gordon and Bill Hynes, who ran the full 2019 schedule, returned for Adelaide; fellow American Sara Price made her SST return after last racing in 2017. Gordon won Race 1 after starting first (he did not set a qualifying time due to steering problems, placing him on pole position due to an inverted grid) and holding off a charge by Toby Price on the final turn. Matt Mingay and Paul Morris dominated the second race until Gordon and Brabham passed them late in the event; the two ran side by side to the finish with Brabham winning by just 0.0361 seconds. Shae Davies, a series newcomer, won the final race after avoiding early wrecks and distancing himself from the field as they fought for position.

Due to the COVID-19 pandemic, the Grand Prix of Long Beach, originally scheduled for April 18–19, was canceled, ending a nine-year streak for SST at the street circuit dating back to the series' inaugural season in 2013. The combination Perth SuperNight at Wanneroo Raceway on May 16–17 was postponed; although SST intended to commit to ae rescheduled date, the event was never rescheduled. Another combination weekend with the Gold Coast 600 on October 31–November 1 was excluded from the revised Supercars schedule in May. On May 18, Honda Indy Toronto was removed from its July 11–12 date after local legislation expanded the city's ban on major events through the month, with race officials originally planning to find a new date; the event was also never rescheduled. The Grand Prix of Portland, planned for September 5–6, was called off on July 27, followed by the Honda Indy 200 (August 7–9) at Mid-Ohio Sports Car Course being postponed on August 1.

After a six-month dormancy, the season resumed in early August at Road America as a support event for the NASCAR Xfinity Series. Five drivers made their series debuts during the weekend: Barry Boes (Trans-Am Series), Gordon's son Max, Jett Noland and Zane Smith (NASCAR Gander RV & Outdoors Truck Series), and Zoey Edenholm (Formula 4 United States Championship). John Holtger, whose SST debut came at the track in 2019, Arie Luyendyk Jr., and two-time SST champion Sheldon Creed also returned to the trucks. Luyendyk won the first race after rolling over early in the event, while Brabham beat out Gordon to win the second.

The series initially planned to return to Lake Elsinore Diamond, which held races in 2017 and 2018, in October before it was called off.

== Results and standings ==
=== Race results ===
Round	Race	Event	Fastest qualifier	Pole position	Most laps led	Winning driver	Ref
1	1	Adelaide	(Australia) Matthew Brabham	(United States) Robby Gordon	(United States) Robby Gordon	(United States) Robby Gordon	
1	2	Adelaide	(Australia) Matthew Brabham	(Australia) Matt Mingay	(Australia) Paul Morris	(Australia) Matthew Brabham	
1	3	Adelaide	(Australia) Matthew Brabham	(Australia) Greg Gartner	(Australia) Greg Gartner	(Australia) Shae Davies	
2	4	Road America	(Australia) Matthew Brabham	(United States) Zoey Edenholm	(United States) Arie Luyendyk Jr.	(United States) Arie Luyendyk Jr.	
2	5	Road America	(Australia) Matthew Brabham	(United States) Bill Hynes	(Australia) Matthew Brabham	(Australia) Matthew Brabham	

=== Drivers' championship ===
Points are approximate based on the points system and unofficial as the series did not track standings for the 2020 season.

Rank	Driver	(Australia) ADE			(United States) ROA		Points
1	(United States) Robby Gordon	**1***	2	2	3	2	147
2	(Australia) Matthew Brabham	3	1	3	11	1*	133
3	(United States) Bill Hynes	7	11	9	10	**10**	58
4	(United States) Sheldon Creed				2	3	55
5	(United States) Arie Luyendyk Jr.				1*	9	44
6	(United States) Jett Noland				6	4	35
7	(United States) Sara Price	10	8	10			35
8	(United States) Zane Smith				5	6	34
9	(United States) John Holtger				4*	11	32
10	(United States) Max Gordon				9	5	28
11	(United States) Barry Boes				8	7	27
12	(United States) Zoey Edenholm				**7**	8	27
Boost Mobile Super Trucks drivers
	(Australia) Toby Price	2	5	6			
	(Australia) Shae Davies	4	10	1			
	(Australia) Paul Morris	6	3*	5			
	(Australia) Paul Weel	5	4	7			
	(Australia) Greg Gartner	8	12	**4***			
	(Australia) Luke van Herwaade	9	7	8			
	(Australia) Matt Mingay	12	**6**	12			
	(United Kingdom) Shaun Richardson	11	9	11			
Rank	Driver	(Australia) ADE			(United States) ROA		Points

Legend
Color	Result
Gold	Winner
Silver	2nd place
Bronze	3rd place
Green	4th–5th place (Top 5)
Light Blue	6th–10th place (Top 10)
Dark Blue	Finished (Outside Top 10)
Purple	Did not finish (DNF)
Red	Did not qualify (DNQ)
Brown	Withdrew (Wth)
Black	Disqualified (DSQ)
White	Did not start (DNS)
White	Race cancelled or abandoned (C)
Blank	Did not participate (DNP)
Blank	Driver replacement (Rpl)
Blank	Race not held (NH)
Blank	Not competing

**In-line notation**
**Bold**	Pole position (1 point; except Indy)
Italics	Ran fastest race lap
^{L}	Led race lap (1 point)
*	Led most race laps (2 points)
^{1–12}	Indy 500 "Fast Twelve" bonus points
^{c}	Qualifying canceled (no bonus point)
RY	Rookie of the Year
R	Rookie

Points	Position														
Points	1st	2nd	3rd	4th	5th	6th	7th	8th	9th	10th	11th	12th	13th	14th	15th
Heat	12	10	8	7	5	4	3	2	1						
Final	25	22	20	18	16	15	14	13	12	11	10	9	8	7	6

Bonuses
Most laps led	3
Position gained	1
Fastest qualifier	1

== See also ==
- Impact of the COVID-19 pandemic on motorsport
