= 2021 Stadium Super Trucks =

Ninth season of Stadium Super Trucks

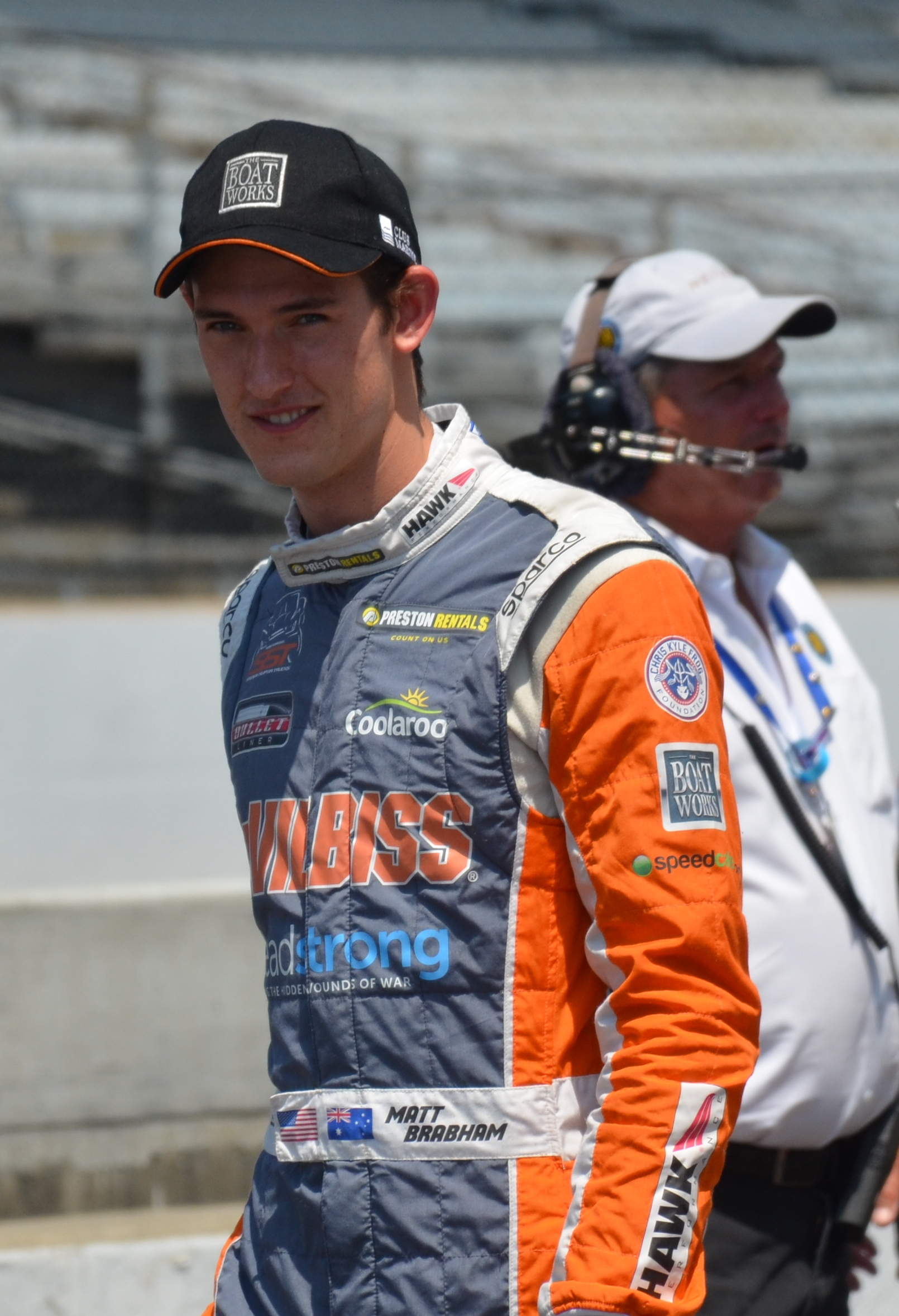
Matthew Brabham, the 2021 champion

The 2021 Stadium Super Trucks were the ninth season of the Stadium Super Trucks. The season began with the St. Petersburg Street Course on April 24–25 and ended at the Long Beach Street Circuit on September 24–26.

Matthew Brabham finished on the podium in each of the ten races and won twice to claim his third consecutive championship. This broke a three-way tie with Robby Gordon and Sheldon Creed for the most titles, and the former finished second in points.

== Drivers ==
No.	Driver	Races
2	(United States) Sheldon Creed	1–4
3	(United States) Aaron Bambach	3–6
4	(United States) Jeff Ward	7–10
5	(United States) Ricky Johnson	7–8
7	(United States) Robby Gordon	All
8	(United States) Brandon Parrish	9–10
9	(United States) Christian Sourapas	9–10
16	(United States) Greg Biffle	3–4
21	(United States) Zoey Edenholm	9–10
22	(United States) Zach Van Matre	7–8
25	(United States) Arie Luyendyk Jr.	1–2, 7–8
27	(United States) Jerett Brooks	5–6, 9–10
28	(United States) Robert Stout	All
31	(United States) Stanton Barrett	7–8
40	(United States) Jacob Abel	7–8
42	(United States) Bo LeMastus	5–10
50	(United States) Jett Noland	1–2, 5–8
51	(United States) Jacob Abel	9–10
57	(United States) Bill Hynes	1–2, 5–10
68	(United States) Bo LeMastus	1–4
77	(United States) Max Gordon	All
83	(Australia) Matthew Brabham	All
96	(Norway) Mads Siljehaug	9–10
Sources: (Note: Entry lists: St. Petersburg (Races 1–2); Mid-Ohio 1 (Races 3–4); Mid-Ohio 2 (Races 5–6); Nashville (Races 7–8); Long Beach (Races 9–10))

== Schedule ==
The Long Beach Street Circuit, which had hosted the trucks since the inaugural season in 2013 but was canceled in 2020 due to the COVID-19 pandemic, returned for 2021. As a precaution with the pandemic ongoing, the race was moved from its traditional April slot to September. The St. Petersburg Street Course, also an IndyCar Series street circuit, returned to the SST schedule for the first time since 2017. June and July weekends at Mid-Ohio Sports Car Course with the NASCAR Xfinity Series and IndyCar, respectively, both of which last took place in 2019, were also added to the slate. The series also joined IndyCar at the inaugural Music City Grand Prix in Nashville.

On March 18, SST announced it had partnered with the newly formed Great American Shortcourse (GAS) series to hold a season finale together in Southern California in November. However, GAS ultimately conducted its own weekend at Glen Helen Raceway without SST involvement while series head Robby Gordon was at the Baja 1000.

Round	Track	Location	Date	Supporting
1	St. Petersburg Street Course	St. Petersburg, Florida	April 24–25	Firestone Grand Prix of St. Petersburg
2	Mid-Ohio Sports Car Course	Lexington, Ohio	June 5–6	B&L Transport 170
3	Mid-Ohio Sports Car Course	Lexington, Ohio	July 3–4	Honda Indy 200
4	Nashville Street Circuit	Nashville, Tennessee	August 6–8	Music City Grand Prix
5	Long Beach Street Circuit	Long Beach, California	September 24–26	Grand Prix of Long Beach

== Season summary ==
In addition to series regulars Gordon, Matthew Brabham, and Bill Hynes, the season opener at St. Petersburg marked the returns of Jett Noland and Gordon's 12-year-old son Max, both of whom debuted in 2020; Arie Luyendyk Jr., who won in the trucks' most recent race weekend; and reigning NASCAR Camping World Truck Series champion Sheldon Creed, the winningest driver in SST history. Robert Stout, a sports car racer and the 2019 Lucas Oil Off Road Racing Series Production 1000 UTV champion, made his SST debut in the first race of a full-time season, while former NASCAR Truck Series driver Bo LeMastus was a late entrant. Creed held off Brabham to win both races.

Preceding the first Mid-Ohio weekend, Xfinity Series driver Justin Allgaier participated in practice and qualifying; he was sixth of eight drivers. Creed won the first race but retired from the second with a transmission failure that enabled Gordon to win. Other drivers in the field included Aaron Bambach, who was running his first race since 2018, and NASCAR Cup Series veteran Greg Biffle. The second weekend at Mid-Ohio saw Hynes return after skipping the first due to scheduling conflicts; Noland and LeMastus also made their returns along with Jerett Brooks, who last made an SST start at the 2019 Race of Champions. Brabham swept the weekend. The end of the first race saw a fight between Hynes and LeMastus regarding LeMastus' aggressive driving against Max Gordon, with LeMastus removing his helmet and throwing his steering wheel at Hynes before the latter spiked the former's helmet.

The Music City Grand Prix weekend saw the returns of Ricky Johnson and Jeff Ward, both of whom last raced in 2013, and the debuts of NASCAR's Stanton Barrett and the Indy Pro 2000 Championship's Jacob Abel. Crosley Brands assumed naming rights for the weekend, which dubbed the series the Crosley Stadium Super Trucks, and sponsored the trucks of LeMastus, Johnson, Ward, Luyendyk, and Abel; Ricky Howerton was initially scheduled to drive before being replaced by Abel. Gordon won the first race while Stout scored his maiden series victory in the second ahead of Abel.

Newcomers at Long Beach included rally raid driver Christian Sourapas, former motorcycle racer Brandon Parrish, and GT4 America Series competitor Mads Siljehaug. Zoey Edenholm, who made her SST debut in 2020, returned to the series. Operating on a "pretty smart" strategy of conserving his brakes, Brooks won the first race after starting at the back. Gordon won the second race to score his fourth victory at Long Beach and break a tie with Brabham for the most at the street circuit.

== Results and standings ==
=== Race results ===
Round	Race	Event	Fastest qualifier	Pole position	Most laps led	Winning driver	Ref
1	1	St. Petersburg	(Australia) Matthew Brabham	(United States) Bill Hynes	(United States) Sheldon Creed	(United States) Sheldon Creed	
1	2	St. Petersburg	(Australia) Matthew Brabham	(United States) Jett Noland	(United States) Sheldon Creed	(United States) Sheldon Creed	
2	3	Mid-Ohio (NASCAR)	(Australia) Matthew Brabham	(United States) Max Gordon	(United States) Sheldon Creed	(United States) Sheldon Creed	
2	4	Mid-Ohio (NASCAR)	(Australia) Matthew Brabham	(United States) Max Gordon	(United States) Robby Gordon	(United States) Robby Gordon	
3	5	Mid-Ohio (IndyCar)	(Australia) Matthew Brabham	(United States) Bo LeMastus	(United States) Jerett Brooks	(Australia) Matthew Brabham	
3	6	Mid-Ohio (IndyCar)	(Australia) Matthew Brabham	(United States) Bill Hynes	(United States) Robert Stout (United States) Robby Gordon	(Australia) Matthew Brabham	
4	7	Nashville	(Australia) Matthew Brabham	(United States) Stanton Barrett	(United States) Robby Gordon	(United States) Robby Gordon	
4	8	Nashville	(Australia) Matthew Brabham	(United States) Ricky Johnson	(United States) Robert Stout	(United States) Robert Stout	
5	9	Long Beach	(United States) Robby Gordon	(United States) Bill Hynes	(United States) Bill Hynes	(United States) Jerett Brooks	
5	10	Long Beach	(United States) Robby Gordon	(Norway) Mads Siljehaug	(United States) Robby Gordon	(United States) Robby Gordon	

=== Drivers' championship ===
Rank	Driver	(Florida) STP		(Ohio) MOH				(Tennessee) NSH		(California) LBH		Points
1	(Australia) Matthew Brabham	2	2	2	3	1	1	2	3	2	3	296
2	(United States) Robby Gordon	4	3	3	1*	4	2*	1*	5	4	1*	270
3	(United States) Robert Stout	6	5	5	4	5	4*	3	1*	3	10	208
4	(United States) Max Gordon	5	7	**7**	**5**	7	5	5	4	5	5	172
5	(United States) Sheldon Creed	1*	1*	1*	7							116
6	(United States) Jerett Brooks					2*	8			1	2	111
7	(United States) Bill Hynes	**7**	8			8	**7**	9	10	**7***	9	106
8	(United States) Jett Noland	8	**6**			6	6	4	8			95
9	(United States) Bo LeMastus	9	9			**9**	9	11	12	9	8	92
10	(United States) Arie Luyendyk Jr.	3	4					7	6			75
11	(United States) Aaron Bambach			6	6	3	3					74
12	(United States) Jeff Ward							6	7	6	7	59
13	(United States) Greg Biffle			4	2							42
14	(United States) Jacob Abel							12	2	13	DNS	39
15	(United States) Christian Sourapas									8	4	32
16	(United States) Brandon Parrish									11	6	25
17	(United States) Stanton Barrett							**8**	11			23
18	(United States) Zach Van Matre							10	9			23
19	(United States) Zoey Edenholm									10	12	20
20	(Norway) Mads Siljehaug									12	**11**	19
21	(United States) Ricky Johnson							13	**13**			16
Rank	Driver	(Florida) STP		(Ohio) MOH				(Tennessee) NSH		(California) LBH		Points

Legend
Color	Result
Gold	Winner
Silver	2nd place
Bronze	3rd place
Green	4th–5th place (Top 5)
Light Blue	6th–10th place (Top 10)
Dark Blue	Finished (Outside Top 10)
Purple	Did not finish (DNF)
Red	Did not qualify (DNQ)
Brown	Withdrew (Wth)
Black	Disqualified (DSQ)
White	Did not start (DNS)
White	Race cancelled or abandoned (C)
Blank	Did not participate (DNP)
Blank	Driver replacement (Rpl)
Blank	Race not held (NH)
Blank	Not competing

**In-line notation**
**Bold**	Pole position (1 point; except Indy)
Italics	Ran fastest race lap
^{L}	Led race lap (1 point)
*	Led most race laps (2 points)
^{1–12}	Indy 500 "Fast Twelve" bonus points
^{c}	Qualifying canceled (no bonus point)
RY	Rookie of the Year
R	Rookie

Points	Position														
Points	1st	2nd	3rd	4th	5th	6th	7th	8th	9th	10th	11th	12th	13th	14th	15th
Heat	12	10	8	7	5	4	3	2	1						
Final	25	22	20	18	16	15	14	13	12	11	10	9	8	7	6

Bonuses
Most laps led	3
Position gained	1
Fastest qualifier	1
