= Max Gordon (racing driver) =

American racing driver

- Nationality: American
- Born: June 10, 2008 (age 18) Orange, California, U.S.
- Relatives: Robby Gordon (father)

Stadium Super Trucks career
- Debut season: 2020
- Car number: 77
- Starts: 32
- Wins: 5
- Podiums: 12
- Poles: 1
- Best finish: 1st in 2025
- Finished last season: 1st (2025)

Championship titles
- 2025
- Statistics up to date as of May 13, 2026.

Max Gordon (born June 10, 2008) is an American professional racing driver who primarily competes in off-road racing such as the Stadium Super Trucks, Best in the Desert, and SCORE International.

Nicknamed "Mad Max", he is the son of driver and SST founder Robby Gordon.

== Racing career ==
Due to his father's own career, Gordon was exposed to racing at a very young age as Robby attached a child safety seat to his off-road buggies when he was two years old. While growing up in the family-run Robby Gordon Motorsports, he helped by gluing lug nuts onto the team's NASCAR Cup Series cars.

Gordon began driving as early as the age of three, piloting a Polaris RZR around the RGM complex. His first racing experience came in karts when he was six in September 2014.

=== Off-road racing ===
Gordon raced in the Baja 1000 for the first time in 2017, though as an unregistered driver due to SCORE International requiring all competitors to be 18 years old; at the age of nine, he was the youngest person to compete in the event. Sharing the No. 2933 UTV Pro Forced Induction entry with Robby, Sheldon Creed, and Todd Romano, Gordon drove the final 325 miles to become the race's youngest de facto finisher, though his ineligibility meant the car was officially classified as a retirement. For the 2018 race, he was the navigator of the No. 77 trophy truck driven by Robby and Cole Potts, finishing 52nd overall and 18th in the class.

In the 2020 Mint 400, Gordon won the UTV Pro Normally Aspirated class but was disqualified for an illegal driver change when Robby replaced him while he was feeling sick.

==== Stadium Super Trucks ====
When Robby founded the Stadium Super Trucks, Max worked as the series' test driver. He made his competitive SST debut in 2020 at Road America, driving the No. 77 with Speed Energy, Speed RC Cars, and Menards as sponsors.

Gordon was one of four drivers to run the full 2021 season. He finished fifth or seventh in all but one race, with the exception being a fourth in the second Music City Grand Prix event. Ahead of the season-ending Grand Prix of Long Beach, he acquired sponsorship from Baja Jerky; he had spent much of the year with Continental Tire and Speed RC Cars as his supporters.

The 2022 season began at Long Beach, where Gordon scored his maiden SST win in the first round after holding off Robby for the victory. In the second and final race, he capitalized on multiple drivers' mistakes to finish third while Robby won to complete a Gordon family sweep of the weekend. Gordon won a second time at Mid-Ohio Sports Car Course when he made an aggressive overtake on the final lap to pass Gavin Harlien and Robert Stout for the lead.

=== Open-wheel racing ===
Gordon has aspirations of competing in Formula One or IndyCar. In January 2022, he began open-wheel racing by competing in the Lucas Oil School of Racing Winter Series at Homestead–Miami Speedway. He finished second in his maiden race.

== Motorsports career results ==
=== Stadium Super Trucks ===
(key) (Bold – Pole position. Italics – Fastest qualifier. * – Most laps led.)

Stadium Super Trucks results
Year	1	2	3	4	5	6	7	8	9	10	SSTC	Pts	Ref
2020	ADE	ADE	ADE	ROA; 9	ROA; 5						N/A^{1}	–	
2021	STP; 5	STP; 7	**MOH**; 7	**MOH**; 5	MOH; 7	MOH; 5	NSH; 5	NSH; 4	LBH; 5	LBH; 5	4th	172	
2022	LBH; 1	LBH; 3	MOH; 7	MOH; 1	NSH; 3	NSH; 7	BRI; 6	BRI; 2			2nd	191	
2023	LBH; 4	LBH; 5	NSH; 3	NSH; 4							5th	87	
2024	LBH; 1*	LBH; 4	ADE; 8	ADE; 3							3rd	93	
2025	LBH; 1*	LBH; 3									1st	62	
2026	LBH; 1*	LBH; 3									-*	-*	

^{*} Season in progress.
^{1} Standings were not recorded by the series for the 2020 season.
