= 2024 Stadium Super Trucks =

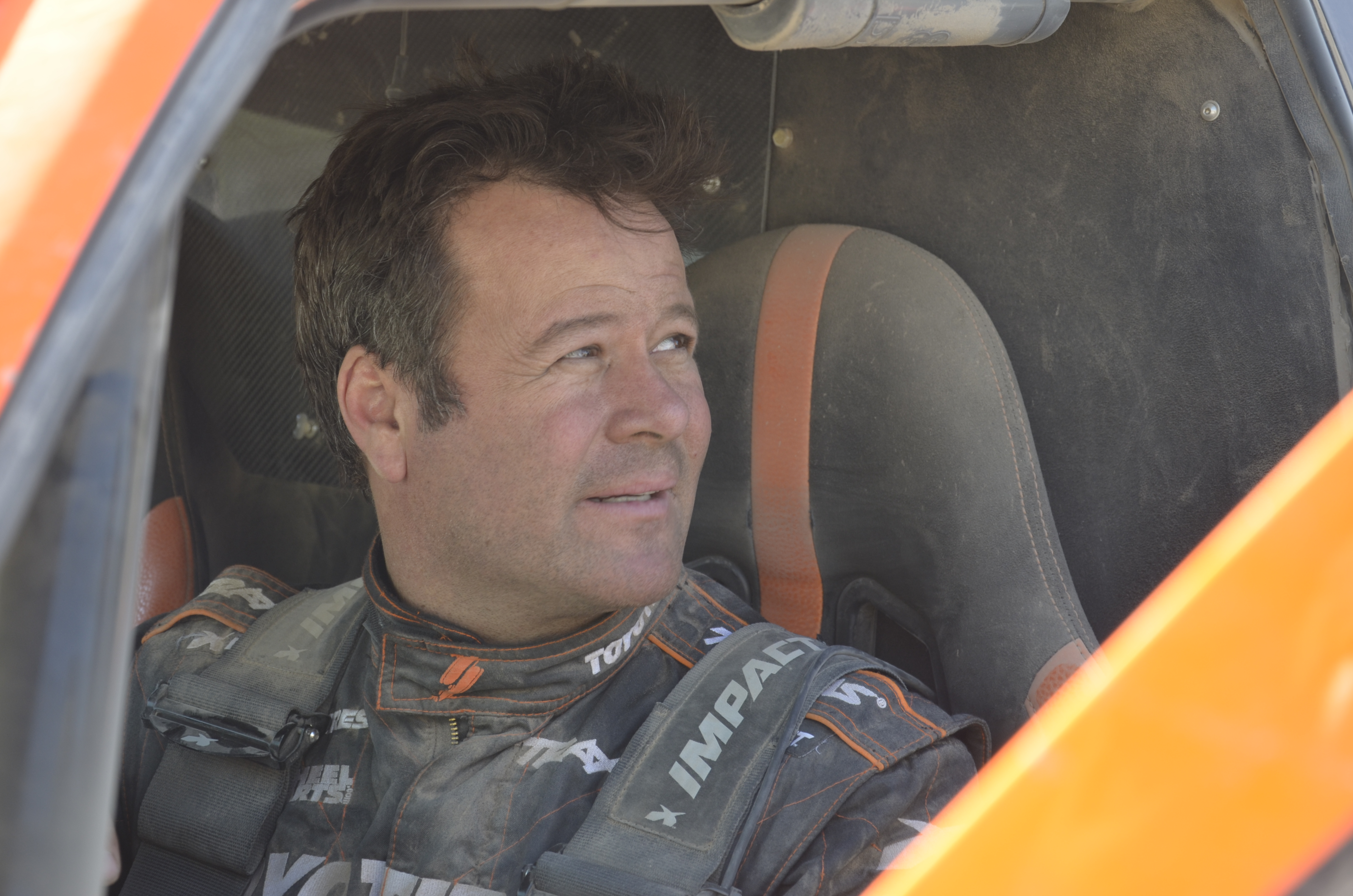
Robby Gordon, the 2024 champion.

The 2024 Stadium Super Trucks were the twelfth season of the Stadium Super Trucks. The season began with the Long Beach Street Circuit and concluded with the Adelaide Street Circuit.

Gavin Harlien entered as the defending champion.

== Drivers ==
No.	Driver	Races
2	(Australia) Matt Mingay	3–4
7	(United States) Robby Gordon	1–4
8	(United States) RJ Stidham	1–2
11	(Australia) Rob Whyte	3–4
12	(Australia) Shaun Richardson	3–4
21	(United States) Zoey Edenholm	1–2
23	(United States) David Bernstein	1–2
25	(Australia) Travis Milburn	3–4
50	(United States) Trey Hernquist	1–2
57	(United States) Bill Hynes	1–2
67	(United States) Ben Maier	1–2
77	(United States) Max Gordon	1–4
83	(Australia) Matthew Brabham	1–4
88	(Australia) Shae Davies	3–4
92	(Australia) Rob Cowie	3–4
957	(United States) Myles Cheek	1–2
Sources: (Note: Entry lists: Long Beach (Races 1–2); Adelaide (Races 3–4))

== Schedule ==
Long Beach, which has hosted SST since the inaugural season in 2013, remained on the schedule for 2024.

In November, the series returned to Australia for the first time since 2021 at the Adelaide Street Circuit. Four races were initially planned before crashes in practice and a hearing with Motorsport Australia to discuss the accidents forced the weekend to be condensed to two qualifying sessions and races each.

Round	Track	Location	Date	Supporting
1	Long Beach Street Circuit	Long Beach, California	April 19–21	Grand Prix of Long Beach
2	Adelaide Street Circuit	Adelaide, South Australia, Australia	November 14–17	Adelaide 500

== Results and standings ==
=== Race results ===
Round	Race	Event	Fastest qualifier	Pole position	Most laps led	Winning driver	Ref
1	1	Long Beach	(United States) Robby Gordon	(United States) David Bernstein	(United States) Max Gordon	(United States) Max Gordon	
1	2	Long Beach	(United States) Robby Gordon	(United States) David Bernstein	(United States) Zoey Edenholm	(United States) Myles Cheek	
2	3	Adelaide	(Australia) Matthew Brabham †	(Australia) Rob Cowie	(Australia) Travis Milburn / (Australia) Shae Davies	(United States) Robby Gordon	
2	4	Adelaide	(Australia) Matthew Brabham †	(Australia) Rob Cowie	(Australia) Shae Davies	(United States) Robby Gordon	

Notes

- † – Two qualifying sessions were held. Robby Gordon had the fastest time in the first while Matthew Brabham did so in the second. Brabham received three bonus points ahead of Robby (two points) and Max Gordon (one point).

=== Drivers' championship ===
Rank	Driver	(California) LBH		(Australia) ADE		Points
1	(United States) Robby Gordon	2	7	1	1	114
2	(Australia) Matthew Brabham	3	2	3	4	101
3	(United States) Max Gordon	1*	4	8	3	93
4	(United States) Myles Cheek	4	1			52
5	(Australia) Shae Davies			4*	2*	50
6	(Australia) Travis Milburn			2*	8	40
7	(United States) Bill Hynes	7	3			35
8	(Australia) Rob Whyte			5	5	32
9	(United States) Ben Maier	6	5			31
10	(United States) Trey Hernquist	5	6			31
11	(Australia) Rob Cowie			**7**	**6**	29
12	(Australia) Shaun Richardson			6	7	29
13	(United States) Zoey Edenholm	8	10*			27
14	(United States) RJ Stidham	9	8			25
15	(United States) David Bernstein	**10**	**9**			23
	(Australia) Matt Mingay			Wth	Wth	–
Rank	Driver	(California) LBH		(Australia) ADE		Points

Legend
Color	Result
Gold	Winner
Silver	2nd place
Bronze	3rd place
Green	4th–5th place (Top 5)
Light Blue	6th–10th place (Top 10)
Dark Blue	Finished (Outside Top 10)
Purple	Did not finish (DNF)
Red	Did not qualify (DNQ)
Brown	Withdrew (Wth)
Black	Disqualified (DSQ)
White	Did not start (DNS)
White	Race cancelled or abandoned (C)
Blank	Did not participate (DNP)
Blank	Driver replacement (Rpl)
Blank	Race not held (NH)
Blank	Not competing

**In-line notation**
**Bold**	Pole position (1 point; except Indy)
Italics	Ran fastest race lap
^{L}	Led race lap (1 point)
*	Led most race laps (2 points)
^{1–12}	Indy 500 "Fast Twelve" bonus points
^{c}	Qualifying canceled (no bonus point)
RY	Rookie of the Year
R	Rookie

Points	Position														
Points	1st	2nd	3rd	4th	5th	6th	7th	8th	9th	10th	11th	12th	13th	14th	15th
Heat	12	10	8	7	5	4	3	2	1						
Final	25	22	20	18	16	15	14	13	12	11	10	9	8	7	6

Bonuses
Most laps led	3
Position gained	1
Fastest qualifier	1
