= 2026 Stadium Super Trucks =

Motorsport season

The 2026 Stadium Super Trucks was the fourteenth season of the Stadium Super Trucks series. The season started with the Long Beach Street Circuit on April 17-19.

Max Gordon entered as the defending champion and won his second championship in a row.

== Drivers ==
No.	Driver	Races
7	(United States) Robby Gordon	1–2
21	(United States) Zoey Edenholm	1–2
28	(United States) J. C. Meynet	1–2
50	(United States) Trey Hernquist	1–2
57	(United States) Bill Hynes	1–2
77	(United States) Max Gordon	1–2
83	(Australia) Matthew Brabham	1–2
357	(United States) Blake Wilkey	1–2
444	(Australia) Shaun Richardson	1–2
957	(United States) Myles Cheek	1–2
Sources: (Note: Entry lists: Long Beach (Races 1–2))

== Schedule ==
Round	Track	Location	Date	Supporting
1	Long Beach Street Circuit	Long Beach, California	April 18–19	Grand Prix of Long Beach

== Results and standings ==
=== Race results ===
Round	Race	Event	Fastest qualifier	Pole position	Most laps led	Winning driver	Ref
1	1	Long Beach	(United States) Myles Cheek	(United States) J. C. Meynet	(United States) Max Gordon	(United States) Max Gordon	
1	2	Long Beach	(United States) Myles Cheek	(Australia) Matthew Brabham	(Australia) Matthew Brabham	(Australia) Matthew Brabham	

=== Drivers' championship ===
Rank	Driver	(California) LBH		Points
1	(United States) Max Gordon	1*	3	63
2	(United States) Robby Gordon	2	2	61
3	(Australia) Matthew Brabham	10	**1***	39
4	(United States) Bill Hynes	4	7	34
5	(Australia) Shaun Richardson	6	4	34
6	(United States) Myles Cheek	5	9	33
7	(United States) Trey Hernquist	3	10	33
8	(United States) Zoey Edenholm	7	5	30
9	(United States) Blake Wilkey	9	6	27
10	(United States) J. C. Meynet	**8**	8	26
Rank	Driver	(California) LBH		Points

Legend
Color	Result
Gold	Winner
Silver	2nd place
Bronze	3rd place
Green	4th–5th place (Top 5)
Light Blue	6th–10th place (Top 10)
Dark Blue	Finished (Outside Top 10)
Purple	Did not finish (DNF)
Red	Did not qualify (DNQ)
Brown	Withdrew (Wth)
Black	Disqualified (DSQ)
White	Did not start (DNS)
White	Race cancelled or abandoned (C)
Blank	Did not participate (DNP)
Blank	Driver replacement (Rpl)
Blank	Race not held (NH)
Blank	Not competing

**In-line notation**
**Bold**	Pole position (1 point; except Indy)
Italics	Ran fastest race lap
^{L}	Led race lap (1 point)
*	Led most race laps (2 points)
^{1–12}	Indy 500 "Fast Twelve" bonus points
^{c}	Qualifying canceled (no bonus point)
RY	Rookie of the Year
R	Rookie

Points	Position														
Points	1st	2nd	3rd	4th	5th	6th	7th	8th	9th	10th	11th	12th	13th	14th	15th
Heat	12	10	8	7	5	4	3	2	1						
Final	25	22	20	18	16	15	14	13	12	11	10	9	8	7	6

Bonuses
Most laps led	3
Position gained	1
Fastest qualifier	1
