= Matt Mingay =

Australian racing driver

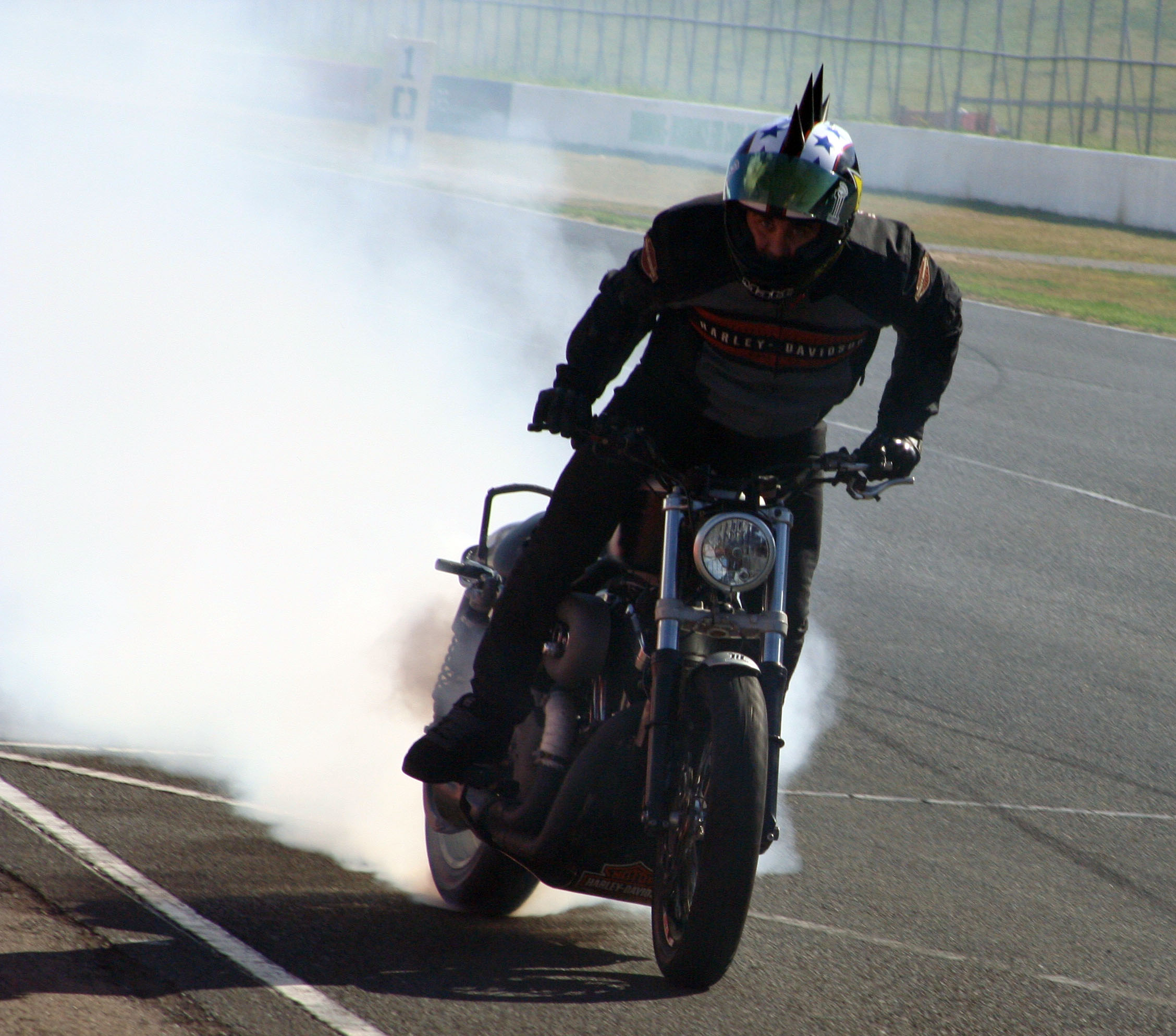
- Nationality: Australian
- Born: 20 March 1977 (age 49) Gold Coast, Queensland

Boost Mobile Super Trucks career
- Debut season: 2020
- Car number: 2
- Starts: 3

Stadium Super Trucks career
- Debut season: 2015
- Starts: 15
- Wins: 1
- Podiums: 3
- Best finish: 9th in 2015
- Finished last season: 16th (2024)
- Statistics up to date as of 14 May 2025.

Matthew Stuart Mingay (born 20 March 1977) is an Australian stunt performer and racing driver. A veteran of the Stadium Super Trucks since 2015, he competes in the series' Australian counterpart Boost Mobile Super Trucks. In 2016, he suffered serious injuries during a Stadium Super Truck race at the Detroit Belle Isle Grand Prix, forcing him out of racing until 2020.

== Career ==
Mingay has worked as a stunt performer since 1998, including being Tom Cruise's stunt double in Mission: Impossible II and appearing in Bollywood productions.

In 2015, Mingay began racing in the Stadium Super Trucks starting at the Adelaide 500 weekend. He finished on the podium in his maiden start, and battled with E. J. Viso for the win in the third race before spinning. At the Gold Coast 600 weekend at Surfers Paradise Street Circuit, Mingay scored his first SST victory. He won again in an exhibition at the Sydney 500.

Mingay returned to SST the following year for the opening weekend at Adelaide, but struggled throughout the three races: in the first race, he suffered a flat tire and finished eleventh; in the second race, his truck erratically jumped off a ramp and barrel rolled five times, leading to a last-place finish; in the final event, he started the race from the pole position, but was spun by Toby Price, resulting in an eighth-place finish. At the second race in Detroit, Mingay's truck flipped on lap three in a wreck. The crash suspended the race and left him in critical but stable condition; he was taken to Detroit Receiving Hospital for facial injuries. He returned to Australia after he recovered, but lost three weeks' worth of memories. In Mingay's place, Robby Gordon drove the No. 2 Hot Wheels truck at the Townsville Street Circuit.

Mingay returned to stunt driving in February 2017, participating in events for the Clipsal 500 at Adelaide. He also attempted to run the weekend's SST races, but the Confederation of Australian Motor Sport's (CAMS) National Medical Advisory Committee requested more medical information that he could not provide in time.

In 2020, Mingay made his return to SST at Adelaide. His first race back saw him spin multiple times and nearly crash into a tyre barrier as he finished 12th, which placed him on the pole for the second race where he ran in the top-two until the competition caution and placed sixth.

Motorsport Australia (formerly CAMS) restored Mingay's racing licence in October 2021. The sanctioning body approved the licence renewal after a nearly five-year process in which he had to participate in neurological examinations such as memory tests and science education.

Mingay was due to rejoin SST for the 2024 Adelaide weekend, but withdrew after a crash in qualifying that rolled his truck and ripped the fuel cell from the vehicle. He was not injured.

== Personal life ==
Mingay and his wife Sheena have two children. His brother Chris is an off-road racer.

A documentary by Brad Day about Mingay's life, including his career and SST accident, titled Mingay: Challenge Accepted, premiered on 10 March 2021.

== Motorsports career results ==
=== Stadium Super Trucks ===
(key) (Bold – Pole position. Italics – Fastest qualifier. * – Most laps led.)

Stadium Super Trucks results
Year	1	2	3	4	5	6	7	8	9	10	11	12	13	14	15	16	17	18	19	20	21	22	SSTC	Pts	Ref
2015	ADE; 3	ADE; 3	ADE; 4	STP	STP	LBH	DET	DET	DET	AUS	TOR	TOR	OCF	OCF	OCF	SRF; 5	SRF; 7	SRF; 4	SRF; 1	SYD; 9	MGM; 9	MGM; 5	9th	192	
2016	ADE; 11	ADE; 12	**ADE**; 8	STP	STP	LBH	LBH	DET; 9	DET; C^{1}	DET	TOW	TOW	TOW	TOR	TOR	CLT	CLT	OCF	OCF	SRF	SRF	SRF	20th	44	

==== Boost Mobile Super Trucks ====
Boost Mobile Super Trucks results
Year	1	2	3	BMSTC	Pts	Ref
2020	ADE; 12	**ADE**; 6	ADE; 12	N/A^{2}	–	
2024	ADE; Wth	ADE; Wth		16th	0	

^{1} The race was abandoned after Mingay's accident.
^{2} Standings were not recorded by the series for the 2020 season.
