= 2017 Stadium Super Trucks =

Sports season

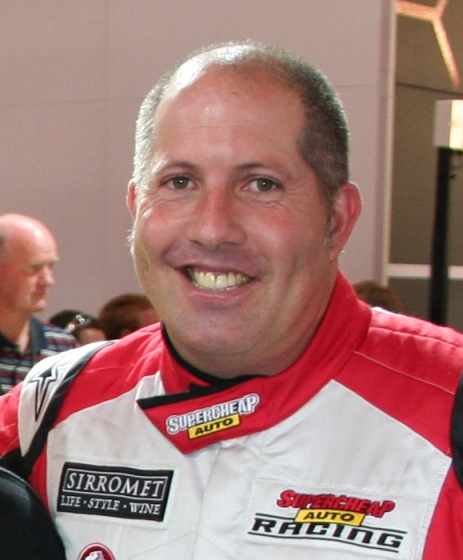
Paul Morris, the 2017 champion

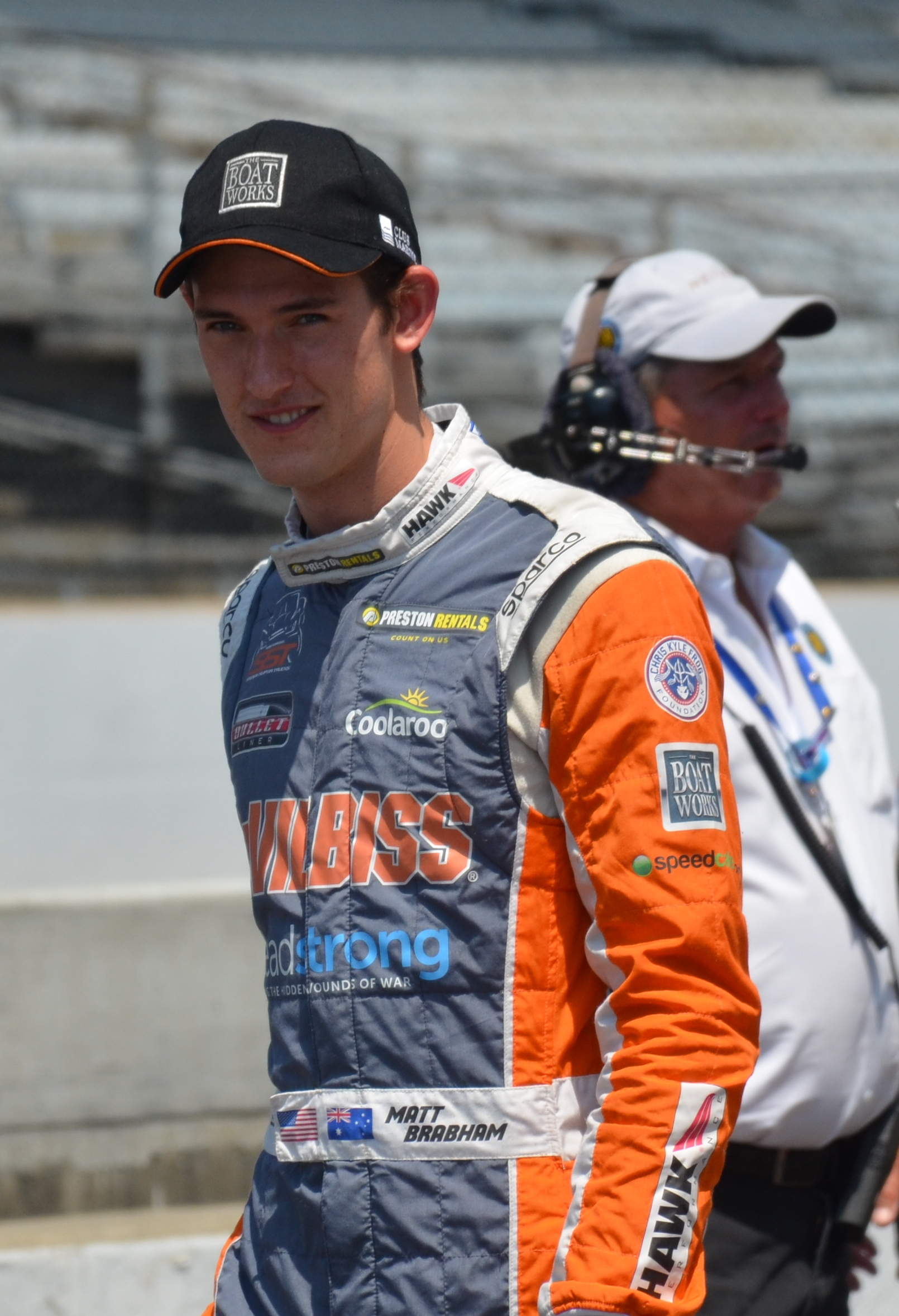
Matthew Brabham, the 2017 runner-up

The 2017 Speed Energy Stadium Super Trucks were the fifth season of the Stadium Super Trucks series. Paul Morris won his first series championship with a one-point advantage over Matthew Brabham.

== Drivers ==
No.	Driver	Races
1	(United States) Sheldon Creed	1–5, 8–14
2	(Australia) Travis Milburn	1–3
2	(United States) Ryan Villopoto	21–22
3	(United States) Aaron Bambach	11–12, 19–20
5	(United States) Casey Mears	21–22
7	(United States) Robby Gordon	1–10, 13–22
7	(United States) Davey Hamilton Jr.	11
10	(United States) Greg Adler	21–22
12	(United Kingdom) Shaun Richardson	8–10
13	(Australia) Beau Robinson	8–10
18	(Mexico) Apdaly Lopez	21–22
25	(United States) Arie Luyendyk Jr.	4–7, 13–14, 18, 21–22
33	(United States) Todd Romano	18
44	(United States) Adam Andretti	21–22
45	(Australia) Craig Dontas	1–3, 8–10, 15–17
47	(United States) Jeff Hoffman	1–3
50	(United States) Jeff Hoffman	12
50:1	(United States) Jeff Hoffman	4–7, 11, 13–22
50:1	(Australia) Travis Milburn	8–10
51	(Brazil) Átila Abreu	11–12
52	(United States) Davey Hamilton Jr.	6–7
55	(United States) Gavin Harlien	All
57	(United States) Bill Hynes	All
67	(Australia) Paul Morris	1–20
67	(United States) Jerett Brooks	21–22
75	(United States) Erik Davis	1–3, 6–7, 11–14, 21–22
75	(United States) Davey Hamilton Jr.	4–5, 18
75	(Australia) Jake Kostecki	8–10
77	(China) Li Ya Tao	18
78	(United States) Sara Price	21–22
83	(Australia) Matthew Brabham	All
87	(Australia) Toby Price	1–3
98	(United States) P. J. Jones	4–6, 13–14
119	(United States) Arie Luyendyk Jr.	11–12
213	(United States) Steve Kendall	19–20
257	(United States) Myles Cheek	6–7
410	(Australia) Greg Gartner	1–3, 8–10, 15–17
441	(United States) Troy Diede	6–7
Sources: (Note: Sorted by round: Adelaide (Races 1–3); St. Petersburg (Races 4–5); Long Beach (Races 6–7); Perth (Races 8–10); Detroit (Races 11–12); Texas (Races 13–14); Darwin (Races 15–17); Beijing (Race 18); Watkins Glen (Races 19–20); Lake Elsinore (Races 21–22))

== Schedule ==
Round	Track	Location	Date	Supporting
1	Adelaide Street Circuit	Adelaide, Australia	March 3–5	Clipsal 500 Adelaide
2	St. Petersburg Street Course	St. Petersburg, Florida	March 11–12	Firestone Grand Prix of St. Petersburg
3	Long Beach Street Circuit	Long Beach, California	April 8–9	Toyota Grand Prix of Long Beach
4	Barbagallo Raceway	Perth, Australia	May 5–7	Perth SuperSprint
5	Raceway at Belle Isle Park	Detroit, Michigan	June 3–4	Chevrolet Detroit Grand Prix
6	Texas Motor Speedway	Fort Worth, Texas	June 10	Rainguard Water Sealers 600
7	Hidden Valley Raceway	Darwin, Australia	June 16–18	Darwin Triple Crown
8	Beijing National Stadium	Beijing, China	July 29	Monster Jam
9	Watkins Glen International	(New York (state)) Watkins Glen, New York	September 2–3	Grand Prix at The Glen
10	Lake Elsinore Diamond	Lake Elsinore, California	December 15	Race & Rock SST World Championship
11	Lake Elsinore Diamond	Lake Elsinore, California	December 16	Race & Rock SST World Championship

== Season summary ==
For the third consecutive year, the new SST season began at Adelaide Street Circuit to support the Supercars Championship's Clipsal 500 Adelaide. Lucas Oil Off Road Racing Series driver Jeff Hoffman made his series debut, while Gavin Harlien ran his first race since 2015. In Race 1, V8 Ute Racing Series racer Craig Dontas, who helped SST establish a following in Australia, started in the second row and quickly took the lead. Although Paul Morris and Matthew Brabham passed Dontas on the final lap, Harlien wrecked after making contact with Erik Davis and flipped, causing the race to be red flagged and Dontas to be declared the race winner. Sheldon Creed beat Toby Price to win Race 2. The final race began with Dontas flipping, leading to a red flag that shortened the race from eight to five laps. Hoffman led the race until Morris passed him and went on to win; Hoffman was eventually involved in a battle with his Royal Purple teammate Harlien, ending when Harlien hit the wall and triggered a wreck that involved Davis, Price, and Travis Milburn.

The trucks' first American race took place with the IndyCar Series' Firestone Grand Prix of St. Petersburg. Sprint car racing driver Davey Hamilton Jr. joined the series for his maiden SST start, driving the No. 75 Always Evolving truck owned by Davis. Although Brabham led much of Race 1, power steering issues and a late spin knocked him out of the win; instead, Robby Gordon and Creed fought for the victory, with the former holding the latter off to win his first race at St. Petersburg since 2014. Brabham rebounded by winning Race 2, the first non-American SST winner at the track.

In January, the Toyota Grand Prix of Long Beach and the series formed a multi-year agreement to continue racing at the street course. Brabham took the weekend victory as he won Race 1 and finished second in Race 2; Gordon won the latter. Myles Cheek, who raced in the series' Super Trophy Kart division in 2013, made his series debut at Long Beach as he finished seventh and eighth, including spinning in Race 2.

Returning to Australia in May, SST's races at Barbagallo Raceway in conjunction with the Perth SuperSprint was their first at a closed circuit. Jake Kostecki ran his first SST weekend in the No. 75, but contact on a ramp with Milburn in Race 1 caused him to roll through the grass; Harlien attempted to dodge Kostecki's truck but stalled his vehicle, eliminating him from the race. Creed avoided the wreck and eventually won the round. Kostecki missed the rest of the weekend due to the damage. Gordon won Race 2, while Creed beat Gordon to the finish in Race 3 by .023 seconds, one of the closest finishes in series history.

Creed's success continued as he swept the two Chevrolet Detroit Grand Prix races. Gordon missed the weekend as he was competing in the Baja 500, with Hamilton serving as the interim No. 7 driver. Stock Car Brasil driver Átila Abreu also made his SST debut at Detroit, driving the No. 51 with sponsorship from his SCB team Shell Oil Company and Monster Energy.

A week after Detroit, the series followed IndyCar to Texas Motor Speedway for the Rainguard Water Sealers 600, where SST raced on a dirt track featuring elements of the infield, pit road, and the frontstretch. As further promotion for the trucks, TMS' turn two held an off-road expo called the "Off-Road Ruckus", which allowed visitors to drive their off-road vehicles along an obstacle course and observe exhibits. P. J. Jones and Creed won the two races, but Harlien claimed the overall weekend victory with third- and second-place finishes.

The trucks' next trip to Australia, the Hidden Valley Raceway in Darwin as part of the Darwin Triple Crown, was their first points racing at the track; in 2016, Morris, Price, and Brad Gallard participated in an SST demonstration at Hidden Valley. Morris won Races 1 and 3 in close battles with Gordon, but Race 2 saw him hit the tire barrier in a chicane and roll over; Brabham won the round. After the weekend, Gordon took a stadium truck to a nightclub in the city, where he performed donuts. He was eventually charged with and pleaded guilty to traffic and anti-hooning violations, leading to a fine, though he defended his actions as he had received prior approval from security guards. The Confederation of Australian Motor Sport (CAMS) revoked Gordon's competition visa for future events, barring him from racing in the country and jeopardizing the series' future. An apology and $10,000 donation to the Australian Road Safety Foundation in October led to the ban being lifted.

In July, SST joined Monster Jam for a round at the Beijing National Stadium, their first trip to Asia since a demo in Mongolia in 2016 and their inaugural Asian points race. Among the ten SST drivers was newcomer Li Ya Tao. Racing on a dirt oval, Hamilton led the most laps and won the race, but was disqualified as he had not taken the Joker Lap; instead, Brabham was declared the winner.

The following month, the series was a part of IndyCar's Grand Prix at The Glen at Watkins Glen International. Officially known as the UFD at The Glen, it was SST's first race in the northeastern United States and first on an American permanent road course. Gordon and Brabham won the weekend's two races.

To close 2017, SST organized the inaugural Race & Rock World Championship at the Lake Elsinore Diamond baseball park. Among those in the field were X Games Austin 2014 gold medalist Apdaly Lopez, female off-road racer Sara Price, NASCAR's Casey Mears, Trans-Am Series veteran Adam Andretti, and four-time AMA Motocross champion Ryan Villopoto. Morris skipped the weekend as he was tending to a rib injury, so he tasked Jerett Brooks with driving his No. 67 truck. Both races were determined by two heats each, with Lopez and Creed winning on Friday; Mears, Davis, Andretti, and Greg Adler failed to qualify for the Friday feature. Lopez went on to win Race 1. Saturday featured heat wins by Creed and Brooks. The two dominated the second half of Race 2, with Brooks' runner-up finish and Brabham's eighth securing the championship for Morris by one point.

== Results and standings ==
=== Race results ===
Round	Race	Event	Fastest qualifier	Pole position	Most laps led	Winning driver	Ref
1	1	Adelaide	(Australia) Matthew Brabham	(United States) Bill Hynes	(Australia) Craig Dontas	(Australia) Craig Dontas	
1	2	Adelaide	(Australia) Matthew Brabham	(United States) Robby Gordon	—N/a	(United States) Sheldon Creed	
1	3	Adelaide	(Australia) Matthew Brabham	(United States) Bill Hynes	—N/a	(Australia) Paul Morris	
2	4	St. Petersburg	(United States) Robby Gordon	(United States) Jeff Hoffman	(United States) Robby Gordon	(United States) Robby Gordon	
2	5	St. Petersburg	(United States) Robby Gordon	(Australia) Matthew Brabham	(Australia) Matthew Brabham	(Australia) Matthew Brabham	
3	6	Long Beach	(Australia) Matthew Brabham	(United States) Bill Hynes	(Australia) Paul Morris	(Australia) Matthew Brabham	
3	7	Long Beach	(Australia) Matthew Brabham	(United States) Troy Diede	(United States) Robby Gordon	(United States) Robby Gordon	
4	8	Perth	(Australia) Matthew Brabham	(Australia) Beau Robinson	(United States) Bill Hynes	(United States) Sheldon Creed	
4	9	Perth	(Australia) Matthew Brabham	(United States) Gavin Harlien	(United States) Gavin Harlien	(United States) Robby Gordon	
4	10	Perth	(Australia) Matthew Brabham	(Australia) Beau Robinson	(United States) Bill Hynes	(United States) Sheldon Creed	
5	11	Detroit	(United States) Gavin Harlien	(United States) Davey Hamilton Jr.	(United States) Sheldon Creed	(United States) Sheldon Creed	
5	12	Detroit	(United States) Gavin Harlien	(Brazil) Átila Abreu	(United States) Sheldon Creed	(United States) Sheldon Creed	
6	13	Texas	(Australia) Paul Morris	(United States) Erik Davis	(United States) P. J. Jones	(United States) P. J. Jones	
6	14	Texas	(Australia) Paul Morris	(United States) Erik Davis	(United States) Sheldon Creed	(United States) Sheldon Creed	
7	15	Darwin	(United States) Robby Gordon	(United States) Bill Hynes	(United States) Robby Gordon	(Australia) Paul Morris	
7	16	Darwin	(United States) Robby Gordon	(United States) Bill Hynes	(Australia) Matthew Brabham	(Australia) Matthew Brabham	
7	17	Darwin	(United States) Robby Gordon	(United States) Bill Hynes	(Australia) Paul Morris	(Australia) Paul Morris	
8	18	Beijing	(Australia) Paul Morris	(United States) Bill Hynes	(United States) Bill Hynes (Note: Davey Hamilton Jr. led the most laps, but his disqualification meant Hynes received the bonus points.)	(Australia) Matthew Brabham	
9	19	Watkins Glen	(Australia) Paul Morris	(United Kingdom) Shaun Richardson	(United States) Robby Gordon	(United States) Robby Gordon	
9	20	Watkins Glen	(Australia) Paul Morris	(United States) Steve Kendall	(Australia) Matthew Brabham	(Australia) Matthew Brabham	
10	H1	Lake Elsinore	(United States) Greg Adler	(United States) Casey Mears	—N/a	(Mexico) Apdaly Lopez	
10	H2	Lake Elsinore	(United States) Greg Adler	(United States) Ryan Villopoto	—N/a	(United States) Sheldon Creed	
10	21	Lake Elsinore	(United States) Greg Adler	(United States) Arie Luyendyk Jr.	(Mexico) Apdaly Lopez	(Mexico) Apdaly Lopez	
11	H1	Lake Elsinore	(United States) Gavin Harlien	(United States) Burt Jenner	(Mexico) Apdaly Lopez	(United States) Sheldon Creed	
11	H2	Lake Elsinore	(United States) Gavin Harlien	(United States) Sara Price	(United States) Adam Andretti		
11	22	Lake Elsinore	(United States) Gavin Harlien	(United States) Robby Gordon	(United States) Sheldon Creed	(United States) Sheldon Creed	

=== Drivers' championship ===
Rank	Driver	(Australia) ADE			(Florida) STP		(California) LBH		(Australia) PER			(Michigan) DET		(Texas) TEX		(Australia) HID			(China) BEI	(New York (state)) GLN		(California) ELS						Points
Rank	Driver	(Australia) ADE			(Florida) STP		(California) LBH		(Australia) PER			(Michigan) DET		(Texas) TEX		(Australia) HID			(China) BEI	(New York (state)) GLN		H1	H2	F1	H1	H2	F2	Points
1	(Australia) Paul Morris	2	4	1	3	7	2*	4	3	4	9	4	4	4	9	1	7	1*	5	2	3	Rpl^{‡}		Rpl^{‡}		Rpl^{‡}	Rpl^{‡}	546
2	(Australia) Matthew Brabham	3	12	2	9	**1***	1	2	10	3	4	3	2	5	3	3	1*	3	1	3	1*		4	5	7		8	545
3	(United States) Robby Gordon	12	**3**	4	1*	3	4	1*	4	1	2			2	4	2*	3	2	2	1*	2		2	3	3		**3**	530
4	(United States) Gavin Harlien	8	7	7	10	6	3	3	11	**2***	3	2	3	3	2	4	2	3	4	4	6		8	4	2		7	459
5	(United States) Sheldon Creed	7	1	5	2	2			1	5	1	1*	1*	9	1*								1	2	1		1*	411
6	(United States) Jeff Hoffman	10	9	3	**7**	8	5	5	Rpl^{†}	Rpl^{†}	Rpl^{†}	6	9	6	5	5	5	4	3	6	4		3	12		5	4	325
7	(United States) Bill Hynes	**11**	10	**11**	8	9	**10**	10	6*	11	5*	9	7	8	10	**8**	**8**	**7**	**8***	7	10		5	11	6		DNQ	279
8	(United States) Arie Luyendyk Jr.				5	4	6	6				10	6	7	8				7			2		**7**		6	9	183
9	(United States) Erik Davis	9	8	8			11	9				8	5	**10**	**7**								7	DNQ		8	DNQ	147
10	(Australia) Greg Gartner	6	6	6					5	7	6					6	6	8										139
11	(Australia) Craig Dontas	1*	11	12					7	8	11					7	5	5										133
12	(Australia) Travis Milburn	5	5	9					2^{†}	6^{†}	8^{†}																	102
13	(United States) P. J. Jones				4	5	9							1*	6													99
14	(United States) Davey Hamilton Jr.				6	10	8	7				**7**							12									76
15	(Australia) Toby Price	4	2	10																								66
16	(United States) Aaron Bambach											5	10								5	5						61
17	(United Kingdom) Shaun Richardson								8	9	10									**9**	8							61
18	(Mexico) Apdaly Lopez																					1		1*		3	11	59
19	(Australia) Beau Robinson								**9**	10	**7**																	37
20	(United States) Ryan Villopoto																						**6**	10	5		10	35
21	(United States) Adam Andretti																					6		DNQ		1	12	34
22	(United States) Casey Mears																					**7**		DNQ		4	5	29
23	(United States) Myles Cheek						7	8																				27
24	(United States) Greg Adler																					8		DNQ	4		6	26
25	(United States) Sara Price																					4		9		**7**	DNQ	25
26	(United States) Burt Jenner																					5		6	**8**		DNQ	25
27	(Brazil) Átila Abreu											11	8															23
28	(United States) Steve Kendall																			10	**9**							23
29	(United States) Troy Diede						12	**DNS**																				19
30	(United States) Todd Romano																		6									15
31	(China) Li Ya Tao																		9									12
32	(Australia) Jake Kostecki								12	DNS	DNS																	9
	(United States) Jerett Brooks																					3^{‡}		8^{‡}		2^{‡}	2^{‡}	

Legend
Color	Result
Gold	Winner
Silver	2nd place
Bronze	3rd place
Green	4th–5th place (Top 5)
Light Blue	6th–10th place (Top 10)
Dark Blue	Finished (Outside Top 10)
Purple	Did not finish (DNF)
Red	Did not qualify (DNQ)
Brown	Withdrew (Wth)
Black	Disqualified (DSQ)
White	Did not start (DNS)
White	Race cancelled or abandoned (C)
Blank	Did not participate (DNP)
Blank	Driver replacement (Rpl)
Blank	Race not held (NH)
Blank	Not competing

**In-line notation**
**Bold**	Pole position (1 point; except Indy)
Italics	Ran fastest race lap
^{L}	Led race lap (1 point)
*	Led most race laps (2 points)
^{1–12}	Indy 500 "Fast Twelve" bonus points
^{c}	Qualifying canceled (no bonus point)
RY	Rookie of the Year
R	Rookie

Points	Position														
Points	1st	2nd	3rd	4th	5th	6th	7th	8th	9th	10th	11th	12th	13th	14th	15th
Heat	12	10	8	7	5	4	3	2	1						
Final	25	22	20	18	16	15	14	13	12	11	10	9	8	7	6

Bonuses
Most laps led	3
Position gained	1
Fastest qualifier	1

==== Driver replacements ====
Key	No.	Original driver	Replacement driver	Race
†	47	Jeff Hoffman	Travis Milburn	Perth
‡	67	Paul Morris	Jerett Brooks	Lake Elsinore
All points scored by the replacement went to the original driver, though Milburn and Hoffman shared the points.
