= 2015 Stadium Super Trucks =

Seasons
- ← 2014 2016 →

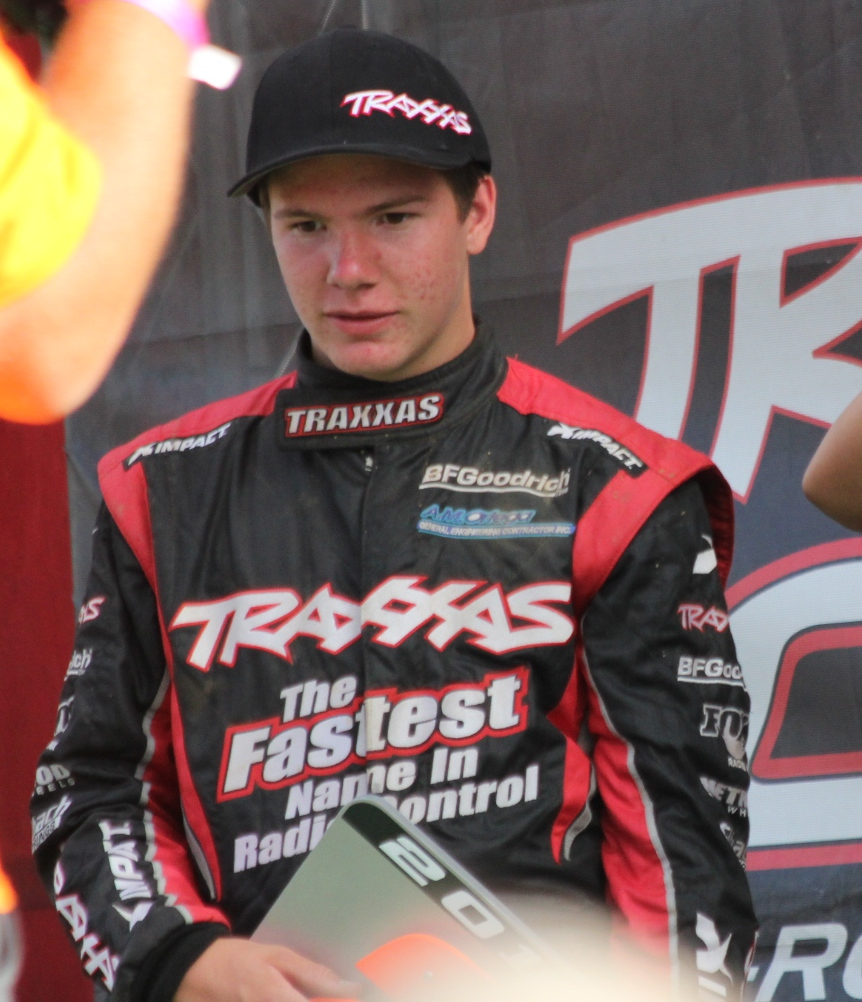
Sheldon Creed, the series champion.

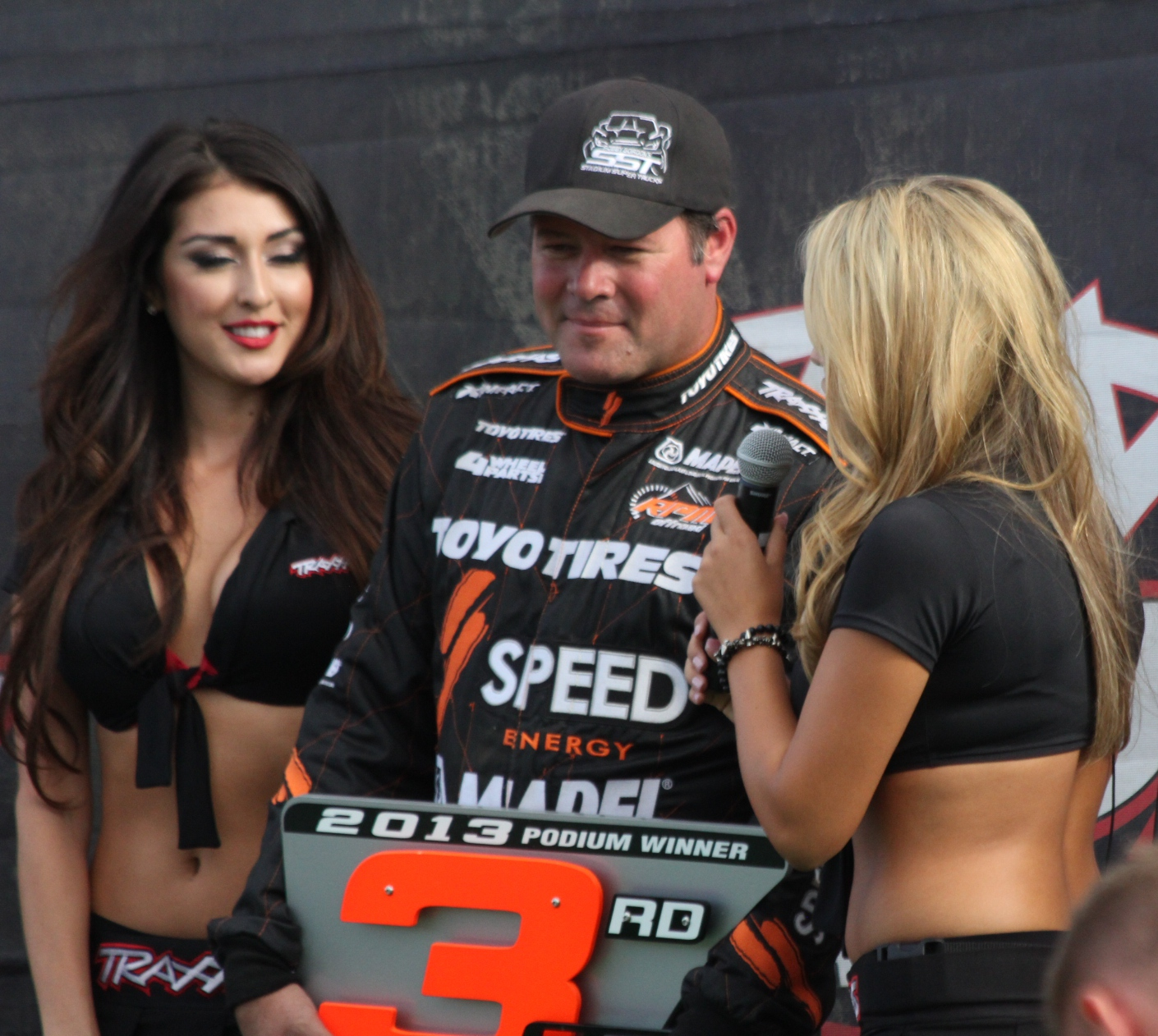
Robby Gordon, the championship runner-up.

The 2015 Stadium Super Trucks, officially the Speed Energy Formula Off-Road presented by Traxxas championship, were the third season of the Stadium Super Trucks. Sheldon Creed won the championship.

2015 was the first season in which the trucks began racing in Australia.

== Drivers ==
No.	Driver	Races
2	(Australia) Matt Mingay	1–3, 16–22
2	(United States) Rusty Wallace	10
3	(United States) Charles Dorrance	1–6, 8–15, 21–22
3	(United States) Larry Job	9
5	(Venezuela) E. J. Viso	1–12
5	(New Zealand) Mike Whiddett	13–15
5	(Australia) Danny Reidy	20
7	(United States) Robby Gordon	All
10	(United States) Greg Adler	21–22
12	(United States) Augie Lerch	13–15
14	(Australia) Greg Gartner	16–20
17	(Mexico) Lalo Laguna	4–5
17	(United States) Dale Dondel	6
18	(Mexico) Apdaly Lopez	6, 10
25	(United States) Arie Luyendyk Jr.	7–10
27	(Australia) Matthew Brabham	11–12, 16–20
33	(United States) C. J. Greaves	10
47	(United States) Keegan Kincaid	1–12, 16–22
47	(United States) P. J. Jones	13–15
48	(United States) Scotty Steele	4–22
50	(United States) Burt Jenner	4–6
51	(United States) Aaron Kaufman	13–14
54	(United States) Boris Said	10
55	(United States) Gavin Harlien	6
56	(Australia) Nathan Pretty	1–3, 10, 15–16, 17
57	(United States) Bill Hynes	All
67	(Australia) Paul Morris	16–20
69	(Australia) Brett Thomas	16–19
74	(United States) Sheldon Creed	1–6, 10–22
74	(United States) P. J. Jones	7–9
75	(United States) Erik Davis	4–6
77	(United States) Jerett Brooks	10
87	(Australia) Toby Price	1, 3
87	(Australia) Billy Geddes	2
87	(United States) Aaron Bambach	7–9
88	(United States) Jeremy Stenberg	10
93	(Canada) Russell Boyle	11–12
99	(United States) Kyle LeDuc	6, 10
199	(United States) Travis Pastrana	10
454	(Australia) Brad Gallard	1–3
777	(France) Anthony Gandon	21–22
Sources: (Note: Sorted by round: Adelaide (Races 1–3); St. Petersburg (Races 4–5); Long Beach (Race 6); Detroit (Races 7–9); X Games (Race 10); Toronto (Races 11–12); Costa Mesa (Races 13–15); Surfers Paradise (Races 16–19); Granville (Race 20); Las Vegas (Races 21–22))

== Schedule ==
Round	Track	Location	Date	Supporting
1	Adelaide Street Circuit	Adelaide, Australia	February 27–March 1	Clipsal 500
2	St. Petersburg Street Course	St. Petersburg, Florida	March 28–29	Firestone Grand Prix of St. Petersburg
3	Long Beach Street Circuit	Long Beach, California	April 19	Toyota Grand Prix of Long Beach
4	Raceway at Belle Isle Park	Detroit, Michigan	May 29–31	Chevrolet Detroit Belle Isle Grand Prix
5	Circuit of the Americas	Austin, Texas	June 7	X Games Austin
6	Exhibition Place	(Canada) Toronto, Ontario	June 13–14	Honda Indy Toronto
7	OC Fair & Event Center	Costa Mesa, California	September 18–20	Sand Sports Super Show
8	Surfers Paradise Street Circuit	Surfers Paradise, Australia	October 23–25	Gold Coast 600
9	Valvoline Raceway	Granville, Australia	October 31	Ultimate Sprintcar Championship
10	Las Vegas Village	Las Vegas, Nevada	November 5	Standalone
Ex.	Homebush Street Circuit	Sydney, Australia	December 4–6	Sydney 500

== Season summary ==
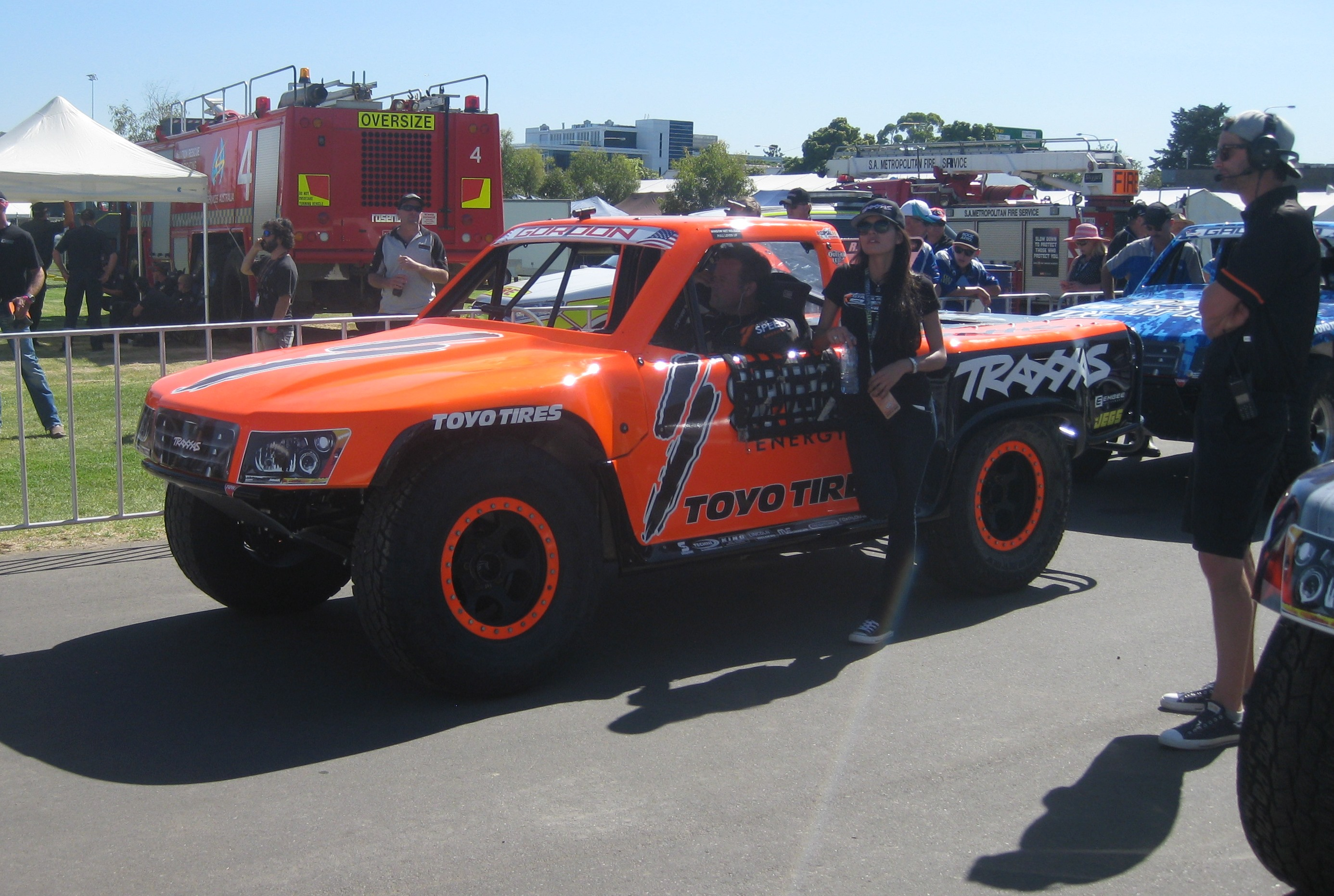
Robby Gordon's truck at the 2015 Clipsal 500

The season-opening tripleheader was held in conjunction with the V8 Supercars Championship's Clipsal 500, one of seven support events for the race. It was the trucks' first time racing in Australia. Of the ten drivers, six were series veterans: Robby Gordon, E. J. Viso, Keegan Kincaid, Charles Dorrance, Bill Hynes, and Sheldon Creed; also comprising the field were Australian racers: off-road motorcycle racer Toby Price, off-road racer Brad Gallard, former V8 Supercars driver Nathan Pretty, and stunt rider Matt Mingay. Before the start of the first race, Dorrance flipped in turn 9, and the effort to flip the truck back shortened the race from eight to five laps. Viso, starting from sixth, moved up the field and took the lead and eventual win after Pretty's suspension failed. Gordon finished second, followed by Mingay. Creed won the second round. In race three, backfield starters Creed, Gordon and Viso moved to the front quickly, and battled with Mingay for the lead, but Mingay and Viso made contact and spun in turn 6. Creed and Gordon duelled for second while Kincaid led for the remainder of the race. On the final lap, Gordon passed Creed in the final turn as Creed lost control of his truck; after jumping the second ramp, Creed flipped, hit the wall upon crossing the finish, and landed back on all four tires.

Formula Off-Road returned to the United States for the Grand Prix of St. Petersburg alongside the IndyCar Series. Due to rain, truck qualifying speeds were slower than in previous years, though Creed was still the fastest qualifier. Creed battled with IndyCar veteran Viso throughout the first race, but the latter fell out of podium position when he went wide in turn ten on the final lap. In the second race, Scotty Steele led until he began suffering from mechanical failure, allowing Burt Jenner to take his first career victory. Viso would rebound from his St. Petersburg error by winning at the Grand Prix of Long Beach, beating Creed by over five seconds.

At the Detroit Belle Isle Grand Prix, Gordon, Viso, and Jenner took round wins. Gordon won the first race after passing Viso on the final lap; Viso won the second when he held off Steele in a rainstorm; and Jenner won the third.

In early June, the series returned to the X Games at Circuit of the Americas for 2015. For the event, various drivers made their series debuts, three of whom were NASCAR drivers: 1989 NASCAR Winston Cup Series champion Rusty Wallace, road course ringer Boris Said, and former Nationwide Series driver and eleven-time X Games medalist Travis Pastrana. Additionally, Moto X biker Jeremy Stenberg competed in the event. Of the 16 drivers invited, five are teenagers, with four being younger than 17: C. J. Greaves (19), Creed (17), Jerett Brooks and Steele (16), and Gavin Harlien (15). Creed, Viso, Jenner, and Gordon won the four heat races to advance to the final, while Greaves was first in the Last Chance Qualifier. Harlien, Wallace, X Games Austin 2014 gold medalist Apdaly Lopez, Said, and Stenberg failed to qualify; Wallace also rolled his truck during the event. In the final, Creed utilized the holeshot to pull ahead and win gold.

At Honda Indy Toronto, Indy Lights and FIA Formula E Championship driver Matthew Brabham made his series debut shortly before the Friday practice; Paul Tracy was originally scheduled to drive the truck but television obligations forced him out. The weather for Saturday was dry, though Sunday was marred by wet conditions. Steele won his first Formula Off-Road race after passing Kincaid on the opening lap and leading the rest of the Saturday event, while Kincaid won the Sunday round in a 1–2 finish for Traxxas drivers when Creed finished behind him.

Between points rounds, the trucks participated in the Goodwood Festival of Speed.

In September, SST joined the Sand Sports Super Show, running on a mixed-surface course at the OC Fair & Event Center. Aaron Kaufman of Gas Monkey Garage made his series debut at the weekend; in one race, his truck landed and rode along a K-rail; afterward, Gordon joked it was "some of the best, worst driving I have ever seen from the Toyo Tires driver." P. J. Jones won the first night of racing, while Creed was victorious in the next two.

Formula Off-Road returned to Australia with Gold Coast 600 weekend at Surfers Paradise Street Circuit. 2014 Bathurst 1000 winner Paul Morris made his series debut in the weekend and was the fastest during qualifying. In the first race, Brett Thomas led early before suffering a penalty, with Mingay also receiving one after hitting a water barrier. Jenner held off Brabham to win the round. Creed, who suffered a broken axle in the race, bounced back in the second race when he barely beat Gordon to the finish for the victory. A doubleheader took place on October 25, with Creed winning the first and Mingay the second for his maiden SST victory. Morris scored the overall weekend win after finishing fifth and second that day.

The series remained in Australia for Round 20; despite initial plans to race at the Sydney Showground Stadium, the Trucks moved the race to the Valvoline Raceway in Granville as a support race for the Ultimate Sprintcar Championship due to clashing schedules. Creed went on to win.

Las Vegas Village hosted the 2015 season finale. NASCAR Whelen Euro Series driver Anthony Gandon made his series debut, while Greg Adler ran his first start since X Games Austin 2014. Gordon won the first race, while Creed won the second en route to his first SST championship.

In December, the trucks returned to Australia for an exhibition series at the Sydney 500. Creed won two of the races, while Mingay won the third.

== Results and standings ==
=== Race results ===
Round	Race	Event	Fastest qualifier	Pole position	Most laps led	Winning driver	Ref
1	1	Adelaide	(United States) Sheldon Creed	(Australia) Nathan Pretty	(Venezuela) E. J. Viso	(Venezuela) E. J. Viso	
1	2	Adelaide	(United States) Sheldon Creed	(United States) Charles Dorrance	(United States) Sheldon Creed	(United States) Sheldon Creed	
1	3	Adelaide	(United States) Sheldon Creed	(United States) Charles Dorrance	(United States) Keegan Kincaid	(United States) Keegan Kincaid	
2	4	St. Petersburg	(United States) Sheldon Creed	(United States) Erik Davis	(Venezuela) E. J. Viso	(United States) Sheldon Creed	
2	5	St. Petersburg	(United States) Sheldon Creed	(United States) Scotty Steele	(United States) Burt Jenner	(United States) Burt Jenner	
3	6	Long Beach	(United States) Sheldon Creed	(United States) Bill Hynes	(Venezuela) E. J. Viso	(Venezuela) E. J. Viso	
4	7	Detroit	—N/a	(United States) Scotty Steele	(Venezuela) E. J. Viso (United States) Burt Jenner	(United States) Robby Gordon	
4	8	Detroit	—N/a	(United States) Arie Luyendyk Jr.	(United States) Scotty Steele	(Venezuela) E. J. Viso	
4	9	Detroit	—N/a	(United States) Bill Hynes	(United States) Burt Jenner	(United States) Burt Jenner	
5	H1	X Games	(United States) Sheldon Creed	(United States) Sheldon Creed	—N/a	(United States) Sheldon Creed	
5	H2	X Games	(United States) Sheldon Creed	(Venezuela) E. J. Viso	—N/a	(Venezuela) E. J. Viso	
5	H3	X Games	(United States) Sheldon Creed	(United States) Burt Jenner	—N/a	(United States) Burt Jenner	
5	H4	X Games	(United States) Sheldon Creed	(United States) Kyle LeDuc	—N/a	(United States) Robby Gordon	
5	LCQ	X Games	(United States) Sheldon Creed	(United States) C. J. Greaves	—N/a	(United States) C. J. Greaves	
5	10	X Games	(United States) Sheldon Creed	(United States) Sheldon Creed	(United States) Sheldon Creed	(United States) Sheldon Creed	
6	11	Toronto	(Venezuela) E. J. Viso	(United States) Bill Hynes	(United States) Scotty Steele	(United States) Scotty Steele	
6	12	Toronto	(Venezuela) E. J. Viso	(Venezuela) E. J. Viso	(United States) Keegan Kincaid	(United States) Keegan Kincaid	
7	H1	Costa Mesa	(United States) Robby Gordon	(United States) Bill Hynes	—N/a	(United States) Burt Jenner	
7	H2	Costa Mesa	(United States) Robby Gordon	(United States) Aaron Kaufman	—N/a	(United States) Sheldon Creed	
7	13	Costa Mesa	(United States) Robby Gordon	(United States) Charles Dorrance	(United States) P. J. Jones	(United States) P. J. Jones	
7	H1	Costa Mesa	(United States) Sheldon Creed	(United States) P. J. Jones	—N/a	(United States) Burt Jenner	
7	H2	Costa Mesa	(United States) Sheldon Creed	(United States) Augie Lerch	—N/a	(United States) Scotty Steele	
7	14	Costa Mesa	(United States) Sheldon Creed	(United States) Sheldon Creed	(United States) Sheldon Creed	(United States) Sheldon Creed	
7	H	Costa Mesa	—N/a	(United States) Scotty Steele	—N/a	(United States) Sheldon Creed	
7	15	Costa Mesa	—N/a	(United States) Augie Lerch	(United States) Sheldon Creed	(United States) Sheldon Creed	
8	16	Surfers Paradise	(Australia) Paul Morris	(United States) Bill Hynes	(United States) Burt Jenner	(United States) Burt Jenner	
8	17	Surfers Paradise	(Australia) Paul Morris	(United States) Scotty Steele	(United States) Sheldon Creed	(United States) Sheldon Creed	
8	18	Surfers Paradise	(Australia) Paul Morris	(United States) Bill Hynes	(United States) Scotty Steele	(United States) Sheldon Creed	
8	19	Surfers Paradise	(Australia) Paul Morris	(United States) Bill Hynes	(Australia) Paul Morris	(Australia) Matt Mingay	
9	20	Granville	(United States) Sheldon Creed	(United States) Bill Hynes	(United States) Sheldon Creed	(United States) Sheldon Creed	
10	21	Las Vegas	(United States) Robby Gordon	(United States) Bill Hynes	(United States) Robby Gordon	(United States) Robby Gordon	
10	22	Las Vegas	(United States) Robby Gordon	(United States) Sheldon Creed	(United States) Sheldon Creed	(United States) Sheldon Creed	
Ex.	1	Sydney	—N/a	—N/a	—N/a	(United States) Sheldon Creed	
Ex.	2	Sydney	—N/a	—N/a	—N/a	(United States) Sheldon Creed	
Ex.	3	Sydney	—N/a	—N/a	—N/a	(Australia) Matt Mingay	

=== Drivers' championship ===
Rank	Driver	(Australia) ADE			(Florida) STP		(California) LBH	(Michigan) DET			(Texas) X Games						(Canada) TOR		(California) OCF								(Australia) SRF				(Australia) SYD	(Nevada) LVV		Points
Rank	Driver	(Australia) ADE			(Florida) STP		(California) LBH	(Michigan) DET			H1	H2	H3	H4	LCQ	F	(Canada) TOR		H1	H2	F1	H1	H2	F2	H	F3	(Australia) SRF				(Australia) SYD	(Nevada) LVV		Points
1	(United States) Sheldon Creed	5	1*	3	1	4	2	Rpl^{†}	Rpl^{†}	Rpl^{†}	**1**					**1***	2	2		1	8	3		**1***	1	1*	9	1*	1	5	1*	10	**1***	617
2	(United States) Robby Gordon	2	2	2	3	3	3	1	6	7				1		2	3	3	5		2		2	3	3	2	4	2	3	8	8	1*	2	584
3	(United States) Keegan Kincaid	4	9	1*	2	2	5	4	5	3		2				8	4	1*						Rpl^{‡}	Rpl^{‡}	Rpl^{‡}	6	4	DNS	3	10	6	9	482
4	(United States) Burt Jenner				5	1*		3*	3	1*			**1**			6			1		9	1		2	4	3	1*	6	9	4	11	2	10	399
5	(United States) Scotty Steele				10	**9**	4	**6**	2*	2		3			7	DNQ	1*	8		2	6		1	9	9	DNQ	11	**3**	2*	6	7	3	3	385
6	(Venezuela) E. J. Viso	**1***	4	10	4*	5	1*	2*	1	5		**1**				7	8	**9**		Rpl^{‡}	Rpl^{‡}	Rpl^{‡}		Rpl^{‡}	Rpl^{‡}	Rpl^{‡}								344
7	(United States) Bill Hynes	8	8	9	6	10	**9**	8	10	**10**	3				3	DNQ	**7**	6	**4**		5		4	5	8	4	**10**	11	**8**	**7**	**3**	**8**	7	310
8	(United States) Charles Dorrance	10	**7**	**7**	7	7	8	Rpl^{‡}	9	9				4	DNS	DNQ	5	5	3		**7**	4		7	7	8						7	6	243
9	(Australia) Matt Mingay	3	3	4																							5	7	4	1	9	9	5	192
10	(Australia) Matthew Brabham																6	4									2	8	10	10	2			115
11	(Australia) Paul Morris																										3	5	5	2*	5			113
12	(Australia) Greg Gartner																										7	9	6	11	4			76
13	(United States) Arie Luyendyk Jr.							10	**8**	8			2			3																		72
14	(United States) Augie Lerch																			4	3		**3**	6	5	**6**								71
15	(Australia) Brett Thomas																										8	10	7	9				65
16	(United States) Aaron Bambach							5	7	6																								45
17	(Australia) Nathan Pretty	9	5	6																														43
18	(Australia) Brad Gallard	7	10	5																														41
19	(France) Anthony Gandon																															4	4	39
20	(United States) Erik Davis				**9**	8	11																											35
21	(United States) C. J. Greaves												3		**1**	4																		34
22	(United States) Aaron Kaufman																			5	10		5	8										34
23	(United States) Kyle LeDuc						10							**2**		9																		33
24	(United States) Greg Adler																															5	8	32
25	(Mexico) Lalo Laguna				8	6																												28
26	(Australia) Toby Price	6		8																														28
27	(United States) Jerett Brooks										2					5																		27
28	(Canada) Russell Boyle																9	7																26
29	(United States) Gavin Harlien												5		DNS	DNQ																		20
30	(United States) Travis Pastrana											5			2	10																		18
31	(Australia) Billy Geddes		6																															15
32	(United States) Dale Dondel						7																											14
33	(United States) Rusty Wallace													3	6	DNQ																		8
34	(United States) Boris Said													4	4	DNQ																		7
35	(United States) Jeremy Stenberg											4			5	DNQ																		7
36	(Mexico) Apdaly Lopez										4				8	DNQ																		7
37	(United States) P. J. Jones							7^{†}	4^{†}	4^{†}									2		1*	**2**		4^{‡}	2^{‡}	5^{‡}								0
38	(New Zealand) Mike Whiddett																			3^{‡}	4^{‡}	5^{‡}		10^{‡}	6^{‡}	7^{‡}								0
	(United States) Larry Job							9^{‡}																										
	(Australia) Danny Reidy																														6			

Legend
Color	Result
Gold	Winner
Silver	2nd place
Bronze	3rd place
Green	4th–5th place (Top 5)
Light Blue	6th–10th place (Top 10)
Dark Blue	Finished (Outside Top 10)
Purple	Did not finish (DNF)
Red	Did not qualify (DNQ)
Brown	Withdrew (Wth)
Black	Disqualified (DSQ)
White	Did not start (DNS)
White	Race cancelled or abandoned (C)
Blank	Did not participate (DNP)
Blank	Driver replacement (Rpl)
Blank	Race not held (NH)
Blank	Not competing

**In-line notation**
**Bold**	Pole position (1 point; except Indy)
Italics	Ran fastest race lap
^{L}	Led race lap (1 point)
*	Led most race laps (2 points)
^{1–12}	Indy 500 "Fast Twelve" bonus points
^{c}	Qualifying canceled (no bonus point)
RY	Rookie of the Year
R	Rookie

Points	Position														
Points	1st	2nd	3rd	4th	5th	6th	7th	8th	9th	10th	11th	12th	13th	14th	15th
Heat	12	10	8	7	5	4	3	2	1						
Final	25	22	20	18	16	15	14	13	12	11	10	9	8	7	6

Bonuses
Most laps led	3
Position gained	1
Fastest qualifier	1

==== Driver replacements ====
Key	No.	Original driver	Replacement driver	Race
†	3	Charles Dorrance	Larry Job	Detroit
†	74	Sheldon Creed	P. J. Jones	Detroit
‡	5	E. J. Viso	Mike Whiddett	Sand Sports Super Show
‡	47	Keegan Kincaid	P. J. Jones	Sand Sports Super Show
All points scored by the replacement went to the original driver.
