= 2014 Stadium Super Trucks =

Racing season

Seasons
- ← 2013 2015 →

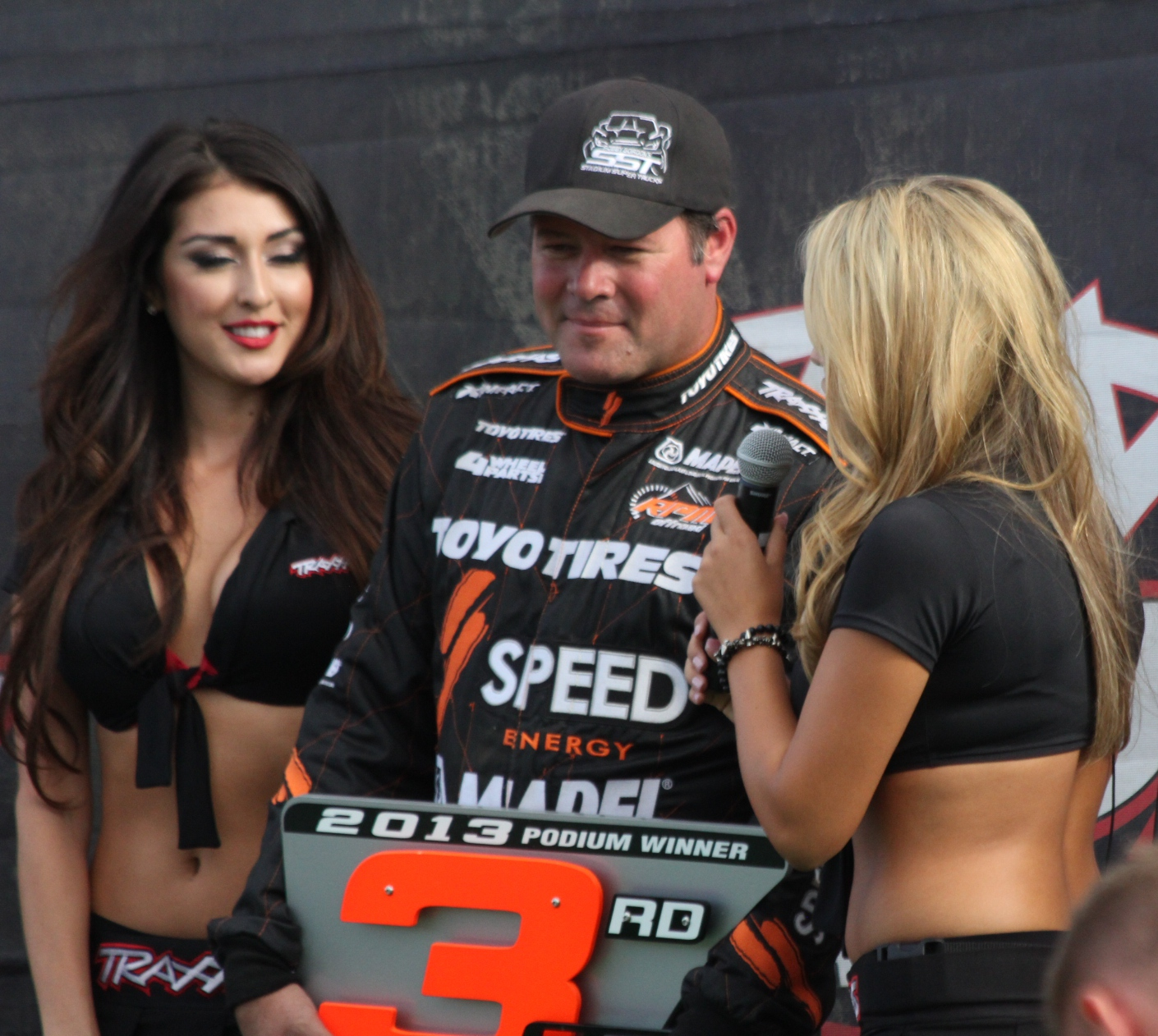
Robby Gordon won the 2014 championship for his second consecutive title

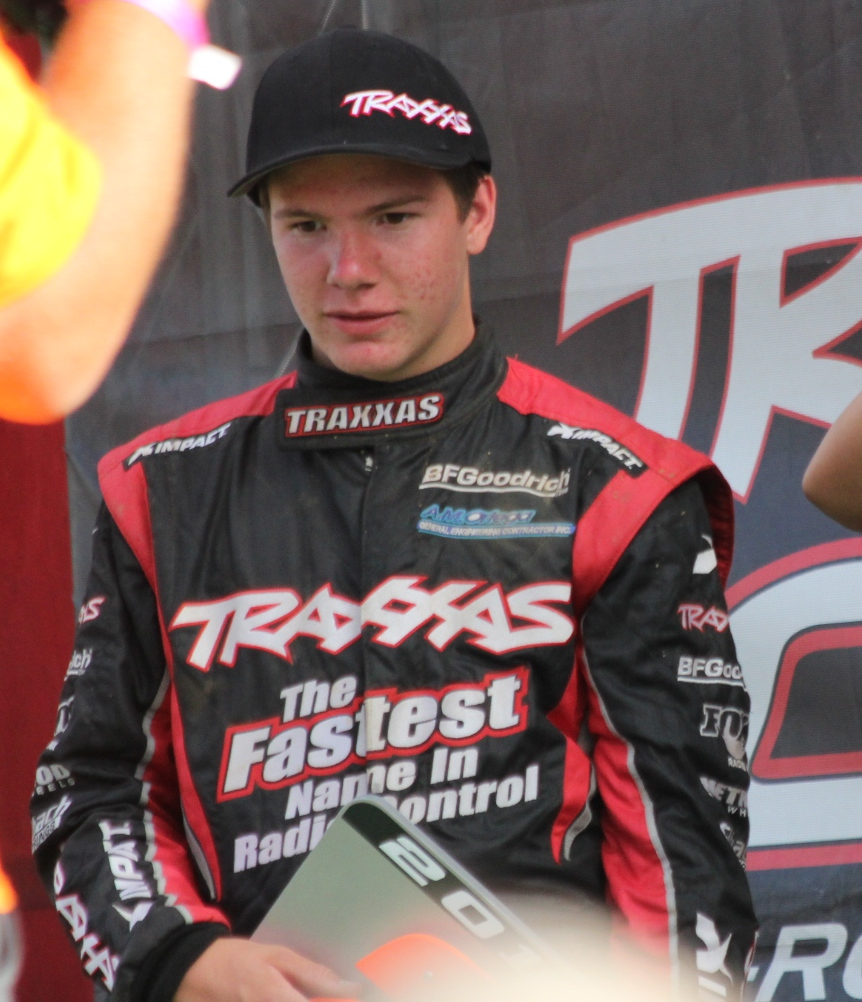
Sheldon Creed finished second in points

The 2014 Stadium Super Trucks were the second season of the Stadium Super Trucks and the first under the Speed Energy Formula Off-Road presented by Traxxas name.

As he did in 2013, series founder Robby Gordon was the winner of the series championship, taking six victories en route to the title. Gordon won the championship by 75 points ahead of Sheldon Creed, who won a trio of races during the year, including a clean sweep at the IndyCar Series-supporting event in Toronto. Third place in the championship went to Apdaly Lopez, who won two races during the season, at the X Games and at the Indianapolis Motor Speedway. E. J. Viso won the most races with the exception of Gordon, which included winning all three races at the Detroit Grand Prix, as part of a part-time season; Viso ultimately finished fifth in the championship. Keegan Kincaid (OC Fair) and P. J. Jones (St. Petersburg) were the only other winners during the 2014 season.

== Drivers ==
No.	Driver	Races
3	(United States) Charles Dorrance	4–5, 9, 12–14
3	(Canada) Paul Tracy	10–11
3	(United States) Travis PeCoy	16
5	(United States) Scotty Steele	All
6	(United States) Justin Lofton	1–2, 9
7	(United States) Robby Gordon	All
8	(United States) Justin Matney	9
9	(United States) Bobby Runyan Jr.	9
10	(United States) Greg Adler	9
12	(United States) Nick Baumgartner	9
13	(United States) Nick Vanis	3, 9–14
14	(United States) Davey Hamilton	1–2
18	(Mexico) Apdaly Lopez	All
19	(Venezuela) E. J. Viso	3, 6–9, 12–16
24	(United States) Bradley Morris	3
25	(United States) Arie Luyendyk Jr.	4–9
26	(United States) Jay Reichert	9
30	(United States) Robbie Pierce	4–5
47	(United States) Keegan Kincaid	4–9, 14–16
50	(United States) Burt Jenner	4–9, 12–16
55	(United States) Gavin Harlien	1–3, 9, 15–16
55	(United States) Bruce Canepa	14
57	(United States) Bill Hynes	10–12, 16
57	(United States) Justin Lofton	15
74	(United States) Sheldon Creed	1–11, 14–16
74	(United States) Keegan Kincaid	12–13
77	(United States) Jerrett Brooks	1–5, 9
87	(United States) Aaron Bambach	6–8, 10–13
87	(United States) Dave Royce	14
91	(United States) Henrique Cisneros	6–9
97	(United States) BJ Baldwin	9, 12–13
98	(United States) P. J. Jones	1–3, 13, 15–16
Sources: (Note: Sorted by round: St. Petersburg (Races 1–2); Long Beach (Races 3); Indianapolis (Races 4–5); Detroit (Races 6–8); X Games (Race 9); Toronto (Races 10–11); Costa Mesa (Races 12–13); Coronado (Race 14); Las Vegas 1 (Race 15); Las Vegas 2 (Race 16))

== Schedule ==
Round	Track	Location	Date	Supporting
1	St. Petersburg Street Course	St. Petersburg, Florida	March 29–30	Firestone Grand Prix of St. Petersburg
2	Long Beach Street Circuit	Long Beach, California	April 13	Toyota Grand Prix of Long Beach
3	Indianapolis Motor Speedway	Speedway, Indiana	May 23	Indianapolis 500
4	Raceway at Belle Isle Park	Detroit, Michigan	May 30–June 1	Chevrolet Detroit Belle Isle Grand Prix
5	Circuit of the Americas	Austin, Texas	June 8	X Games Austin
6	Exhibition Place	(Canada) Toronto, Ontario	July 19–20	Honda Indy Toronto
7	OC Fair & Event Center	Costa Mesa, California	September 19–20	Sand Sports Super Show
8	Naval Air Station North Island	Coronado, California	September 21	Coronado Speed Festival
9	MGM Resorts Village	Las Vegas, Nevada	November 1	SEMA
10	MGM Resorts Village	Las Vegas, Nevada	November 6	SEMA

== Season summary ==
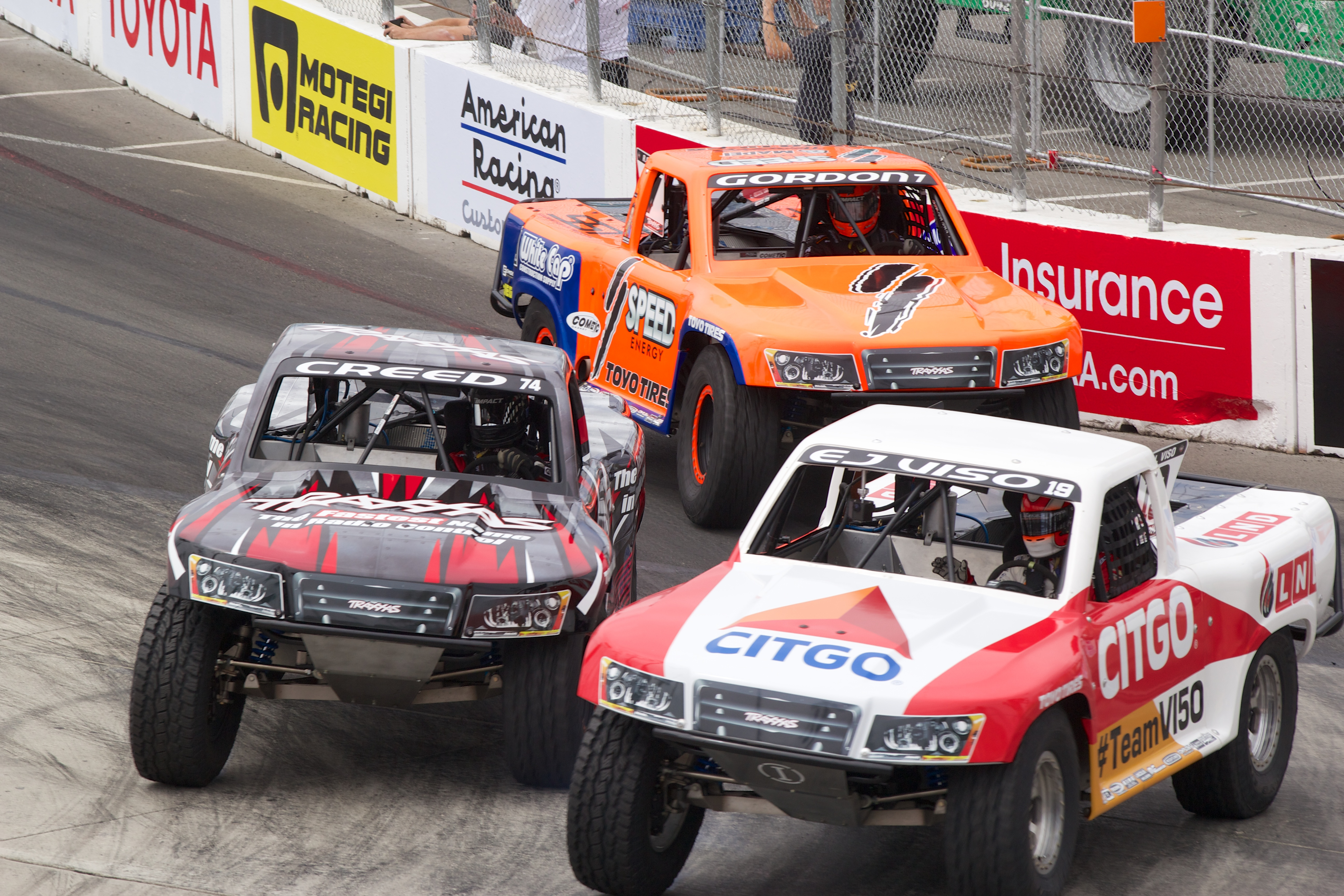
E. J. Viso, Sheldon Creed, and Robby Gordon racing at the Grand Prix of Long Beach

The 2014 Speed Energy Formula Off-Road season began in March with the Stadium Super Trucks' inaugural trip to the Firestone Grand Prix of St. Petersburg. The first race was marred by a rain storm as Robby Gordon took the win, while P. J. Jones beat out Gordon in the second. Gordon won again at the following month's Toyota Grand Prix of Long Beach when he passed the battling Sheldon Creed and E. J. Viso for the victory. Viso, an IndyCar Series driver making his series debut, finished second after leading the most laps.

In May, the trucks raced at Indianapolis Motor Speedway as part of the Indianapolis 500's Carb Day. Known as the Menards at the Brickyard, the track layout featured part of the oval's frontstretch and the infield road course. Prior to the racing, Charles Dorrance's truck rolled through the grass after a poor ramp entry, leading to rib injuries. Gordon and Apdaly Lopez won the two races; Lopez, who finished second in the first round, claimed the overall weekend victory. The following week, SST joined the Chevrolet Detroit Belle Isle Grand Prix slate for the first time. Viso went on to sweep the weekend's three races as he off Arie Luyendyk Jr. in the first round, led the final three laps of the second, and survived a collision with Burt Jenner to hold the lead in the third.

Formula Off-Road's next stop was X Games Austin 2014 at Circuit of the Americas, a date that was scheduled in December 2013. A series-record 20 drivers entered the event. The field was split into two heats of ten drivers apiece, with the top eight advancing to the final; Justin Lofton and Gordon won the heats, while Dorrance, Nick Vanis, Greg Adler, and Jay Reichert failed to qualify. In the final, Bobby Runyan Jr. hit a jump with two wheels on lap four, sending his truck into a roll and triggering a red flag. At the restart, Lopez took the lead and maintained it to win the gold medal, with Creed and Gordon taking silver and bronze, respectively; Lopez became the first male Mexican X Games gold medalist. The X Games helped the trucks catch the attention of sports marketing firm The Elevation Group, whose president Denny Young decided to purchase a 40 percent stake in the series in September.

At Honda Indy Toronto, Creed swept the weekend. The first race saw a wet course due to rain, during which Creed moved through the field from the back as Scotty Steele led. The two eventually battled until Creed passed him. The second race, this time in dry conditions, featured a duel between Creed and Gordon that the former won.

From September 19–21, the series ran a weekend tripleheader in Southern California with dates at the OC Fair & Event Center and Naval Air Station North Island. The OC Fair races were part of the Sand Sports Super Show; SST was joined by support classes including off-road class 1440 trucks, motocross, trophy karts, and UTVs. Two heats for each final were held, with Viso and Gordon winning the first round's and Gordon and Lopez splitting the following day's. In the first final, pole sitter BJ Baldwin led the first half before he collided with Viso and fell off the pace, enabling Gordon to take the lead and win. Keegan Kincaid won the second final after catching up to Gordon when the latter began experiencing issues with his truck; Kincaid raced with Creed's No. 74 number plate, meaning the points scored by Kincaid went to Creed in the standings. On Sunday, the trucks joined the Coronado Speed Festival at NAS North Island, an event held to celebrate Fleet Week and also featured vintage racing; a vintage race was held between the Formula Off-Road heat race and final. Viso won the heat, while Gordon took advantage of the Joker Lap on a green flag restart to pull ahead and score the victory in the final.

The 2014 season finale took place at the MGM Resorts Village in Las Vegas, held in conjunction with SEMA. Viso led the first race of the weekend with Kincaid and Gordon in tow, but Viso retired after hitting a K rail. Gordon passed Kincaid after Viso's incident to take the lead and the eventual round victory; Burt Jenner finished third for his first career podium. In the final round, Creed and Gordon fought for the lead until the former cleared the latter late in the race. Although Creed won the race, he finished 75 points behind Gordon in the championship; Gordon ended the 2014 season with his second series title as he recorded six wins and 14 podiums.

== Results and standings ==
=== Race results ===
Round	Race	Event	Fastest qualifier	Pole position	Most laps led	Winning driver	Ref
1	1	St. Petersburg	(United States) Sheldon Creed	(United States) Scotty Steele	(United States) Justin Lofton	(United States) Robby Gordon	
1	2	St. Petersburg	(United States) P. J. Jones	(United States) Davey Hamilton	(United States) P. J. Jones	(United States) P. J. Jones	
2	3	Long Beach	(United States) Sheldon Creed	(Mexico) Apdaly Lopez	(Venezuela) E. J. Viso	(United States) Robby Gordon	
3	4	Indianapolis	(United States) Robby Gordon	(United States) Burt Jenner	(United States) Keegan Kincaid	(United States) Robby Gordon	
3	5	Indianapolis	(United States) Robby Gordon	(United States) Scotty Steele	(Mexico) Apdaly Lopez	(Mexico) Apdaly Lopez	
4	6	Detroit	(Venezuela) E. J. Viso	(United States) Henrique Cisneros	(Venezuela) E. J. Viso	(Venezuela) E. J. Viso	
4	7	Detroit	(Venezuela) E. J. Viso	(United States) Scotty Steele	(Venezuela) E. J. Viso	(Venezuela) E. J. Viso	
4	8	Detroit	(Venezuela) E. J. Viso	(Mexico) Apdaly Lopez	(Mexico) Apdaly Lopez	(Venezuela) E. J. Viso	
5	H1	X Games	(United States) Robby Gordon	(United States) Sheldon Creed	—N/a	(United States) Justin Lofton	
5	H2	X Games	(United States) Robby Gordon	(United States) Bobby Runyan Jr.	—N/a	(Mexico) Apdaly Lopez	
5	9	X Games	(United States) Robby Gordon	(United States) Justin Lofton	(Mexico) Apdaly Lopez	(Mexico) Apdaly Lopez	
6	10	Toronto	(United States) Robby Gordon	(United States) Aaron Bambach	(United States) Sheldon Creed	(United States) Sheldon Creed	
6	11	Toronto	(United States) Robby Gordon	(United States) Bill Hynes	(United States) Sheldon Creed	(United States) Sheldon Creed	
7	H1	Costa Mesa	(United States) Robby Gordon	(United States) Nick Vanis	—N/a	(Venezuela) E. J. Viso	
7	H2	Costa Mesa	(United States) Robby Gordon	(United States) Bill Hynes	—N/a	(United States) Robby Gordon	
7	12	Costa Mesa	(United States) Robby Gordon	(United States) BJ Baldwin	(United States) Robby Gordon	(United States) Robby Gordon	
7	H1	Costa Mesa	(Venezuela) E. J. Viso	(United States) Nick Vanis	—N/a	(United States) Robby Gordon	
7	H2	Costa Mesa	(Venezuela) E. J. Viso	(United States) Scotty Steele	—N/a	(United States) Apdaly Lopez	
7	13	Costa Mesa	(Venezuela) E. J. Viso	(United States) Keegan Kincaid	(United States) Robby Gordon	(United States) Keegan Kincaid	
8	H	Coronado	(Venezuela) E. J. Viso	(United States) Nick Vanis	—N/a	(Venezuela) E. J. Viso	
8	14	Coronado	(Venezuela) E. J. Viso	(United States) Charles Dorrance	(Venezuela) E. J. Viso	(United States) Robby Gordon	
9	H1	Las Vegas	(United States) Robby Gordon	(United States) Robby Gordon	—N/a	(United States) Robby Gordon	
9	H2	Las Vegas	(United States) Robby Gordon	(United States) Keegan Kincaid	—N/a	(United States) Keegan Kincaid	
9	15	Las Vegas	(United States) Robby Gordon	(Venezuela) E. J. Viso	(Venezuela) E. J. Viso	(United States) Robby Gordon	
10	H1	Las Vegas	(Venezuela) E. J. Viso	(Venezuela) E. J. Viso	—N/a	(United States) Sheldon Creed	
10	H2	Las Vegas	(Venezuela) E. J. Viso	(United States) Robby Gordon	—N/a	(United States) Robby Gordon	
10	16	Las Vegas	(Venezuela) E. J. Viso	(Venezuela) E. J. Viso	(United States) Sheldon Creed	(United States) Sheldon Creed	

=== Drivers' championship ===
Rank	Driver	(United States) STP		(United States) LBH	(United States) IMS		(United States) DET			(United States) X Games			(Canada) TOR		(United States) OCF						(United States) CSS		(United States) LVV						Points
Rank	Driver	(United States) STP		(United States) LBH	(United States) IMS		(United States) DET			H1	H2	F	(Canada) TOR		H1	H2	F	H1	H2	F	H1	F	H1	H2	F	H1	H2	F	Points
1	(United States) Robby Gordon	1	2	1	1	5	2	5	3	5		3	2	2		1	1*	1		2*	6	1*	**1**		1		1	2	492
2	(United States) Sheldon Creed	9	5	3	8	3	Rpl^{†}	Rpl^{†}	Rpl^{†}	**2**		2	1*	1*		Rpl^{†}	Rpl^{†}	Rpl^{†}		Rpl^{†}	2	2		2	4	1		1*	417
3	(Mexico) Apdaly Lopez	5	8	**6**	3	1*	9	8	**6***		1	1*	5	5		3	9		1	8	4	6	3		9		3	3	331
4	(United States) Scotty Steele	**6**	6	8	6	**7**	6	**2**	7		2	5	3	3	3		5		**3**	3	3	7		4	6		4	8	307
5	(Venezuela) E. J. Viso			2*			1*	1*	1	6		15			1		3		2	10	1	5	2		**10***	**2**		**10**	280
6	(United States) Burt Jenner				**7**	9	5	7	4	4		13				4	4		4	11	5	4	4		3		2	11	207
7	(United States) Keegan Kincaid				4*	2	7^{†}	6^{†}	8^{†}	3		6				2^{†}	2^{†}	2^{†}		**1**^{†}	7	3		**1**	2	5		4	152
8	(United States) Aaron Bambach						4	3	5				**4**	6	4		6	3		5	Rpl^{‡}	Rpl^{‡}							150
9	(United States) Jerett Brooks	2	3	10	2	4					3	4																	129
10	(United States) Gavin Harlien	4	7	5							5	9												3	5	4		5	112
11	(United States) Arie Luyendyk Jr.				5	6	3	4	2		8	10																	110
12	(United States) Bill Hynes												7	**8**		**6**	DNS							Rpl^{#}	Rpl^{#}		6	7	100
13	(United States) Nick Vanis			9						10		DNQ	DNS	7	**5**		10	**4**		6	**9**	10							91
14	(United States) P. J. Jones	7	1*	4															5	4						3		6	88
15	(United States) Charles Dorrance				10	10				9		DNQ				5	7		6	9	10	**9**							71
16	(United States) Justin Lofton	3*	4							1		**12**												5^{#}	8^{#}				68
17	(United States) Henrique Cisneros						**8**	DNS	DNS		6	7																	55
18	(United States) BJ Baldwin									7		14			2		**8**	5		7									52
19	(United States) Dave Royce																				8^{‡}	8^{‡}	5		7	6		9	51
20	(Canada) Paul Tracy												6	4															33
21	(United States) Robbie Pierce				9	8																							25
22	(United States) Davey Hamilton	8	**9**																										25
23	(United States) Nick Baumgartner										4	8																	20
24	(United States) Travis PeCoy																										5	12	14
25	(United States) Bradley Morris			7																									14
26	(United States) Justin Matney									8		11																	12
27	(United States) Bobby Runyan Jr.										**7**	16																	8
28	(United States) Bruce Canepa																				11	11							2
29	(United States) Greg Adler										9	DNQ																	1
30	(United States) Jay Reichert										10	DNQ																	1

Legend
Color	Result
Gold	Winner
Silver	2nd place
Bronze	3rd place
Green	4th–5th place (Top 5)
Light Blue	6th–10th place (Top 10)
Dark Blue	Finished (Outside Top 10)
Purple	Did not finish (DNF)
Red	Did not qualify (DNQ)
Brown	Withdrew (Wth)
Black	Disqualified (DSQ)
White	Did not start (DNS)
White	Race cancelled or abandoned (C)
Blank	Did not participate (DNP)
Blank	Driver replacement (Rpl)
Blank	Race not held (NH)
Blank	Not competing

**In-line notation**
**Bold**	Pole position (1 point; except Indy)
Italics	Ran fastest race lap
^{L}	Led race lap (1 point)
*	Led most race laps (2 points)
^{1–12}	Indy 500 "Fast Twelve" bonus points
^{c}	Qualifying canceled (no bonus point)
RY	Rookie of the Year
R	Rookie

Points	Position														
Points	1st	2nd	3rd	4th	5th	6th	7th	8th	9th	10th	11th	12th	13th	14th	15th
Heat	12	10	8	7	5	4	3	2	1						
Final	25	22	20	18	16	15	14	13	12	11	10	9	8	7	6

Bonuses
Most laps led	3
Position gained	1
Fastest qualifier	1

==== Driver replacements ====
Key	No.	Original driver	Replacement driver	Race
†	74	Sheldon Creed	Keegan Kincaid	Detroit, Sand Sports Super Show
‡	87	Aaron Bambach	Dave Royce	Coronado
#	57	Bill Hynes	Justin Lofton	Las Vegas 1
All points scored by the replacement went to the original driver.
