= Aaron Kaufman =

American TV personality

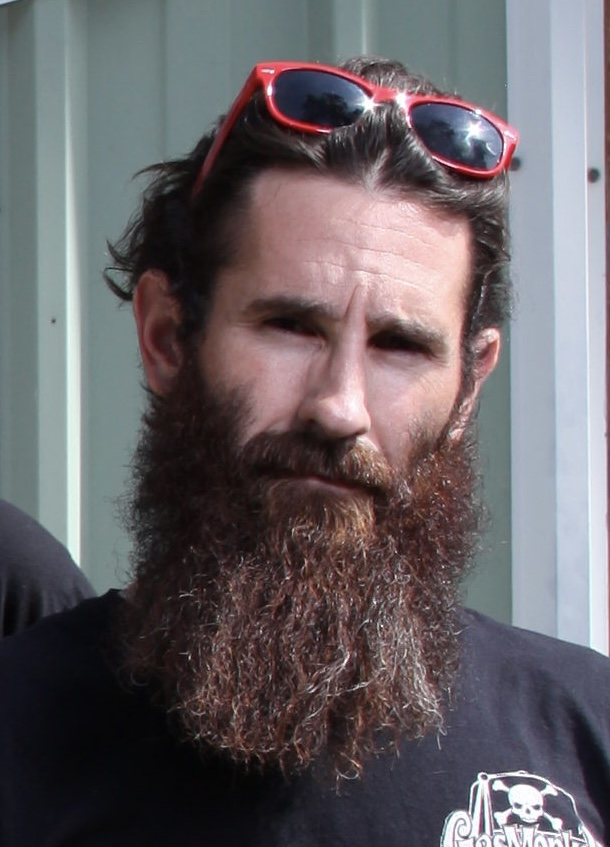
- Kaufman in 2012
- Born: January 26, 1982 (age 44); Crowley, Texas
- Occupations: Television personality Automotive mechanic

Stadium Super Trucks
- Years active: 2015
- Starts: 2
- Wins: 0
- Poles: 0
- Best finish: 22nd in 2015

Aaron Kaufman (born January 26, 1982) is an American television personality, racing driver, and owner of Arclight Fabrication, a Dallas enterprise that supplies aftermarket components for the Ford F-100 pickup.

Kaufman is the former lead mechanic for Gas Monkey Garage. He formerly starred in a one-season television show entitled Shifting Gears with Aaron Kaufman which premiered on March 5, 2018, featuring his new business with Arclight.

In September 2015, Kaufman competed in the Speed Energy Formula Off-Road (Stadium Super Trucks) series, driving a Toyo Tires-sponsored truck at the Sand Sports Super Show in Costa Mesa, California. He ran two rounds during the weekend, finishing fifth in both his heat races, followed by tenth- and eighth-place runs in the features. Kaufman struggled during the races, including one incident in which his truck partially rode on a K-rail; after the race, fellow driver Robby Gordon joked it was "some of the best, worst driving I have ever seen from the Toyo Tires driver."

== Motorsports career results ==
=== Stadium Super Trucks ===
(key) (Bold – Pole position. Italics – Fastest qualifier. * – Most laps led.)

Stadium Super Trucks results
Year	1	2	3	4	5	6	7	8	9	10	11	12	13	14	15	16	17	18	19	20	21	22	SSTC	Pts	Ref
2015	ADE	ADE	ADE	STP	STP	LBH	DET	DET	DET	AUS	TOR	TOR	OCF; 10	OCF; 8	OCF	SRF	SRF	SRF	SRF	SYD	LVV	LVV	22nd	34	
