= Apdaly Lopez =

Mexican racing driver

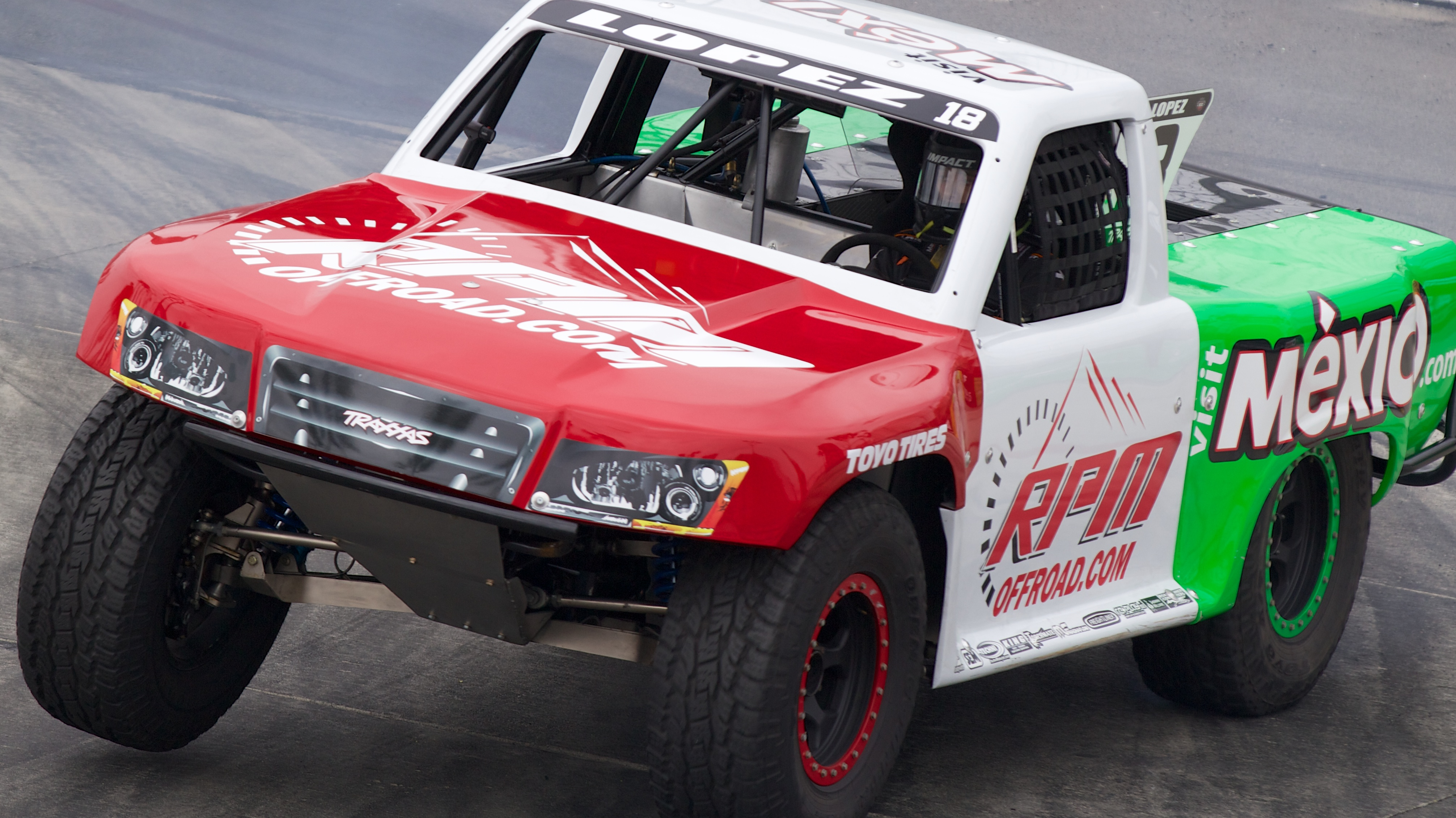
- Lopez competing in the Stadium Super Trucks race at the 2014 Grand Prix of Long Beach
- Nationality: (Mexico) Mexican
- Born: Carlos Lopez; December 2, 1994 (age 31) Tecate, Baja California

SCORE International career
- Current team: RPM Off Road
- Car number: 1
- Engine: Dougans Engine
- Crew chief: Rick Geiser, Matthew Alley
- Co-driver: Luis Omar Montiel
- Former teams: PIN Manufacturing, BORM RACING
- Starts: 25 In Trophy truck
- Wins: 2 In Trophy truck
- Poles: 1
- Finished last season: 2017 Score Tijuana desert challenge 2nd

Previous series
- 2013–2018 2013: Stadium Super Trucks; Stadium Super Trucks Super Buggy

Championship titles
- 2015 2015 2014: SCORE Trophy Truck 2015, 2016 championship Open Truck Code Off-Road Championship; SCORE TT Spec Championship

Awards
- 2015 2015 2015 2014: Univision Extreme Athlete of the Year; Silver FIA American Award; SCORE Driver of the Year; Toyota Milestone Award

Best in the Desert career
- Car number: 5
Medal record
Representing Mexico
Summer X Games
Gold medal – first place	2014 Austin	Stadium Super Trucks

Carlos "Apdaly" Lopez (born December 2, 1994) is an off-road racing driver from Tecate, Baja California. Lopez won the gold medal in the Stadium Super Trucks class at the X Games Austin 2014. His father, Juan Carlos Lopez, is also a professional off-road racer.

== Career history ==
Lopez made his debut in the SCORE International championship at the 2011 Baja 250. He won the ATVPRO 25 class with co-drivers Ivan Mejorado and Gilberto Perez in a Honda TRX450.

Lopez competed in the newly-formed Stadium Super Trucks Super Buggy championship in 2013. Lopez won two races at Qualcomm Stadium. He also competed in the main series at St. Louis and Costa Mesa. At St. Louis, he finished fourth. In Costa Mesa, Lopez finished third in two out three races.

In 2014, Lopez participated in the San Felipe 250. As a co-driver to Clyde Stacy the duo competed in the SCORE Trophy Truck class. The duo finished sixth in class, eighth overall. He also competed full-time in the Stadium Super Trucks. After a solid start of the season, Lopez won the second race at Indianapolis Motor Speedway in support of the 2014 Grand Prix of Indianapolis. He had another good run during the X Games Austin 2014, where the Stadium Super Trucks made their debut. At the modified Circuit of the Americas, Lopez won his heat race and subsequently won the final to claim his first X Games gold medal. Lopez went on to claim nine top three finishes during the season to claim third place in the championship.

After failing to qualify for the X Games Austin 2015 final (he finished last in his heat and 13th in the Last Chance Qualifier), Lopez did not return to SST until 2016 when he participated in the Pike’s Peak Hill Climb Challenge. His next series points race took place in 2017 with the Race & Rock World Championship at Lake Elsinore Diamond; Lopez won the first race but retired from the second after flipping. He also ran the 2018 season opener at the baseball park, a race in which he shared the victory with Bill Hynes due to confusion as multiple drivers had failed to take the Joker Lap.

== Personal ==
Lopez studied engineering at cetys universidad in Tijuana, Baja California.

== Motorsports career results ==
=== Stadium Super Trucks ===
(key) (Bold – Pole position. Italics – Fastest qualifier. * – Most laps led.)

Stadium Super Trucks results
Year	1	2	3	4	5	6	7	8	9	10	11	12	13	14	15	16	17	18	19	20	21	22	SSTC	Pts	Ref
2013	PHO	LBH	LAN	SDG	SDG	STL; 4	TOR	TOR	CRA	CRA	OCF; 3	OCF; 3	**OCF**; 10	CPL									17th	51	
2014	STP; 5	STP; 8	**LBH**; 6	IMS; 3	IMS; 1*	DET; 9	DET; 8	**DET**; 6*	AUS; 1*	TOR; 5	TOR; 5	OCF; 9	OCF; 8	CSS; 6	LVV; 9	LVV; 3							3rd	331	
2015	ADE	ADE	ADE	STP	STP	LBH	DET	DET	DET	AUS; DNQ	TOR	TOR	OCF	OCF	OCF	SRF	SRF	SRF	SRF	SYD	LVV	LVV	36th	7	
2017	ADE	ADE	ADE	STP	STP	LBH	LBH	PER	PER	PER	DET	DET	TEX	TEX	HID	HID	HID	BEI	GLN	GLN	ELS; 1*	ELS; 11	18th	59	
2018	ELS; 1	ADE	ADE	ADE	LBH; 13	LBH; 9	PER	PER	DET	DET	TEX	TEX	ROA	ROA	SMP	SMP	HLN	HLN	MXC; 10	MXC; 10			12th	81	
