= Jerett Brooks =

American racing driver

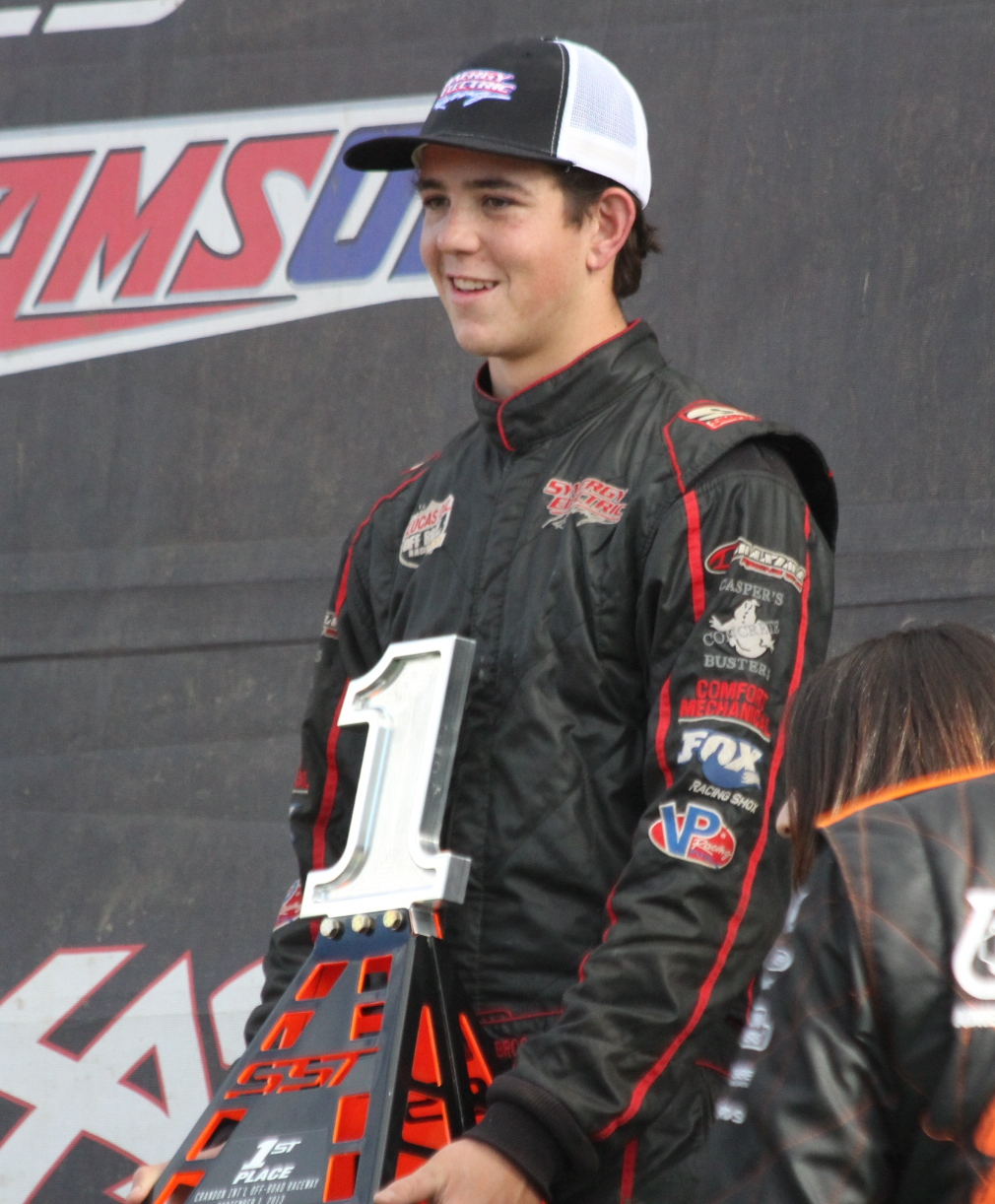
- Brooks after winning the Stadium Super Trucks race at Crandon International Off-Road Raceway in 2013
- Nationality: American
- Born: July 27, 1997 (age 29) Alpine, California, U.S.

Championship Off-Road career
- Current team: Jerett Brooks Racing
- Car number: 77

Stadium Super Trucks career
- Debut season: 2013
- Car number: 27
- Starts: 25
- Wins: 2
- Podiums: 8
- Poles: 1
- Best finish: 9th in 2014
- Finished last season: 13th (2022)

Championship titles
- 2022 2019–2020 2016–2017 2014: COR Pro 2 LOORRS Pro 2 LOORRS Pro Lite; TORC Pro Lite
- Statistics up to date as of November 14, 2022.

Jerett Brooks (born July 27, 1997) is an American racing driver. He mainly competes in short course off-road racing such as TORC: The Off-Road Championship, Lucas Oil Off Road Racing Series, and Championship Off-Road.

Brooks is a five-time off-road truck champion with three Pro Lite class titles in TORC (2014) and LOORRS (2016–2017) and two in LOORRS' Pro 2 division (2019–2020). Brooks has also competed in the Stadium Super Trucks and X Games.

== Racing career ==
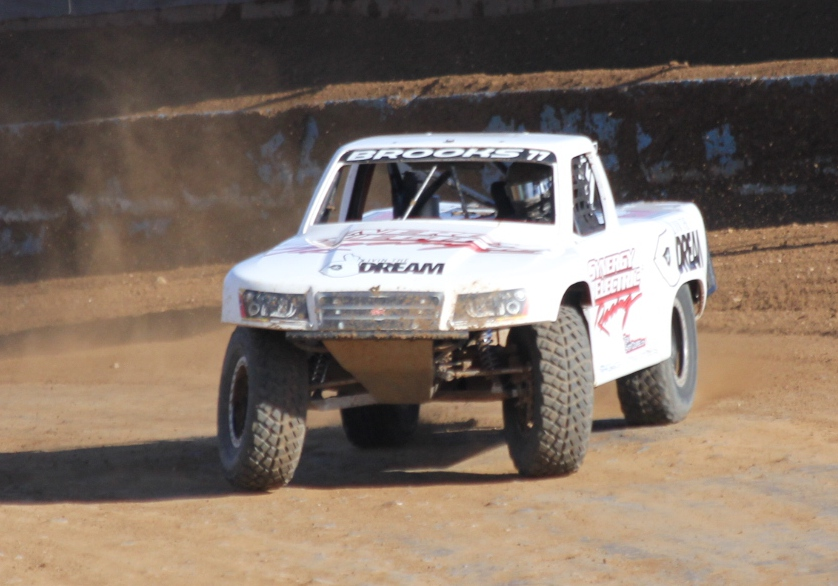
Brooks competing in the 2013 Stadium Super Trucks round at Crandon

In his youth, Brooks often visited K1 Speed and built radio-controlled cars before switching to competitive trophy kart racing. In 2008, he debuted in Championship Off-Road Racing's Junior 1 Kart class. After three years in Junior Karts, he switched to LOORRS' Modified Karts and won two races in 2010.

Brooks moved up to the Pro Lites in 2012, where he befriended driver Doug Mittag who built a new truck for him the following year. Two years later, he won his first LOORRS Pro Lite race at Las Vegas Motor Speedway in addition to racing for the TORC Pro Lite championship, which he won. He returned to LOORRS in 2015. He won two consecutive LOORRS Pro Lite tiles in 2016 and 2017.

In 2017, Brooks won in his LOORRS Pro 2 class debut at Wild Horse Pass Motorsports Park. He claimed the series' Pro 2 championship in 2019 and 2020, the former of which made him the class's youngest champion at the age of 22. His Jerett Brooks Racing operation also won 2020 Team of the Year honors. When LOORRS folded after 2020, Brooks joined Championship Off-Road's Pro 2 class.

During the Stadium Super Trucks' inaugural season in 2013, Brooks debuted at Qualcomm Stadium before winning for the first time at Crandon International Off-Road Raceway. He continued racing in the series on a sporadic basis over the next two years, which included entering X Games Austin 2014 and 2015. Brooks returned to the series for the 2017 finale at Lake Elsinore Diamond as an injury replacement for Paul Morris; he finished second in the final race to beat Matthew Brabham for the title by one point. He also ran the 2018 season opener at Lake Elsinore in Morris' truck. After not racing in SST in 2019 and 2020, Brooks rejoined the trucks at Mid-Ohio Sports Car Course in July 2021, where he led the most laps in the first race and fought with Robby Gordon for the win in the second before spinning on the final lap. Two months later, Brooks won the first race at the Grand Prix of Long Beach after using his brakes conservatively to have enough strength for the finish, a tactic that he called "pretty smart"; he finished runner-up in the second race to take the weekend victory.

Brooks retired from full-time racing after the 2022 season, where he won Championship Off-Road's Pro 2 title. Since then, he has occasionally returned to driving at marquee events like the Crandon World Championship.

== Personal life ==
A native of Alpine, California, Brooks was homeschooled in high school as his racing career interfered with his education.

== Motorsports career results ==
=== Career summary ===
Season	Series	Races	Wins	Podiums	Poles	Points	Position	Ref
2009	LOORRS Junior 1 Karts	4	0	2	N/A	146	22nd	
2009	LOORRS Junior 2 Karts	8	2	6	N/A	379	7th	
2009	LOORRS Modified Karts	10	0	1	N/A	527	8th	
2010	LOORRS Junior 2 Karts	2	1	1	N/A	83	16th	
2010	LOORRS Modified Karts	15	2	4	N/A	553	7th	
2011	LOORRS Modified Karts	15	0	5	N/A	570	5th	
2012	LOORRS Pro Lite	15	0	0	N/A	392	14th	
2013	LOORRS Pro Lite	15	0	0	N/A	292	18th	
2013	Stadium Super Trucks	5	1	2	0	108	11th	
2014	LOORRS Pro Lite	3	3	3	N/A	154	21st	
2014	Stadium Super Trucks	6	0	3	0	129	9th	
2015	LOORRS Pro Lite	16	4	8	N/A	707	**2nd**	
2015	Stadium Super Trucks	1	0	0	0	27	27th	
2016	LOORRS Pro Lite	15	7	12	N/A	710	**1st**	
2017	LOORRS Pro Lite	13	4	11	N/A	610	**1st**	
2017	LOORRS Pro 2	13	1	4	N/A	529	6th	
2017	Stadium Super Trucks	2^{1}	0	1	0	0	N/A^{1}	
2018	LOORRS Pro 2	11	0	6	N/A	484	**3rd**	
2018	Stadium Super Trucks	4	0	0	0	54	18th	
2019	LOORRS Pro 2	16	10	13	N/A	429	**1st**	
2020	LOORRS Pro 2	18	11	15	N/A	515	**1st**	
^{1} – Paul Morris credited with finishes

=== Stadium Super Trucks ===
(key) (Bold – Pole position. Italics – Fastest qualifier. * – Most laps led.)

Stadium Super Trucks results
Year	1	2	3	4	5	6	7	8	9	10	11	12	13	14	15	16	17	18	19	20	21	22	SSTC	Pts	Ref
2013	PHO	LBH	LAN	SDG; 14	SDG; 6	STL	TOR	TOR	CRA; 3	CRA; 1*	OCF	OCF	OCF	CPL; 4									11th	108	
2014	STP; 2	STP; 3	LBH; 10	IMS; 2	IMS; 4	DET	DET	DET	AUS; 4	TOR	TOR	OCF	OCF	CSS	LVV	LVV							9th	129	
2015	ADE	ADE	ADE	STP	STP	LBH	DET	DET	DET	AUS; 5	TOR	TOR	OCF	OCF	OCF	SRF	SRF	SRF	SRF	SYD	LVV	LVV	27th	27	
2017	ADE	ADE	ADE	STP	STP	LBH	LBH	PER	PER	PER	DET	DET	TEX	TEX	HID	HID	HID	BEI	GLN	GLN	ELS; 8^{†}	ELS; 2^{†}	NA	-	
2018	ELS; 10^{†}	ADE	ADE	ADE	LBH	LBH	PER	PER	DET	DET	TEX	TEX	ROA	ROA	SMP	SMP	HLN; 11	HLN; 8	MXC; 7	MXC; 7			18th	54	
2021	STP	STP	MOH	MOH	MOH; 2*	MOH; 8	NSH	NSH	LBH; 1	LBH; 2													6th	111	
2022	LBH; 5	LBH; 10	MOH	MOH	TOR	TOR	NSH	NSH	BRI	BRI													13th	31	
^{†} – Replaced Paul Morris, points went to Morris
