= Bill Hynes =

American racing driver and entrepreneur

- Nationality: American
- Born: William Hynes; January 31, 1972 (age 54) New Brunswick, New Jersey, U.S.

Stadium Super Trucks career
- Debut season: 2014
- Car number: 57
- Starts: 130
- Wins: 1
- Podiums: 6
- Poles: 0
- Best finish: 4th in 2022
- Finished last season: 7th (2024)

Previous series
- 2017–2019: Aussie Racing Cars
- Statistics up to date as of May 13, 2026.

William Hynes (born January 31, 1972) is an American professional auto racing driver and entrepreneur. He races full-time in the Stadium Super Trucks and has also competed in sports car and touring car racing. He is the founder and former CEO of United Fiber & Data, and has also overseen other business ventures such as Think Loud and 120 York.

== Early life ==
Hynes was born in New Brunswick, New Jersey on January 31, 1972. He attended Union Catholic Regional High School before moving to Hillside High School as a sophomore, though he returned to Union Catholic after getting involved in a fight. He graduated from Union Catholic in 1990.

As a junior, Hynes enlisted in the United States Army Reserve as a military police officer. After graduating high school, he served in the Gulf War and was stationed in Panama.

In 1996 and 1997, Hynes was a corrections officer recruit in the New Jersey Juvenile Justice Commission. He was later employed as an operations manager for Velocity Express in Lehigh Valley and a warehouse distribution supervisor for a Coca-Cola bottling plant in Philadelphia.

== Business ==
Hynes, who has a degree in business administration, became a real estate agent in 2002, and had holdings in Arizona and Colorado. He founded 101st Holdings LLC and held two commercial properties before its closure due to the Great Recession. Other limited liability companies formed included ADS Builders East, Inner City Investments, BKS Investments, and BKS Technologies.

In 2011, Hynes founded Think Loud Development, an urban development firm aimed at economically struggling areas in Pennsylvania, alongside members of the rock band Live. The group also formed telecommunications company United Fiber & Data (UFD) in 2012. Live departed Think Loud in 2015.

UFD constructed a 340-mile fiber-optic cable from Ashburn, Virginia to New York City in 2019. He resigned from his position as UFD's CEO in November following his arrest on burglary and stalking charges, though he remained on the company's board.

In October 2020, UFD, Powder Mill Foundation, and UFD board member Louis Appell III sued Hynes and fellow ex-CEO Chad Taylor for misusing the company's funds. The case was amicably settled in August 2022 and Hynes cleared of any wrongdoing. However, charges were filed against Hynes in 2023 claiming he stole over $4 million from United Fiber & Data by funneling money into personal accounts and unrelated businesses he was also involved in. Taylor also accused Hynes of being a confidence trickster who stole over $10 million from him and Live; after his claims were published in a Rolling Stone article about the band, Hynes filed a defamation suit in response.

In a March 2025 affidavit, Taylor stated, "Many of the implications and quotations contained in this article were based on my limited knowledge at that time, and I have subsequently learned through discovery that many of my impressions were not complete." Hynes surmised that Taylor felt "really bad about what happened because he knows I was one of his best friends."

== Racing career ==
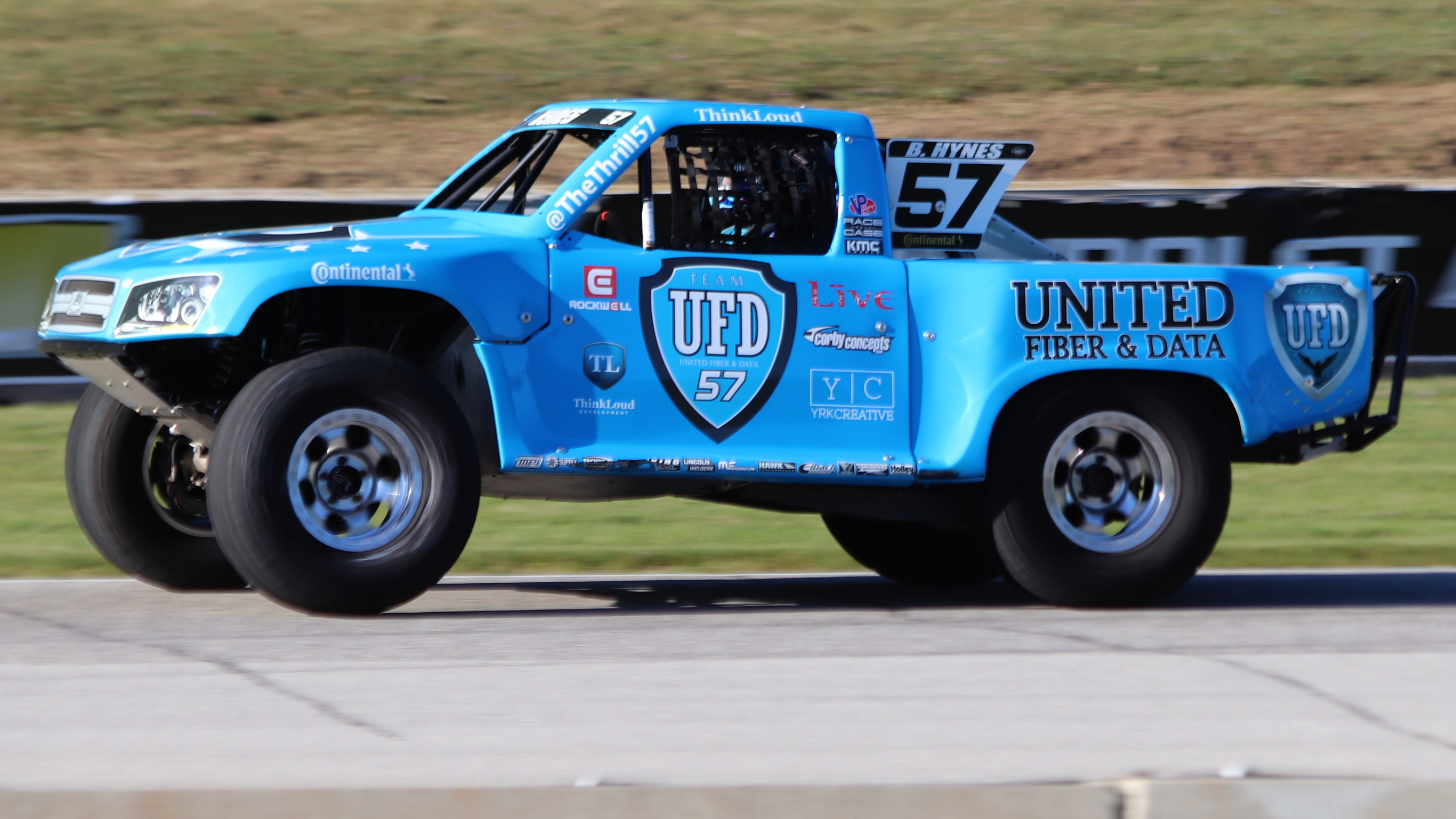
Hynes' Stadium Super Truck at Road America in 2018

A longtime racing fan and friend of Michael Andretti, Hynes began supporting Andretti's IndyCar Series team Andretti Autosport through United Fiber & Data in 2013 as an associate sponsor. UFD upgraded to a primary sponsorship on James Hinchcliffe's No. 27 car for 2014 on a one-year contract, and also sponsored the team's Indy Lights driver Matthew Brabham. The deal ended in 2015, which the Appell lawsuit alleged was worth $11 million a year and resulted in the company having to pay $9 million to the team. UFD returned to Andretti Autosport in 2016 as sponsors for Marco Andretti and Carlos Muñoz, and the former gained further backing the next season after original sponsor H. H. Gregg was on the verge of bankruptcy.

In 2014, Hynes began racing in the Stadium Super Trucks at Honda Indy Toronto. After finishing seventh in his debut, he retired from the weekend's second race after four laps with a mechanical problem. UFD sponsored his truck, and the Team UFD Racing banner was formed to support multiple trucks over the following seasons including series champions Brabham and Paul Morris, SST's first female driver Sara Price, and SST race winners Arie Luyendyk Jr. and E. J. Viso. UFD also sponsored SST's 2017 race weekend at Watkins Glen International, dubbing it the UFD at The Glen. Hynes recorded his first SST podium at the 2015 Valvoline Raceway round in Australia, where he started on the pole and finished third.

In 2016, Hynes joined the newly formed EXR Racing Series, a supercar spec racing championship. He ran as high as second in points and finished fourth. The following year, EXR's endurance racing program debuted its Mitjet EXR LV02 car at the 25 Hours of Thunderhill, where Hynes was one of the five drivers and also worked as crew chief. In August, Hynes, Brabham, and Alexandre Prémat won the EXR class at the Utah Motorsports Campus 6 Hour Enduro.

At the 2017 Clipsal 500 weekend, Hynes ran the SST races in addition to making his Aussie Racing Cars debut. Later in the year at Barbagallo Raceway, he yielded his Aussie Racing Car to fellow SST drivers Sheldon Creed and Robby Gordon as he wanted to focus on SST.

Hynes won his first career SST race in the 2018 season opener at Lake Elsinore Diamond. He initially finished ninth, but video review found that Hynes had taken his mandatory Joker Lap prior to the final lap while many of the leaders waited until said lap, which was not allowed, due to a miscommunication with race officials. Consequently, many of the leaders were bumped down the running order while Hynes was promoted to first place, which he shared with the original winner Apdaly Lopez. He scored his third podium over a year later in the final race of the Gold Coast 600 round.

2022 saw Hynes' best statistical season to date as he finished fourth in points with two podiums at Mid-Ohio and Bristol.

== Personal life ==
Hynes lives in Nazareth, Pennsylvania.

Hynes appeared in a season 14 episode of The Celebrity Apprentice in 2015. In June 2020, he launched the ThrillCast podcast alongside Meg Jones. ThrillCast has sponsored his stadium truck.

In September 2022, Hynes pled no contest to felony criminal trespass, felony theft by deception, two counts of felony forgery, misdemeanor stalking, and misdemeanor simple assault for incidents in 2018/2019 regarding a former female employee with whom he had an intimate relationship. He was sentenced to house arrest, which he completed in time for the 2023 SST season.

== Motorsports career results ==
=== Stadium Super Trucks ===
(key) (Bold – Pole position. Italics – Fastest qualifier. * – Most laps led.)

Stadium Super Trucks results
Year	1	2	3	4	5	6	7	8	9	10	11	12	13	14	15	16	17	18	19	20	21	22	SSTC	Pts	Ref
2014	STP	STP	LBH	IMS	IMS	DET	DET	DET	AUS	TOR; 7	**TOR**; 8	OCF; DNS	OCF	CSS	LVV; Rpl	LVV; 7							12th	100	
2015	ADE; 8	ADE; 8	ADE; 9	STP; 6	STP; 10	**LBH**; 9	DET; 8	DET; 10	**DET**; 10	AUS; DNQ	**TOR**; 7	TOR; 6	**OCF**; 7	OCF; 7	OCF; 8	SRF; 10	SRF; 11	**SRF**; 8	**SRF**; 7	SYD; 3	LVV; 7	LVV; 6	7th	310	
2016	ADE; 10	ADE; 10	ADE; 10	STP; 9	STP; 7	LBH; 9	**LBH**; 7	DET; 11	DET; C^{1}	DET; 7	TOW; 7	TOW; 12	TOW; 8	**TOR**; 12	**TOR**; 11	**CLT**; 9	**CLT**; 9	OCF; 9	OCF; 7	**SRF**; 7	SRF; 5	SRF; 5	5th	255	
2017	**ADE**; 11	ADE; 10	**ADE**; 11	STP; 8	STP; 9	**LBH**; 10	LBH; 10	PER; 6*	PER; 11	PER; 5*	DET; 9	DET; 7	TEX; 8	TEX; 10	**HID**; 8	**HID**; 8	**HID**; 7	**BEI**; 8*^{2}	GLN; 7	GLN; 10	ELS; 11	ELS; DNQ	7th	279	
2018	ELS; 1	**ADE**; 10	ADE; 11	**ADE**; 12	LBH; 11	LBH; 10	PER; 11	**PER**; 10	DET; 9	DET; 8	TEX; 7	TEX; 9	ROA; Rpl	ROA; Rpl	SMP	SMP	HLN	HLN	MXC	MXC			9th	208	
2019	COA; 5	COA; 7	**TEX**; 4	TEX; 7	LBH; 6	LBH; 9	TOR; 8	TOR; 5	**MOH**; 7	MOH; 7	**MOH**; 8	**MOH**; 7	ROA; 7	ROA; 5	ROA; 8	**POR**; 8	POR; 9	SRF; 7	SRF; 3				6th	375	
2020	ADE; 7	ADE; 11	ADE; 9	ROA; 10	**ROA**; 10																		N/A^{2}	–	
2021	**STP**; 7	STP; 8	MOH	MOH	MOH; 8	**MOH**; 7	NSH; 9	NSH; 10	**LBH**; 7*	LBH; 9													7th	106	
2022	**LBH**; 7*	LBH; 11	**MOH**; 3	MOH; 7	**NSH**; 9	NSH; 6	**BRI**; 2*	BRI; 8															4th	131	
2023	**LBH**; 10	**LBH**; 12	**NSH**; 8	NSH; 8																			9th	46	
2024	LBH; 7	LBH; 3	ADE	ADE	ADE	ADE																	7th	35	
2025	LBH; 6	LBH; 7																					6th	29	
2026	LBH; 4	LBH; 7																					-*	-*	

^{*} Season in progress.
^{1} The race was abandoned after Matt Mingay suffered serious injuries in a crash on lap three.
^{2} Davey Hamilton Jr. led the most laps, but his disqualification resulted in Hynes receiving the bonus points.
^{3} Standings were not recorded by the series for the 2020 season.
