= 2018 Stadium Super Trucks =

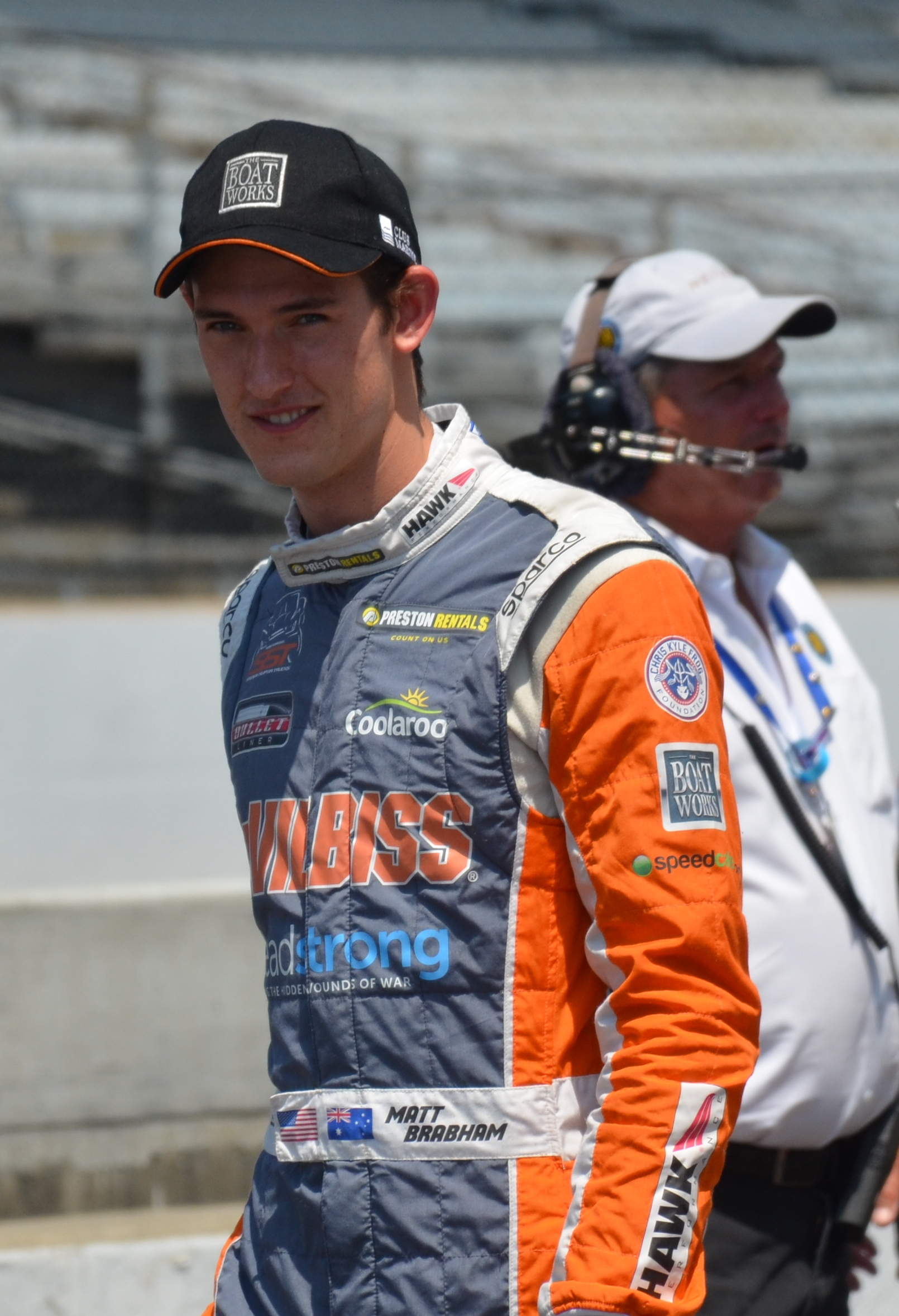
Matthew Brabham, the 2018 champion

The 2018 Speed Energy Stadium Super Trucks were the sixth season of the Stadium Super Trucks series. The season consisted of 20 races; it began on January 27, 2018 at Lake Elsinore Diamond and concluded on January 20, 2019 at Foro Sol in conjunction with the 2019 Race of Champions.

With a series-high six wins and 540 total points, Matthew Brabham won his first championship. Gavin Harlien finished second in the standings with 490 points and five wins.

== Drivers ==
No.	Driver	Races
1	(United States) Jerett Brooks	1
1	(Australia) Paul Morris	2–12, 15–16
1	(United States) Adam Andretti	13–14
5	(United States) Casey Mears	17–18
7	(United States) Robby Gordon	1–8, 11–20
7	(Canada) Russell Boyle	9–10
9	(Australia) Russell Ingall	15–16
14	(United States) Davey Hamilton Jr.	19–20
17	(Mexico) Lalo Laguna	1
18	(Mexico) Apdaly Lopez	1, 5–6, 19–20
21	(Australia) Matt Nolan	7–8
25	(United States) Arie Luyendyk Jr.	1–12, 17–18
25	(United States) Casey Mears	13–14
47	(United States) Jeff Hoffman	1
52	(United States) Davey Hamilton Jr.	5–6
55	(United States) Gavin Harlien	All
57	(United States) Bill Hynes	1–12
57	(United States) Greg Biffle	13–14
57	(United States) Sheldon Creed	17–18
57	(United States) Jerett Brooks	19–20
60	(United States) Cole Potts	All
68	(United States) Blade Hildebrand	All
73	(Japan) E. J. Chiba	11–12
74	(United States) Sheldon Creed	1
75	(United States) Erik Davis	5–6, 17–18
77	(Australia) Travis Milburn	2–4, 7–8
77	(United States) Jerett Brooks	17–18
83	(Australia) Matthew Brabham	All
87	(Australia) Toby Price	2–4
88	(Australia) Tommy Dawson	13–14
410	(Australia) Greg Gartner	2–4, 7–8
441	(United States) Troy Diede	5–6
Sources: (Note: Sorted by round: Lake Elsinore (Race 1); Adelaide (Races 2–4); Long Beach (Races 5–6); Perth (Races 7–8); Detroit (Races 9–10); Texas (Races 11–12); Road America (Races 13–14); Sydney (Races 15–16); Glen Helen (Races 17–18); Race of Champions (Races 19–20))

== Schedule ==
Round	Track	Location	Date	Supporting
1	Lake Elsinore Diamond	Lake Elsinore, California	January 27	Standalone
2	Adelaide Street Circuit	Adelaide, South Australia	March 2–4	Adelaide 500
3	Long Beach Street Circuit	Long Beach, California	April 14–15	Toyota Grand Prix of Long Beach
4	Barbagallo Raceway	Neerabup, Western Australia	May 5–6	Perth SuperSprint
5	Raceway at Belle Isle Park	Detroit, Michigan	June 2–3	Chevrolet Detroit Grand Prix
6	Texas Motor Speedway	Fort Worth, Texas	June 9	DXC Technology 600
7	Road America	Elkhart Lake, Wisconsin	August 24–25	Johnsonville 180
8	Sydney Motorsport Park	(Australia) Eastern Creek, New South Wales	October 27–28	Australian Motor Racing Championships
9	Glen Helen Raceway	San Bernardino, California	December 1–2	Robby Gordon Off-Road World Championships
10	Foro Sol	Autódromo Hermanos Rodríguez, Mexico City	January 19–20, 2019	2019 Race of Champions

== Season summary ==
The season began at the Lake Elsinore Diamond, where the 2017 finale had been held. Apdaly Lopez won the Feature event, but confusion arose in the days following the race as multiple drivers took the Joker Lap on the final lap, which is not allowed per series rules. After video review by series officials, Bill Hynes – who ran the Joker on the penultimate lap – was declared the winner, though Lopez was allowed to keep his win. Matthew Brabham, who finished seventh, was also revealed to have utilized the same strategy as Hynes, and had his finishing position upgraded to second alongside Jeff Hoffman.

A tripleheader at Australia's Adelaide Street Circuit followed. In the first race, rookie Cole Potts took advantage of Robby Gordon's transmission problem and Brabham locking his brakes entering a turn to win his first SST race. Gordon rebounded to win the second, while Brabham won the final round; Gordon had been in position to win the third race when he entered the final corner too deep, allowing Brabham to capitalize and win. Behind him, Gavin Harlien's truck landed off a jump at a poor angle, resulting in a broken right rear wheel that caused him to hit the wall. Harlien continued to accelerate until he crossed the start/finish line to finish sixth.

At the Grand Prix of Long Beach, the first race was stopped after Apdaly Lopez rolled his truck with 17 minutes left; race officials chose not to resume the event and leader Harlien was declared the winner, scoring his maiden series victory. Series commentator Sean Sermini criticized the decision during the broadcast, calling it "Very upsetting." Brabham won the second round of the weekend.

In May, the series returned to Australia to race at Barbagallo Raceway in Perth. Matt Nolan, running his first points race, flipped while jumping on a ramp in the first event, causing his truck's left rear wheel to come off; the wheel eventually hit a vacant spectator bridge. The incident eventually spurred the Confederation of Australian Motor Sport (CAMS) to suspend the series from CAMS-sanctioned races for safety concerns, though SST officials were not notified of the news until July. The weekend concluded with Arie Luyendyk Jr. and Jeff Hoffman scoring their first series wins, while Brabham recorded the overall weekend win.

Harlien and Luyendyk won at Detroit, the former holding off Aaron Bambach and Luyendyk for the win in the first race. Six laps into the second round, Luyendyk was the race leader when the red flag came out for Paul Morris' wreck in turn three that sent him airborne and onto his truck's roof after hitting a tire barrier.

The series returned to Texas Motor Speedway for a second year in June. Japanese rally driver E. J. Chiba made his series debut, while Gordon returned for the weekend after missing the Detroit weekend to race in the Baja 500. On lap 16 of 18, Harlien passed Morris for the lead and eventually won Race One, while Brabham took advantage of the field fighting among themselves for position to win Race Two.

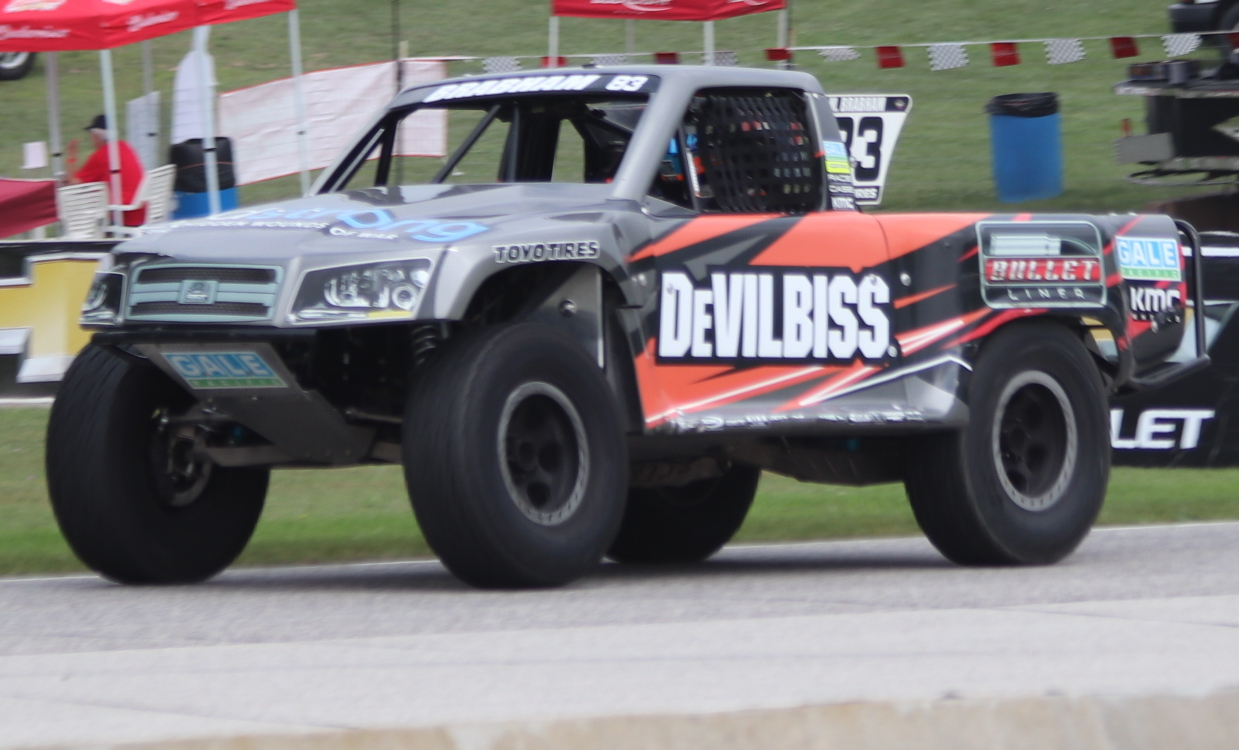
Brabham competing at Road America

In August, the trucks made their debut at Road America in support of the NASCAR Xfinity Series' Johnsonville 180, running a shortened course that bypassed turns 6–12, though the full circuit was utilized for the final laps. NASCAR drivers Casey Mears and Greg Biffle competed in the weekend, the latter making his SST debut. Gordon and Brabham won the weekend's races, while Biffle finished second in the latter.

Nolan's wreck at Perth and the CAMS suspension forced the series' planned competition in October's Gold Coast 600 at Surfers Paradise to be called off. During the month, the series, represented by Queen's Counsel barrister Stewart Anderson, went to court against CAMS in a case overseen by the Supreme Court of Victoria. Anderson argued new wheels would be built with forged billet aluminium that makes them heavier and less likely to detach than the current cast alloy; in an inspection conducted by retired V8 Supercar driver Larry Perkins, he gave his approval of the trucks and pointed out their safety was comparable to the Supercars. Anderson also claimed CAMS and SST had formed an agreement in February in which the former agreed the series was being operated within CAMS' satisfaction, while the delay until July to inform SST officials was a breach of contract. On October 11, judge John Digby ruled in favor of CAMS. The ban would not be lifted until August 2019.

Six days after the trial, SST partnered with the Australian Auto Sport Alliance, which is not affiliated with CAMS, and the Australian Motor Racing Series (AMRS), ensuring the series' future in the country. After a risk assessment, the AASA and NSW Sport and Recreation approved the series for competition in AMRS event. The trucks' first race weekend under the AMRS banner took place nine days later at the Sydney Motorsport Park, won by Brabham and Harlien. 2005 V8 Supercar Championship Series champion Russell Ingall contested his first SST weekend.

To close out the 2018 calendar year, the series participated in the Robby Gordon Off-Road World Championships at Glen Helen Raceway. Hoffman and Harlien were victorious in the two rounds, while Brabham finished second in both races, placing him in position to win the championship.

The 2019 Race of Champions at Autódromo Hermanos Rodríguez's Foro Sol in Mexico City served as the season finale. Due to the Race of Champions' track and race format, the trucks utilized a head-to-head bracket system in which two drivers competed against each other, with the winner advancing to the next round; should a driver lose in the first two rounds, they may proceed if they were the fastest of the defeated drivers as the "Fastest Loser". After three rounds, the final two drivers competed in the final round. Gordon won Saturday's racing after defeating Brabham, while Brabham clinched the championship when he won against Harlien in the third round on Sunday; Brabham ended the 2018 season by beating Hoffman in the final.

== Results and standings ==
=== Race results ===
Round	Race	Event	Fastest qualifier	Pole position	Most laps led	Winning driver	Ref
1	H1	Lake Elsinore	(United States) Jerett Brooks	(United States) Robby Gordon	—N/a	(United States) Robby Gordon	
1	H2	Lake Elsinore	(United States) Jerett Brooks	(United States) Blade Hildebrand	—N/a	(United States) Sheldon Creed	
1	1	Lake Elsinore	(United States) Jerett Brooks	(United States) Jeff Hoffman	(United States) Robby Gordon	(Mexico) Apdaly Lopez (United States) Bill Hynes	
2	2	Adelaide	(Australia) Matthew Brabham	(United States) Bill Hynes	(United States) Cole Potts	(United States) Cole Potts	
2	3	Adelaide	(Australia) Matthew Brabham	(Australia) Toby Price	(United States) Robby Gordon	(United States) Robby Gordon	
2	4	Adelaide	(Australia) Matthew Brabham	(United States) Bill Hynes	(United States) Robby Gordon	(Australia) Matthew Brabham	
3	5	Long Beach	(United States) Robby Gordon	(United States) Arie Luyendyk Jr.	(United States) Arie Luyendyk Jr.	(United States) Gavin Harlien	
3	6	Long Beach	(United States) Robby Gordon	(United States) Aaron Bambach	(Australia) Matthew Brabham (United States) Jeff Hoffman	(Australia) Matthew Brabham	
4	7	Perth	(Australia) Matthew Brabham	(Australia) Matt Nolan	(United States) Arie Luyendyk Jr.	(United States) Arie Luyendyk Jr.	
4	8	Perth	(Australia) Matthew Brabham	(United States) Bill Hynes	(United States) Cole Potts	(United States) Jeff Hoffman	
5	9	Detroit	(Australia) Matthew Brabham	(Canada) Russell Boyle	(United States) Aaron Bambach	(United States) Gavin Harlien	
5	10	Detroit	(Australia) Matthew Brabham	(United States) Cole Potts	(United States) Arie Luyendyk Jr.	(United States) Arie Luyendyk Jr.	
6	11	Texas	(Australia) Matthew Brabham	(United States) Aaron Bambach	(Australia) Paul Morris	(United States) Gavin Harlien	
6	12	Texas	(Australia) Matthew Brabham	(United States) Blade Hildebrand	(Australia) Matthew Brabham	(Australia) Matthew Brabham	
7	13	Road America	(United States) Blade Hildebrand	(Australia) Tommy Dawson	(Australia) Matthew Brabham	(United States) Robby Gordon	
7	14	Road America	(United States) Blade Hildebrand	(United States) Adam Andretti	(United States) Jeff Hoffman	(Australia) Matthew Brabham	
8	15	Sydney	(Australia) Matthew Brabham	(Australia) Matthew Brabham	(United States) Gavin Harlien	(Australia) Matthew Brabham	
8	16	Sydney	(Australia) Matthew Brabham	(United States) Blade Hildebrand	(United States) Blade Hildebrand	(United States) Gavin Harlien	
9	17	Glen Helen	(United States) Sheldon Creed	Land rush start	(United States) Sheldon Creed	(United States) Jeff Hoffman	
9	18	Glen Helen	(United States) Sheldon Creed	Land rush start	(United States) Jerett Brooks	(United States) Gavin Harlien	
10	19	Race of Champions	(United States) Robby Gordon	Head-to-head system	—N/a	(United States) Robby Gordon	
10	20	Race of Champions	(United States) Robby Gordon	Head-to-head system	—N/a	(Australia) Matthew Brabham	

==== Race of Champions ====
**January 19**

Seed	Driver 1	Seed	Driver 2
Round 1
**1**	(United States) **Robby Gordon**	10	(Mexico) Apdaly Lopez
**2**	(United States) **Blade Hildebrand**	9	(United States) Jerett Brooks
**3**	(United States) **Jeff Hoffman**	8	(United States) Casey Mears
**4**	(Australia) **Matthew Brabham**	7	(United States) Cole Potts
5	(United States) Davey Hamilton Jr.	**6**	(United States) **Gavin Harlien**
Round 2
**1**	(United States) **Robby Gordon**	3	(United States) Jeff Hoffman
2	(United States) Blade Hildebrand	**4**	(Australia) **Matthew Brabham**
**6**	(United States) **Gavin Harlien**	7	(United States) Cole Potts
Round 3
**1**	(United States) **Robby Gordon**	6	(United States) Gavin Harlien
**4**	(Australia) **Matthew Brabham**	7	(United States) Cole Potts
Final
**1**	(United States) **Robby Gordon**	4	(Australia) Matthew Brabham

**January 20**

Seed	Driver 1	Seed	Driver 2
Round 1
**4**	(Australia) **Matthew Brabham**	5	(United States) Davey Hamilton Jr.
**2**	(United States) **Blade Hildebrand**	9	(United States) Jerett Brooks
**3**	(United States) **Jeff Hoffman**	8	(United States) Casey Mears
**1**	(United States) **Robby Gordon**	7	(United States) Cole Potts
**6**	(United States) **Gavin Harlien**	10	(Mexico) Apdaly Lopez
Round 2
**1**	(United States) Robby Gordon	7	(United States) Cole Potts
2	(United States) Blade Hildebrand	**3**	(United States) **Jeff Hoffman**
**4**	(Australia) **Matthew Brabham**	6	(United States) Gavin Harlien
Round 3
1	(United States) Robby Gordon	**4**	(Australia) **Matthew Brabham**
**3**	(United States) **Jeff Hoffman**	7	(United States) Cole Potts
Final
3	(United States) Jeff Hoffman	**4**	(Australia) **Matthew Brabham**

- Bold – Won round
- Italics – Fastest loser
- Seed set by qualifying times

=== Drivers' championship ===
Rank	Driver	(California) ELS			(Australia) ADE			(California) LBH		(Australia) PER		(Michigan) DET		(Texas) TEX		(Wisconsin) ROA		(Australia) SMP		(California) HLN		(Mexico) MXC		Points
Rank	Driver	H1	H2	F	(Australia) ADE			(California) LBH		(Australia) PER		(Michigan) DET		(Texas) TEX		(Wisconsin) ROA		(Australia) SMP		(California) HLN		(Mexico) MXC		Points
1	(Australia) Matthew Brabham		6	2	3	3	1*	4	1*	7	4	4	2	10	1*	2*	1	**1**	9	2	2	2	1	540
2	(United States) Gavin Harlien		3	3	6	2	6	1	3	9	6	1	3	1	2	3	5	2*	1	4	1	4^{3}	5^{2}	490
3	(United States) Robby Gordon	**1**		4*	11	1*	10*	2	4	5	11	Rpl^{‡}	Rpl^{‡}	5	3	1	6	4	4	10	5	1	4^{3}	410
4	(United States) Jeff Hoffman	2		**2**	4	12	4	12	12*	2	1	8	4	3	8	12	4*	5	8	1	3	5^{2}	2	377
5	(United States) Cole Potts		2	5	1*	8	11	7	2	8	2*	10	**7**	4	5	8	8	3	3	8	6	3	3	369
6	(United States) Blade Hildebrand		**5**	7	7	9	5	6	11	4	3	5	5	11	**6**	4	3	9	**6***	12	4	6^{2}	6^{2}	341
7	(United States) Arie Luyendyk Jr.	4		9	2	5	7	**3***	14	1*	8	3	1*	6	10	Rpl^{#}	Rpl^{#}			3	11			305
8	(Australia) Paul Morris	Rpl^{†}		Rpl^{†}	8	4	8	10	5	3	5	9	10	2*	4			6	2					249
9	(United States) Bill Hynes		4	1	**10**	11	**12**	11	10	11	**10**	9	8	7	9	Rpl^{#}	Rpl^{#}							208
10	(United States) Aaron Bambach							14	**6**			2*	6	**9**	7	5	7			9				132
11	(Australia) Travis Milburn				5	6	2			6	7													95
12	(Mexico) Apdaly Lopez	3		1				13	9													10^{1}	10^{1}	81
13	(United States) Sheldon Creed		1	6																**6***	9			62
14	(Australia) Greg Gartner				9	7	9			10	9													61
15	(Australia) Matt Nolan									**12**	DNS					9	10	**8**	**7**					59
16	(United States) Davey Hamilton Jr.							5	7													9^{1}	8^{1}	58
17	(United States) Erik Davis							8	8											5	7			56
18	(United States) Jerett Brooks	5^{†}		10^{†}																11	8*	7^{1}	7^{1}	54
19	(United States) Casey Mears															6^{#}	12^{#}			7	10	8^{1}	9^{1}	50
20	(Australia) Toby Price				12	**10**	3																	40
21	(Australia) Russell Ingall																	7	5					30
22	(Japan) E. J. Chiba													8	11									23
23	(United States) Adam Andretti															11	**9**							23
24	(Australia) Tommy Dawson															**10**	11							21
25	(United States) Troy Diede							9	13															20
26	(Mexico) Lalo Laguna	6		8																				17
	(United States) Greg Biffle															7^{#}	2^{#}							0
	(Canada) Russell Boyle											**7**^{‡}	9^{‡}											0
Rank	Driver	(California) ELS			(Australia) ADE			(California) LBH		(Australia) PER		(Michigan) DET		(Texas) TEX		(Wisconsin) ROA		(Australia) SMP		(California) GHR		(Mexico) MXC		Points
Rank	Driver	H1	H2	F	(Australia) ADE			(California) LBH		(Australia) PER		(Michigan) DET		(Texas) TEX		(Wisconsin) ROA		(Australia) SMP		(California) GHR		(Mexico) MXC		Points
^{1, 2, 3} Round in which driver was eliminated

Legend
Color	Result
Gold	Winner
Silver	2nd place
Bronze	3rd place
Green	4th–5th place (Top 5)
Light Blue	6th–10th place (Top 10)
Dark Blue	Finished (Outside Top 10)
Purple	Did not finish (DNF)
Red	Did not qualify (DNQ)
Brown	Withdrew (Wth)
Black	Disqualified (DSQ)
White	Did not start (DNS)
White	Race cancelled or abandoned (C)
Blank	Did not participate (DNP)
Blank	Driver replacement (Rpl)
Blank	Race not held (NH)
Blank	Not competing

**In-line notation**
**Bold**	Pole position (1 point; except Indy)
Italics	Ran fastest race lap
^{L}	Led race lap (1 point)
*	Led most race laps (2 points)
^{1–12}	Indy 500 "Fast Twelve" bonus points
^{c}	Qualifying canceled (no bonus point)
RY	Rookie of the Year
R	Rookie

Points	Position														
Points	1st	2nd	3rd	4th	5th	6th	7th	8th	9th	10th	11th	12th	13th	14th	15th
Heat	12	10	8	7	5	4	3	2	1						
Final	25	22	20	18	16	15	14	13	12	11	10	9	8	7	6

Bonuses
Most laps led	3
Position gained	1
Fastest qualifier	1

==== Driver replacements ====
Key	No.	Original driver	Replacement driver	Race
†	1	Paul Morris	Jerett Brooks	Lake Elsinore
‡	7	Robby Gordon	Russell Boyle	Detroit
#	25	Arie Luyendyk Jr.	Casey Mears	Road America
#	57	Bill Hynes	Greg Biffle	Road America
All points scored by the replacement went to the original driver.
