= 2013 Stadium Super Trucks =

Seasons
- ← none 2014 →

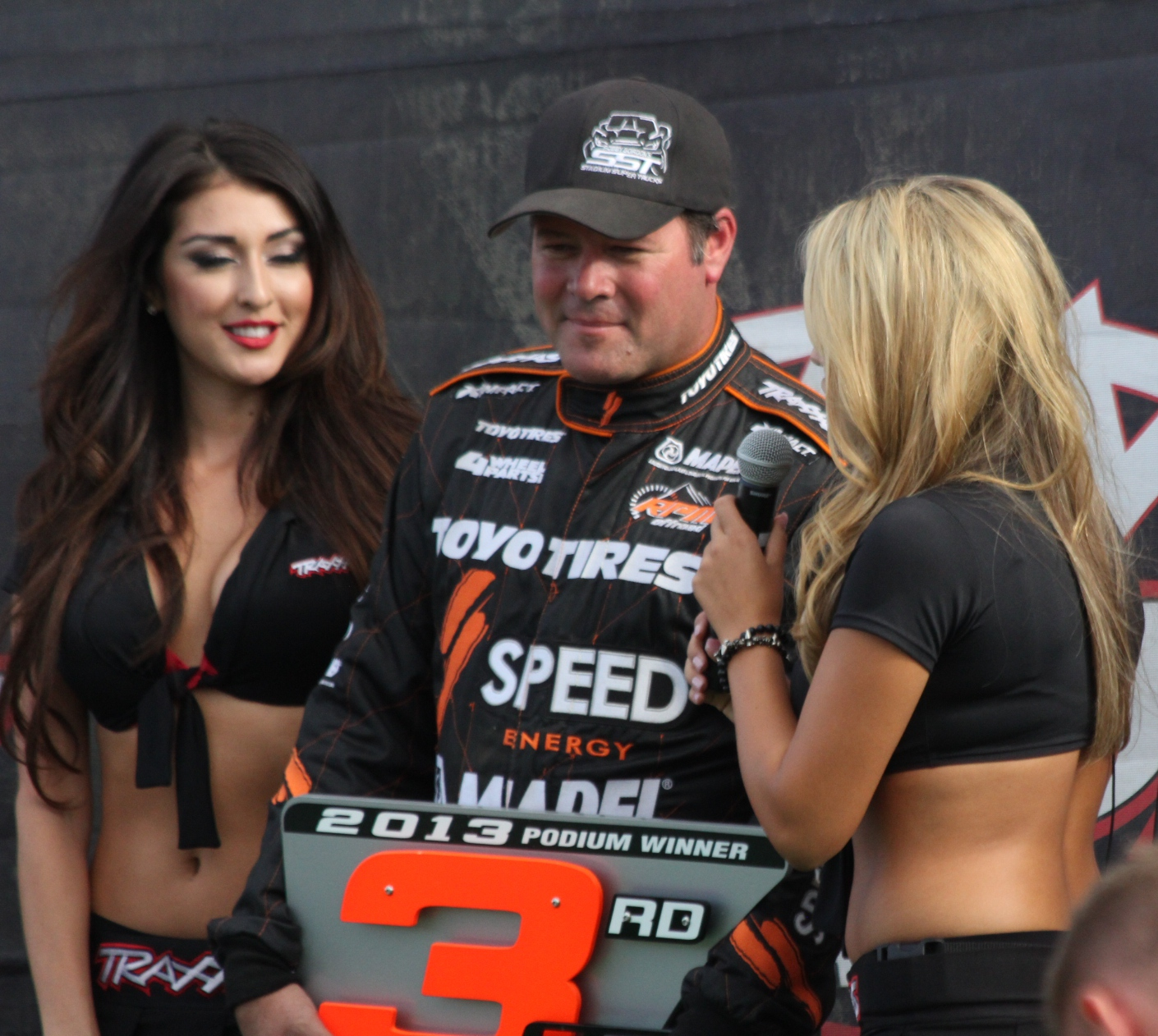
Robby Gordon, the 2013 Stadium Super Trucks champion

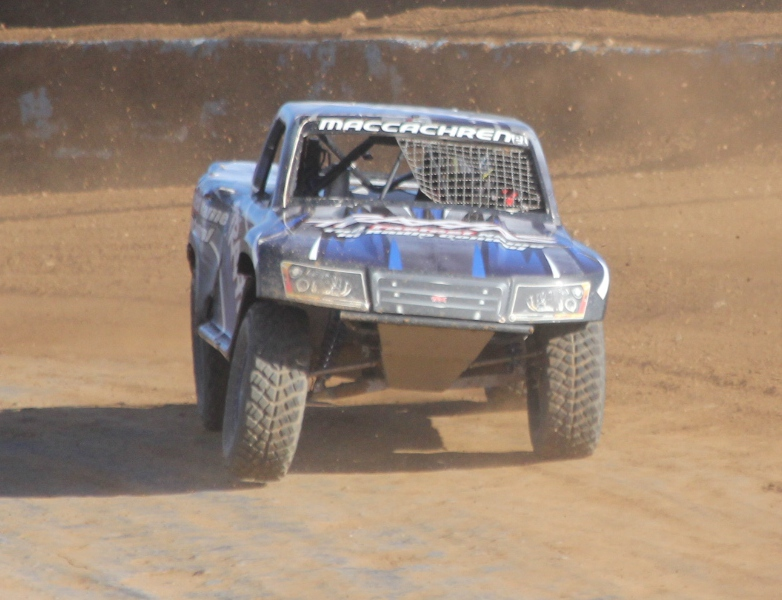
Rob MacCachren finished second in the championship

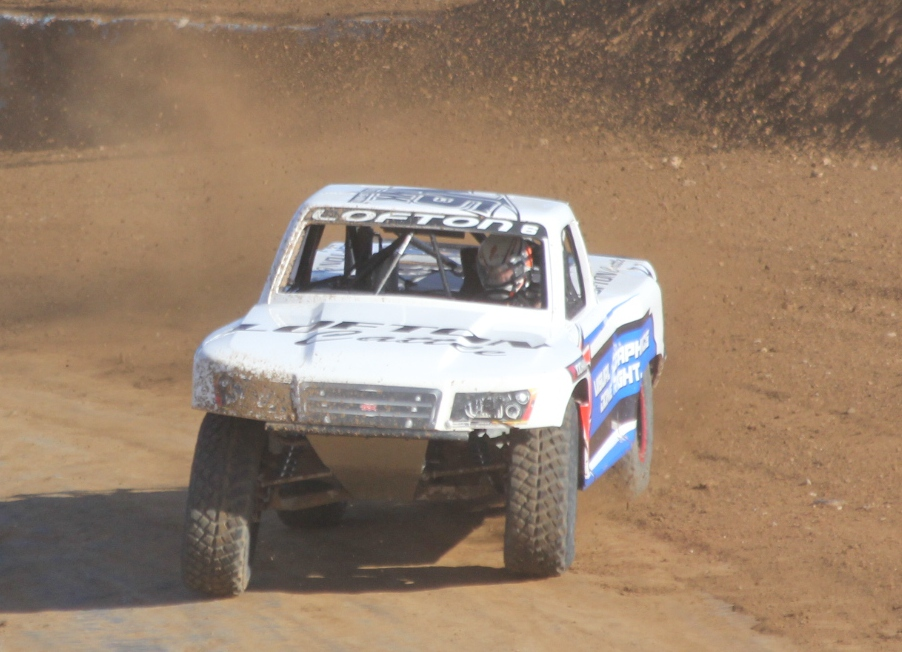
Justin Lofton finished third in the championship

The 2013 Stadium Super Trucks were the inaugural season of Stadium Super Trucks competition. The series marked the revival of off-road racing in stadiums, originally created by Mickey Thompson, and reintroduced by former NASCAR driver Robby Gordon. The trucks were one of four classes available, along with Bigfoot Monster Trucks, Super Trophy Karts, and Super Buggys.

The champion was awarded the Mickey Thompson Championship Trophy. Gordon won the championship by seven points over Rob MacCachren.

== Drivers ==
No.	Driver	Races
3	(Canada) Paul Tracy	7–8
4	(United States) Jeff Ward	1–4
4	(United States) Brock Heger	9–10
5	(United States) Ricky Johnson	2–5
5	(Mexico) Apdaly Lopez	6
5	(United States) Rino Navera	11–12
5	(United States) BJ Baldwin	13
6	(United States) Justin Lofton	1–13
7	(United States) Robby Gordon	All
8	(United States) Justin Matney	1–4, 6
8	(United States) Jessie Johnson	5
10	(United States) Greg Adler	1–3, 5
10	(United States) Adrian Cenni	4
11	(United States) Adrian Cenni	3
11	(United States) Brock Heger	13
12	(United States) Nick Baumgartner	1–6
12	(United States) Davey Hamilton	7
17	(Mexico) Lalo Laguna	1–6
18	(Mexico) Apdaly Lopez	11–13
21	(United States) Rob MacCachren	1–10, 14
21	(United States) Keegan Kincaid	11–13
25	(United States) Arie Luyendyk Jr.	1–6, 14
32	(United States) Townsend Bell	7
32	(United States) Davey Hamilton	8
47	(United States) Mike Jenkins	1–5, 9–13
47	(United States) Keegan Kincaid	6, 14
48	(United States) Scotty Steele	9–10, 13–14
53	(United States) Greg Foster	11–13
59	(United States) Craig Potts	9–14
74	(United States) Sheldon Creed	4–10, 13–14
77	(United States) Jerett Brooks	4–5, 9–10, 14
88	(United States) Austin Kimbrell	1
98	(United States) P. J. Jones	All
99	(United States) Kyle LeDuc	14
Sources: (Note: Sorted by round: Phoenix (Race 1); Long Beach (Race 2); Log Angeles (Race 3); San Diego 1 (Race 4); San Diego 2 (Race 5); St. Louis (Race 6); Toronto (Races 7–8); Crandon (Races 9–10); Costa Mesa (Races 11–13); Las Vegas (Race 14))

== Schedule ==
Round	Track	Location	Date
1	University of Phoenix Stadium	Glendale, Arizona	April 6
2	Long Beach Street Circuit	Long Beach, California	April 21
3	Los Angeles Memorial Coliseum	Los Angeles, California	April 27
4	Qualcomm Stadium	San Diego, California	May 4
5	Qualcomm Stadium	San Diego, California	May 18
6	Edward Jones Dome	St. Louis, Missouri	June 8
7	Honda Indy Toronto	(Canada) Toronto, Ontario	July 13
8	Crandon International Off-Road Raceway	Crandon, Wisconsin	August 30–September 1
9	OC Fair & Event Center (Sand Sports Super Show)	Costa Mesa, California	September 20–22
10	Caesars Palace	Las Vegas, Nevada	November 7

== Season summary ==
Robby Gordon organized an exhibition race at Crandon International Off-Road Raceway in September 2012 for the series to test their equipment. Numerous TORC and LOORS off-road drivers were invited to participate.

The opening race of the season, at University of Phoenix Stadium, initially was led by Justin Matney until Lalo Laguna passed him on lap 2. However, Laguna lost the lead to Rob MacCachren after hitting the water barrier and MacCachren dominated the rest of the race. Next, the series traveled to Long Beach for the Grand Prix of Long Beach, where ramps were added to the track. Justin Lofton won the race. SST remained in southern California at the Los Angeles Memorial Coliseum, racing on the first asphalt track laid in the stadium, and at Qualcomm Stadium in San Diego, where future series and NASCAR Gander RV & Outdoors Truck Series champion Sheldon Creed made his debut.

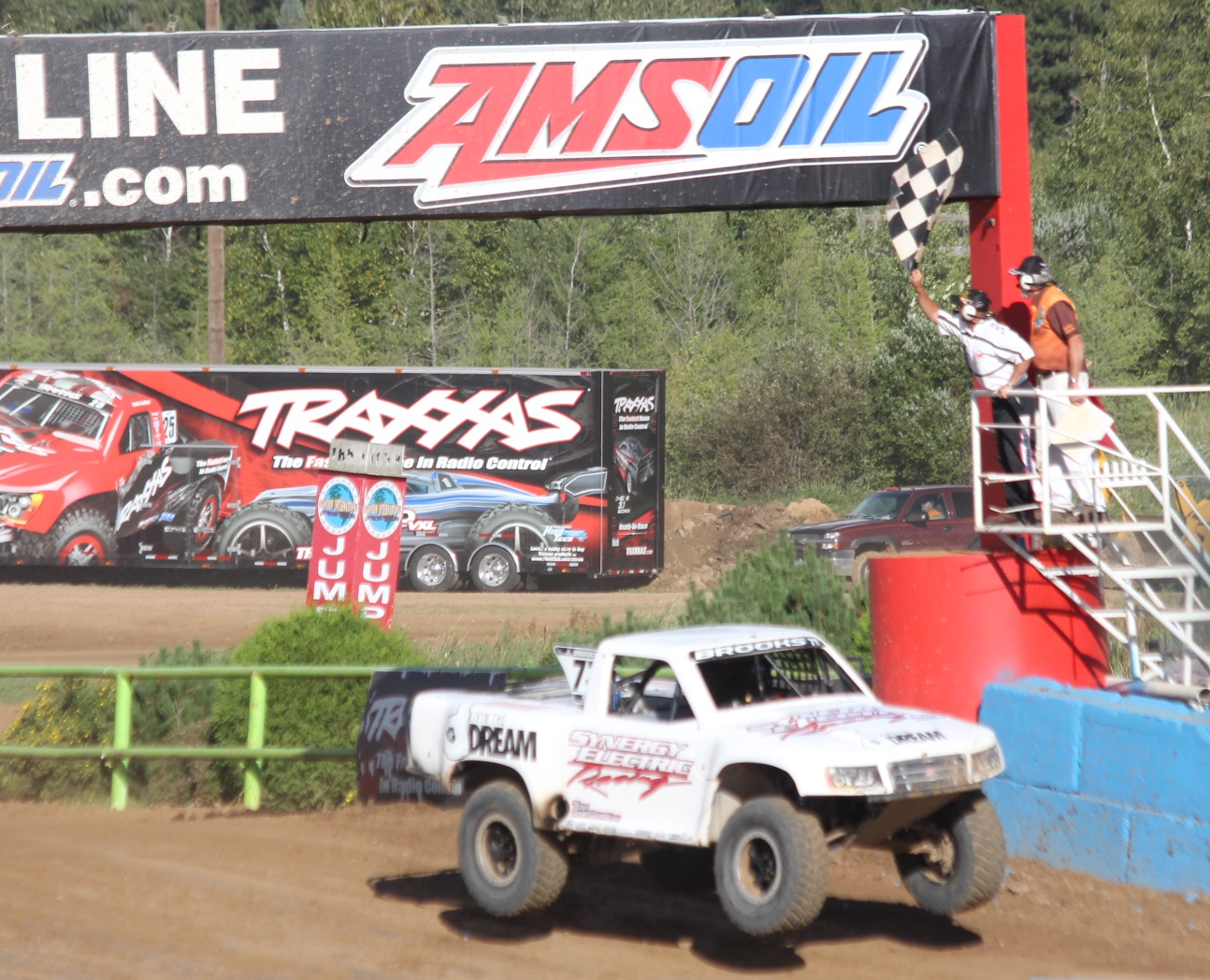
Jerett Brooks winning at Crandon

At the Edward Jones Dome, MacCachren triumphed. The next race was scheduled to occur at Soldier Field, but was eventually canceled. Dates at the Georgia Dome, Cowboys Stadium, and the Hubert H. Humphrey Metrodome were also called off. The Honda Indy Toronto road course was a late addition to the series schedule as a doubleheader. Justin Lofton and Creed won the Saturday and Sunday races, respectively.

The next stop was Crandon, with MacCachren claiming his fourth win of the season in the first race on Friday night. In the second race on Sunday afternoon, the trucks raced the track in the opposite direction for the second half of the 12-lap event. Creed and Jerett Brooks battled for the win, with the latter winning.

The next three rounds were held at Sand Sports Super Show. Robby Gordon dueled with Lofton throughout the first race until Lofton struck a water barrier as Gordon won. Lofton subsequently suffered from mechanical issues and finished fifth. In the next round, pole-sitter Mike Jenkins entered turn 2 too quickly and rolled over, giving Apdaly Lopez the lead, though Lofton passed him. As in the previous race, Lofton and Gordon battled for the victory, but a miscue by Gordon allowed Lofton to get the win. Lofton and Gordon continued to dominate the track as they started first and second, respectively, in the third race. With the invert, Lopez led, and at the lap six restart, Gordon suffered damage to his truck and rolled over. Gordon was able to make a late charge, but Creed eventually won.

The season finale was held at Caesars Palace in Las Vegas, held concurrently with the SEMA auto show. In the race, P. J. Jones claimed his first win of the season, while Gordon won the championship by just seven points over MacCachren.

== Results and standings ==
=== Race results ===
Round	Race	Event	Fastest qualifier	Pole position	Winning driver	Ref
1	H1	Phoenix	(United States) Justin Lofton	(United States) Nick Baumgartner	(United States) Justin Lofton	
1	H2	Phoenix	(United States) Justin Lofton	(United States) Greg Adler	(United States) Greg Adler	
1	LCQ	Phoenix	(United States) Justin Lofton	(United States) Justin Matney	(United States) Justin Matney	
1	1	Phoenix	(United States) Justin Lofton	(United States) Justin Matney	(United States) Rob MacCachren	
2	2	Long Beach	(United States) Justin Lofton	(United States) Nick Baumgartner	(United States) Justin Lofton	
3	H1	Los Angeles	(United States) Robby Gordon	(United States) Justin Matney	(United States) Arie Luyendyk Jr.	
3	H2	Los Angeles	(United States) Robby Gordon	(United States) P. J. Jones	(United States) P. J. Jones	
3	LCQ	Los Angeles	(United States) Robby Gordon	(United States) Justin Lofton	(United States) Justin Lofton	
3	3	Los Angeles	(United States) Robby Gordon	(United States) Robby Gordon	(United States) Robby Gordon	
4	H1	San Diego	(United States) Robby Gordon	(United States) Arie Luyendyk Jr.	(United States) Justin Lofton	
4	H2	San Diego	(United States) Robby Gordon	(United States) Justin Matney	(United States) P. J. Jones	
4	LCQ	San Diego	(United States) Robby Gordon	—N/a	(United States) Robby Gordon	
4	4	San Diego	(United States) Robby Gordon	(United States) Ricky Johnson	(United States) Rob MacCachren	
5	H1	San Diego	(United States) Sheldon Creed	(Mexico) Lalo Laguna	(United States) Robby Gordon	
5	H2	San Diego	(United States) Sheldon Creed	(United States) Mike Jenkins	(United States) Rob MacCachren	
5	LCQ	San Diego	(United States) Sheldon Creed	(United States) Justin Lofton	(United States) Ricky Johnson	
5	5	San Diego	(United States) Sheldon Creed	(United States) Arie Luyendyk Jr.	(United States) Robby Gordon	
6	H1	St. Louis	(United States) Rob MacCachren	(United States) Nick Baumgartner	(United States) Rob MacCachren	
6	H2	St. Louis	(United States) Rob MacCachren	(United States) Justin Matney	(United States) P. J. Jones	
6	LCQ	St. Louis	(United States) Rob MacCachren	(United States) Sheldon Creed	(United States) Sheldon Creed	
6	6	St. Louis	(United States) Rob MacCachren	(United States) Arie Luyendyk Jr.	(United States) Rob MacCachren	
7	7	Toronto	(United States) Sheldon Creed	(United States) Rob MacCachren	(United States) Justin Lofton	
7	8	Toronto	(United States) Sheldon Creed	(Canada) Paul Tracy	(United States) Sheldon Creed	
8	9	Crandon	(United States) Sheldon Creed	(United States) Sheldon Creed	(United States) Rob MacCachren	
8	10	Crandon	(United States) Sheldon Creed	(United States) Craig Potts	(United States) Jerett Brooks	
9	11	Costa Mesa	(United States) Justin Lofton	(United States) Mike Jenkins	(United States) Robby Gordon	
9	12	Costa Mesa	(United States) Robby Gordon	(United States) Mike Jenkins	(United States) Justin Lofton	
9	13	Costa Mesa	(United States) Justin Lofton	(Mexico) Apdaly Lopez	(United States) Sheldon Creed	
10	H1	Las Vegas	(United States) Keegan Kincaid	—N/a	(United States) Kyle LeDuc	
10	H2	Las Vegas	(United States) Keegan Kincaid	—N/a	(United States) Robby Gordon	
10	14	Las Vegas	(United States) Keegan Kincaid	(United States) Rob MacCachren	(United States) P. J. Jones	

=== Drivers' championship ===
Rank	Driver	(Arizona) PHO				(California) LBH	(California) LAN				(California) SDG								(Missouri) STL				(Canada) TOR		(Wisconsin) CRA		(California) OCF			(Nevada) CPL			Pts
Rank	Driver	H1	H2	LCQ	F	(California) LBH	H1	H2	LCQ	F	H1	H2	LCQ	F	H1	H2	LCQ	F	H1	H2	LCQ	F	(Canada) TOR		(Wisconsin) CRA		(California) OCF			H1	H2	F	Pts
1	(United States) Robby Gordon		2		3	2	3			**1**	4		1	3	1			1*	6		2	2	6	2	2	3	1*	2	4		1	2	407
2	(United States) Rob MacCachren	2			1	3		2		2	2			1		1		3	1			1*	**2**	4	1	4					2	**6**	400
3	(United States) Justin Lofton	1			11	1	7		**1**	9	1			9	4		**2**	9		5		6	1*	5	6	9	5	1*	2				295
4	(United States) P. J. Jones		3		5	5		**1**		3		1		5		6	7	8		1		11	5	6	9	10	9	5	3	2		1*	289
5	(United States) Sheldon Creed										6		2	10		2		2		4	**1**	8	3	1*	**8**	2			1*		3	7	215
6	(United States) Mike Jenkins	4		5	9	6	5		4	7	7		4	11		**5**	5	13							7	7	**7**	**6**	7				208
7	(United States) Arie Luyendyk Jr.		6	3	4	7	1			11	**5**		5	4	3			**4**	3			**12**								3		5	154
8	(United States) Ricky Johnson					4	2			13		2		**2***	5		1	5															123
9	(United States) Nick Baumgartner	**6**		6	6	**10**	4		3	4		6	7	12	2			11	**2**			3											120
10	(United States) Greg Adler		**1**		7	11		4	2	8						4	3	7															118
11	(United States) Jerett Brooks											5	3	14		3		6							3	1*				4		4	108
12	(Mexico) Lalo Laguna		5	2	8	12		3		6		7		6	**6**		4	10	4		4	5											108
13	(United States) Justin Matney		4	**1**	**2**	9	**6**		7	5		**3**		13						**6**	5	9											105
14	(United States) Craig Potts																								5	**8**	6	9	11		5	8	85
15	(United States) Scotty Steele																								10	6			12		4	3	69
16	(United States) Jeff Ward	3			10	8		6	6	12	3			8																			69
17	(Mexico) Apdaly Lopez																		5		3	4					3	3	10				51
18	(United States) Brock Heger																								4	5			8				47
19	(United States) Greg Foster																										8	8	6				41
20	(United States) Davey Hamilton																						7	3									38
21	(United States) Rino Navera																										4	7					32
22	(United States) Kyle LeDuc																													1		10	23
23	(United States) Townsend Bell																						4										18
24	(United States) Adrian Cenni							5	5	10		4		7																			16
25	(United States) Austin Kimbrell	5		4	12																												14
26	(Canada) Paul Tracy																						DNS	**7**									14
27	(United States) BJ Baldwin																												9				12
	(United States) Jessie Johnson														7		6	12															
	(United States) Keegan Kincaid																			2		7					2	4	5	5		9	

Legend
Color	Result
Gold	Winner
Silver	2nd place
Bronze	3rd place
Green	4th–5th place (Top 5)
Light Blue	6th–10th place (Top 10)
Dark Blue	Finished (Outside Top 10)
Purple	Did not finish (DNF)
Red	Did not qualify (DNQ)
Brown	Withdrew (Wth)
Black	Disqualified (DSQ)
White	Did not start (DNS)
White	Race cancelled or abandoned (C)
Blank	Did not participate (DNP)
Blank	Driver replacement (Rpl)
Blank	Race not held (NH)
Blank	Not competing

**In-line notation**
**Bold**	Pole position (1 point; except Indy)
Italics	Ran fastest race lap
^{L}	Led race lap (1 point)
*	Led most race laps (2 points)
^{1–12}	Indy 500 "Fast Twelve" bonus points
^{c}	Qualifying canceled (no bonus point)
RY	Rookie of the Year
R	Rookie

Points	Position														
Points	1st	2nd	3rd	4th	5th	6th	7th	8th	9th	10th	11th	12th	13th	14th	15th
Heat	12	10	8	7	5	4	3	2	1						
Final	25	22	20	18	16	15	14	13	12	11	10	9	8	7	6

Bonuses
Most laps led	3
Position gained	1
Fastest qualifier	1
