= Las Vegas Village =

Former outdoor performance venue

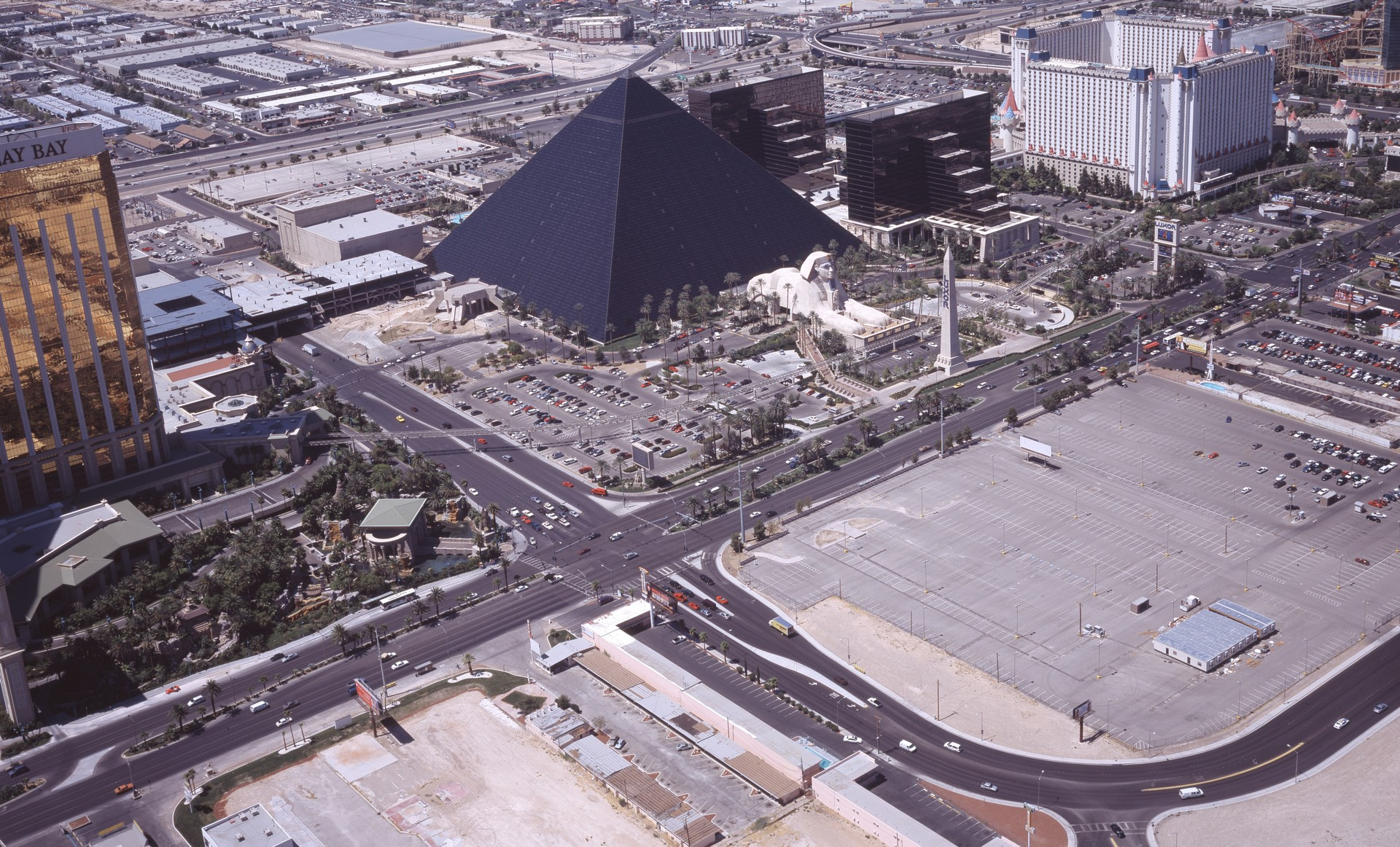
- The village property (bottom right) as a parking lot
- Interactive map of Las Vegas Village
- Former names: MGM Resorts Village (2013–2015)
- Address: 3901 South Las Vegas Boulevard; Paradise, Nevada
- Coordinates: 36.0956°N 115.1715°W
- Owner: MGM Resorts International
- Acreage: 15 acres (6.1 ha)

Construction
- Opened: 2013
- Closed: 2017
- Years active: 2013–2017

The Las Vegas Village was an open-air venue located on the Las Vegas Strip in Paradise, Nevada. Opened in 2013 as MGM Resorts Village, the venue was 15 acres (6.1 ha) and owned by MGM Resorts International.

The village was the site of the deadliest mass shooting in US history, which resulted in its closing. It has not been used since then.

== History ==
Located across the street from Luxor Las Vegas, the property was previously a parking lot owned by Mandalay Resort Group until MGM Resorts International purchased the company in 2004. The area became a concert venue and opened in 2013 as MGM Resorts Village, hosting the iHeartRadio Music Festival's Daytime Village—an outdoor counterpart to the main event—on September 20–21, 2013.

The village held the inaugural Route 91 Harvest music festival, a collaboration between MGM and Live Nation Entertainment, on October 3–5, 2014.

The Stadium Super Trucks racing series competed on the property in 2014 and 2015 as the final race weekends of each season; the first year was held in conjunction with SEMA and also featured other racing divisions like legends cars. Robby Gordon and Sheldon Creed won every race in both years.

On October 1, 2015, the venue's name was changed to Las Vegas Village to reduce MGM's influence on the site and its marketing potential.

During the 2017 Route 91 Harvest on October 1, Stephen Paddock fired on attendees in the village from the nearby Mandalay Bay Hotel, killing 60 people and injuring 867 others. The mass shooting, which was the deadliest in the United States by an individual, resulted in Route 91 being canceled for 2018 and subsequent years. The iHeartRadio Music Festival was relocated to the Las Vegas Festival Grounds.

The area was fenced off and remained vacant as MGM deliberated plans for the site's future. In 2019, MGM announced the village would be converted into parking space for Allegiant Stadium and a community center, but this plan was never implemented. Instead, in 2021, MGM donated 2 acres of the site to Clark County for a memorial site, and then sold the remainder in 2022 to a group of Native American tribes, the Mandan, Hidatsa, and Arikara Nation. As of January 2023, the MHA Nation has not yet announced its plans for the site, though it owns a casino on its reservation in North Dakota.

== See also ==
- Las Vegas Festival Grounds
