= AAX =

AAX may refer to:

- AirAsia X
- Araxá Airport in Minas Gerais, Brazil (IATA airport code AAX)
- AAX (Atom Asset Exchange)
- Audible Enhanced Audio format for audiobooks
- Avid Audio eXtension, a plugin format for Pro Tools software
- Mandobo language, a Papuan language of Indonesia

== See also ==
- AAXICO
- AA (disambiguation)
- AX (disambiguation)
- A2X (disambiguation)
