= 2019 Aussie Racing Car Series =

Motor racing competition

The 2019 Aussie Racing Car Series was an Australian motor racing series for Aussie Racing Cars.

== Entries ==
| Entrant | Body Style | No. | Driver Name | Class | Rounds |
|---|---|---|---|---|---|
| Aussie Racing Cars | Toyota Aurion | 2 | (Australia) Phil Ward | | 1 |
| Silkgate Group | Nissan Altima | 6 | (Australia) Ian Chavis | | 1 |
| Western Sydney Motorsport | Ford Mustang | 8 | (Australia) Justin Ruggier | | 1 |
| Western Sydney Motorsport | Ford Mustang | 52 | (Australia) Charlotte Poynting | | 1 |
| Western Sydney Motorsport | Ford Mustang | 64 | (Australia) Craig Woods | | 1 |
| Western Sydney Motorsport | Ford Mustang | 68 | (Australia) Blake Sieberras | | 1 |
| Western Sydney Motorsport | Ford Mustang | 72 | (Australia) Craig Thompson | | 1 |
| Western Sydney Motorsport | Ford Mustang | 78 | (Australia) Grant Thompson | | 1 |
| Supergroups Complex Constructions | Chevrolet Camaro | 11 | (Australia) Leigh Bowler | | 1 |
| CNW Electrical Wholesaler | Holden Cruze | 12 | (Australia) Daniel Price | | 1 |
| Lustre Bar Melbourne | Ford Mustang | 15 | (Australia) Adam Clark | | 1 |
| Lustre Bar Melbourne | Chevrolet Camaro | 51 | (Australia) Emma Clark | | 1 |
| Road Rage Industries | Chevrolet Camaro | 17 | (Australia) Peter Hurd | | 1 |
| Opteon Motorsport | Chevrolet Camaro | 23 | (Australia) Jonathan Bloxsom | | 1 |
| Castrol Racing | Chevrolet Camaro | 25 | (Australia) Reece Chapman | | 1 |
| Envirogen Racing | Toyota Aurion | 27 | (Australia) Troy Dontas | | 1 |
| RDA Brakes / Perenso | Chevrolet Camaro | 36 | (Australia) Joshua Anderson | | 1 |
| Heinrich Performance | Ford Coupe | 38 | (Australia) Glenn Boyd | | 1 |
| Kody Garland Racing | Nissan Altima | 41 | (Australia) Kody Garland | | 1 |
| PT Racing | Euro GT | 46 | (Australia) Pawel Faber | | 1 |
| Procool Racing | Chevrolet Camaro | 47 | (Australia) Troy Jones | | 1 |
| PZ Racing | Ford AU Falcon | 58 | (Australia) Jack Boyd | | 1 |
| Axil Coffee Roasters | Chevrolet Camaro | 65 | (Australia) David Makin | | 1 |
| KKP Racing | Chevrolet Camaro | 75 | (Australia) Kel Treseder | | 1 |
| Woods Racing | Chevrolet Camaro | 88 | (Australia) Brad Woods | | 1 |
| Aughtersons Insurance Brokers | Nissan Altima | 96 | (Australia) Jeff Watters | | 1 |
| Local Legends | Ford Mustang | 100 | (United Kingdom) Tony Quinn | | 1 |
| ACE Construction Group | Toyota Aurion | 111 | (Australia) Adam Casuccio | | 1 |

== Calendar ==
| Round | Circuit | Location | Dates |
|---|---|---|---|
| 1 | (South Australia) Adelaide Street Circuit | Adelaide, South Australia | 2–3 March |
| 2 | (Tasmania) Symmons Plains Raceway | Launceston, Tasmania | 6–7 April |
| 3 | (Northern Territory) Hidden Valley Raceway | Darwin, Northern Territory | 15–16 June |
| 4 | Queensland Raceway | Ipswich, Queensland | 27–28 July |
| 5 | (South Australia) The Bend Motorsport Park | Tailem Bend, South Australia | 24–25 August |
| 6 | (Queensland) Surfers Paradise Street Circuit | Surfers Paradise, Queensland | 26–27 October |
| 7 | (New South Wales) Newcastle Street Circuit | Newcastle, New South Wales | 23–24 November |

== Championship standings ==
| Pos. | Driver | Pts |
|---|---|---|
| 1 | Kel Treseder | 1649 |
| 2 | Justin Ruggier | 1639 |
| 3 | Joshua Anderson | 1557 |
| 4 | Leigh Bowler | 1528 |
| 5 | Blake Scibberas | 1473 |
| 6 | Reece Chapman | 1426 |
| 7 | Kody Garland | 1351 |
| 8 | Joel Heinrich | 1343 |
| 9 | Jonathan Bloxsom | 1325 |
| 10 | Adam Clark | 1305 |
| 11 | Craig Thompson | 1279 |
| 12 | Charlotte Poynting | 1268 |
| 13 | Jeff Watters | 1232 |
| 14 | Ian Chivas | 1140 |
| 15 | Grant Thompson | 882 |
| 16 | Troy Jones | 794 |
| 17 | Kent Quinn | 760 |
| 18 | Brad Woods | 691 |
| 19 | Craig Woods | 643 |
| 20 | Daniel Price | 556 |
| 21 | Tony Quinn | 543 |
| 22 | Troy Dontas | 487 |
| 23 | Pawel Faber | 481 |
| 24 | Kyle Honour | 438 |
| 25 | David Makin | 433 |
| 26 | Matt Nolan | 427 |
| 27 | Paul Morris | 424 |
| 28 | Emma Clark | 381 |
| 29 | Nick Simmons | 359 |
| 30 | Matt Forbes-Wilson | 290 |
| 31 | Sam Chester | 281 |
| 32 | Adam Übergang | 249 |
| 33 | Bryce Fullwood | 239 |
| 34 | Luke Fraser | 239 |
| 35 | Kyle Ensbey | 234 |
| 36 | Craig Dontas | 214 |
| 37 | Matthew McKittrick | 190 |
| 38 | Phil Ward | 185 |
| 39 | Luke van Herwaarde | 181 |
| 40 | Bruce Heinrich | 179 |
| 41 | Adam Casuccio | 175 |
| 42 | Jack Boyd | 167 |
| 43 | Glenn Boyd | 162 |
| 44 | Peter Herd | 159 |
| 45 | Kyle Clews | 147 |
| 46 | Mark Griffith | 142 |
| 47 | Mark Tarrant | 134 |
| 48 | Bill Hynes | 123 |
| 49 | Scott Taylor | 81 |
| 50 | Cody McKay | 72 |
| 51 | Oliver Shannon | 31 |
