= A5X =

A5X may refer to:

- Apple A5X system-on-a-chip
- Allwinner A5x processor family, an ARM based processor series
- A5X postal code; see List of postal codes of Canada: A

== See also ==
- AX-5 (disambiguation)
- AX (disambiguation)
