= ATX (disambiguation) =

ATX is a form factor for personal computer motherboards and power supplies.

ATX or AT-X may also refer to:

- AT-X (TV network), a Japanese broadcasting service
- Atbasar Airport, Kazakhstan
- atx (markup language), a lightweight markup language
- Austin, Texas, United States
- Austrian Traded Index, a stock market index of Austria
- Autotaxin, an enzyme
- Ford ATX transmission, an automobile component
- Atomoxetine, a noradrenergic medication
- Toyota Aurion AT-X, an automobile
- atX (gene), produces 6-Methylsalicylic acid in Aspergillus terreus

== See also ==
- A2X (disambiguation)
