= 2017 Aussie Racing Car Series =

Motor racing competition

The 2017 Aussie Racing Car Series is an Australian motor racing series. The category is made up of Silhouette racing cars which use Yamaha FJ1300 engines and Kumho Tyres. James Duckworth is the defending champion.

== Teams and drivers ==
| Team | Body | No. | Driver | Rounds |
|---|---|---|---|---|
| RDA Brakes / Rinkin Racing | Nissan Altima | 1 | (Australia) James Duckworth | 1 |
| RDA Brakes / Rinkin Racing | Chevrolet Camaro | 1 | (Australia) James Duckworth | 2–4 |
| Dr Ink Tattoo Removal | Ford Mustang | 2 | (Australia) Ben Walsh | 1–2 |
| Dr Ink Tattoo Removal | Ford Mustang | 2 | (Australia) Travis Sharpe | 3 |
| Townsville Auto Group | Nissan Altima | 3 | (Australia) Madison Dunston | 1 |
| Townsville Auto Group | Toyota Aurion | 3 | (Australia) Madison Dunston | 2, 4 |
| Variety Group | Chevrolet Camaro | 4 | (Australia) Brendon Tucker | 1–4 |
| Pitstop Karting | Holden Commodore | 5 | (Australia) Dale Dunston | 4 |
| Silkate Group | Nissan Altima | 6 | (Australia) Ian Chivas | 2–4 |
| Dutton Motor Sport | Chevrolet Camaro | 8 | (Australia) Cobi Rontaunay | 1, 4 |
| Ruthie Racer Racing | Ford Coupe | 9 | (Australia) Ruth Bowler | 1–3 |
| Advantage Motorsport | Chevrolet Camaro | 11 | (Australia) Leigh Bowler | 1–4 |
| Colac Windscreens | Chevrolet Camaro | 13 | (Australia) Ross Higgins | 1–2 |
| Lustre Bar Melbourne | Nissan Altima | 15 | (Australia) Emma Clark | 1–4 |
| Financial Destiny Racing | Holden Commodore | 23 | (Australia) Todd O'Brien | 1 |
| Motorsport 25 | Chevrolet Camaro | 25 | (Australia) Reece Chapman | 1–4 |
| Oknalux Window and Doors | Toyota Aurion | 26 | (Australia) Layton Barker | 1 |
| Axil Coffee Rosters | Toyota Aurion | 26 | (Australia) David Makin | 4 |
| Motorcare Auto Solutions | Toyota Aurion | 27 | (Australia) Sam Milton | 1 |
| Barbouts Racing | Nissan Altima | 34 | (Australia) Alexander Barbouts | 3 |
| Perenso | Chevrolet Camaro | 36 | (Australia) Darren Chamberlin | 2 |
| Perenso | Chevrolet Camaro | 36 | (Australia) Joshua Anderson | 4 |
| Fraser Racing | Nissan Altima | 39 | (Australia) Luke Fraser | 1 |
| Sean Rose Motorsport | Holden Cruze | 39 | (Australia) Joel Heinrich | 2 |
| Sean Rose Motorsport | Chevrolet Camaro | 56 | (Australia) Sean Rose | 1–2 |
| Fleurieu Milk Company | Holden Cruze | 40 | (Australia) Troy Dontas | 1 |
| Ross Haven Marine Racing | Ford Mustang | 40 | (Australia) Troy Dontas | 4 |
| Charlotte Poynting Racing | Chevrolet Camaro | 52 | (Australia) Charlotte Poynting | 1–3 |
| Hynes Racing | Nissan Altima | 57 | (United States) Bill Hynes | 3 |
| Hynes Racing | Nissan Altima | 57 | (United States) Robby Gordon | 11 |
| Hynes Racing | Nissan Altima | 57 | (United States) Sheldon Creed | 12 |
| PZ Racing | Ford Falcon | 58 | (Australia) Glenn Boyd | 1 |
| Erina Fair Medical Centre | Ford Mustang | 61 | (Australia) Peter Carr | 4 |
| Uebergang Transport | Chevrolet Camaro | 63 | (Australia) Adam Uebergang | 1 |
| Western Sydney Motorsport | Ford Mustang | 64 | (Australia) Craig Woods | 1–4 |
| Western Sydney Motorsport | Ford Mustang | 68 | (Australia) Blake Sciberras | 1–4 |
| Western Sydney Motorsport | Ford Mustang | 72 | (Australia) Craig Thompson | 1–3 |
| Western Sydney Motorsport | Ford Mustang | 78 | (Australia) Grant Thompson | 1–3 |
| Nissan Financial Services | Chevrolet Camaro | 71 | (Australia) Michael Rinkin | 1–3 |
| KKP Motorsport | Chevrolet Camaro | 75 | (Australia) Kel Treseder | 1–4 |
| Spray Booth Services Australia | Holden Commodore | 77 | (Australia) Sam Chester | 1–3 |
| Hertz | Chevrolet Camaro | 88 | (Australia) Chris Stevenson | 1–4 |
| Cure for MND Foundation | Nissan Altima | 96 | (Australia) Jeff Watters | 1–3 |
| National Fire and Safety | Chevrolet Camaro | 98 | (Australia) Jaie Robson | 1–4 |
| Aussie Racing Cars | Ford Mustang | 100 | (Australia) Kent Quinn | 3 |
| ACE Construction Group | Toyota Aurion | 111 | (Australia) Adam Casuccio | 1 |
| Multi Services Solutions | Nissan Altima | 222 | (Australia) Scott O'Keefe | 1 |

== Race calendar ==
The series was contested over seven rounds with four races at each round.

| Round | | Circuit | City / State | Date | Pole position | Fastest lap | Winning driver | Winning team |
|---|---|---|---|---|---|---|---|---|
| 1 | R1 | (South Australia) Adelaide Street Circuit | Adelaide, South Australia | 2 March | (Australia) Kel Treseder | (Australia) Kel Treseder | (Australia) James Duckworth | RDA Brakes / Rinkin Racing |
| 1 | R2 | (South Australia) Adelaide Street Circuit | Adelaide, South Australia | 3 March | | (Australia) Ben Walsh | (Australia) Craig Woods | Western Sydney Motorsport |
| 1 | R3 | (South Australia) Adelaide Street Circuit | Adelaide, South Australia | 4 March | | (Australia) Kel Treseder | (Australia) Kel Treseder | KKP Motorsport |
| 1 | R4 | (South Australia) Adelaide Street Circuit | Adelaide, South Australia | 5 March | | (Australia) Kel Treseder | (Australia) James Duckworth | RDA Brakes / Rinkin Racing |
| 2 | R1 | (Tasmania) Symmons Plains Raceway | Launceston, Tasmania | 7–9 April | (Australia) Kel Treseder | | | |
| 2 | R2 | (Tasmania) Symmons Plains Raceway | Launceston, Tasmania | 7–9 April | | | | |
| 2 | R3 | (Tasmania) Symmons Plains Raceway | Launceston, Tasmania | 7–9 April | | | | |
| 2 | R4 | (Tasmania) Symmons Plains Raceway | Launceston, Tasmania | 7–9 April | | | | |
| 3 | R1 | (Western Australia) Barbagallo Raceway | Perth, Western Australia | 5–7 May | (Australia) James Duckworth | | | |
| 3 | R2 | (Western Australia) Barbagallo Raceway | Perth, Western Australia | 5–7 May | | | | |
| 3 | R3 | (Western Australia) Barbagallo Raceway | Perth, Western Australia | 5–7 May | | | | |
| 3 | R4 | (Western Australia) Barbagallo Raceway | Perth, Western Australia | 5–7 May | | | | |
| 4 | R1 | (Queensland) Townsville Street Circuit | Townsville, Queensland | 7–9 July | | | | |
| 4 | R2 | (Queensland) Townsville Street Circuit | Townsville, Queensland | 7–9 July | | | | |
| 4 | R3 | (Queensland) Townsville Street Circuit | Townsville, Queensland | 7–9 July | | | | |
| 4 | R4 | (Queensland) Townsville Street Circuit | Townsville, Queensland | 7–9 July | | | | |
| 5 | R1 | (New South Wales) Sydney Motorsport Park | Eastern Creek, New South Wales | 18–20 August | | | | |
| 5 | R2 | (New South Wales) Sydney Motorsport Park | Eastern Creek, New South Wales | 18–20 August | | | | |
| 5 | R3 | (New South Wales) Sydney Motorsport Park | Eastern Creek, New South Wales | 18–20 August | | | | |
| 5 | R4 | (New South Wales) Sydney Motorsport Park | Eastern Creek, New South Wales | 18–20 August | | | | |
| 6 | R1 | (Queensland) Surfers Paradise Street Circuit | Gold Coast, Queensland | 20–22 October | | | | |
| 6 | R2 | (Queensland) Surfers Paradise Street Circuit | Gold Coast, Queensland | 20–22 October | | | | |
| 6 | R3 | (Queensland) Surfers Paradise Street Circuit | Gold Coast, Queensland | 20–22 October | | | | |
| 6 | R4 | (Queensland) Surfers Paradise Street Circuit | Gold Coast, Queensland | 20–22 October | | | | |
| 7 | R1 | (New South Wales) Newcastle Street Circuit | Newcastle, New South Wales | 24–26 November | | | | |
| 7 | R2 | (New South Wales) Newcastle Street Circuit | Newcastle, New South Wales | 24–26 November | | | | |
| 7 | R3 | (New South Wales) Newcastle Street Circuit | Newcastle, New South Wales | 24–26 November | | | | |
| 7 | R4 | (New South Wales) Newcastle Street Circuit | Newcastle, New South Wales | 24–26 November | | | | |

== Series standings ==
| Pos. | Driver | ADE (South Australia) | | | | SYM (Tasmania) | BAR (Western Australia) | TOW (Queensland) | SMP (New South Wales) | SUR (Queensland) | NEW (New South Wales) | Pts. |
|---|---|---|---|---|---|---|---|---|---|---|---|---|
| 1 | James Duckworth | 1 | 2 | 6 | 1 | | | | | | | 249 |
| 2 | Craig Woods | 2 | 1 | 5 | 5 | | | | | | | 242 |
| 3 | Blake Sciberras | 6 | 3 | 4 | 3 | | | | | | | 241 |
| 4 | Luke Fraser | 7 | 11 | 3 | 2 | | | | | | | 235 |
| 5 | Brendon Tucker | 4 | 7 | 12 | 8 | | | | | | | 221 |
| 6 | Chris Stevenson | 8 | 6 | 11 | 7 | | | | | | | 221 |
| 7 | Adam Casuccio | 5 | 9 | 10 | 11 | | | | | | | 214 |
| 8 | Jeff Watters | 10 | 10 | 13 | 10 | | | | | | | 207 |
| 9 | Kel Treseder | 25 | 4 | 1 | 12 | | | | | | | 206 |
| 10 | Reece Chapman | 13 | 12 | 7 | 15 | | | | | | | 198 |
| 11 | Sam Milton | 9 | Ret | 15 | 9 | | | | | | | 189 |
| 12 | Jaie Robson | 27 | Ret | 8 | 4 | | | | | | | 187 |
| 13 | Charlotte Poynting | 12 | 16 | 17 | 14 | | | | | | | 187 |
| 14 | Adam Uebergang | Ret | 27 | 9 | 6 | | | | | | | 182 |
| 15 | Scott O'Keefe | 14 | 13 | 16 | 18 | | | | | | | 181 |
| 16 | Cobi Rotaunay | 3 | 8 | 14 | Ret | | | | | | | 175 |
| 17 | Craig Thompson | Ret | 14 | 18 | 13 | | | | | | | 174 |
| 18 | Michael Rinkin | 11 | 19 | 19 | 20 | | | | | | | 171 |
| 19 | Ben Walsh | 26 | 5 | 2 | 29 | | | | | | | 169 |
| 20 | Leigh Bowler | 15 | 15 | Ret | 16 | | | | | | | 167 |
| 21 | Sam Chester | 17 | 23 | 20 | 17 | | | | | | | 166 |
| 22 | Glenn Boyd | 16 | 18 | 23 | 23 | | | | | | | 157 |
| 23 | Emma Clark | 20 | 20 | 22 | 21 | | | | | | | 156 |
| 24 | Bill Hynes | 18 | 17 | 24 | 25 | | | | | | | 151 |
| 25 | Ross Higgins | 23 | 22 | 27 | 22 | | | | | | | 144 |
| 26 | Ruth Bowler | 21 | 21 | 29 | 24 | | | | | | | 141 |
| 27 | Grant Thompson | Ret | Ret | 25 | 19 | | | | | | | 137 |
| 28 | Madison Dunston | 19 | Ret | 26 | 26 | | | | | | | 128 |
| 29 | Layton Barker | 24 | 26 | 28 | 27 | | | | | | | 128 |
| 30 | Todd O'Brien | 22 | 25 | 30 | 28 | | | | | | | 127 |
| 31 | Troy Dontas | Ret | 24 | 21 | Ret | | | | | | | 122 |

== Notes ==
- The top 3 finisher of Race 1 of Round 1 at the Adelaide Street Circuit (Kel Treseder, Ben Walsh, Jaie Robson) were each awarded 28 seconds time penalties for indiscretions behind the safety car and therefore finished 25th-27th respectively. James Duckworth was awarded the win.
- James Duckworth, Brendon Tucker and Sam Chester were each awarded 5 seconds penalties in Race 2 of Round 1. Duckworth's position went unchanged whilst Tucker and Chester fell from 6th to 7th and 22nd to 23rd respectively.
- Kel Treseder was awarded a 22 seconds penalty in Race 4 of Round 1 for contact with Craig Woods. He fell from 1st to 12th giving James Duckworth the win.
- Kel Treseder set a new lap record for Aussie Racing Cars at the Adelaide Street Circuit during Race 3 beating Paul Kemal record set in 2006 in a Ford Falcon. He later broke his own record in Race 4.
