= A20 =

A20, A 20, A.20 or A-20 may refer to:

== Vehicles ==
- A-20 Havoc, a U.S.-designed attack aircraft used in World War II
- A20 heavy tank, a British tank which did not enter production but of which a downsized version became the A22 Churchill tank
- A-20 tank, one of the prototypes of Soviet T-34 tank
- Aero A.20, a Czech fighter plane
- Arrows A20, a race car
- Fiat A.20, an engine powering the 1925 Italian Ansaldo A.120 aircraft
- Focke-Wulf A 20, a 1927 German airliner
- JAC Heyue A20, a subcompact car
- Junkers A 20, a predecessor of the Junkers A 35 aircraft

== Other uses ==
- A20 cell line, a cell line
- A20 line, an address line on the system bus of x86 processors
- University of Aberdeen (UCAS institution code)
- British NVC community A20 (Ranunculus peltatus community), a plant community
- Dance Dance Revolution A20, the latest version of Konami's arcade rhythm game series
- English Opening (Encyclopedia of chess openings code)
- List of A20 roads
- Oshiage Station (station code), a train station in Sumida, Tokyo, Japan
- Samsung Galaxy A20, smartphone released in 2019
- TNFAIP3 or A20, a zinc finger protein that inhibits NF-kappa B activation
- Alternative 2020, a political party in Suriname
- A-20, a character in the Japanese .hack//Sign anime, whose voice is given by Atsuko Enomoto
- Apple A20 Pro, a mobile processor produced by Apple

== See also ==
- AXX (disambiguation)
- A2O, or Alps to Ocean, a cycleway in New Zealand
