= AXX =

AXX may refer to:

- the ticker symbol of the Axia NetMedia company
- Axx, a group of Toyota transmissions
- the ISO 639-3 code of the Xârâgurè language
- Angel Fire Airport, in Angel Fire, New Mexico (Federal Aviation Administration Location Identifier)
- F/A-XX program (a.k.a. A-XX), a 21st-century U.S. Navy project to replace the F/A-18E/F
- Sound BlasterAxx, the AXX line of computer speakers sold under the brand name Sound Blaster from Creative Labs

== See also ==
- AX (disambiguation)
- A20 (disambiguation)
- A2X (disambiguation)
- AX-2 (disambiguation)
