= AX-5 =

AX-5 or AX5 may refer to:

- AX-5: Orion (videogame), a 1982 game; see List of Project EGG games
- Axiom Mission 5, future spaceflight
- Aeolus AX5 compact crossover utility vehicle
- Aisin AX5 automotive transmission; see List of Aisin transmissions
- Fujica AX-5 camera
- NASA Ames AX-5 Mars suit spacesuit
- UGM-27 Polaris AX-5 test mission

== See also ==
- A5X (disambiguation)
- AX (disambiguation)
