= AX-2 =

AX-2 may refer to:

- Axiom Mission 2 (Ax-2), a 2023 commercial crewed paying passenger spaceflight mission
- FMA IA 58 "Pucará", Argentinian ground attack fighter, codenamed "AX-2" during development
- AX-2: Dual Alien, a 1982 videogame; see List of Project EGG games

== See also ==
- AXX (disambiguation)
- A2X (disambiguation)
- AX (disambiguation)
