= Aussie Racing Cars =

Australian auto racing category

- Category: Silhouette racing car
- Country: Australia
- Inaugural season: 2001
- Engine suppliers: Yamaha FJR1300 (2001–2025); Yamaha MT-09 (2026–present)
- Tyre suppliers: Kumho Tires
- Drivers' champion: Kody Garland
- Official website: Official website of Aussie Racing Cars

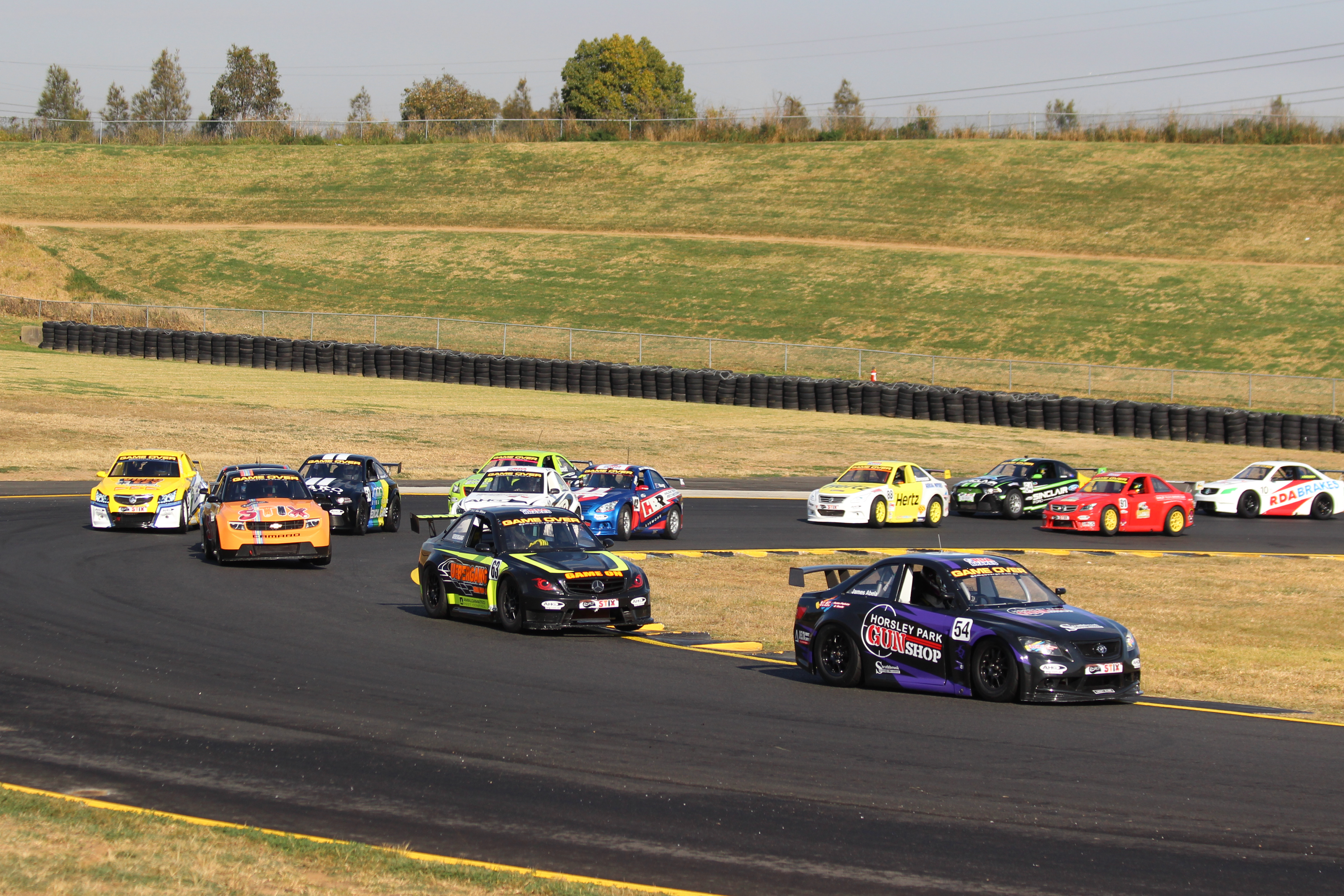
The first lap of an Aussie Racing Cars race at Sydney Motorsport Park in 2015

Aussie Racing Cars (ARC), currently known as the Battery World Aussie Racing Cars under sponsorship, is an Australian auto racing category. ARC is a motorcycle powered silhouette racing car class created by former touring car racing driver Phil Ward and influenced by the American Legends category. Aussie Racing Cars was developed as a Major National Category supporting the V8 Supercars under an exclusive Category Management Agreement (CMA) with the Confederation of Australian Motorsport (CAMS).

== History ==
Initially, the cars were based on caricatures of 1940 Ford Coupe and 1953 FJ Holden body styles. In 2007, a new era of Aussie Race Car emerged with the design and launch of the Toyota Aurion bodied Aussie Race Car. This new car extended the wheelbase and track on the first generation cars improving performance significantly. Respected design engineer Russell Mapplebeck led the engineering project alongside James Ward and Blake Hammond. The process to design and build the first "New Age" Aussie Race Car paved the way for future body models, also designed by Mapplebeck, based on the Mercedes-Benz, Holden Cruze, and later the Chevrolet Camaro and Ford Mustang.

The category contests an annual Aussie Racing Car Series which is approved by the Confederation of Australian Motor Sport as a National Series. Over its 20-year history the category has supported the biggest motorsports events in Australia including the Adelaide 500, Gold Coast Indy 300, F1 Australian Grand Prix and Bathurst 1000.

The Hampton Downs round of the 2016 season hosted the inaugural Trans-Tasman Women's Challenge. Charlotte Poynting was chosen to represent Team Australian, and was up against Alyssa Clapperton of Team New Zealand. In Race 3 Poynting, who started 9th on the grid, raced through the field to win by 2.5 seconds, becoming the first ever woman to win a race in the Aussie Racing Cars category.

== Cars ==
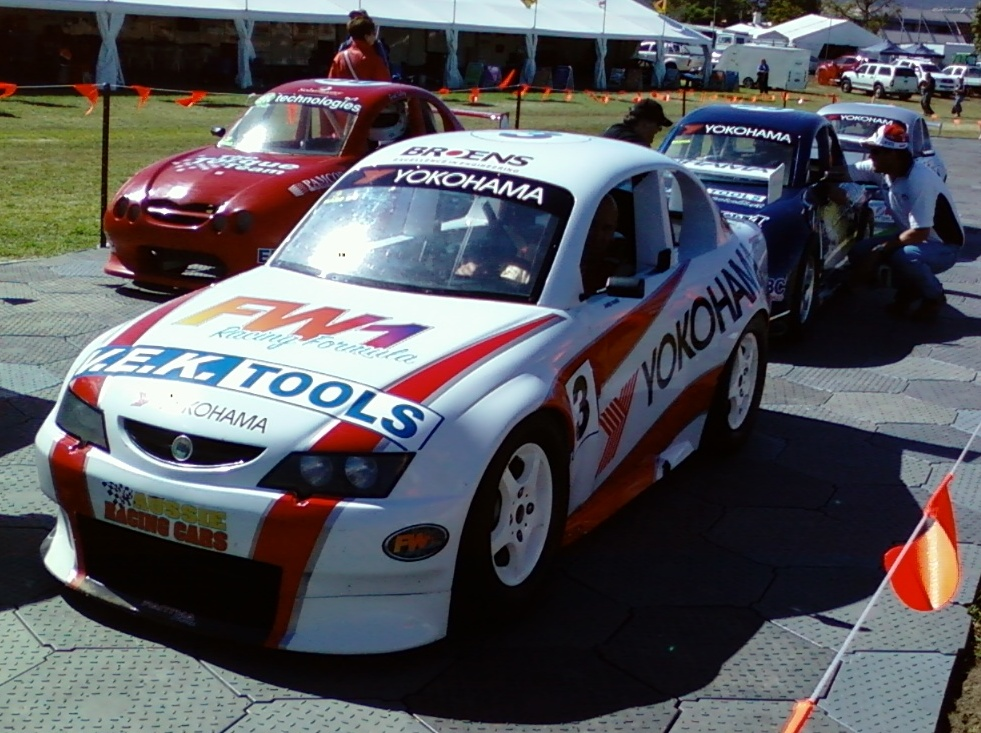
A Holden VY Commodore-bodied Aussie Racing Car.

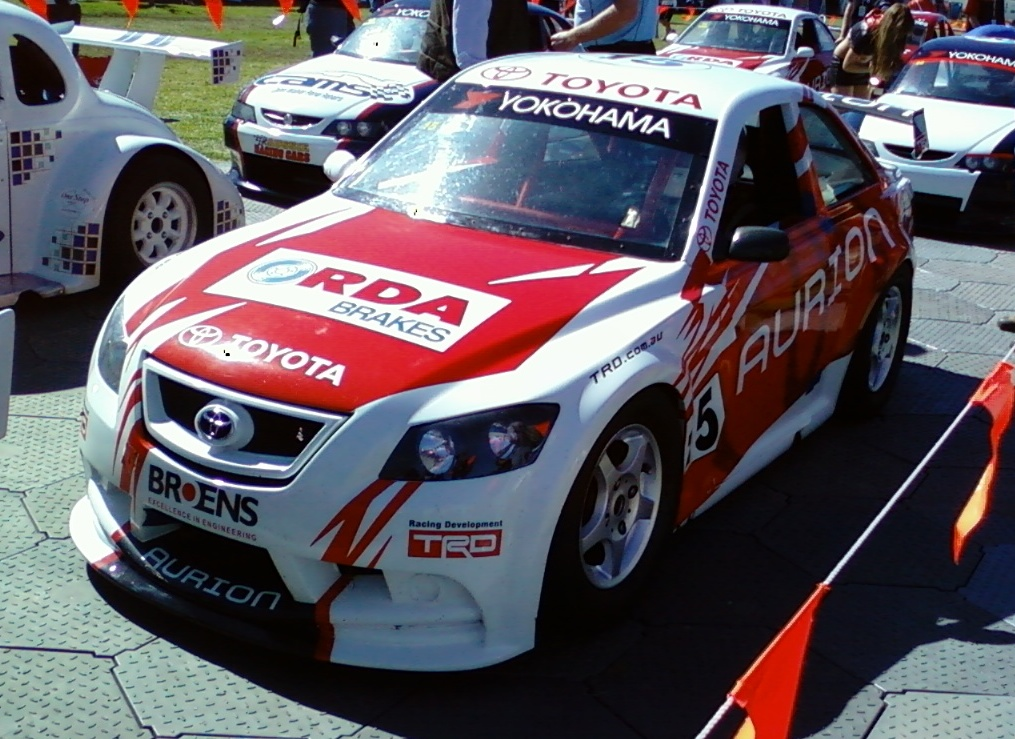
A Toyota Aurion-bodied Aussie Racing Car.

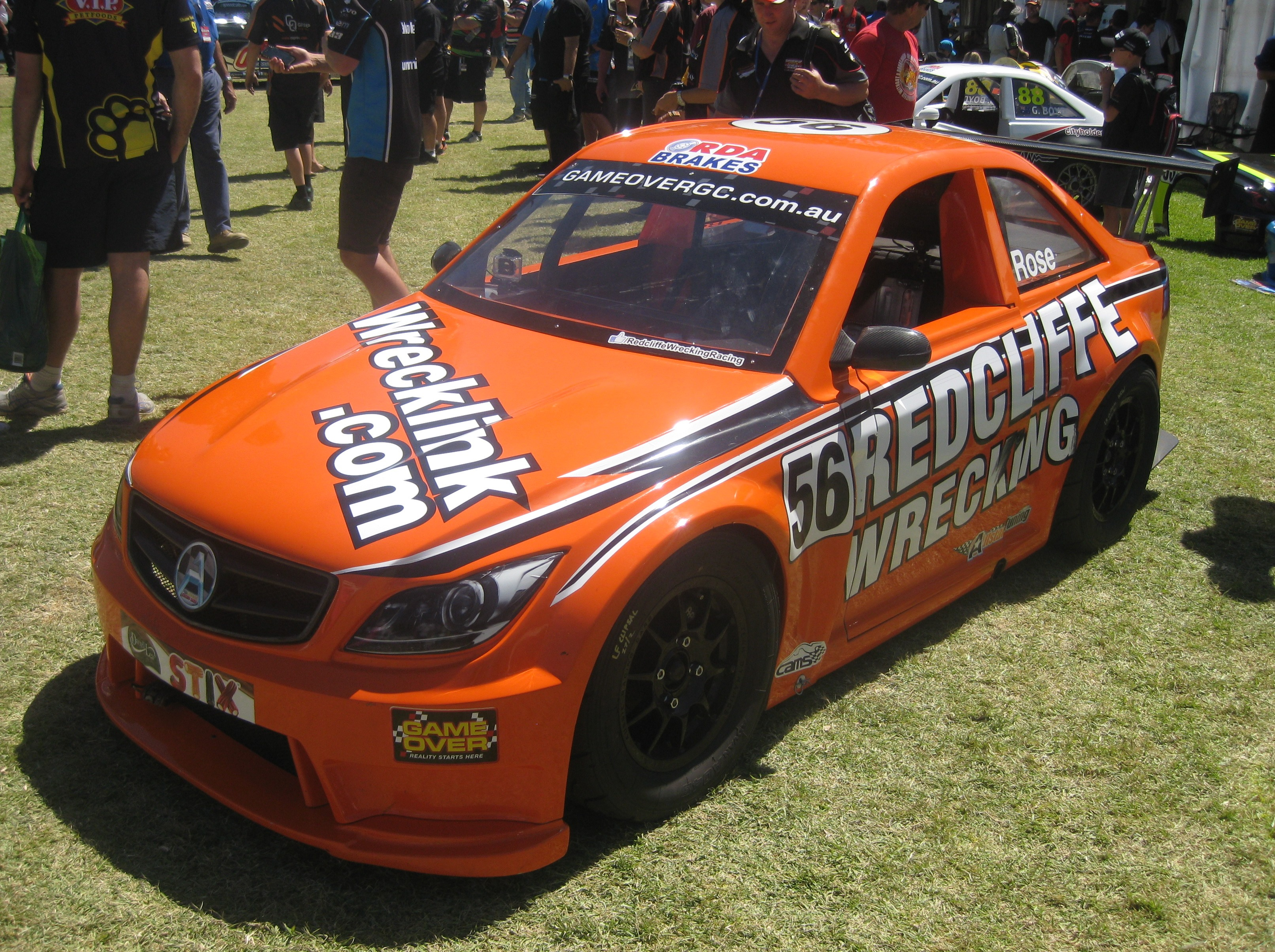
A "Euro GT"-bodied Aussie Racing Car.

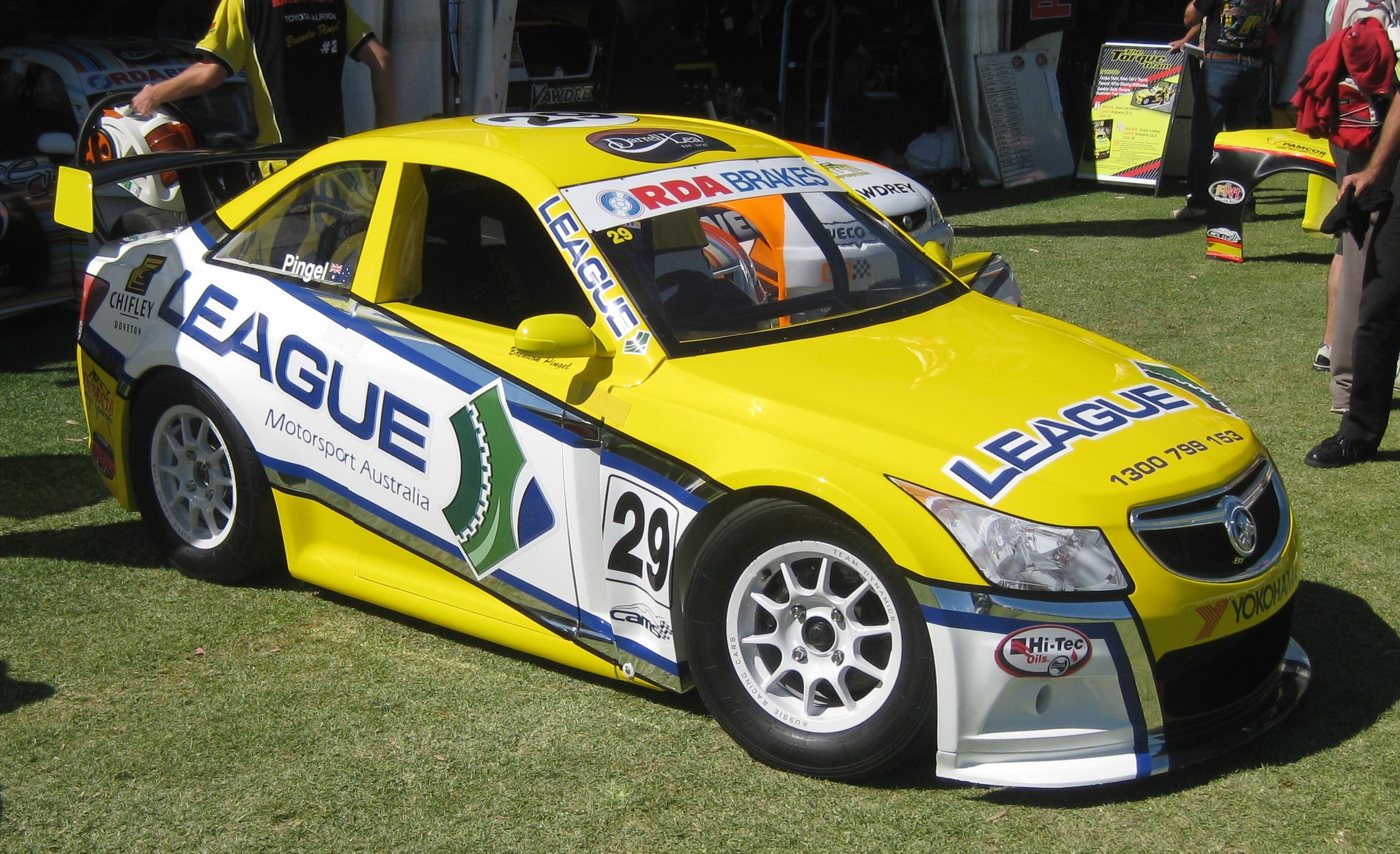
A Holden Cruze-bodied Aussie Racing Car.

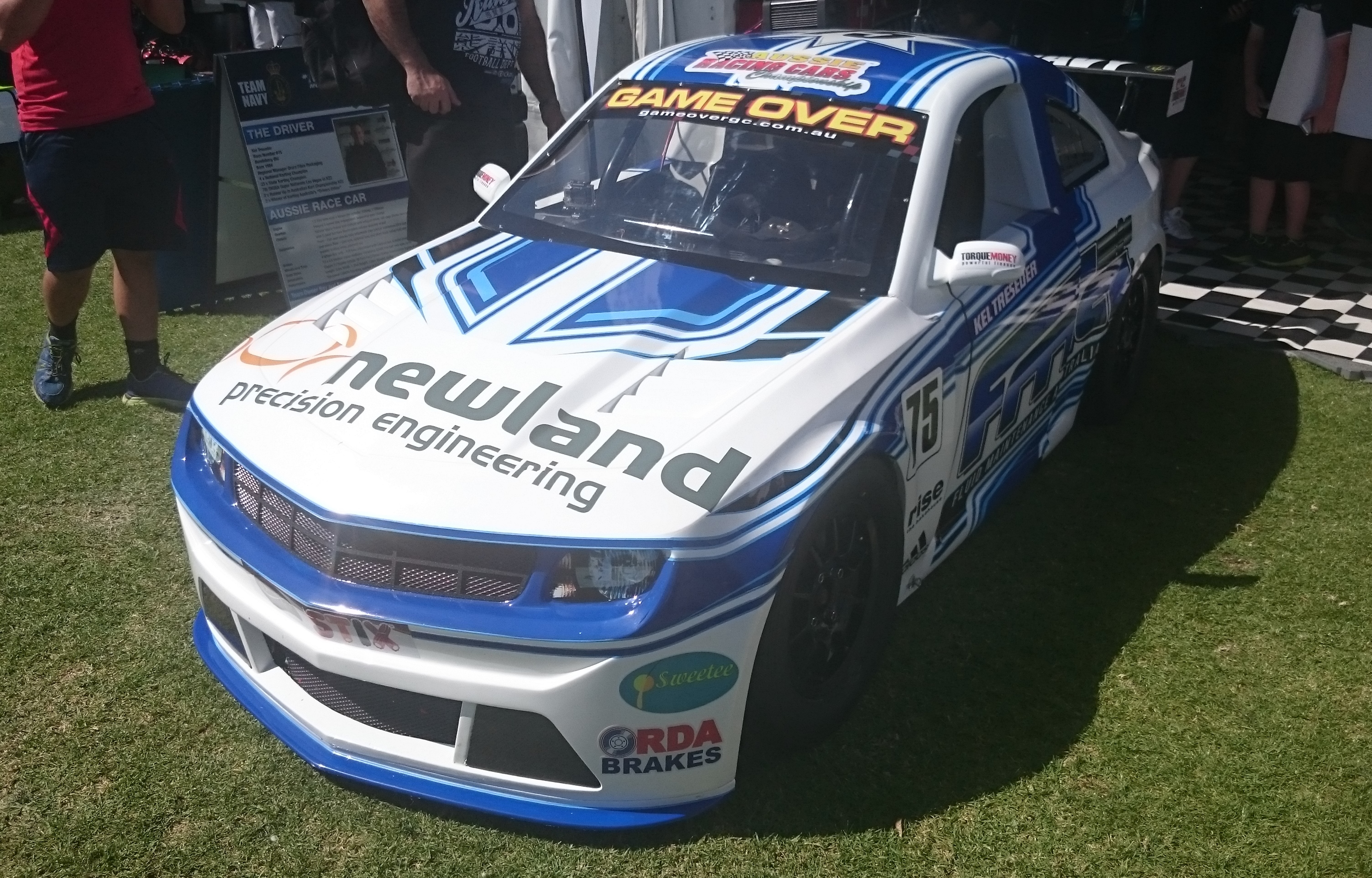
A Chevrolet Camaro-bodied Aussie Racing Car.

The Aussie Racing Car combines current racing technology and performance in a one-design class where all cars are mechanically identical with strict rules in place to maintain that position. Various body styles are permitted. Originally only 1940 Ford Coupé and Holden FJ body styles were available, with Ford AU Falcon and Holden VY Commodore styles, which replicate V8 Supercars, later made available. A Toyota Aurion body shape was launched in 2008, followed by a Holden Cruze in 2012 and a Mercedes-Benz inspired "Euro GT" in 2013. Nissan Altima, Ford Mustang, and Chevrolet Camaro were added in 2014. Hyundai Elantra debuted during the 2015 series.

Cars are constructed on a purpose-built steel tubular space frame chassis with integral roll cage construction designed and approved to stringent engineering specifications. The lightweight composite body is a designed caricature of its full-size counterpart featuring opening doors, boot and lift off front section. Powered by a 1.3L 125 bhp (93 kW) twin cam 16 valve engine sourced second-hand from used Yamaha FJR1300 motorcycles that revs to 11500 rpm. The 515 kg all up weight provides a high power-to-weight ratio that allows the car to reach speeds in excess of 200 km/h. Beginning in the 2026 season, the category began the phasing out the aging 1300CC engine in favour of the 890CC Yamaha MT-09 engine, for the benefit of greater spare parts availability, but with the trade-off of lower power output. Lap times achieved at Oran Park Raceway are within six seconds of a V8 Supercar. They feature fully adjustable suspension geometry, performance brakes and controlled competition tyres that produce high grip levels. All cars are hand built in the ARC facility and supplied ready to race.

The cockpit layout is purpose built and fitted with a five-point racing harness. The steering requires only one turn lock-to-lock and minimal steering movement during racing. The sequential gear lever is close to the steering wheel and the carbon fibre dash displays the necessary instrumentation. The chassis design incorporates simplicity in suspension adjustment to cater for all drivers' preferences including castor/camber, sway bar, roll centre and ride height etc. Brakes have front to rear bias adjustment.

== Series winners ==
Year	Champion	Body style/Body styles
2001	Paul Kemal	1940 Ford Coupé
2002	Mike Russell	1953 Holden FJ
2003	Mike Russell	1953 Holden FJ
2004	James Ward	Ford AU Falcon
2005	Tim Monte	Ford AU Falcon
2006	Paul Kemal	Ford AU Falcon
2007	Brad Ward	Holden VY Commodore
2008	Paul Kemal	Ford AU Falcon
2009	Adam Gowans	Toyota Aurion
2010	Kyle Clews	Holden VY Commodore
2011	Adrian Cottrell	Toyota Aurion
2012	Kyle Clews	Holden VY Commodore
2013	Maurice Masini	Ford AU Falcon
2014	Darren Chamberlin	Toyota Aurion
2015	Brendon Pingel	Holden Cruze
2016	James Duckworth	Nissan Altima
2017	James Duckworth	Chevrolet Camaro
2018	Joel Heinrich	Nissan Altima, Holden Cruze, Chevrolet Camaro
2019	Justin Ruggier	Ford Mustang
2020	Josh Anderson	Chevrolet Camaro
2021	Kody Garland	Ford Mustang
2022	Joshua Anderson	Ford Mustang
2023	Joel Heinrich	Ford Mustang
2024	Joel Heinrich	Ford Mustang
2025	Kody Garland	Ford Mustang
2026		

- Italics: 2020 and 2021 are unofficial, as no official championship was awarded because of an insufficient number of rounds held because of pandemic restrictions. Only the Bathurst 12 Hour round of three races was held in 2020, and only three of a planned six rounds (nine races conducted) were held in 2021. Drivers listed led points at curtailment of seasons.

== Circuits ==
- (South Australia) Adelaide Street Circuit (2004–2007, 2009–2014, 2016–2017, 2019, 2025)
- (Victoria (state)) Albert Park Circuit (2007–2009)
- (Tasmania) Baskerville Raceway (2006, 2018)
- (New Zealand) Hampton Downs Motorsport Park (2016)
- (Northern Territory) Hidden Valley Raceway (2006, 2010, 2015–2016, 2019, 2023)
- (New Zealand) Highlands Motorsport Park (2015, 2023)
- (New South Wales) Homebush Street Circuit (2009, 2011, 2013, 2015)
- (Queensland) Morgan Park Raceway (2010)
- (New South Wales) Mount Panorama Circuit (2006–2007, 2011–2012, 2014–2015, 2020–2022, 2024, 2026)
- (New South Wales) Newcastle Street Circuit (2017, 2019, 2023)
- (New South Wales) One Raceway (2003, 2005, 2008, 2022)
- (New South Wales) Oran Park Raceway (2001–2009)
- (Victoria (state)) Phillip Island Grand Prix Circuit (2010–2012, 2014–2016, 2018, 2024)
- Queensland Raceway (2002–2005, 2010–2011, 2013–2014, 2016, 2018–2019, 2023–2024, 2026)
- (Queensland) Reid Park Street Circuit (2012, 2017, 2023–2024, 2026)
- (Victoria (state)) Sandown Raceway (2003–2007, 2022, 2025)
- (Queensland) Surfers Paradise Street Circuit (2005–2009, 2012–2014, 2017–2019, 2024–present)
- (New South Wales) Sydney Motorsport Park (2003–2005, 2007–2010, 2012, 2015–2018, 2021–2022, 2025)
- (Tasmania) Symmons Plains Raceway (2005, 2008, 2011, 2013–2015, 2017, 2019, 2021–present)
- (South Australia) The Bend Motorsport Park (2018–2019, 2022, 2025–present)
- (Western Australia) Wanneroo Raceway (2014, 2017, 2024–2025)
- (Victoria (state)) Winton Motor Raceway (2001–2004, 2008–2009, 2011, 2013, 2018, 2022)
