= 2018 Aussie Racing Car Series =

Motor racing series

The 2018 Aussie Racing Car Series was an Australian motor racing series open to Aussie Racing Cars, which are silhouette racing cars which use Yamaha FJ1300 engines and Kumho Tyres. It was sanctioned by the Confederation of Australian Motor Sport (CAMS) as an Authorised Series with the Series and Category owner, Aussie Racing Cars Pty Ltd, appointed by CAMS as the Category Manager. The series commenced at Baskerville Raceway in Tasmania on 23 February and concluded on 21 October at the Surfers Paradise Street Circuit. James Duckworth was the defending series winner heading into the 2018 series, but opted not to defend his title.

The series was won by Joel Heinrich.

== Teams and drivers ==
The following teams and drivers competed in the series.

| Team | Body style | No | Driver | Rounds |
|---|---|---|---|---|
| Western Sydney Motorsport | Toyota Aurion (XV40) | 2 | (Australia) Adam Gowans | 1 |
| Western Sydney Motorsport | Toyota Aurion (XV40) | 2 | (Australia) Troy Dontas | 2 |
| Western Sydney Motorsport | Nissan Altima (L33) | 2 | (Australia) Bruce Heinrich | 3, 5 |
| Western Sydney Motorsport | Ford Mustang (S-197) | 8 | (Australia) Justin Ruggier | 1–5 |
| Western Sydney Motorsport | Ford Mustang (S-197) | 27 | (Australia) Troy Dontas | 3 |
| Western Sydney Motorsport | Ford Mustang (S-197) | 29 | (Australia) Grant Thompson | 1–5 |
| Western Sydney Motorsport | Ford Mustang (S-197) | 52 | (Australia) Charlotte Poynting | 1–5 |
| Western Sydney Motorsport | Ford Mustang (S-197) | 68 | (Australia) Blake Sciberas | 1–5 |
| Western Sydney Motorsport | Ford Mustang (S-197) | 72 | (Australia) Craig Thompson | 1–5 |
| McDonald's Restaurants | Chevrolet Camaro | 3 | (Australia) Madison Dunston | 1–5 |
| Variety Group | Chevrolet Camaro | 4 | (Australia) Brendon Tucker | 1–5 |
| Pitstop Karting | Holden Commodore (VY) | 5 | (Australia) Keelan Dunston | 2 |
| Silkgate Group | Nissan Altima (L33) | 6 | (Australia) Ian Chivas | 2, 4 |
| Peter Herd Motorsport | Chevrolet Camaro | 7 | (Australia) Peter Herd | 3 |
| Ruthie Racer Racing | 1937 Ford | 9 | (Australia) Ruth Bowler | 1 |
| Supergroups Conplex Construction | Chevrolet Camaro | 11 | (Australia) Leigh Bowler | 2–4 |
| Supergroups Conplex Construction | Nissan Altima (L33) | 56 | (Australia) Leigh Bowler | 1 |
| Cumberland River Holiday Park | Chevrolet Camaro | 13 | (Australia) Ross Higgins | 2 |
| Lustre Bar Melbourne | Nissan Altima (L33) | 15 | (Australia) Adam Clark | 1–2 |
| Lustre Bar Melbourne | Chevrolet Camaro | 15 | (Australia) Emma Clark | 3–4 |
| Lustre Bar Melbourne | Chevrolet Camaro | 51 | (Australia) Emma Clark | 2 |
| Osborns Transport | Nissan Altima (L33); Holden Cruze; Chevrolet Camaro | 16 | (Australia) Joel Heinrich | 1–4 |
| Redcliffe Wrecking | Chevrolet Camaro | 17 | (Australia) Ben Tomlin | 4 |
| Automotive Warehouse | Toyota Aurion (XV40) | 19 | (Australia) Sheridan Phillips | 3 |
| Kyle Ensbey Motorsport | Ford Mustang | 21 | (Australia) Kyle Ensbey | 1–4 |
| Tekno Autosports | Ford Mustang | 22 | (Australia) Jonathon Webb | 5 |
| Opteon Motorsport | Nissan Altima (L33) | 23 | (Australia) Johnathon Bloxsom | 1–4 |
| Motorsport 25 | Chevrolet Camaro | 25 | (Australia) Reece Chapman | 1–4 |
| RDA Brakes / Perenso | Toyota Aurion (XV40) | 35 | (Australia) Darren Chamberlin | 2 |
| RDA Brakes / Perenso | Chevrolet Camaro | 36 | (Australia) Joshua Anderson | 1–4 |
| Procool Racing | Chevrolet Camaro | 47 | (Australia) Troy Jones | 4 |
| Owen Build Racing | Chevrolet Camaro | 55 | (Australia) Tyler Owen | 4 |
| Uebergang Transport | Chevrolet Camaro | 63 | (Australia) Adam Uebergang | 4 |
| Axil Coffee Rosters | Chevrolet Camaro | 65 | (Australia) David Makin | 1–4 |
| Paul Morris Motorsport | Nissan Altima (L33) | 67 | (Australia) Paul Morris | 4 |
| Muswellbrook Racing | Chevrolet Camaro | 71 | (Australia) Michael Rinkin | 1 |
| KKP Motorsport | Chevrolet Camaro | 75 | (Australia) Kel Treseder | 1–4 |
| Aughterson's Insurance Brokers | Nissan Altima (L33) | 96 | (Australia) Jeff Watters | 1–3 |
| Aussie Racing Cars | Ford Mustang | 100 | (United Kingdom) Tony Quinn | 4 |

== Calendar ==
The series was contested over seven rounds.

| Rnd | | Circuit | Date | Pole position | Fastest lap | Winning driver | Winning team |
|---|---|---|---|---|---|---|---|
| 1 | R1 | Baskerville Raceway (Old Beach, Tasmania) | February 23–25 | (Australia) Blake Sciberas | (Australia) Adam Gowans | (Australia) Justin Ruggier | Western Sydney Motorsport |
| 1 | R2 | Baskerville Raceway (Old Beach, Tasmania) | February 23–25 | | (Australia) Kel Treseder | (Australia) Justin Ruggier | Western Sydney Motorsport |
| 1 | R3 | Baskerville Raceway (Old Beach, Tasmania) | February 23–25 | | (Australia) Justin Ruggier | (Australia) Kel Treseder | KKP Motorsport |
| 1 | R4 | Baskerville Raceway (Old Beach, Tasmania) | February 23–25 | | (Australia) Joel Heinrich | (Australia) Kel Treseder | KKP Motorsport |
| 2 | R1 | (Victoria (state)) Phillip Island Grand Prix Circuit (Phillip Island, Victoria) | April 20–22 | (Australia) Kel Treseder | (Australia) Justin Ruggier | (Australia) Kel Treseder | KKP Motorsport |
| 2 | R2 | (Victoria (state)) Phillip Island Grand Prix Circuit (Phillip Island, Victoria) | April 20–22 | | (Australia) Kel Treseder | (Australia) Kel Treseder | KKP Motorsport |
| 2 | R3 | (Victoria (state)) Phillip Island Grand Prix Circuit (Phillip Island, Victoria) | April 20–22 | | (Australia) Kyle Ensbey | (Australia) Kel Treseder | KKP Motorsport |
| 3 | R1 | (Victoria (state)) Winton Motor Raceway (Benalla, Victoria | May 18–20 | (Australia) Justin Ruggier | Cancelled due to weather conditions | | |
| 3 | R2 | (Victoria (state)) Winton Motor Raceway (Benalla, Victoria | May 18–20 | | (Australia) Joel Heinrich | (Australia) Kel Treseder | KKP Motorsport |
| 3 | R3 | (Victoria (state)) Winton Motor Raceway (Benalla, Victoria | May 18–20 | | (Australia) Justin Ruggier | (Australia) Kyle Ensbey | Kyle Ensbey Motorsport |
| 3 | R4 | (Victoria (state)) Winton Motor Raceway (Benalla, Victoria | May 18–20 | | (Australia) Joel Heinrich | (Australia) Kyle Ensbey | Kyle Ensbey Motorsport |
| 4 | R1 | Queensland Raceway (Ipswich, Queensland) | July 20–22 | (Australia) Kel Treseder | (Australia) Kel Treseder | (Australia) Kyle Ensbey | Kyle Ensbey Motorsport |
| 4 | R2 | Queensland Raceway (Ipswich, Queensland) | July 20–22 | | (Australia) Blake Scibberas | (Australia) Joel Heinrich | Osborns Transport |
| 4 | R3 | Queensland Raceway (Ipswich, Queensland) | July 20–22 | | (Australia) Joel Heinrich | (Australia) Blake Scibberas | Western Sydney Motorsport |
| 4 | R4 | Queensland Raceway (Ipswich, Queensland) | July 20–22 | | (Australia) Justin Ruggier | (Australia) Joel Heinrich | Osborns Transport |
| 5 | R1 | (Queensland) The Bend Motorsport Park (Tailem Bend, South Australia) | August 24–26 | (Australia) Joel Heinrich | (Australia) Joel Heinrich | (Australia) Joel Heinrich | Osborns Transport |
| 5 | R2 | (Queensland) The Bend Motorsport Park (Tailem Bend, South Australia) | August 24–26 | | (Australia) Joel Heinrich | (Australia) Joel Heinrich | Osborns Transport |
| 5 | R3 | (Queensland) The Bend Motorsport Park (Tailem Bend, South Australia) | August 24–26 | | (Australia) Joel Heinrich | (Australia) Joel Heinrich | Osborns Transport |
| 5 | R4 | (Queensland) The Bend Motorsport Park (Tailem Bend, South Australia) | August 24–26 | | (Australia) Joel Heinrich | (Australia) Joel Heinrich | Osborns Transport |
| 6 | R1 | Sydney Motorsport Park (Eastern Creek, New South Wales) | September 21–23 | (Australia) Kel Treseder | (Australia) Kel Treseder | (Australia) Kel Treseder | KKP Motorsport |
| 6 | R2 | Sydney Motorsport Park (Eastern Creek, New South Wales) | September 21–23 | | (Australia) Joshua Anderson | (Australia) Kel Treseder | KKP Motorsport |
| 6 | R3 | Sydney Motorsport Park (Eastern Creek, New South Wales) | September 21–23 | | (Australia) Kyle Ensbey | (Australia) Kel Treseder | KKP Motorsport |
| 6 | R4 | Sydney Motorsport Park (Eastern Creek, New South Wales) | September 21–23 | | (Australia) Justin Ruggier | (Australia) Kel Treseder | KKP Motorsport |
| 7 | R1 | Surfers Paradise Street Circuit (Gold Coast, Queensland | October 19–21 | (Australia) Kel Treseder | (Australia) Paul Morris | (Australia) Paul Morris | Paul Morris Motorsport |
| 7 | R2 | Surfers Paradise Street Circuit (Gold Coast, Queensland | October 19–21 | | (Australia) Tyler Owen | (Australia) Paul Morris | Paul Morris Motorsport |
| 7 | R3 | Surfers Paradise Street Circuit (Gold Coast, Queensland | October 19–21 | | (Australia) Justin Ruggier | (Australia) Justin Ruggier | Western Sydney Motorsport |
| 7 | R4 | Surfers Paradise Street Circuit (Gold Coast, Queensland | October 19–21 | | (Australia) Justin Ruggier | (Australia) Blake Scibberas | Western Sydney Motorsport |

== Series standings ==
Series standings after six of seven rounds were as follows:

| Pos. | Driver | (Tasmania) BAS | | | | (Victoria (state)) PHI | | | (Victoria (state)) WIN | | | | (Queensland) QUE | | | | (South Australia) BEN | | | | (New South Wales) SYD | | | | (Queensland) SUR | | | | Pts. |
|---|---|---|---|---|---|---|---|---|---|---|---|---|---|---|---|---|---|---|---|---|---|---|---|---|---|---|---|---|---|
| 1 | (Australia) Kyle Ensbey | 6 | 6 | 5 | 5 | 12 | 3 | 2 | 5 | 7 | 1 | 1 | 1 | 4 | 5 | 10 | 5 | 5 | 5 | 5 | 6 | 4 | 3 | 3 | | | | | 293 |
| 2 | (Australia) Joel Heinrich | 3 | 3 | 18 | 2 | 3 | 2 | 3 | 3 | 3 | 3 | 17 | 9 | 1 | 4 | 1 | 1 | 1 | 1 | 1 | 5 | 3 | 2 | 2 | | | | | 292 |
| 3 | (Australia) Kel Treseder | 4 | 2 | 1 | 1 | 1 | 1 | 1 | 2 | 1 | 2 | 3 | 2 | 19 | Ret | 3 | 3 | 3 | 4 | 3 | 1 | 1 | 1 | 1 | | | | | 290 |
| 4 | (Australia) Justin Ruggier | 1 | 1 | 2 | 16 | 2 | Ret | 4 | 1 | 2 | 4 | 16 | 3 | 3 | 3 | 2 | 2 | 2 | 2 | 4 | 2 | 7 | 12 | 5 | | | 1 | | 282 |
| 5 | (Australia) Blake Sciberras | 7 | 5 | 14 | 4 | 6 | 5 | 9 | 4 | 4 | 5 | 2 | 4 | 7 | 1 | 5 | 9 | 4 | 7 | 10 | 3 | 5 | 5 | 4 | | | | 1 | 282 |
| 6 | (Australia) Joshua Anderson | 10 | 12 | 7 | 7 | 5 | 4 | 5 | 6 | 5 | 6 | 5 | 8 | 10 | 6 | 8 | 6 | 7 | 3 | 6 | 4 | 2 | 6 | 6 | | | | | 279 |
| 7 | (Australia) Reece Chapman | 5 | 7 | 4 | 6 | 7 | 6 | 6 | 8 | 6 | 7 | 6 | 5 | 5 | 9 | 7 | 12 | 14 | 10 | 7 | 7 | 6 | 4 | 7 | | | | | 273 |
| 8 | (Australia) Leigh Bowler | Ret | Ret | 9 | 9 | 10 | 7 | 10 | 7 | 8 | 8 | 4 | 11 | 6 | Ret | 9 | 7 | Ret | 9 | 11 | 20 | 10 | 9 | 9 | | | | | 252 |
| 9 | (Australia) Brendon Tucker | 8 | 9 | Ret | 8 | 4 | 15 | 8 | 15 | 16 | 12 | 10 | 13 | 14 | 12 | DSQ | 13 | 12 | 11 | 14 | 8 | 8 | 8 | 8 | | | | | 239 |
| 10 | (Australia) Craig Thompson | 12 | 13 | 12 | 11 | 11 | 12 | Ret | 10 | 12 | 11 | 9 | 15 | 15 | 14 | 19 | 11 | 13 | 13 | 15 | 13 | 11 | 10 | 10 | | | | | 235 |
| 11 | (Australia) Jeff Watters | 16 | 14 | 10 | 13 | 13 | 12 | 14 | 9 | 9 | 19 | 14 | 17 | 18 | 17 | 16 | 16 | 16 | 17 | 17 | 11 | 17 | 21 | 22 | | | | | 188 |
| 12 | (Australia) Johnathon Bloxsom | 14 | 16 | 13 | 14 | 17 | 18 | 15 | Ret | 14 | 13 | 13 | 14 | 13 | 16 | 13 | 14 | 9 | 18 | 18 | 9 | 9 | 7 | 11 | | | | | 184 |
| 13 | (Australia) Charlotte Poynting | Ret | 10 | 8 | 15 | 9 | Ret | 12 | 11 | Ret | 14 | 11 | 24 | 17 | 13 | Ret | Ret | 18 | 15 | 19 | 10 | 13 | 14 | 17 | | | | | 176 |
| 14 | (Australia) David Makin | 11 | 8 | Ret | Ret | 21 | 14 | Ret | 17 | 15 | 18 | 15 | 19 | 16 | 19 | 14 | 17 | Ret | 16 | 16 | 16 | 15 | 15 | 15 | | | | | 173 |
| 15 | (Australia) Madison Dunston | 9 | 19 | 11 | 10 | 18 | 13 | 13 | 13 | DSQ | 20 | Ret | 22 | 24 | 18 | 15 | 15 | 19 | 21 | 20 | 12 | 12 | 11 | 13 | | | | | 169 |
| 16 | (Australia) Grant Thompson | 15 | 15 | 15 | DNS | 14 | 11 | 18 | Ret | DNS | DNS | DNS | 18 | 20 | 21 | 21 | 18 | 21 | Ret | 22 | 17 | 14 | 13 | 12 | | | | | 162 |
| 17 | (Australia) Adam Clark | 13 | 11 | 6 | 13 | 15 | 9 | 11 | | | | | | | | | 10 | 8 | 6 | 8 | 14 | 19 | 16 | 18 | | | | | 128 |
| 18 | (Australia) Emma Clark | | | | | 16 | 19 | 19 | 16 | 17 | 16 | Ret | 20 | 23 | 15 | 20 | | | | | 15 | 22 | 18 | 20 | | | | | 99 |
| 19 | (Australia) Ian Chivas | | | | | 19 | 17 | 16 | | | | | 21 | 22 | 22 | 17 | 19 | 22 | 24 | Ret | 21 | 16 | 20 | 20 | | | | | 94 |
| 20 | (Australia) Tyler Owen | | | | | | | | | | | | 6 | 9 | 7 | 6 | 8 | 6 | 8 | 9 | | | | | | | | | 90 |
| 21 | (Australia) Bruce Heinrich | | | | | | | | Ret | 11 | 10 | 11 | | | | | Ret | 10 | 19 | 12 | | | | | | | | | 79 |
| 22 | (Australia) Troy Dontas | | | | | 20 | 16 | 17 | 12 | 13 | 15 | 12 | | | | | | | | | | | | | | | | | 72 |
| 23 | (Australia) Keelan Dunston | | | | | 23 | 21 | 21 | | | | | | | | | 20 | 17 | 20 | 24 | | | | | | | | | 60 |
| 24 | (Australia) Ruth Bowler | 18 | 18 | 17 | 17 | | | | | | | | | | | | 22 | 23 | 25 | Ret | | | | | | | | | 59 |
| 25 | (Australia) Adam Gowans | 2 | 4 | 3 | 3 | | | | | | | | | | | | | | | | | | | | | | | | 50 |
| 26 | (Australia) Paul Morris | | | | | | | | | | | | 10 | 2 | 2 | 4 | | | | | | | | | 1 | 1 | | | 48 |
| 27 | (Australia) Daniel Price | | | | | | | | | | | | | | | | 4 | 11 | 12 | 2 | | | | | | | | | 46 |
| 28 | (Australia) Darren Chamberlin | | | | | 8 | 8 | 7 | | | | | | | | | | | | | | | | | | | | | 45 |
| 29 | (Australia) Sheridan Phillips | | | | | | | | 14 | 10 | 9 | 7 | | | | | | | | | | | | | | | | | 44 |
| 30 | (Australia) Ben Tomlin | | | | | | | | | | | | 16 | 12 | 11 | 11 | | | | | | | | | | | | | 41 |
| 31 | (Australia) Adam Uebergang | | | | | | | | | | | | 7 | 11 | 8 | 18 | | | | | | | | | | | | | 40 |
| 32 | (Australia) Hamish Leighton | | | | | | | | | | | | | | | | Ret | 15 | 14 | 13 | | | | | | | | | 36 |
| 33 | (Australia) Michael Rinkin | 17 | 17 | 16 | Ret | | | | | | | | | | | | | | | | | | | | | | | | 34 |
| 34 | (Australia) Peter Herd | | | | | | | | 18 | 18 | 17 | 18 | | | | | | | | | | | | | | | | | 34 |
| 35 | (Australia) Ross Higgins | | | | | 22 | 20 | 20 | | | | | | | | | | | | | | | | | | | | | 30 |
| 36 | (Australia) Troy Jones | | | | | | | | | | | | 23 | 21 | 20 | 22 | | | | | 18 | 20 | Ret | 19 | | | | | 30 |
| 37 | (Australia) Jonathan Webb | | | | | | | | | | | | | | | | Ret | 20 | 23 | 21 | | | | | | | | | 29 |
| 38 | (Australia) Pawel Faber | | | | | | | | | | | | | | | | 21 | Ret | 22 | 23 | | | | | | | | | 28 |
