= A2X =

A2X may refer to:

- A2X Markets, a South African stock exchange
- A2X, an ad exchange; see List of Cisneros entities
- Haplogroup A2x, a subgroup of Haplogroup A (mtDNA)
- a2x, a software program in the AsciiDoc software tool package
- The A2x family of microprocessors created by Allwinner Technology

== See also ==
- AX-2 (disambiguation)
- AXX (disambiguation)
- AAX (disambiguation)
- ATX (disambiguation)
