= Ax (surname) =

Ax is a surname. It may be a German occupational surname metonymically derived from the word Ax, 'axe' (axe maker, woodcutter, carpenter). Notable people with the surname include:

- Emanuel Ax (born 1949), Polish-American pianist and academic
- James Ax (1937–2006), American mathematician
- Kathlen Ax (born 1993), Finnish handball player
- Patrick Ax (born 1979), Dutch footballer
- Peter Ax (1927–2013), German zoologist
