= AAX (cryptocurrency exchange) =

Defunct cryptocurrency exchange

- Type: Private
- Industry: Cryptocurrency
- Founded: 2018 in Hong Kong
- Founder: Thor Chan
- Defunct: December 16, 2022
- Fate: Bankruptcy
- Area served: Worldwide
- Services: P2P, Spot, Perpetual Contracts
- Website: aax.com

Atom Asset Exchange (AAX) was a cryptocurrency exchange that was based in Hong Kong.

== History ==
AAX was founded in Hong Kong in 2018 by Thor Chan, who became its chief executive. In January 2019, AAX implemented Millennium Exchange matching system of London Stock Exchange on its platform. The exchange began its operations in November 2019. Later, AAX expanded its operations to Turkey.

On November 11, 2022, AAX said it had no financial exposure to FTX or its affiliates. The next day, it froze withdrawals and other transactions due to system maintenance. On November 13, it said that an error by a third-party partner during a system upgrade had affected some user data, that withdrawals would be handled manually and that it would try to resume normal operations within seven to ten days. It said withdrawals had been suspended to prevent fraud and exploitation, and that it had planned the upgrade to guard against fraud and malicious attacks that had followed the collapse of FTX. On November 15, AAX said it had stopped withdrawals because its capital position was under acute pressure, and on November 19 it said it was weighing a bond issue to raise funds. Two days later, it said it would automatically close all futures positions on the platform.

On November 28, AAX vice-president Ben Caselin announced his resignation. The same day, the exchange's Facebook and YouTube accounts were taken down. AAX stopped providing services on December 16, 2022, leaving customers unable to log in or check their balances. In July 2023, a court in the Cayman Islands ordered AAX's parent company, Atom Holdings, to be wound up.

== Operations ==
AAX was run from offices in North Point, Hong Kong. Its trading platform was owned by a company registered in Seychelles. Its parent company, Atom Holdings, was registered in the Cayman Islands.

AAX had employees in Hong Kong, Singapore, Estonia, Russia, the United Kingdom, the Philippines and Malaysia.

== Legal status ==
=== Hong Kong ===
AAX was not licensed by Hong Kong's Securities and Futures Commission (SFC). It had reportedly applied to the SFC for a licence to operate a virtual asset trading platform, which had not been granted by the time of its collapse, and it operated and closed before Hong Kong's mandatory licensing regime for such platforms took effect in June 2023. In 2019, Chan had said that AAX welcomed regulation but expected part of the market to remain unregulated for a while.

The Hong Kong Police Force began receiving complaints about AAX on November 16, 2022. By December 23, it had received 337 reports from people in Hong Kong, mainland China, Taiwan, Italy, France and elsewhere, 190 of them from Hong Kong residents, involving losses of about HK$98 million. That day, police arrested two men aged 37 and 44 who had worked for the exchange on suspicion of fraud, and the younger man was also arrested for misleading police officers. Police said that the company's liquid assets were already in difficulty when it announced the system maintenance, which had been used as a pretext to stop customers withdrawing their assets. They said that the exchange's alleged mastermind had left Hong Kong with its cryptocurrency wallet and private keys, which held about US$30 million. Police froze about HK$2 million held in bank accounts belonging to the company and the suspects, as well as two Hong Kong properties worth about HK$55 million.

On July 18, 2024, a 39-year-old man suspected of managing the platform, who had left Hong Kong in November 2022, was arrested when he returned to the city and was charged with theft. By then, 890 people had reported losses totalling HK$208 million. In February 2026, the man, Su Weiyi, a shareholder of Atom Holdings, was charged at the Eastern Magistrates' Courts with three counts of theft and one of fraud. Police said that after the platform stopped operating, the person in charge of it had withdrawn cryptocurrency worth about HK$633 million, and that 191 victims who had given statements had lost about HK$81 million. The case was adjourned to April 2026.

=== Cayman Islands ===
Atom Holdings was registered in Cayman Islands. In July 2023, a Cayman court ordered it to be wound up and appointed officials of Quantuma as joint official liquidators.

=== Nigeria ===
AAX was active in Nigeria at a time when cryptocurrency trading in the country faced an official crackdown. In April 2022, it became a member of the Stakeholders in the Blockchain Technology Association of Nigeria (SiBAN). In November 2022, a student ambassador was briefly arrested after investors who had put about $30,000 into AAX on his recommendation reported him to the authorities. He later received threats from people demanding refunds and had to sell land to repay investors.

=== Seychelles ===
AAX signed trading agreements with customers through AAX Limited, a company registered in Seychelles. AAX users complained about Atom Holdings and related companies to the Seychelles Anti-Corruption Commission.

=== Singapore ===
AAX had staff in Singapore. Its users complained about Atom Holdings and related companies to the Singapore police. Su Weiyi had links through two companies to two people born in mainland China who were implicated in a money-laundering case in Singapore involving billions of dollars.
