= A20 cells =

Cell line

A20 cells, also called ATCC TIB-208, is a cell line originally derived from B-cell lymphoma in an old BALB/c mouse. A20 cells are BALB/c lymphoma cells derived from spontaneous reticulum cell neoplasm. ATCC TIB-208 cells originated from B-cell lymphoma in the reticulum cell sarcoma of an elderly BALB/c mouse. A20 cells are used in medical research such as drug screening or vaccine target selection. A20 cells are also highly responsive to immunomodulatory antibodies, and are therefore used frequently in immunotherapy drug studies.
