= Toyota Aurion =

Australian mid-size car

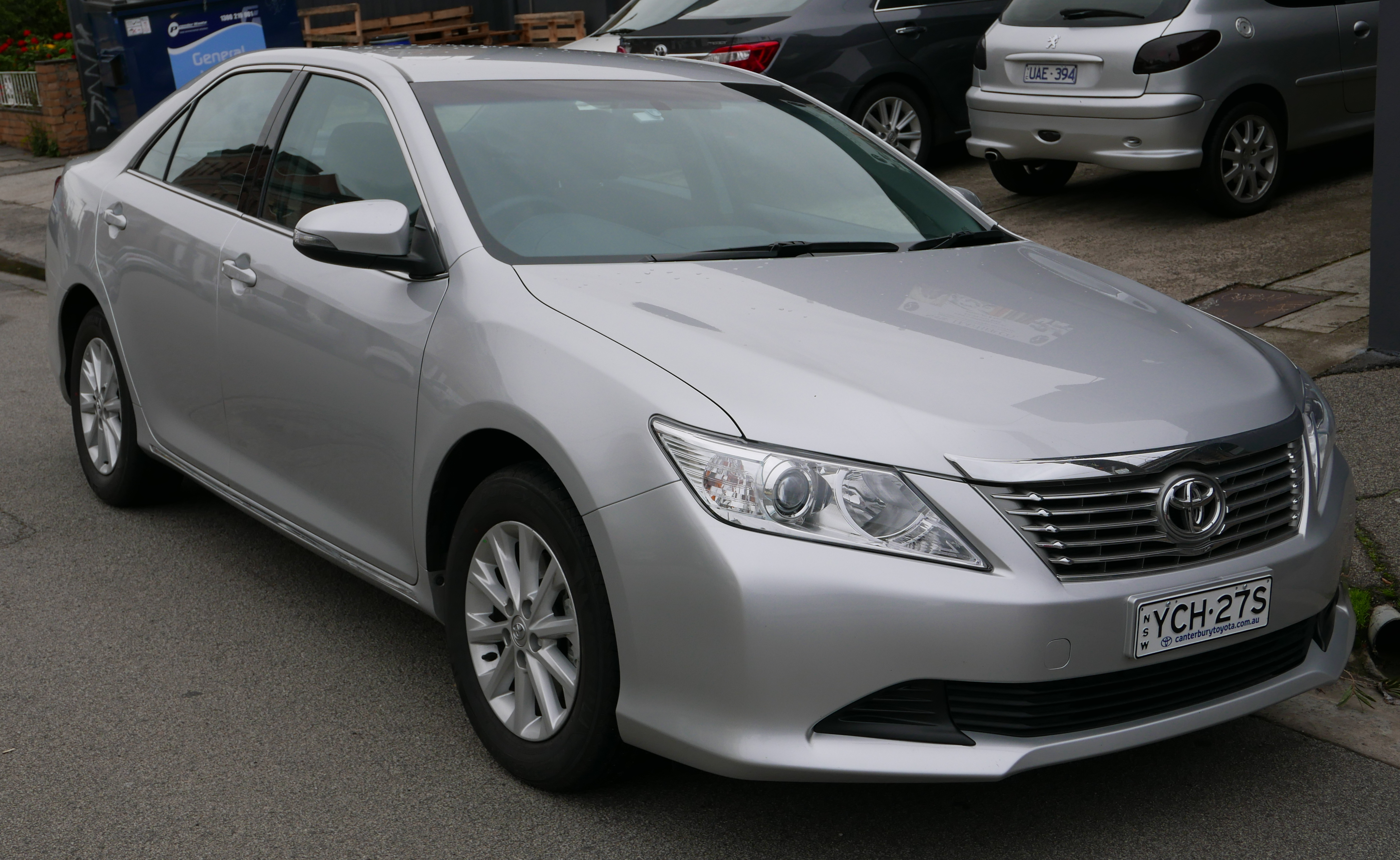

Overview
- Manufacturer: Toyota
- Also called: Toyota Camry
- Production: 2006–2017
- Designer: Nick Hogios (2004; XV40 model); Anthony Cheung (2007; facelift XV40 model); Hirofumi Fukui and Kazumi Kowaki (2009; XV50 model); Naohiko Suzuki (Sportivo XV50 model); Keisuke Matsuno (2009; facelift XV50 model)

Body and chassis
- Class: Mid-size car
- Body style: 4-door sedan
- Layout: Front-engine, front-wheel drive
- Related: Toyota Camry; Lexus ES

Chronology
- Predecessor: Toyota Avalon (XX10); Toyota Camry (XV30)
- Successor: Toyota Camry (XV70)

The Toyota Aurion /ˈɔːriən/ is a mid-size car produced by Toyota in Australia and parts of Asia from 2006 to 2017. In the two generations it was produced, the Aurion was derived from the equivalent Camry. Changes were mainly limited to revised front- and rear-end treatment, along with changes to the interior. The Camry-based Aurion was also sold in the majority of East and Southeast Asia as the Toyota Camry, with the original version of the Camry sold alongside the Aurion in Australasia and the Middle East. In the previous two markets, the car replaced the Avalon model, which can trace its roots back to the early 1990s. A total of 111,140 Aurions were sold over the 10 year Australian production span.

The name "Aurion" was derived from the Greek word meaning "tomorrow" (αὔριον).

== First generation (XV40; 2006) ==
The first generation Aurion was on sale from 2006 to 2012. In Australia and New Zealand, it replaced the Toyota Avalon (XX10). In some markets, this car is referred to as the "prestige" Camry. The Aurion shares most of its tooling, drivetrain, and centre body work, with restyled front and rear ends and interior fittings.

In August 2007, Toyota Australia released a heavily enhanced, high performance version known as the TRD Aurion, with a supercharged V6 engine, full bodykit and more performance upgrades. It was discontinued in March 2009 due to poor sales, as Toyota was only able to build and sell 537 examples in its one and a half years on sale.

=== Pre-facelift ===
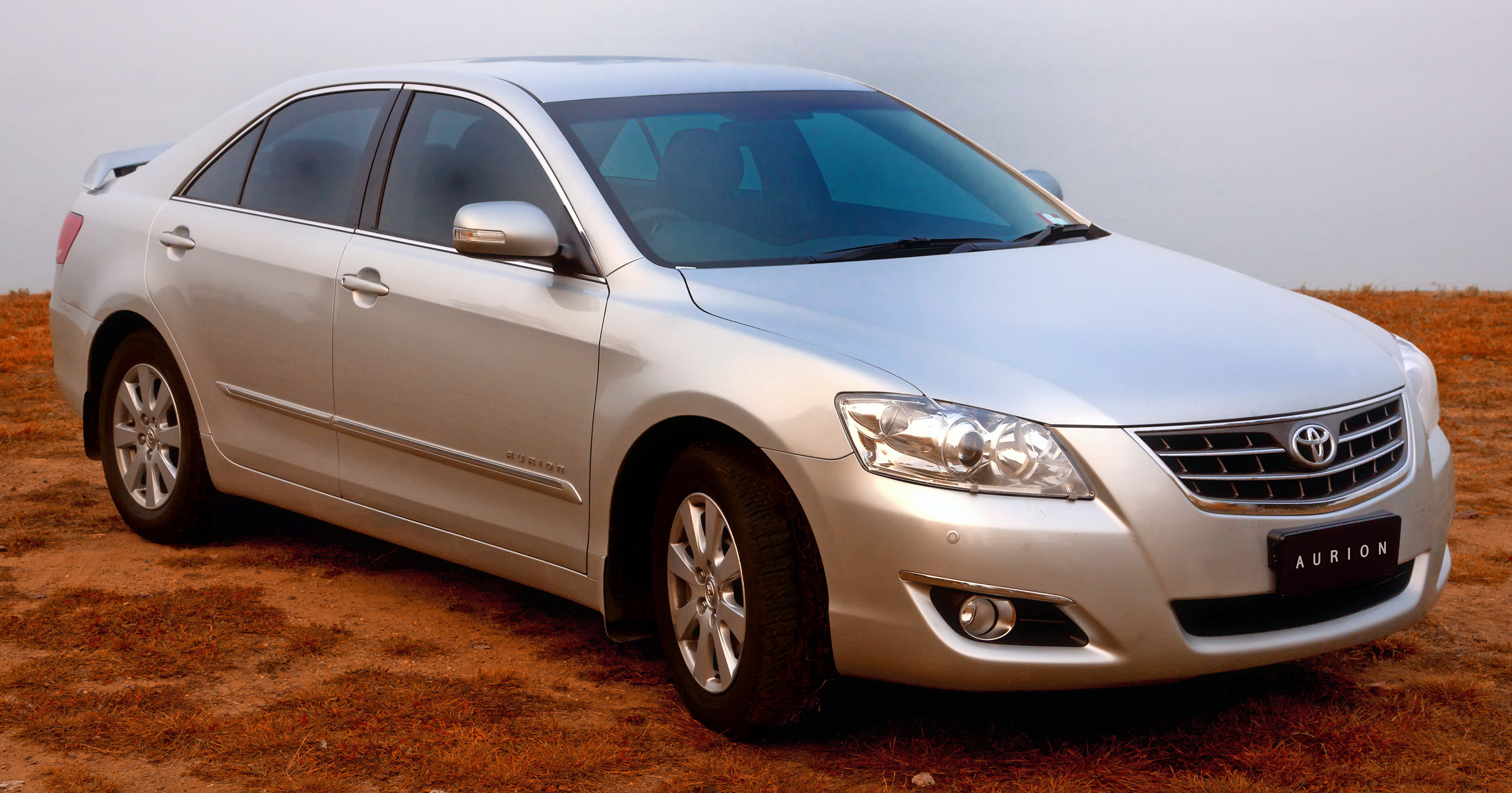
Aurion Prodigy (pre-facelift)

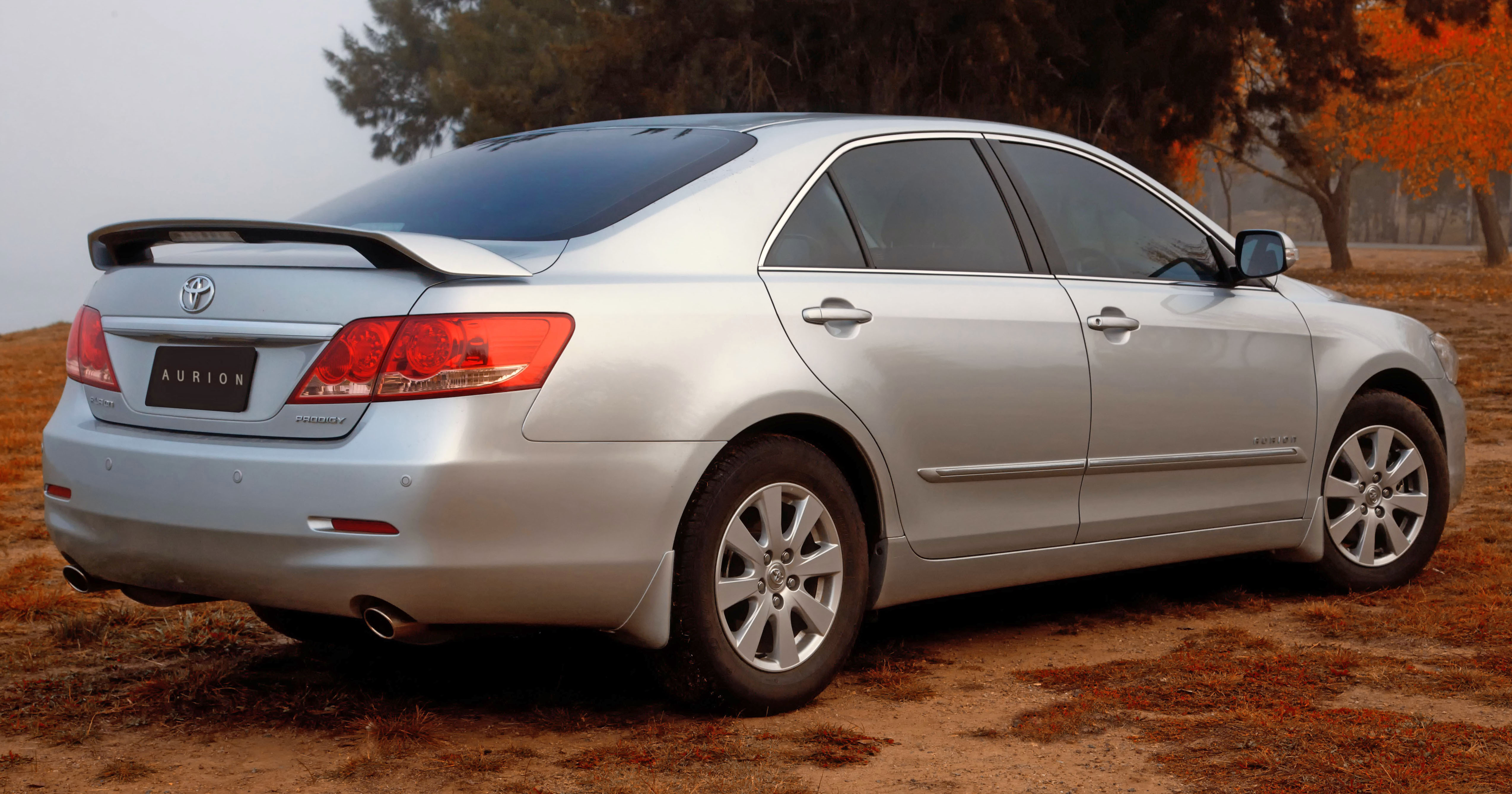
Aurion Prodigy (pre-facelift)

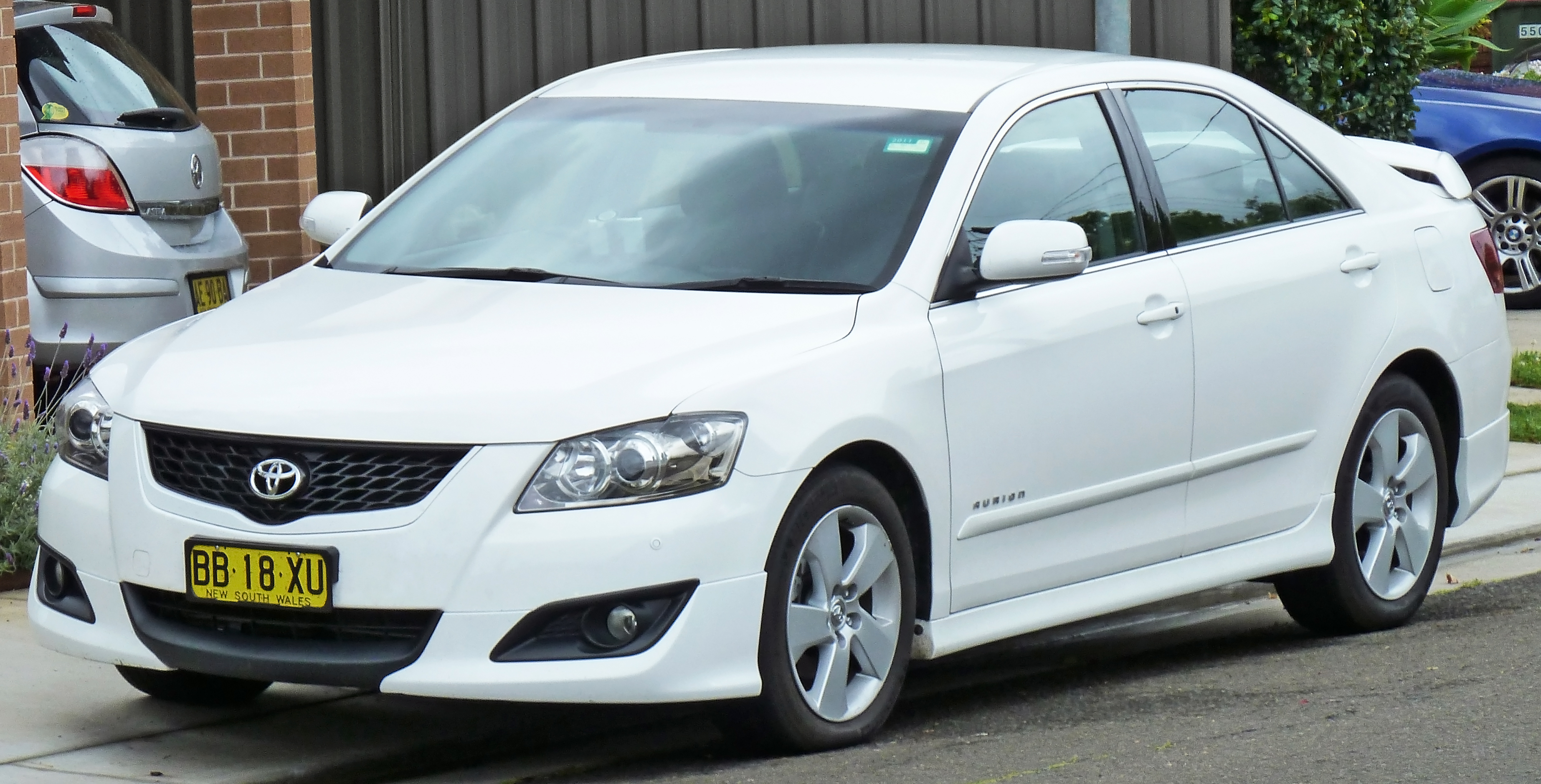
Aurion Sportivo ZR6 (pre-facelift)

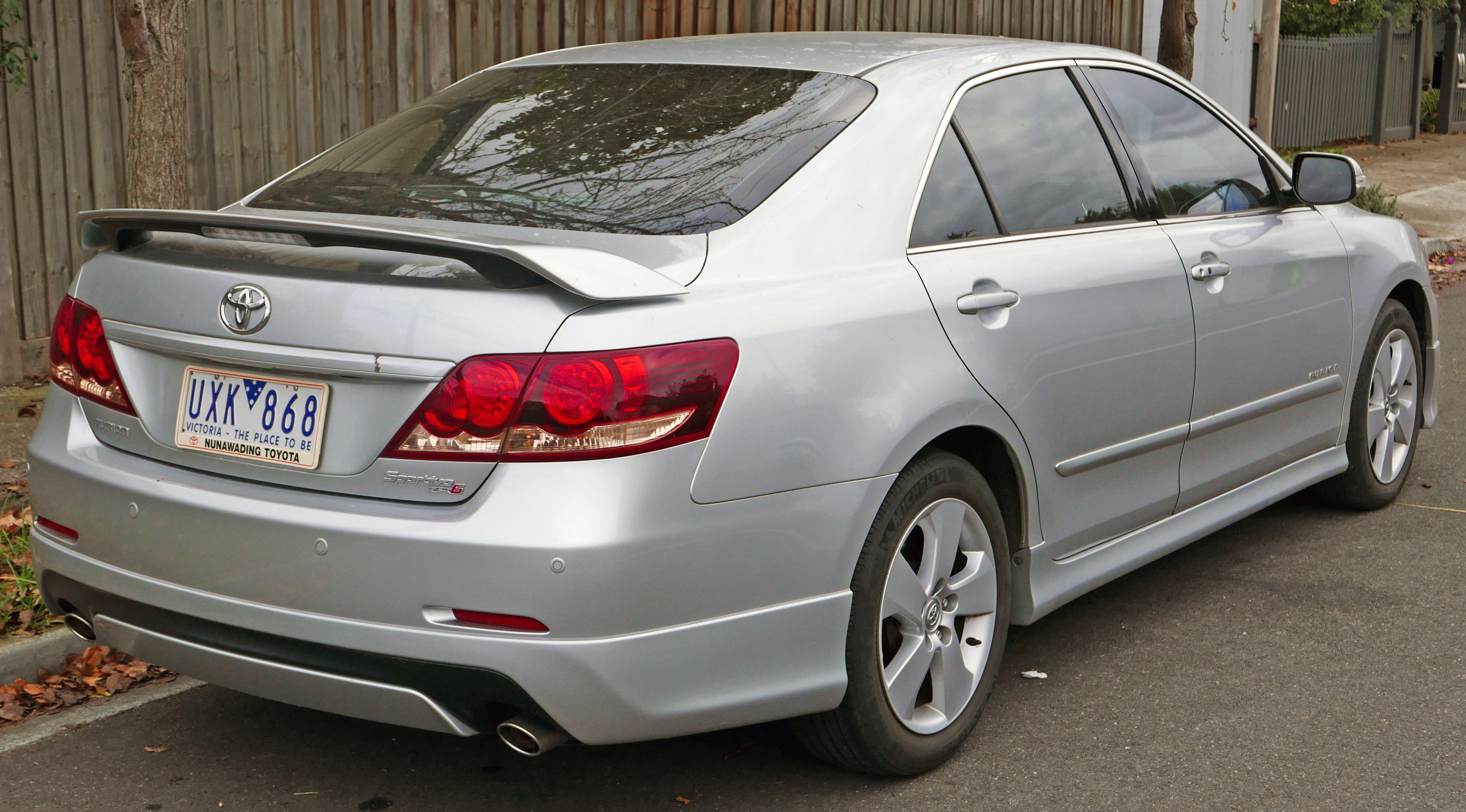
Aurion Sportivo ZR6 (pre-facelift)

=== Facelift (2009) ===
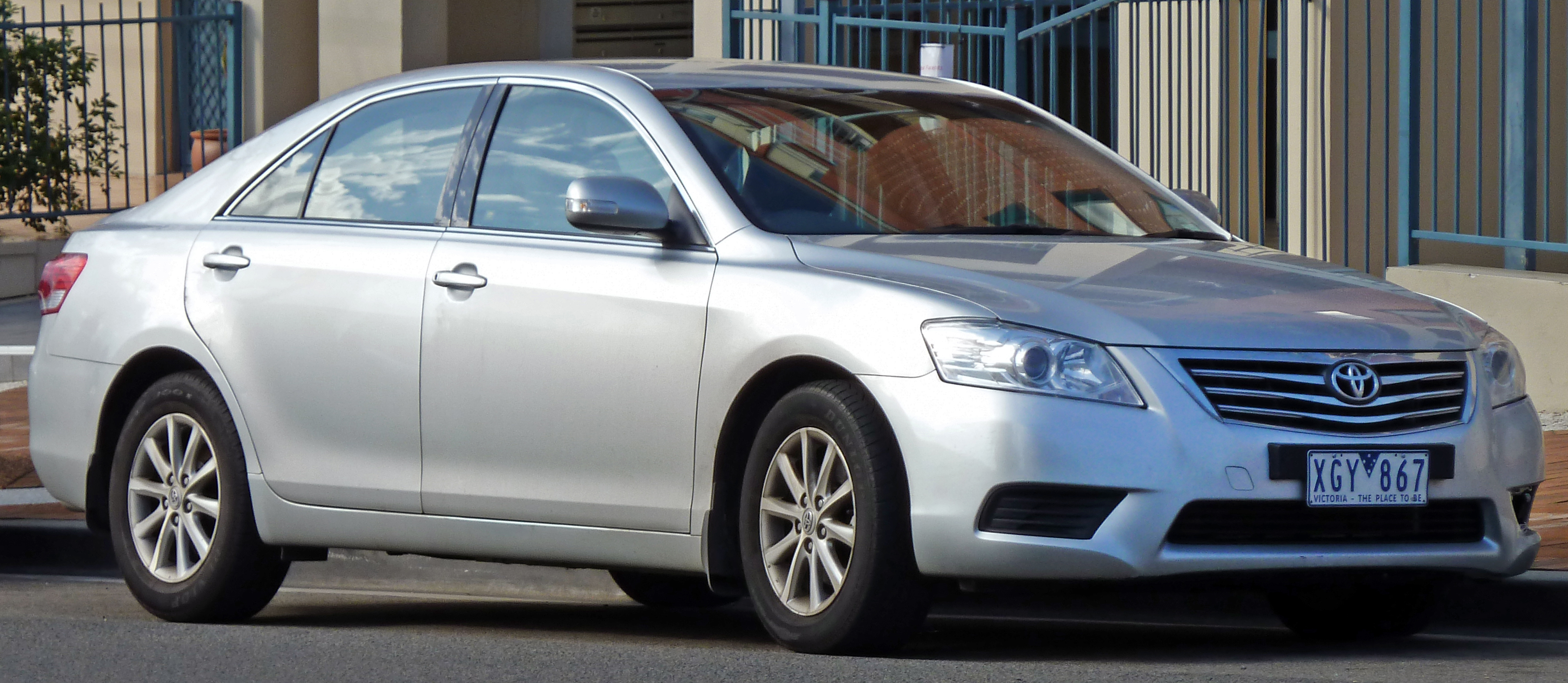
Aurion AT-X (facelift)

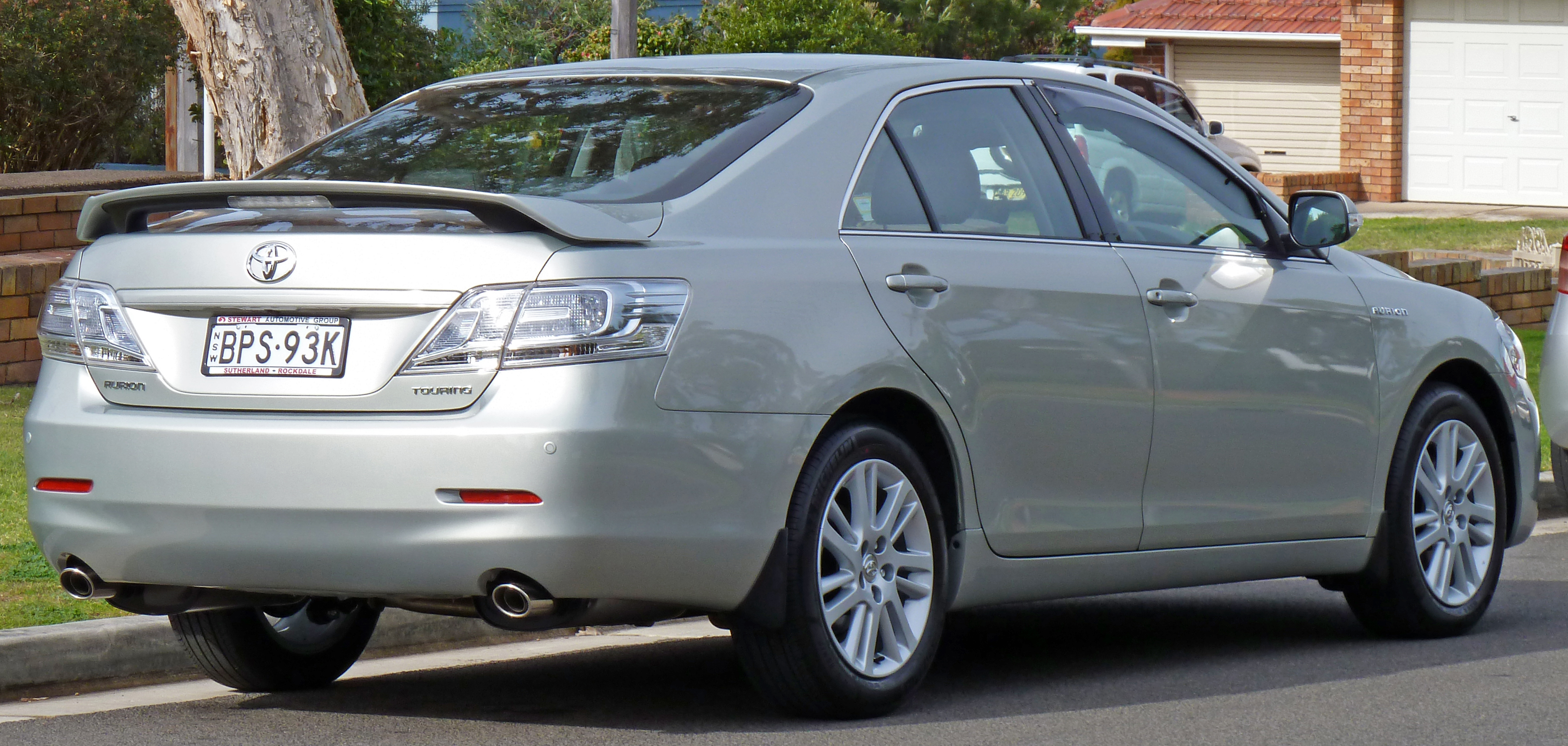
Aurion Touring (facelift)

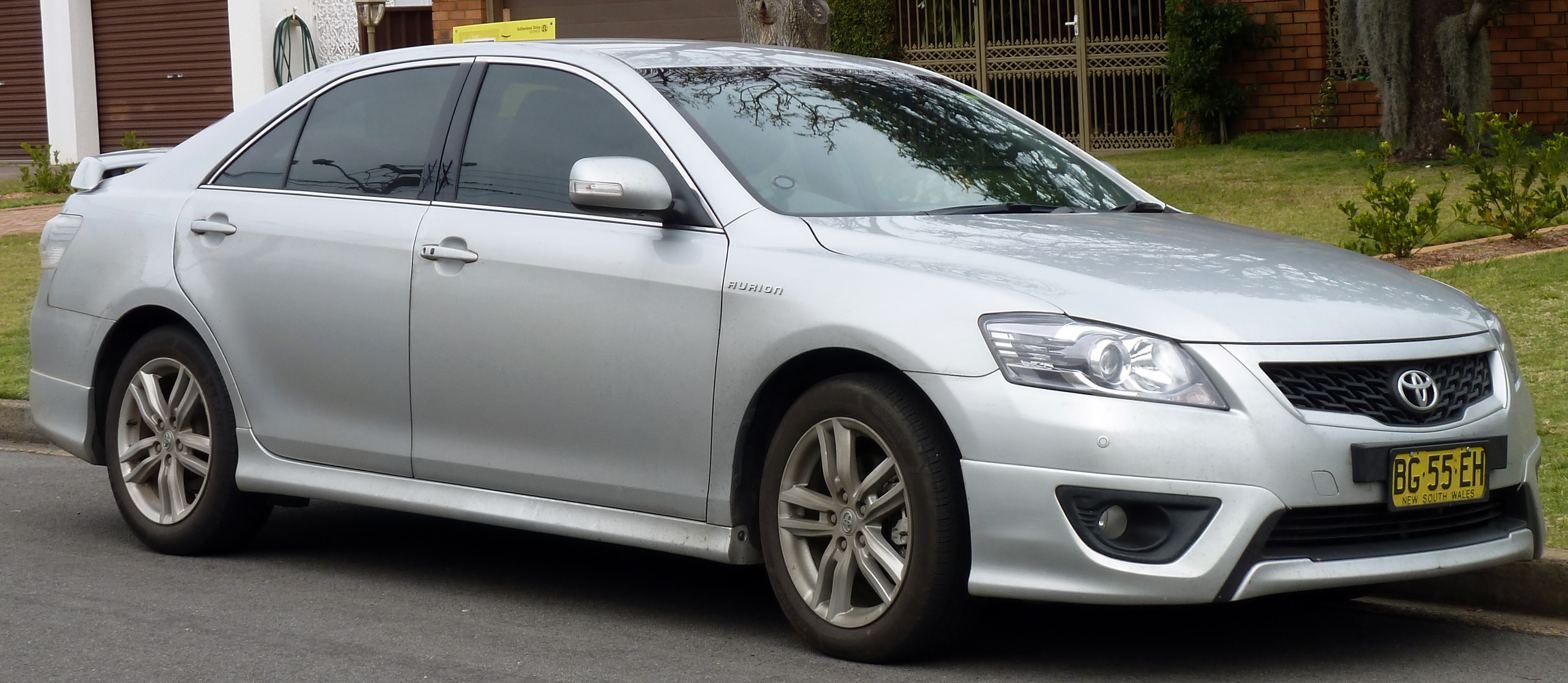
Aurion Sportivo ZR6 (facelift)

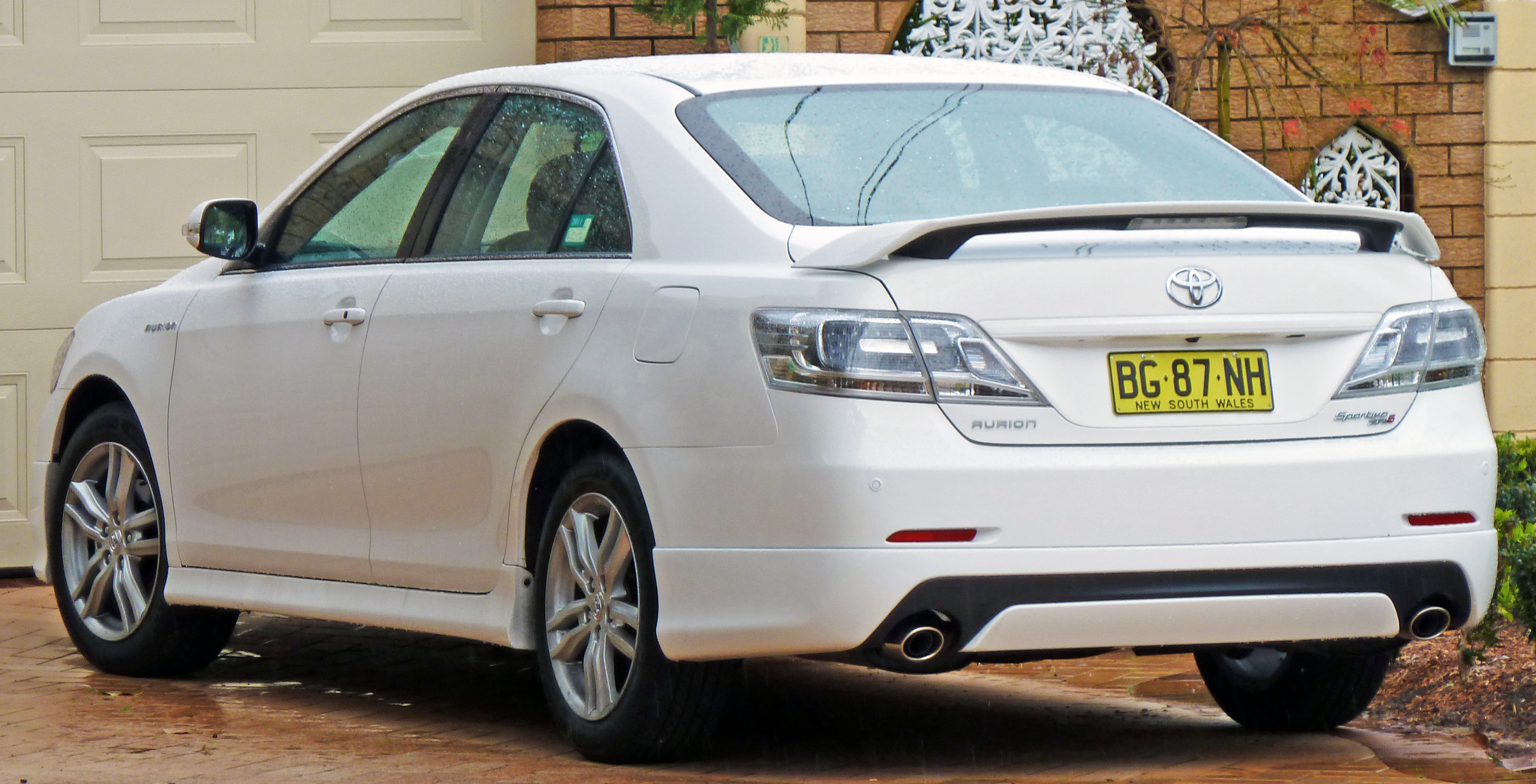
Aurion Sportivo ZR6 (facelift)

Year	Units sold
2006 (November–December)	3,037
2007	22,036
2008	19,562
2009	13,910
2010	11,764
2011	8,915
2012 (January)	989
Total	80,213

=== Safety ===
ANCAP test results* Toyota Aurion AT-X (2007)
Test	Score
Overall	4 /5 stars
Frontal offset	13.59/16
Side impact	15.44/16
Pole	Not Assessed
Seat belt reminders	1/3
Whiplash protection	Not Assessed
Pedestrian protection	Poor
Electronic stability control	Standard

ANCAP test results* Toyota Aurion all variants (2010)
Test	Score
Overall	5 /5 stars
Frontal offset	13.59/16
Side impact	15.44/16
Pole	2/2
Seat belt reminders	2/3
Whiplash protection	Not Assessed
Pedestrian protection	Poor
Electronic stability control	Standard

== Second generation (XV50; 2011) ==
After production started in February 2012, April 2012 saw the release of the second generation Aurion in Australia and New Zealand. The same model designations applied in Australia in tie with the first generation model, those being: AT-X, Sportivo SX6, Sportivo ZR6, Prodigy, and Presara. In New Zealand, the model designations are: AT-X, Touring, and Sportivo SX6.

This nameplate is again based on the Camry. The all new model has been available for some Asian and European markets as a Camry since 2011. The same, separate model designations of the Camry and Aurion are on sale in Australia and New Zealand. For the first time, with the XV50 model, the Japanese market Camry is now based on the same design as the "prestige" Camry or Aurion, rather than the "regular" Camry. The "prestige" Camry was designed in Japan by Hirofumi Fukui, Kazumi Kowaki and Keisuke Matsuno in 2009 and unveiled in Ukraine on 25 August 2011.

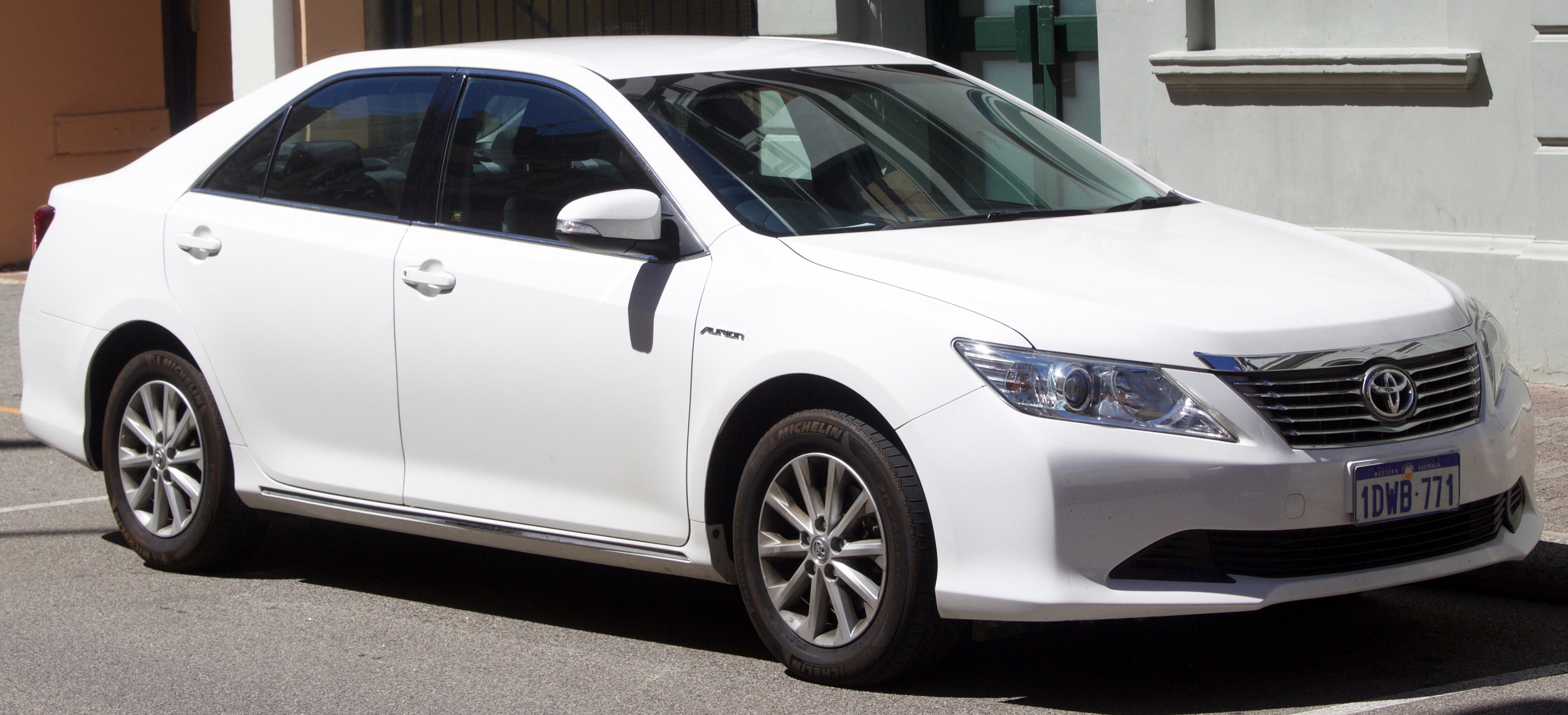
Aurion AT-X (pre-facelift)

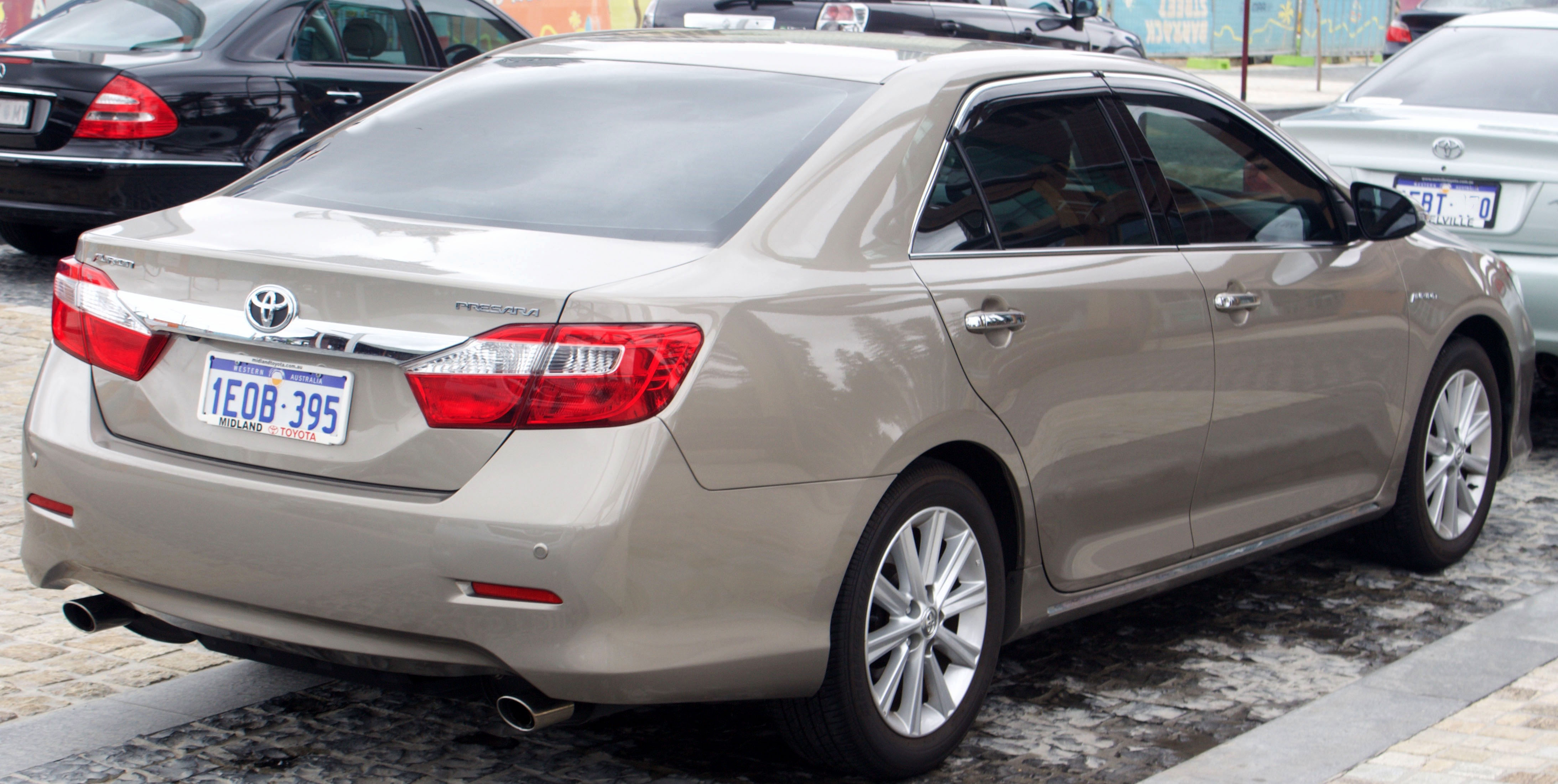
Aurion Presara (pre-facelift)

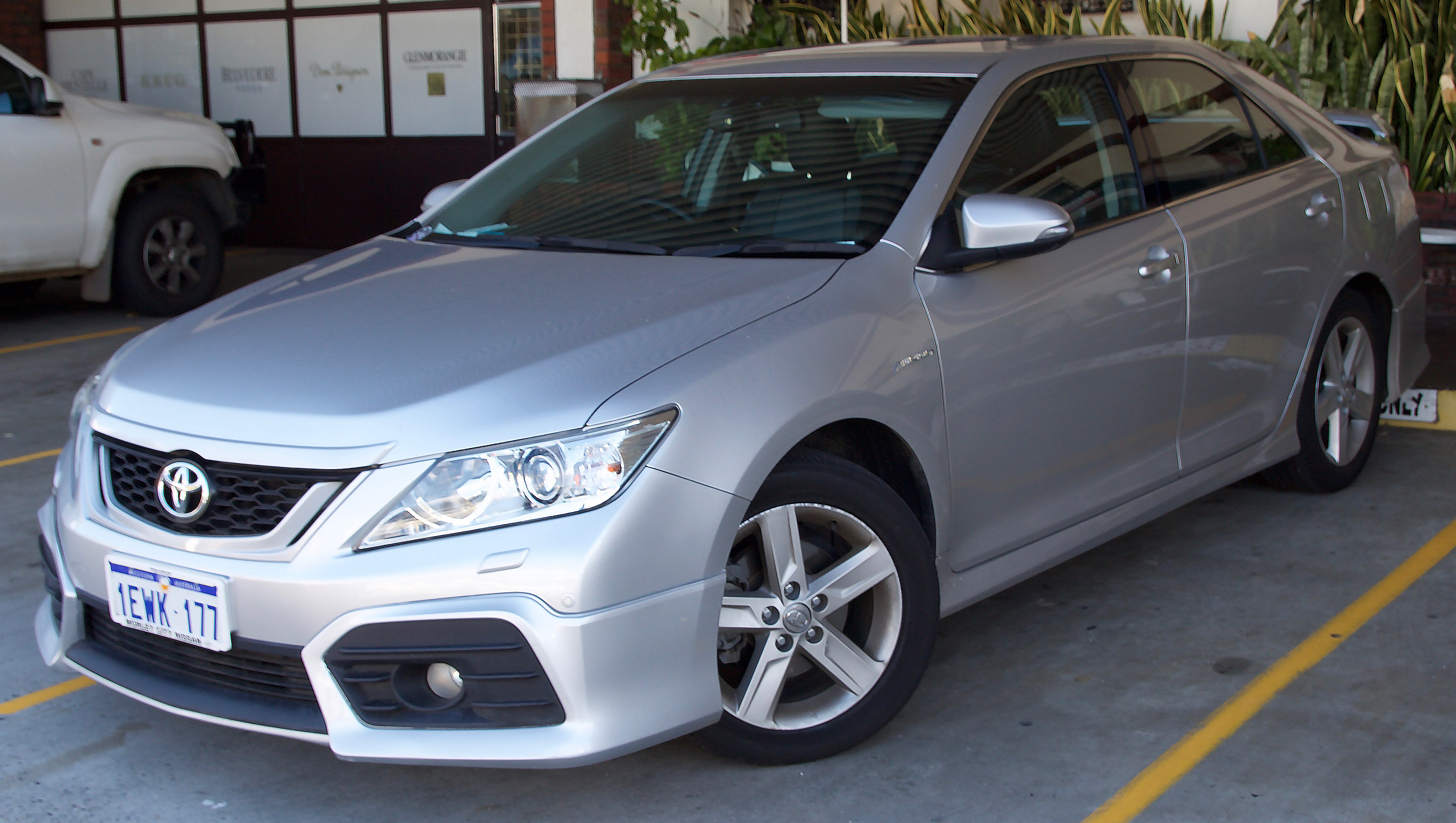
Aurion Sportivo ZR6 (pre-facelift)

=== Facelift ===
The Aurion-based Camry, sold in Japan and other Asian markets, received a large facelift in 2014. It was discontinued in Japan in July 2017 and in Southeast Asia in late 2018, and it was replaced by the TNGA-based XV70 Camry.

In Australia, however, the Aurion itself received a much smaller facelift, with little exterior changes. The Prodigy trim was deleted from the range, and the Sportivo SX6 and ZR6 were merged to form a single Sportivo trim. The revised trim for the Australian market were: AT-X, Sportivo and Presara.

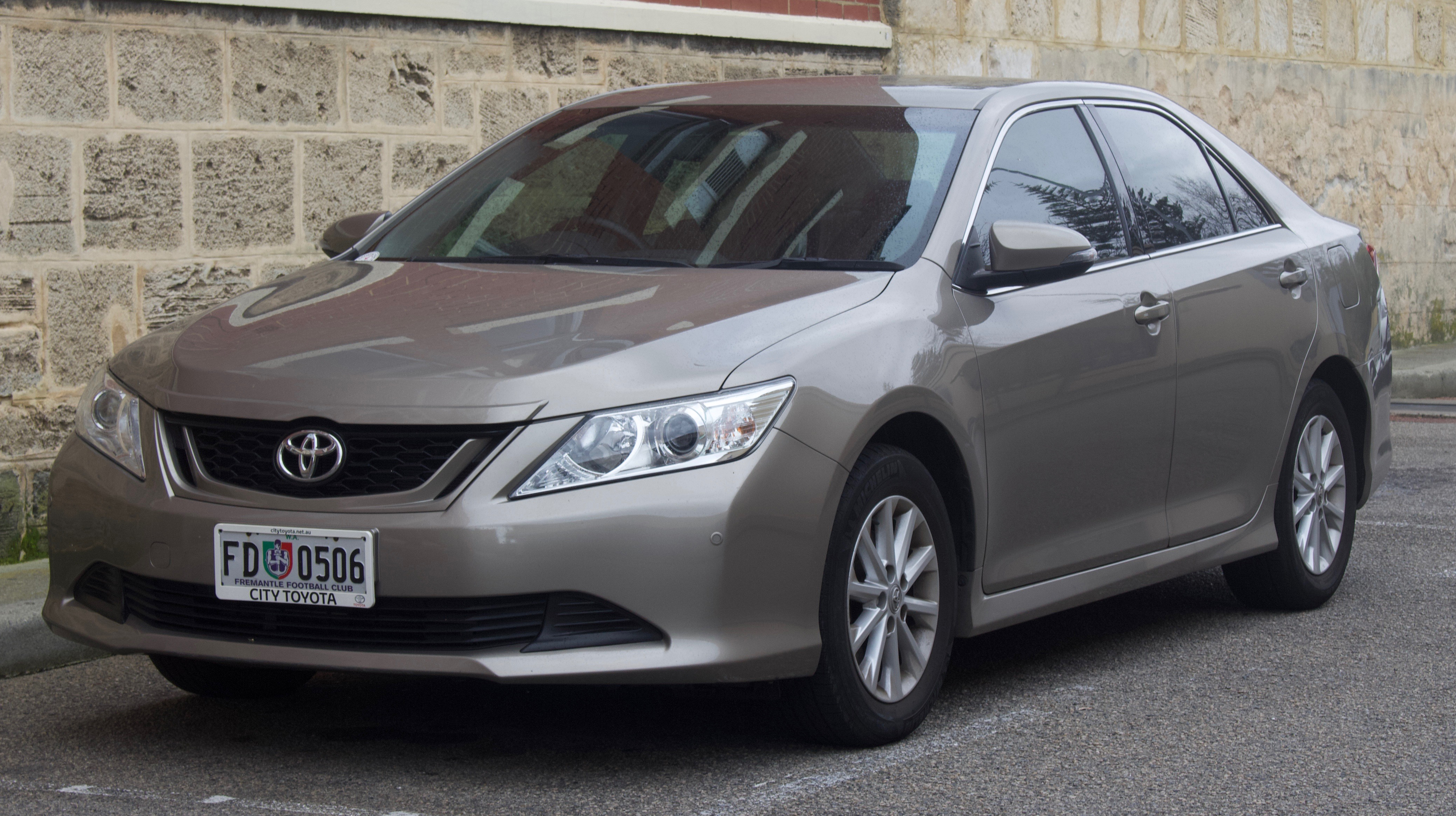
Aurion AT-X (facelift)

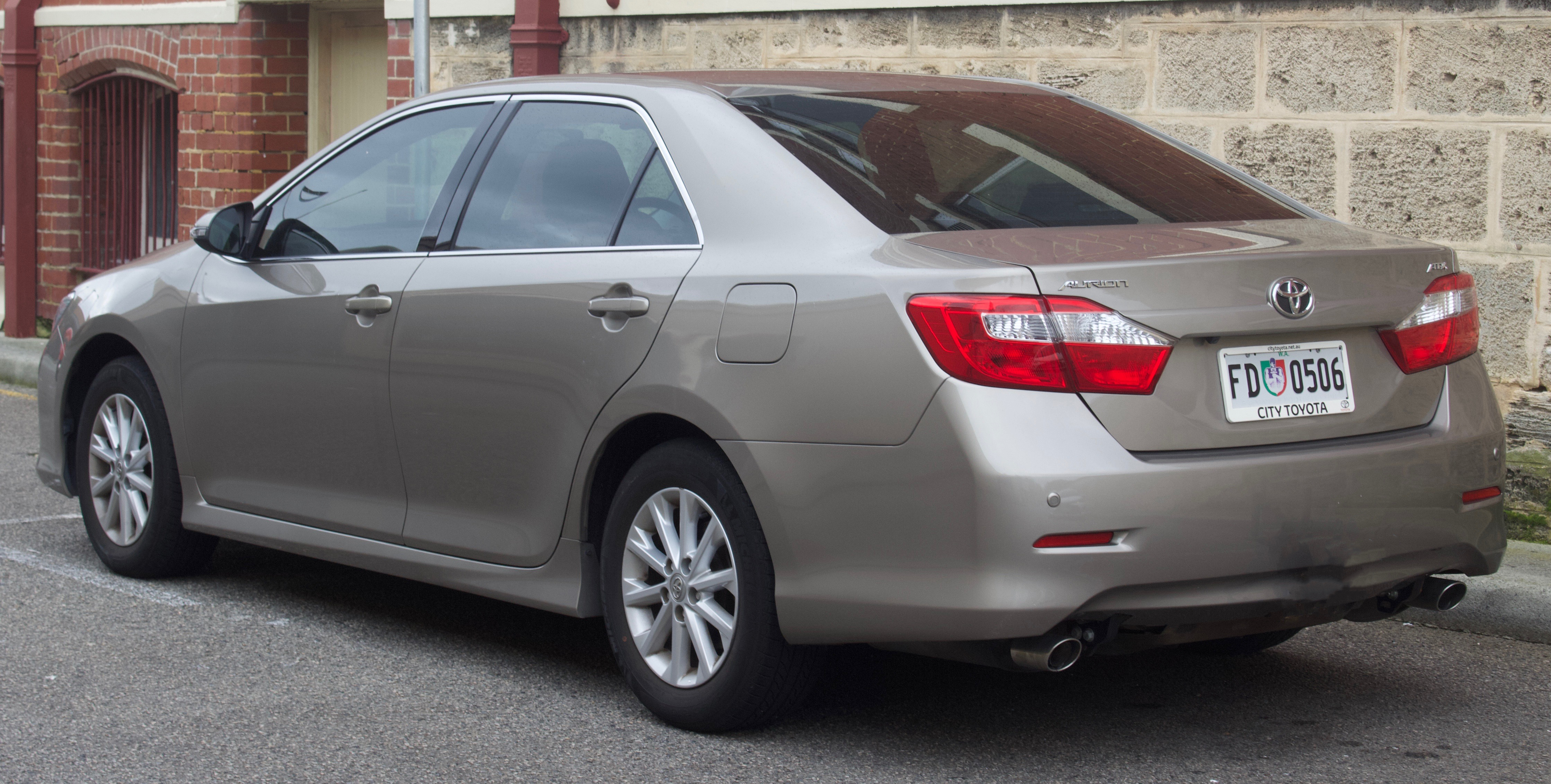
Aurion AT-X (facelift)

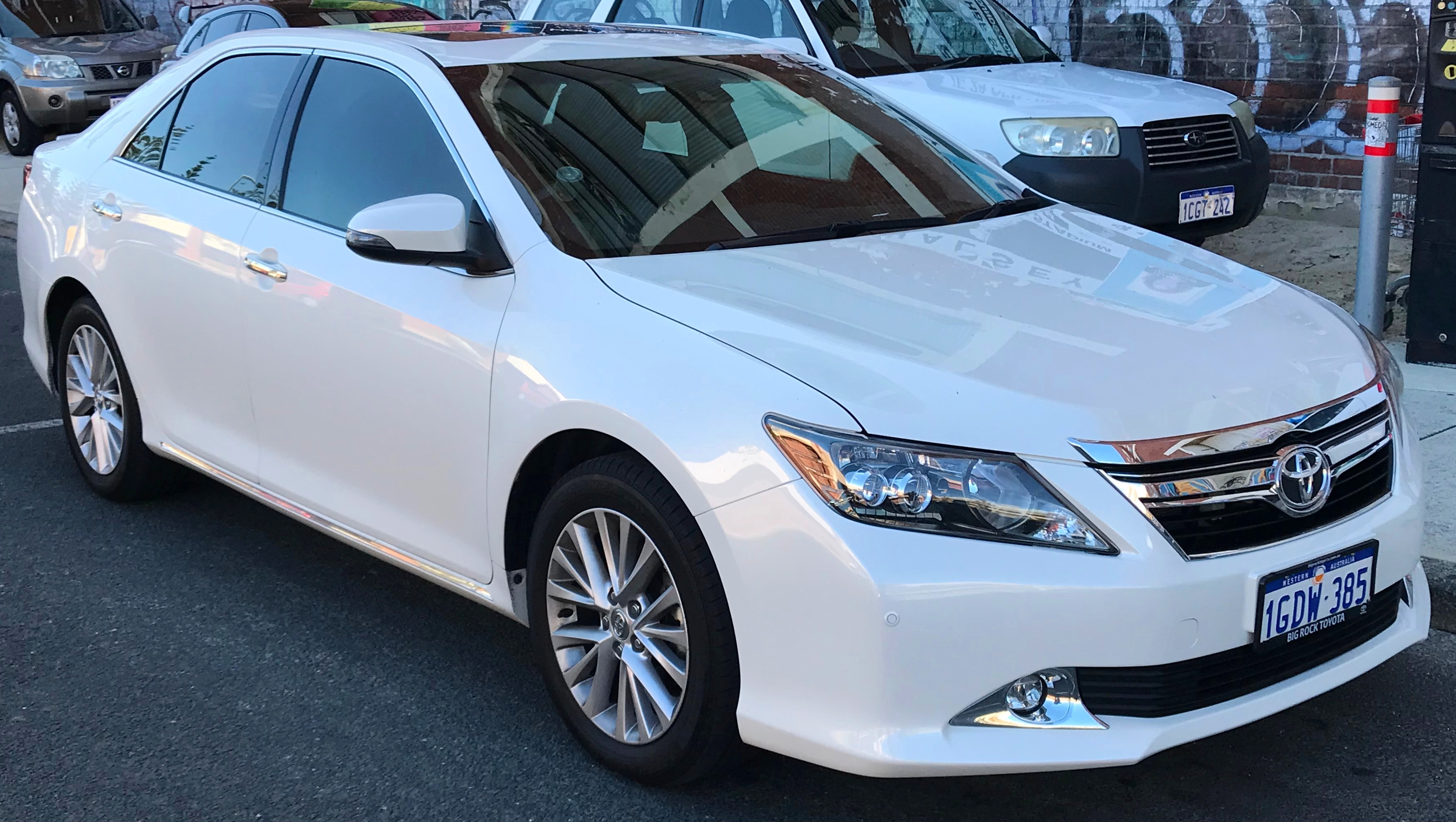
Aurion Presara (facelift)

=== Special Editions ===
In 2012, the Aurion in Australia released the Touring SE variant. Only 1500 were built, all of which were based on the AT-X. It added a rear spoiler, front fog lamps, as well as a sports grille on the exterior. The interior features contained a similar interior as the AT-X, except it included steering wheel with audio controls and sport pedals.

=== Safety ===
ANCAP test results* Toyota Aurion (2012)
Test	Score
Overall	5 /5 stars
Frontal offset	15.59/16
Side impact	16/16
Pole	2/2
Seat belt reminders	3/3
Whiplash protection	Adequate
Pedestrian protection	Adequate
Electronic stability control	Standard

ANCAP test results* Toyota Aurion (2014)
Test	Score
Overall	5 /5 stars
Frontal offset	15.59/16
Side impact	16/16
Pole	2/2
Seat belt reminders	3/3
Whiplash protection	Adequate
Pedestrian protection	Adequate
Electronic stability control	Standard

=== Replacement/Successor ===
Production of the second generation Aurion in Australia ended in August 2017, ending Aurion production after almost 11 years. With this, Toyota reintroduced, for the first time since 2006, the V6 Camry. Like the Aurion, the Camry also ceased production at the Altona factory, with an imported model from Japan coming to replace it.

== See also ==
- List of Toyota vehicles
