= AX =

An ax (or axe) is a tool or weapon.

AX, Ax, or ax may also refer to:

== Arts and entertainment ==
- Ax (manga)
- Ax (wrestler)
- Larry "The Ax" Hennig, another wrestler
- Anime Expo, an anime convention
- Aximili-Esgarrouth-Isthill, a fictional Animorphs character
- Ax, Ernie Colón's Marvel graphic novel
- Armani Exchange or A|X, fashion line
- Nippon TV, a Japanese television from its code sign "JOAX-DTV"

== Places ==
- Åland (ISO 3166-1 country code AX)
- Akrotiri and Dhekelia (FIPS 10-4 code AX)
- Ax-les-Thermes, a village in France

== Transportation ==
- Trans States Airlines (IATA code AX)
- Citroën AX, a French subcompact car

== Computing ==
- .ax, the Internet top-level domain of Åland
- AX register, a general-purpose 16-bit X86 register
- AX architecture, a Japanese computing initiative to allow PCs to handle Japanese text via special hardware
- Microsoft Dynamics AX, an enterprise resource planning tool
- IEEE 802.11ax, a standard for wireless local area networks, marketed as Wi-Fi 6

== People ==
- Ax (surname)

== See also ==
- Axe (disambiguation)
