= Gas Monkey Live =

Music venue in Dallas, Texas, 2014–2020

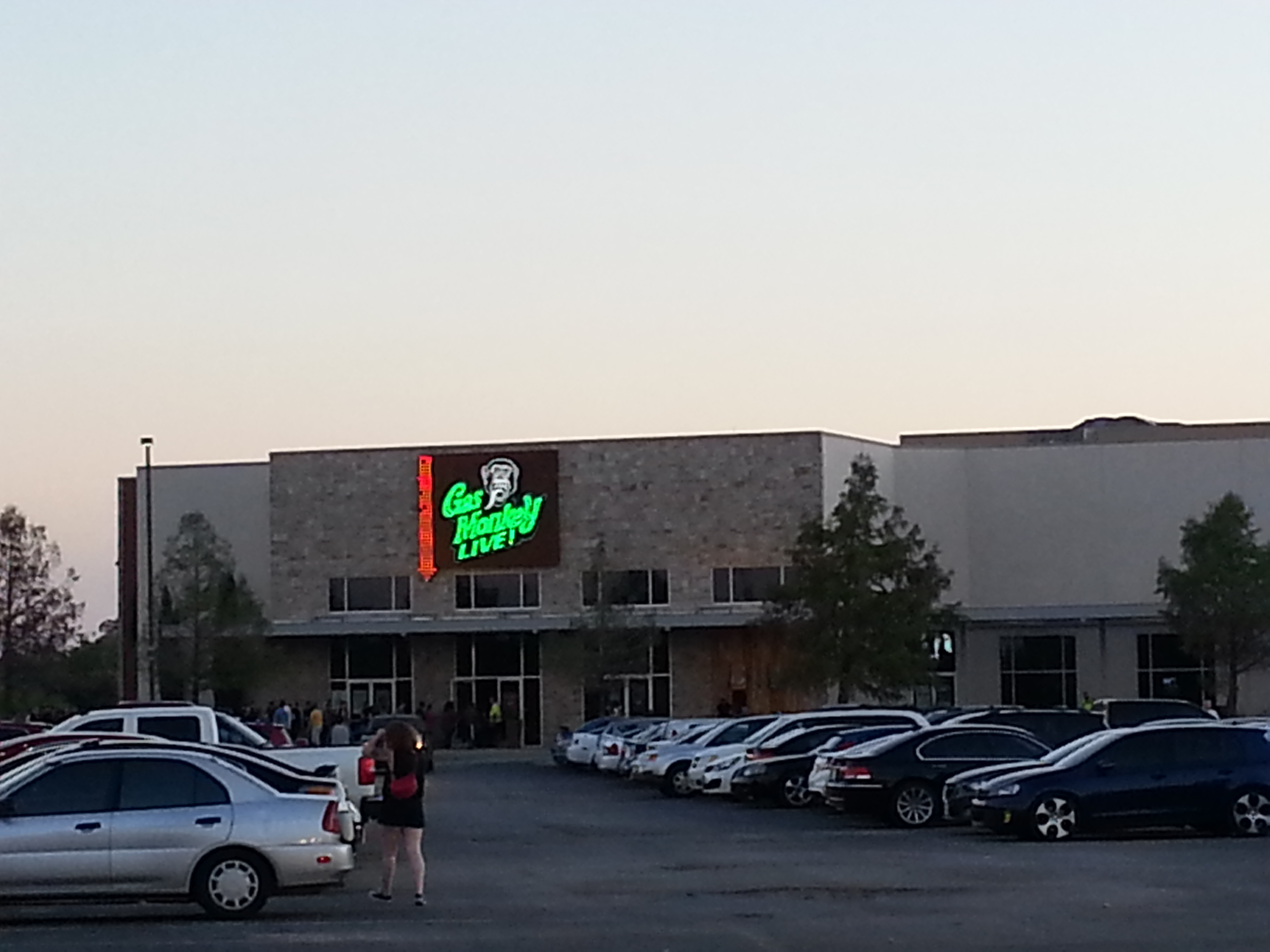
- Gas Monkey Live
- Interactive map of Gas Monkey Live
- Former names: Toby Keith's I Love This Bar & Grill
- Address: 10110 Technology Blvd East; Dallas, Texas 75220; United States
- Coordinates: 32.8577°N 96.8931°W
- Owner: Richard Rawlings
- Seating type: Standing and seating
- Capacity: 3000
- Type: Music venue
- Event: Various

Construction
- Opened: 11 October 2014
- Renovated: 2014
- Closed: 2020

Website
- Official website

Gas Monkey Live was an American music venue in Dallas, Texas, owned by Richard Rawlings, star of American television program Fast N' Loud and owner of both Gas Monkey Garage and Gas Monkey Bar N' Grill.

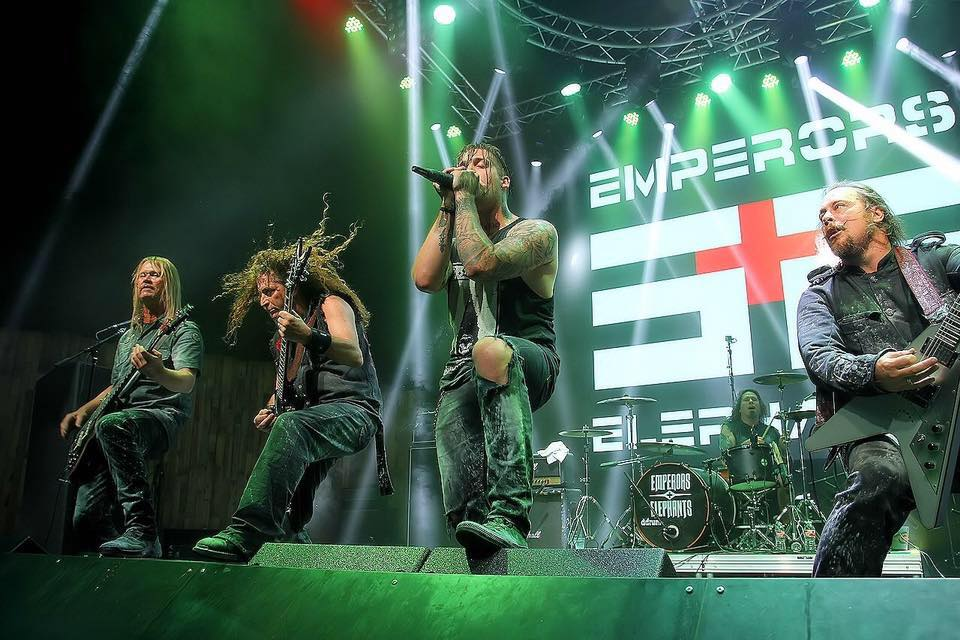
American hard rock band Emperors and Elephants from Chicago, Illinois performing at Gas Monkey Live

== History ==
On October 11, 2014, Rawlings, Alex Mendonsa (who ran the House of Blues Las Vegas), talent buyer Peter Ore (former Vice President of Talent Live Nation Denver) in addition to brothers Mike and Dan Flaherty of United Commercial Realty, started Gas Monkey Live at the location where the former Toby Keith's I Love This Bar & Grill was established in Northwest Dallas. With a footprint of 3,500 m^{2} (38,000 sq ft), the facility is used predominantly for live music and can hold up to 3000 people. American punk rock band Social Distortion performed at the location on opening day.

Midway through their "All Bad Things Must End" tour, American rock band Mötley Crüe started in November by working with Dodge for a free show named "Dodge Rocks Gas Monkey", which was restricted to only owners of Dodge Charger, Challenger and Viper vehicles. At the performance, Dodge presented the 2015 Dodge Charger SRT Hellcat as well as the 2015 Dodge Challenger SRT Hellcat.

In May 2020, the venue closed.
