= Eastern Hills High School =

Public school in Texas, United States

Coordinates: 32.7477°N 97.2326°W

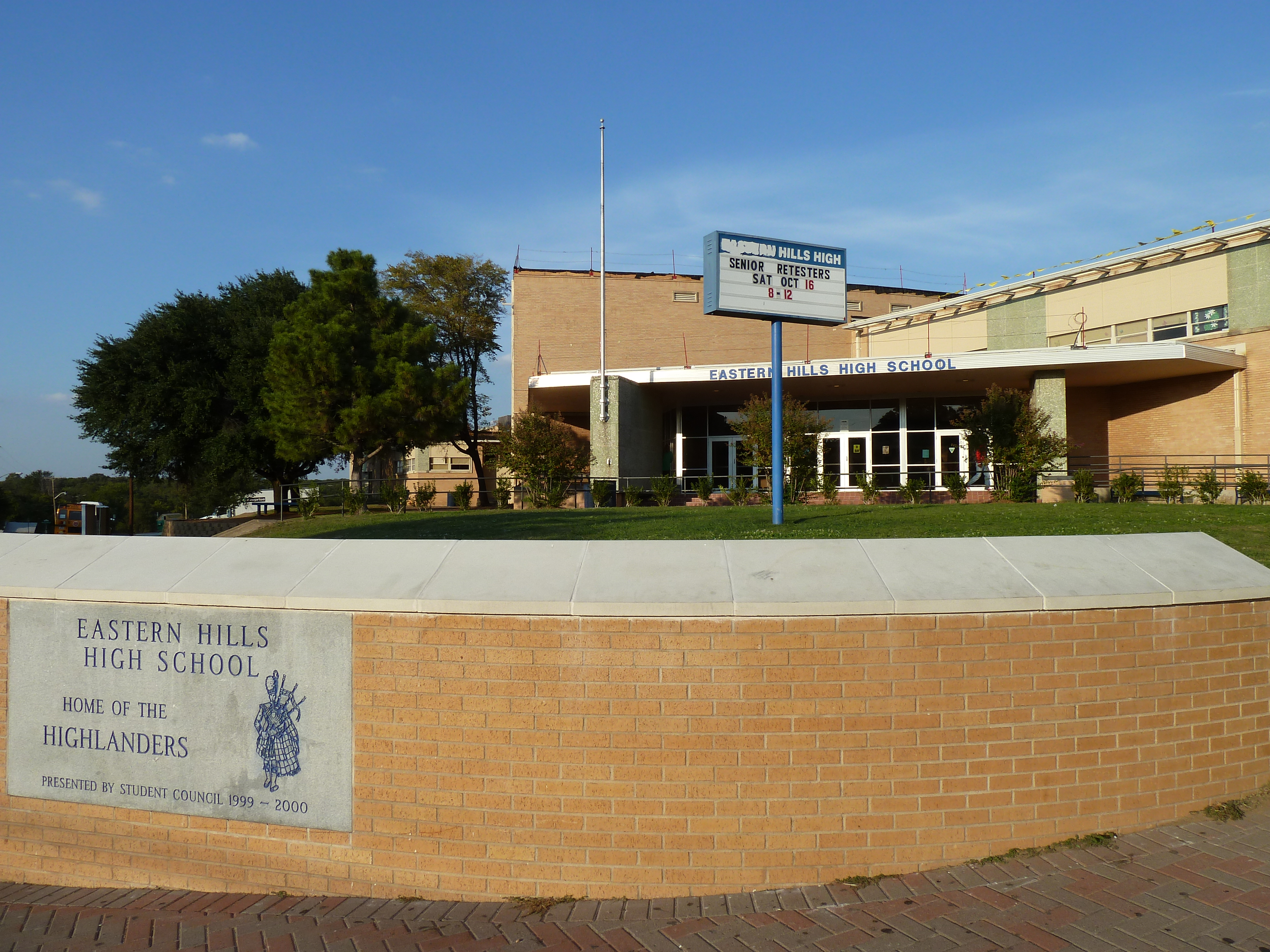
- Eastern Hills High School 2010
- 5701 Shelton; Fort Worth, Texas 76112

Information
- Type: Public high school
- Established: 1959
- School district: Fort Worth Independent School District
- Principal: Vacant
- Faculty: 87.56 (on FTE basis)
- Grades: 9–12
- Enrollment: 1,150 (as of 2017-18)
- Student to teacher ratio: 13.13
- Colors: Royal Blue, Gray, and White
- Mascot: Highlanders
- Website: www.fwisd.org/EasternHills

Eastern Hills High School is a four-year public high school in Fort Worth, Texas, United States. The school is educating students in grades 9–12, as part of the Fort Worth Independent School District. In an historical footnote, the band from the school played "Hail to the Chief" during President John F. Kennedy's visit to Dallas–Fort Worth in November 1963. EHHS is also the only school in the world with two Pulitizer Prize-winning photographers as alums -- "Skeeter" Hagler and Michael Ainsworth. The school has been recognized by the National Football League as part of its 50th Anniversary Super Bowl High School Honor Roll for serving as the home school for two former Super Bowl Players - Uwe von Schamann and Byron Chamberlain - as well as for Doug Hart, who played for the Green Bay Packers in Super Bowls I and II following graduation from EHHS's predecessor, Handley High School.

As of the 2014–15 school year, the school had an enrollment of 1,215 students and 96.2 classroom teachers (on a FTE basis, for a student-teacher ratio of 12.6:1.

== Academics ==
- EHHS offers three Gold Seal Program of Choice. EHHS is the site of Fire Science Technology, Law Enforcement and Legal Services. Under these new programs it is possible for a student to graduate high school with College credits, have EMT certification, and be able to receive up to a $50,000 salary in those respective careers.

== Bands ==
Highlander Bands Programs were notoriously featured and recognized under the direction of Mr. Charles E. Watts, Sr from the 1970’s thru 1994, for whom the current band hall is also named. Under his tutelage, many students matriculated and became successful, award-winning professional musicians as well as notable talents in many other careers including the field of education. The school's award-winning band was headed by Kathy Bernal, through 2013, when she retired. Ms. Bernal was selected as a Who's Who Among American Teachers for six consecutive years and received the Bayard H. Friedman for Teacher Excellence in Performing Arts for 2004–2005. The Jazz Band and Symphonic band regularly make tours abroad.

== Incidents ==
In September 1991, a 16-year-old student was stabbed and seriously injured in an incident related to gang rivalry between the students of Eastern Hills and Arlington Lamar High School. Officials of the school were accused of concealing evidence during the murder trial of one of the students in May 1996.

== Athletics ==
- Tracy Simien, former NFL linebacker for the Kansas City Chiefs, was the head football coach from 2011-20.
- Devvin Anderson, former Eastern Hills student, is the current head football coach since the 2021 season.

== Notable alumni ==
- Mitchell Benson (born 1967), football player who played in the NFL for the Indianapolis Colts and San Diego Chargers.
- Marcus Buckley (born 1971), football player who played for the New York Giants from 1993 to 1999
- Byron Chamberlain (born 1971), two-time Super Bowl winning football tight end for the Denver Broncos.
- Jack Graham, pastor of Prestonwood Baptist Church and past president of the Southern Baptist Convention
- Kay Granger, represents Texas's 12th congressional district and former Mayor of Fort Worth.
- Uwe von Schamann, placekicker for the Miami Dolphins, from 1979 to 1984.
- Allen Stanford, global financier convicted of defrauding billions from investors.
- Richard Rawlings (born 1969), star of Fast N' Loud, owner of Gas Monkey Bar N' Grill and Gas Monkey Garage
