= Fast N' Loud season 14 =

This is a list of episodes for Fast N' Loud Season 14. Season 14 started on March 4, 2018.

No. overall	No. in season	Title	Original release date	U.S. viewers (millions)
124	Special	"Team Gas Monkey"	April 3, 2018	N/A
Richard re-ignites the rivalry between Gas Monkey Garage and the Street Outlaws by challenging outlaw Ryan Martin to a drag race in his Demon Challenger.
125	1	"Dat Car"	March 13, 2018	N/A
Richard and the Monkeys partner up with SEMA Battle of the Builders finalist Big Mike to build Gas Monkey's first ever import tuner, a '75 Datsun 280Z.
126	2	"Tune It Up"	March 20, 2018	N/A
As the Monkeys and guest builder Big Mike race to get their '75 Datsun 280Z ready, a missing part may stop Richard from debuting Gas Monkeys first-ever tuner car at SEMA.
127	3	"Shining Up A '59 F-100"	March 27, 2018	N/A
When a big-name client wants Gas Monkey to build them a promotional vehicle on spec, Richard bets they'll take a shine to a custom '59 Ford F-100.
128	4	"Monkeying Around"	April 3, 2018	N/A
Get Revved Up with added facts and bonus scenes Richard and the Monkeys gather at the Monkey Trap along with their biggest fans to answer questions, share memorable moments, and revisit favorite builds like the 4x4 Camaro and Firebirds #1 and #2.
129	5	"Shiny And New"	April 10, 2018	N/A
Richard's gamble of building a '59 Ford F-100 on spec for Shiner Beer may payoff to the tune $150,000, but only if they like the final result.
130	6	"Trouble In The Galaxie"	April 17, 2018	N/A
Richard's plan for a straightforward upgrade on a '62 Ford Galaxie goes south when the Monkeys discover the worst body panel they've ever seen after it returns from sandblasting.
131	7	"Richard's Guide To The Galaxies"	April 24, 2018	N/A
A series of bad decisions on their '62 Galaxie build by the Monkeys could jeopardize Richard's plan to take it to auction.
132	8	"Bass Is Back"	May 1, 2018	N/A
Brian Bass rejoins the Gas Monkey crew as Richard plans to resurrect the iconic '92 Chevy 3500 Dually known as the "Krew Kut" in time to reveal it at the Lone Star Throwdown.
133	9	"The Cutting Krew"	May 8, 2018	N/A
Richard's plan to reveal the Krew Kut Dually at the Lone Star Throwdown hits a snag when rain forces him to come up with a new plan to re-introduce it to its fans.
