= Misfit Garage =

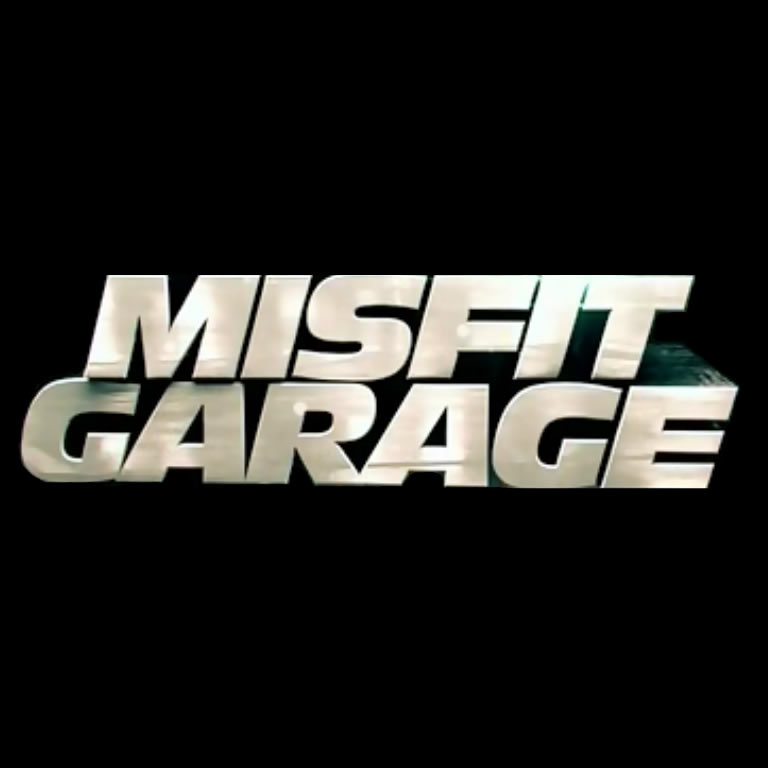
- Genre: Reality
- Starring: Thomas Weeks; Tom Smith; Jordan Butler; Scot McMillan; Rodney "Popeye" Richardson; John Klump; Kevin Clark; Josh Paris
- Country of origin: United States
- Original language: English
- No. of seasons: 6
- No. of episodes: 48

Production
- Running time: 60 minutes
- Production company: Pilgrim Studios

Original release
- Network: Discovery Channel
- Release: October 13, 2014 – August 16, 2018

Related
- Fast N' Loud

Misfit Garage was a Discovery Channel reality-television show spun off from Fast N' Loud. It featured two of the mechanics fired from that show's Dallas, Texas-based Gas Monkey Garage, Tom Smith and Jordan Butler, as well as Thomas Weeks and Scot McMillan, who together start a new company, Fired Up Garage. The series, which premiered October 13, 2014, was produced by Pilgrim Studios, with Craig Piligian, Richard Rawlings and Eddie Rohwedder as executive producers, and Craig Coffman additionally serving as executive producer for the Discovery Channel. Episodes are sporadically shown on the Discovery Turbo channel.

== Series overview ==
Season	Episodes	Originally aired		Average rating (millions)
Season	Episodes	Season premiere	Season finale	Average rating (millions)
1	8	Oct. 13, 2014	Dec. 1, 2014	1.33
2	8	Mar. 23, 2015	May 11, 2015	NA
3	8	Mar. 7, 2016	Apr 25, 2016	NA
4	8	Jul. 11, 2016	Aug 27, 2016	NA

== Episodes ==
=== Season 1 ===
Season one started on October 13, 2014.

No. overall	No. in season	Title	Original release date	US viewers (millions)
1	1	"Fired Up About A Chevelle Part 1"	October 13, 2014	1.491
"Fired Up Garage" goes to work on a ’67 Chevelle. The team also enters a demolition derby for publicity, running into former co-workers of the shop they were all fired from by Richard Rawlings and who they later find out is their new shop landlord.
2	2	"Fired Up About A Chevelle Part 2"	October 20, 2014	1.517
'Fired Up Garage' struggles to deal with 'landlord' Richard Rawlings, as well as the completion of their first major build. Will the amazing ’67 Chevelle redo put "Fired Up Garage" on the map, ready to go toe-to-toe with Richard and "Gas Monkey Garage".
3	3	"Jazzed About A '57 Gasser Part 1"	October 27, 2014	1.356
Thomas makes a profit flipping a car Richard turned his nose up at. Meanwhile, Thomas and Scot pick up solid a ’57 Chevy for their next build. Later, the shop is threatened when a tree falls on it, ruining their office and crushing a customer's truck.
4	4	"Jazzed About A '57 Gasser Part 2"	November 3, 2014	1.433
Richard surprises FU garage with a rundown trailer as a replacement office. Scot has a buyer for the ’57 gasser and gives the crew a two-week deadline, but things come to a halt after Thomas builds an engine that's unacceptable with the other partners.
5	5	"Furious ’65 Fastback Part 1"	November 10, 2014	1.143
The Misfits open house is shut down by Richard Rawlings. Thomas picks up a rare Ford Torino Cobra. Up a creek without a project car, the team hastily buys a ’65 Mustang fastback. Meanwhile, Thomas finds a ’69 Barracuda that he allows Tom to fix.
6	6	"Furious ’65 Fastback Part 2"	November 17, 2014	1.448
The mustang comes back from paint and the guys get to work. A trip to Gas Monkey to use a tool costs them extra money when Richard catches them and invoices them. Things take a bigger turn for the worse when Soupbone gets white paint on the hood.
7	7	"One, Nasty Nova Part 1"	November 24, 2014	0.921
Thomas flips two classic cars that turn a quick profit: a ’53 Mercury and a ’58 Ford Fairlane. Thomas and Scot pick up a’65 Chevy Nova that Scot's dad did all the engine work on, but Corbett goes rogue and paints the car charcoal grey instead of white. Future partner Kevin Clark makes an appearance on Misfit Garage and buys a $2500 project car from Thomas.
8	8	"One, Nasty Nova Part 2"	December 1, 2014	1.299
Moving forward after a surprise on the paint job, the Misfits hit a bump in the road when the axle they chopped and fabricated isn’t the right size. Thomas lands a ’31 dodge rat rod he turns for profit. Scot's dad pays a visit to tune the '65 Nova motor.

=== Season 2 ===
Season two started on March 23, 2015.

No. overall	No. in season	Title	Original release date	US viewers (millions)
9	1	"Flipped for a '69 Chevy Shortbed, Part I"	March 23, 2015	N/A
The guys attempt a truck project but run into major setbacks with the cab and bed. Later, Thomas makes a decision about a '59 Oldsmobile. Scot McMillan brings home a rooster that Tom names Little Richard.
10	2	"Flipped for a '69 Chevy Shortbed, Part II"	March 30, 2015	N/A
The garage must deal with the aftermath of the demolished '69 Chevy pickup; Jordan and Tom search for a replacement cab; Thomas tries to flip a '59 Oldsmobile.
11	3	"A Rusty, Crusty '67 Camaro, Part I"	April 6, 2015	N/A
A '67 Camaro is brought into the garage for restoration that creates tension between some of the team members.
12	4	"A Rusty, Crusty '67 Camaro, Part II"	April 13, 2015	N/A
After Scot and Austin quit due to creative differences on the Camaro, the guys recruit Kevin Clark and John Klump to help. Thomas and Tom consider a '73 Firebird.
13	5	"A '31 Ford Hot Rod and '71 Holy Grail Cuda"	April 20, 2015	N/A
Tom and Thomas purchase a '31 Ford Model A frame. Since the car is basically just a shell, they'll need new doors and many parts in order to build it out. Meanwhile, Jordan suggests they take a look at a '71 Cuda. Thomas also flips a '68 Mustang.
14	6	"The '71 Holy Grail Cuda/Goodbye Little Richard"	April 27, 2015	N/A
While the guys work on tearing down the '71 Cuda, Scot and Austin arrive to see if the Fired Up guys need any assistance, since they've got two big projects on their hands. Thomas and Tom flip a '51 Chevy truck. Tom also says goodbye to Little Richard.
15	7	"The Race to Finish the '71 Holy Grail Cuda"	May 4, 2015	N/A
The guys from 'Fired Up' lend a hand with the '71 Cuda.
16	8	"Revving up the '31 Ford Hotrod"	May 11, 2015	N/A
The '31 Ford build has been at a stand still until the necessary parts finally arrive and the build can move forward, but Kevin makes a big mistake while working on the '31 Ford. Later, Thomas buys Richard a '71 Cuda

=== Season 3 ===
Season three started March 7, 2016.

No. overall	No. in season	Title	Original release date	US viewers (millions)
17	1	"Launching a '69 Satellite, Part 1"	March 7, 2016	N/A
The "Fired Up Garage" guys buy their next build: a '69 Plymouth Satellite to turn it into a racer with a 750-hp big block 440 engine. Thomas Weeks has his eyes on a '32 Ford Five-Window Body owned by Richard Rawlings.
18	2	"Launching a '69 Satellite, Part 2"	March 14, 2016	N/A
The "Fired Up team attempts to finish the 1969 Plymouth Satellite after flaring tempers lead to a blow-up between Tom & Thomas. Thomas and Kevin are having a bad day pickin' and are about to call it quits, until they come across a 1954 Ford F100.
19	3	"Crushed GTO and Chopped '41 Ford"	March 28, 2016	N/A
Tom & Thomas buy a '71 Pontiac GTO and it quickly becomes apparent that much of the body is rusted. Thomas visits Gas Monkey Garage looking to make a purchase from Richard. The Fired up team buys a '41 Ford from a friend and make it their next big build.
20	4	"Crushed GTO and Chopped '41 Ford, Part 2"	March 21, 2016	N/A
The "Fired Up Garage" team teaches Thomas a lesson by taking the 1971 GTO to a field and crushing it with a tank. Thomas buys a 1941 Ford to turn it into a flaming blue hot rod as well as a food truck to kick start the dream of a Fired Up Garage empire!
21	5	"57' Corvette"	April 4, 2016	N/A
Thomas Weeks & Tom Smith get a'57 Corvette for a bargain & help Sue Yu-Lan Martin purchase a '56 Ford Truck that the "Fired Up Garage" will rebuild. Tom's food truck arrives. Soupbone fails to order the parts in time and a new team member is hired to replace him.
22	6	"57' Corvette, Part 2"	April 11, 2016	N/A
Soup Bone fails to get parts in time and pays the price. After weeks of delays the Misfits finish the '57 Corvette and look for a big payday. Richard Rawlings casts doubts on whether the guys can make it a go with their Food Truck.
23	7	"Sue's Custom '56 Ford"	April 18, 2016	N/A
Having sold the '57 Corvette for $80,000 the guys start on Sue Yu-Lan Martin's '56 Ford truck. The truck takes over 3 weeks to paint & Tom Smith has overspent, so he flips a '55 Dodge Royal Lancer, flips the '64 Thunderbird, & even asks Sue for an advance.
24	8	"Sue's Custom '56 Ford, Part 2"	April 25, 2016	N/A
Thomas and Tom pick up a rusted but original '67 Chevelle to flip for money towards Sue Yu-Lan's Martin's '56 Ford truck. Sue gets angry with the length of the build and threatens to turn the project over to Richard Rawlings.

=== Season 4 ===
Season four started on July 11, 2016

No. overall	No. in season	Title	Original release date	US viewers (millions)
25	1	"Guardian of the Galaxie"	July 11, 2016	N/A
A theft at the FU Garage leaves the team shorthanded while working on Sue's truck. Later, a Ford Galaxie project is started and tensions in the garage force one of the crew to quit.
26	2	"Galaxie Quest: Barrett Jackson"	July 18, 2016	N/A
John Klump helps the team prepare for the Barrett-Jackson auction.
27	3	"Wrestling with Disaster"	July 25, 2016	N/A
A rusty 1961 Ford Econoline is worked on. Later, Tom searches for a famous Mexican Luchador named Blue Demon Jr.
28	4	"Truckin' It with Trejo"	August 1, 2016	N/A
Actor Danny Trejo considers buying the Econoline. Later, Tom talks to a legendary Latino wrestler.
29	5	"The Original Rum Runner"	August 8, 2016	N/A
Thom and Tom travel to Georgia where they meet up with Nascar driver Bill Elliot and check out a '40 Ford Tudor sedan for a rebuild project.
30	6	"Booze in the Hood"	August 15, 2016	N/A
The '40 Ford Moonshine Runner project continues. Also, Thomas buys a '60 Cadillac from an old friend.
31	7	"Klump in the Road"	August 22, 2016	N/A
The guys attempt to rebuild a 1959 Chevy El Camino that is in poor condition.
32	8	"What Klump?"	August 27, 2016	N/A
A 1959 Chevy El Camino is rebuilt but the project might be too much for John Klump.
