= Fast N' Loud season 1 =

Season 1 of Fast N' Loud started on June 6, 2012, and ended on December 8, 2012, for a total of 14 episodes. Season 1 was filmed on location on Reeder Road in Dallas, Texas, in a shop building rented from Phipps Auto, which was also featured in the show. The Gas Monkey Garage crew worked in the back shop, while Rawlings brought Corvettes, Cadillacs, and other cars that were going to be "quick flips" to Dewaine Phipps to get them running again. Gas Monkey Garage also had an ongoing business relationship with Sue Martin, a successful Taiwanese immigrant, at ASM Auto Upholstery, a business that was literally within car-pushing distance of their shop. KC Mathieu, a long-time friend of Kaufman's and owner of KC's Paint Shop, is part of the regular GMG crew and the painter for Gas Monkey Garage. Another heavily featured member of the Gas Monkey Garage crew during Season 1 was Scot McMillan Jr., of Scot Rods Garage, who left at the end of Season 1 to work at his own shop. During Season 1, Rawlings also hired an office assistant named Christie Brimberry, who makes repeated appearances on the show. The final two episodes of the season are not available for streaming on Discovery+.

== Episodes ==
No. overall	No. in season	Title	Original release date	U.S. viewers (millions)
1	1	"Model A Madness"	June 6, 2012	0.97
Richard and Aaron find the hot rod of their dreams: a rust-free 1931 Model A. As renovation costs pile up, Richard looks to make some fast cash with a couple of quick flips, including the "Drive Angry" Buick Riviera and a Chevy 210.
2	2	"Awesome Aussies & Olds"	June 13, 2012	1.37
Richard and Aaron find a '55 Chevy Bel Air as well as a 1950 Oldsmobile Rocket 88 coupe, which had been perfectly preserved in a garage for over 50 years. They have 48 hours to fix up a broken-down '73 Caddy convertible for two Aussies hitting Route 66.
3	3	"Monkey Business Dragster"	June 20, 2012	1.39
Richard and Aaron stumble upon a diamond in the rough: a 1960s Gasser that Richard wants to race. They buy a gleaming '32 Pontiac at a swap meet. And is a friend's 1960 Cadillac Sedan De Ville haunted and cursing the garage?
4	4	"Double-Trouble Galaxy"	June 27, 2012	1.39
Richard and Aaron scramble to get a replacement '64 Galaxie ready for auction after the first one they find turns out to be in much rougher shape than expected. They have to get creative to get a stuck 1949 F-1 Ford off the back of a large car hauler.
5	5	"Low-Riding Lincoln"	July 11, 2012	1.45
Richard and Aaron turn the granddaddy of big cars, a 1970 Lincoln Continental Mark III, into a muscle car and bring a '68 Ford pickup back to life. Richard scoops up a 1970s style hot rod kit car with a mysterious past.
6	6	"Frankensteined Ford"	July 18, 2012	1.50
The Gas Monkey guys "frankenstein" together a '68 Ford F-100 truck by blending together two vehicles that shouldn't go together. Richard relives his youth with a '77 Trans Am Firebird. He flips a '67 Caddy convertible to an international buyer.
7	7	"Amazing Impala"	September 3, 2012	1.91
Richard, Aaron and the Gas Monkey crew unbury a '64 Impala buried in 10 years of debris and bring it back to life. A 1951 Bruco Fire Truck sparks former firefighter Richard's fancy as does a 1955 Caddy Coupe de Ville nicknamed Dolly.
8	8	"'48 Chevy Fleet"	September 10, 2012	0.90
Richard, Aaron, and the Gas Monkey crew try to "knock the ugly outta" a '48 Chevy Fleetmaster. Richard makes a profit but still gets schooled on a '74 Corvette. It's a tough Oklahoma crowd at the auction for their Chevy and "Scarface"-worthy '63 Caddy.
9	9	"Ramshackle Rambler"	September 17, 2012	1.50
The Gas Monkey crew revives a rust-and-rat filled 59 Rambler to make it SoCal surf-worthy once again. Richard haggles for a 31 Model A. His new Willys Coupe Gasser could be worth $200K if Richard can prove its connection to a legendary drag racing team.
10	10	"One-of-a-Kind Woodill"	September 24, 2012	1.38
The Gas Monkey crew have to handle a rare, fragile and flammable fiberglass-bodied Woodill Wildfire with kid gloves if they're going to make a six-figure sale. The boys take in a Harley and then blow off steam by entering Richard in the Demolition Derby.
11	11	"Fast & Furious Fairmont"	October 1, 2012	1.44
Richard stretches Gas Monkey's style and Aaron's skills by making an "ugly" 1978 Ford Fairmont into a cool, mirrored drift car. Richard flips a rare 1967 Corvette Stingray complete with tank sticker and bets his driving skills to sell the shop truck.
12	12	"Holy Grail Hot Rod"	October 8, 2012	1.65
Richard and Aaron pick up a very rare 32 Ford 3-window, but buying it is about all they can agree upon. They can't agree on how to freshen up a 1964 Econoline van for their "Swag Wagon" either. But they can agree a gifted 1989 Shelby pickup has got to go!
13	13	"Apache • Road to Chopper Live, Part 1"	December 3, 2012	1.30
14	14	"Apache • Road to Chopper Live, Part 2"	December 10, 2012	1.91
In this two-part show, The Gas Monkeys are invited to the biker build off against Paul Snr, Paul Jnr and Jessie James.
