= Fast N' Loud season 3 =

Season 3 of Fast N' Loud premiered on June 10, 2013, as Richard Rawlings and mechanical prodigy Aaron Kaufman once again search for classic cars. This season they conjure up a plan to transform a vintage '71 Dodge Scat Pack Challenger bought at auction. Their grand scheme turns into a mechanical challenge that Aaron and his team have never seen the likes of before. Meanwhile, Richard invests in a new live venue space across from the Grill and is nervous he's going to have to spend every last dollar he has to do it. The mechanics also bring back to life a '57 Shorty School bus.

== Episodes ==
| No. overall | No. in season | Title | Original release date | U.S. viewers (millions) |
|---|---|---|---|---|
| 22 | 1 | "Ferrari Fix, Part 1" | June 10, 2013 | 1.92 |
| 23 | 2 | "Ferrari Fix, Part 2" | June 17, 2013 | 2.58 |
In this two-part show, Richard and business partner Dennis Collins buy a wrecked red Ferrari F40 for $400,000 then spend $295,000 to paint it black and upgrade it with modern technology. Dennis buys the finished car for his collection.
| 24 | 3 | "No Bull Bonneville" | June 24, 2013 | 2.29 |
Richard has 72 hours to prepare a ’59 Bonneville for the road-tripping Aussies, nicknaming it the Keagle (Kangaroo-Eagle).
| 25 | 4 | "Dodge Hodge Podge, Part 1" | July 1, 2013 | 2.25 |
| 26 | 5 | "Dodge Hodge Podge, Part 2" | July 8, 2013 | 2.58 |
In this two-part episode, Richard and Aaron buy and rebuild a ’64 Dodge Sweptline pickup truck.
| 27 | 6 | "Ford Galaxie, Part 1 • Bikini Contest" | July 15, 2013 | 1.86 |
| 28 | 7 | "Ford Galaxie, Part 2 • Nash Healey" | July 22, 2013 | 2.27 |
In this two-part episode, Richard and Aaron go to Roswell for a '67 Ford Galaxie, then Richard goes to Los Angeles to pick up more cars. The owner of Twin Peaks Restaurants invites them to Denver, Colorado, to be judges in a bikini contest.
| 29 | 8 | "Beards, Builds and Beers" | July 29, 2013 | 1.93 |
The team revisits the cars they flipped and answer fan mail.
