= Fast N' Loud season 13 =

This is a list of episodes for Fast N' Loud Season 13. Season 13 started on October 16, 2017.

No. overall	No. in season	Title	Original release date	U.S. viewers (millions)
116	1	"Step Vanning Into a New Era"	October 16, 2017	N/A
It's the beginning of a new era at Gas Monkey Garage as Richard puts the Monkeys in charge of hot-rodding a '73 Chevy P30 Step Van for their first big build without Aaron.
117	2	"Cruisin' for a Bruisin'"	October 23, 2017	N/A
As the Monkeys race to finish their first big build without Aaron, Richard tries to unload his '65 Shelby Mustang GT with a frozen engine.
118	3	"All About the Bass"	October 30, 2017	N/A
Richard brings in Gas Monkey's first ever guest builder as Dallas hot-rodder Brian Bass teams up with the Monkeys to build a '60's style hot rod out of a '34 Ford Coupe.
119	4	"Bad Bass"	November 6, 2017	N/A
As the Monkeys and guest builder Brian Bass go over schedule on their '34 Ford Coupe, Richard strikes a deal to feature the car in Hot Rod Magazine if it can be finished in time.
120	Special	"All About the Bad Bass"	November 9, 2017	N/A
121	5	"Busch vs. Logano"	November 13, 2017	N/A
After 2017 Daytona 500 winner Kurt Busch makes a surprise visit to Gas Monkey, Richard strikes a deal to build him a '72 Pantera to race against fellow NASCAR champion Joey Logano.
122	6	"The Race: Busch vs. Logano"	November 20, 2017	N/A
Richard and the Monkeys push to finish Kurt Busch's custom '72 Pantera in time for his grudge race against fellow NASCAR superstar Joey Logano and his Factory 5 Shelby Daytona.
123	Special	"Fast N' Loud's First Build"	February 14, 2018	N/A
