= Racing game =

Racing game or race game may refer to:

- Racing video game, a type of video game
- Race game, a type of board game
- Slot car racing
- Race Game, a pricing game from The Price is Right
- Racing game, a type of electro-mechanical driving game

== See also ==
- Racetrack (game), a paper and pencil game that simulates a car race
- Racing, a sport or competition of speed
- Racing (disambiguation)
- Race Against Time (disambiguation)
