= Fast N' Loud season 4 =

In the fourth season of the hit series Fast N' Loud, Richard Rawlings and Aaron Kaufman travel the back roads, searching barns and open fields for that one rare ride to restore, and choosing the right car is the trick. Rawlings is the man with the eye, the gift for seeing that rare find; while Kaufman is the master mechanic who decides whether or not these relics are too far gone or the perfect basis for an overhaul at the Gas Monkey Garage. Once Rawlings wheels and deals for a good price, it's back to the Garage to set the design plan and begin the major teardown. Then, the major work begins, but time is money and the quicker they finish their cars, the quicker they can get them to auction.

== Episodes ==
No. overall	No. in season	Title	Original release date	U.S. viewers (millions)
30	1	"Dale Jr.'s Sick Nomad"	September 2, 2013	2.69
NASCAR's Dale Earnhardt Jr. asks for a custom-built car for a road trip vacation. The crew rebuilds a ’56 Chevy Nomad in record time and delivers it to his Mooresville, North Carolina estate.
31	2	"Chopped Cabriolet and 'Vette Rescue"	September 9, 2013	2.17
A widow sells her husband's Ford ’32 Cabriolet, the team rebuilds a ’62 Corvette.
32	3	"Cool Customline"	September 16, 2013	2.63
KC's upgraded ’55 Ford Customline is flipped to Mark Cuban. George Foreman visits the garage while Richard and Dennis are out to buy 2 Nash Healey cars and a ’38 Aston Martin.
33	4	"Killer COPO Camaro"	October 14, 2013	2.02
Richard builds a COPO Camaro while Aaron builds his dream motorcycle.
34	5	"Caddy Rust Bucket • Bel Air Beauty, Part 1"	October 21, 2013	2.20
35	6	"Caddy Rust Bucket • Bel Air Beauty, Part 2"	October 28, 2013	2.21
In this two-part episode, Richard buys $38,500 worth of cars. Included is a ’49 classic convertible and ’68 Cadillac Coupe de Ville, which is so rusted out the Gas Monkey crew threatens mutiny. The crew then tries to recoup their losses with a ’60 Bel Air.
36	7	"Flugtag Flyer • Wicked Wayfarer"	November 4, 2013	2.06
GMG takes wing! Aaron builds a flying machine for the Red Bull Flugtag event and the team launches him off a 30-foot pier. But will the Gas Monkey Flying Circus take off or take a nose dive? Meanwhile, the crew brings a rare 1950 Dodge Wayfarer back to life.
37	8	"'71 Cool Kingswood • Retro Replicar"	November 11, 2013	2.67
Aaron and crew turn an ugly duckling ’71 Kingswood station wagon into the cool, 70s hot rod dragster it was meant to be. Richard pries an ’80 MG Replicar from a husband reluctant to part with it. The Gas Monkey Bar N' Grill books its first celebrity musical act.
38	9	"Shelby Rent-A-Racer Restore, Part 1"	November 18, 2013	2.21
The crew takes on a ’68 Shelby Mustang that looks sweet but what's it hiding? Richard flips his lid when Tom and Jordan buy two junker cars from two tourists. Richard and KC travel to a secret lair to make a deal on a Lotus Cortina and a rare Model 770 Amphicar amphibious car.
39	10	"Shelby Rent-A-Racer Restore, Part 2"	November 25, 2013	2.64
Engine issues plague the ’68 Shelby Mustang. Richard flips the rare ’66 Lotus Cortina and the floating Amphicar for some fast cash. A classic Ford Falcon arrives at the garage—and selling it would be icing on the cake.
40	11	"Gas Monkey Bandit Car, Part 1"	December 2, 2013	2.66
Richard and the Gas Monkey crew upgrade a 1977 TransAm for $70,000 plus a potential $65,000 bonus. Guest stars include Burt Reynolds (The Bandit from Smokey and the Bandit) and Paul Williams (Little Enos).
41	12	"Gas Monkey Bandit Car, Part 2"	December 9, 2013	3.17
Richard races to deliver the completed 1977 TransAm to a friend of his in New Orleans, with a $50,000 wager riding on delivering the car on time.
42	13	"Troll’s Choice Rolls-Royce"	January 27, 2014	2.61
When Richard "accidentally" buys $92K worth of cars at an auction, his bookkeeper sister Daphne insists he flip all five cars in one week. Some go more easily and profitably than others but it's a weirdly built Rolls Royce that even Aaron has a hard time fixing.
