= Fast N' Loud season 7 =

This is a list of episodes for Fast N' Loud Season 7.

No. overall	No. in season	Title	Original release date	U.S. viewers (millions)
60	1	"The Shorty Short VW Bus"	October 13, 2014	1.700
When Richard buys a ’66 VW Type 1 Transporter, none of the Gas Monkeys really knows the mechanics of Volkswagens; and it is transformed into a micro-mini-midget Microbus. Later, when Richard and Aaron discover that the Fired Up Garage is attending a demolition derby, Richard has a trick up his sleeve to send his former employees reeling.
61	2	"One Cool Impala"	October 20, 2014	1.703
When Richard buys a ’65 Chevy Impala, they put their Gas Monkey spin on it. Richard and Aaron score a ‘34 Five Window Ford. Later, Richard agrees to cool off the Monkeys with new air conditioning, but the Fired Up Garage crew gets hot and bothered about it.
62	3	"Big, Bad C-10 Build, Part 1"	October 27, 2014	1.738
Richard and Aaron build their coolest hot rod, a 1976 Chevy C-10 short bed show truck to be auctioned at the Cattle Baron’s Ball. Plus, Richard misses out on a Firebird thanks to Thomas Weeks, and a '65 Cadillac is on the lot for one of Richard’s buyers.
63	4	"Big, Bad C-10 Build, Part 2"	November 3, 2014	2.115
The plan to build Gas Monkey’s coolest show truck continues as Richard hopes to deliver a 1976 Chevy C-10 to the Cattle Baron’s Ball. Meanwhile, Richard tries to flip a ‘66 Continental and a ‘51 Caddy. Also, Richard stops by Fired Up Garage to check on the rent.
64	5	"NHRA and a '55 Pink Caddy, Part 1"	November 10, 2014	1.674
When Richard gets a deal to build a ’55 Pink Cadillac for a hundred grand, it seems like a sweet deal ... until the Gas Monkeys relay that they may not be able to build the car in time for the tight deadline. Meanwhile, Richard invests in sponsoring an NHRA team.
65	6	"NHRA and a '55 Pink Caddy, Part 2"	November 17, 2014	2.145
After a constant wait for parts for the ’55 Pink Caddy, the monkeys make a mad dash to get the car done on time. Meanwhile, Richard ventures into new territory as his Gas Monkey Dragster hits the Texas Motorplex for the NHRA qualifying runs.
66	Special	"Turkey Day Disasters"	November 24, 2014	N/A
Fails are on the menu for this special Thanksgiving episode of Demolition Theater. Richard, Aaron and the Gas Monkey crew witness a Thanksgiving prank that sends a family’s dinner flying. And, in tonight’s montage, it’s attack of the Turkey!
67	Special	"Party on Wreck Street"	December 1, 2014	0.951
Richard, Aaron, and the crew of Gas Monkey Garage share some of the craziest viral videos. An exploding whale makes a huge mess, a roof-to-truck jumper hits the ground instead, and a driver walks away unharmed from one of the most gnarly race car crashes.
68	7	"Don't Hassle the Hoff • Pontiac Trans Am, Part 1"	December 8, 2014	1.702
When an old friend of Richard's offers him $200,000 for a Knight Rider KITT car and a bonus if he can get David Hasselhoff to appear at his 40th birthday party, Richard can't pass up the offer. He sets out not only to find an 80's Trans Am, but the Hoff.
69	8	"Don't Hassle the Hoff • Pontiac Trans Am, Part 2"	December 8, 2014	1.777
It's a race against time as the Monkeys rush to finish the KITT car. Richard's on edge because he's worried that he and Aaron might not make it to the Las Vegas birthday party with the car by the deadline. They also don't know if the Hoff will show up.
70	Special	"Catastrophic Failure"	December 15, 2014	0.654
Richard and Aaron are joined by the king of nutshots and a couple of stock car hot shots. Also, a world record attempt sends one car into a dangerous nosedive, a biker flips into a bulldozer, and a motorcycle accident sends a rider flying 80 feet.
71	Special	"Happy, Hospital Holidays"	December 22, 2014	N/A
It's beginning to look a lot like Christmas at Gas Monkey Garage. Richard is joined in studio by his friends from "Street Outlaws" as they celebrate the season with a Christmas list of the craziest videos. Tom Smith from Misfits Garage also stops by.
72	Special	"Outlaws All Over"	December 29, 2014	1.529
Richard has invited his friends Farmtruck and Azn from "Street Outlaws" to check out his favorite viral videos. A double decker car flip is almost a huge flop. A man attaches a string to himself with a staple gun. And don't miss the clip of the week...
73	Special	"Appetite for Destruction"	January 5, 2015	1.199
Richard, Aaron and their friends from Gas Monkey Garage view viral videos as cars crash, heads bash, and trains smash! Flames are flying as fireworks explode and a fire department training exercise goes wrong. Also, A drone hits a groom in the face.
74	Special	"Misfit in the Making"	January 12, 2015	N/A
Richard and ex- Gas Monkey employee/star of Misfit Garage, Tom Smith, are on the hunt for the best viral videos. A motorcycle driver is caught in a flash flood. Also, a cyclist crashes at 107 miles per hour. And a senior stops a robbery in progress with purse power.
