= Fast N' Loud season 12 =

This is a list of episodes for Fast N' Loud Season 12. Season 12 started on January 16, 2017.

No. overall	No. in season	Title	Original release date	U.S. viewers (millions)
105	1	"Million Dollar Monkey"	January 16, 2017	N/A
Aaron heads to Pikes Peak, while the guys build a 1955 Chevy that Richard plans to sell at a Barrett-Jackson auction on the East Coast.
106	2	"Opening Bid"	January 23, 2017	N/A
Richard prepares for auction at Barrett-Jackson, but last-minute problems with his '55 Chevy may prevent him from taking it to auction.
107	3	"When Lightning Strikes"	January 30, 2017	N/A
Banking on a speedy build because of all the aftermarket parts available for G-body cars, Aaron bets Richard he can finish a 1980 El Camino in three weeks instead of four.
108	4	"Spinning Their Hot Wheels"	February 4, 2017	N/A
Hot Wheels challenges Richard and Aaron to build a life-sized car to possibly become part of their exclusive Red Line Club; and Aaron reveals his choice for the build is a 1963 Ford Econoline truck.
109	5	"Hot Wheels of Fortune"	January 3, 2017	N/A
Aaron believes the Ford Ecoline truck will end up a Red Line Club car; and Richard gives Aaron an unlimited budget to build the car in order to be ready to unveil at a big Hot Wheels Red Line Club party.
110	6	"La Casa Del Camino"	February 6, 2017	N/A
After Aaron bets Richard that the guys would be able to finish building a 1980 El Camino one week ahead of schedule, last-minute problems threaten to push them past their deadline.
111	7	"Buggin' Out"	February 13, 2017	N/A
With Aaron set to take off soon for a long-deserved vacation, he and Richard get the guys started on giving the proper treatment to a '65 Volkswagen Beetle.
112	8	"The Vomit Comet"	February 20, 2017	N/A
With Aaron on vacation, Richard tasks the guys with giving the Gas Monkey treatment to the first car he ever owned back in high school, a vomit green '74 Mercury Comet.
113	9	"100 Monkeys"	February 20, 2017	N/A
Richard and Aaron host a star-studded party to celebrate the past, present and future of Gas Monkey Garage.
114	10	"Bye Bye Beardy"	February 27, 2017	N/A
Aaron tells Richard he is quitting Gas Monkey just as Richard agrees to a drag strip showdown with Big Chief from Street Outlaws. The Monkeys are stuck to build a race car on their own at the same time he's challenged to his own race against another set of Outlaws.
115	11	"Vs. Street Outlaws: Build to Mega Race Part II"	February 27, 2017	N/A
Conclusion. With race day against the "Street Outlaws" fast approaching, Aaron struggles to get his BMW ready on his own, while Richard faces potential disaster when the challenger crashes on its final test run.
