= Fast N' Loud season 5 =

This is a list of episodes for the fifth season of the television series Fast N' Loud.

== Episodes ==
No. overall	No. in season	Title	Original release date	U.S. viewers (millions)
43	1	"Aaron's Falcon Racecar"	March 17, 2014	2.46
Aaron falls in love with and buys a famous '63 Ford Falcon race car off Richard. But will the original owner be impressed by Aaron's Gas Monkey style? While Aaron's tied up in his passion project, Richard flips a 1919 Nash and an unusually painted truck.
44	2	"Mustang Mania"	March 24, 2014	2.02
Aaron chances the wrath of the Big Monkey when he overrides Richard's instructions on a Mustang Fastback. After picking up a "Holy Grail" Boss 429 Mustang in Minnesota, Richard questions Dennis's decision to buy a rustbucket Jaguar E-type buried in snow.
45	3	"Jacked-up Jeep"	March 31, 2014	2.06
Aaron and the Gas Monkey crew overhaul a Jeep in 24 hours to surprise a friend. Richard flips a funky gull-winged Bricklin. Daphne convinces a reluctant Richard to hire his nephew. Dennis and Richard argue over how best to sell their COPO Camaros.
46	4	"Fleetline Superflip Frenzy"	April 7, 2014	2.23
It's a Gas Monkey Fire Sale when Richard quick flips a menagerie of cars to make enough cash to buy back the first car he and Aaron built together 10 years ago. Richard and Dennis literally roll the dice on a 57 Chevy back in snowy Minnesota.
47	5	"Holy Grail Firebirds, Part 1"	April 21, 2014	1.88
Richard makes a deal to restore the first two Firebirds ever made, which comes with a strict deadline and pricey penalty; Aaron learns to race.
48	6	"Holy Grail Firebirds, Part 2"	April 28, 2014	2.64
With a 10K-a-day penalty looming, Richard can't afford to lose any more time on the two Firebirds' concourse restoration and by the end of the project, the garage says goodbye to Jordan and Tom. Richard flips a '49 Mercury that comes complete with a tuxedo cat named Buster, who becomes part of the Gas Monkey team.
49	7	"Demolition Theater"	May 5, 2014	1.72
Richard and Aaron cringe along with you while watching some seriously epic fails—from hapless drivers unable to control their vehicles to a hotrodder who catches his engine and self on fire. Richard even has his own cringe-worthy moment in a stunt plane.
50	8	"Fast Moving F100"	May 12, 2014	1.893
Richard purchases a 1972 Ford Pantera. A 1969 Ford F100 pickup truck rebuilt with a new engine as a shop truck is featured. Sue charges $1000 for reupholstering one seat.
51	Special	"Top 50 Moments"	May 20, 2014	1.354
Celebrate Cinco De Mayo at the Gas Monkey Grill with Richard, Aaron, and the Gas Monkey crew as they count down their Top 50 favorite moments. From weird cars and wild stunts, tough builds and celebrity guests — what will be #1?
