= Fast N' Loud season 6 =

Season 6 of Fast N' Loud saw a surge in its cable television ratings along its key demographics.

== Episodes ==
No. overall	No. in season	Title	Original release date	U.S. viewers (millions)
52	1	"Chopped and Dropped Model A, Part 1"	August 18, 2014	2.343
Aaron and Richard find a 1931 Model A to chop! What begins as a simple build quickly grows into a grand green machine. With less than a month to build this chromed out 60’s show car from the ground up, Richard’s wild plan may be too much.
53	2	"Chopped and Dropped Model A, Part 2"	August 25, 2014	2.692
When Richard snaps back to his senses, he puts the Monkeys back on track. They must finish the 1931 chopped Model A in ten days but not without a lot of strife. Meanwhile, Richard and Dennis argue over a holy grail find of a 1964 ½ Mustang.
54	3	"Super Sonic Camaro, Part 1"	September 1, 2014	2.803
When Richard lands the biggest deal in Gas Monkey's history, his crew struggles to hit Sonic Drive-In’s deadline. Meanwhile, Christie and Richard spar over losing an auction bid. Tensions are high and it doesn’t look like anyone’s going to come out on top.
55	4	"Super Sonic Camaro, Part 2"	September 8, 2014	2.125
The Monkeys go super big with their first corporate client, Sonic Drive-In, to build a promotional '68 Camaro SS convertible. But with only days left until delivery, Richard might miss out on a huge payday, and tarnish his reputation.
56	5	"Pikes Peak or Bust, Part 1"	September 15, 2014	2.212
As Aaron prepares for the Pikes Peak International Race, he learns that his Falcon still has some work to be done. Then Aaron springs on Richard that they have 3 weeks to build a Pace Race Truck for Pikes Peak. Meanwhile, Richard lands a sweet ’31 Model A.
57	6	"C10 Race Truck/Pikes Peak Pace Truck Part 2"	September 22, 2014	1.838
With the Pikes Peak International Race only days away, the truck is nowhere near complete; Aaron tries to keep the Falcon damage-free.
58	Special	"Cars, Concrete & Crashes"	September 29, 2014	1.079
Richard & Aaron share the wildest clips as they watch the threat of a new danger...car tires! See a couple battle a jet airplane and a guy totally lose his mind, on his own car. And wait until you catch some pals blowing their friend up with a car airbag!
59	Special	"Motorcycle Monkey Mayhem"	October 6, 2014	0.853
Richard and Aaron check out some of the craziest viral videos. Witness a motorcycle accident that leaves the driver with a tree branch impaled! Watch a wheelie crash leading to massive road rash. And take a look at some incredible dash cam crashes.
