= Race Against Time =

Race Against Time may refer to:

== Books ==
- Race Against Time (Lewis book), a 2005 book about AIDS in Africa by Stephen Lewis
- Race Against Time (Nancy Drew), a Nancy Drew book
- Race Against Time, a 1973 science fiction book by Piers Anthony
- Race Against Time, a 1987 book by Jim Eyre & John Frankland on the formation and history of the Cave Rescue Organisation
- Race Against Time (poetry collection), a 1998 poetry collection by Lee Cataldi

== Film ==
- Race Against Time, a 2000 TV movie starring Eric Roberts
- Waqt: The Race Against Time, a 2005 Indian film by Vipul Amrutlal Shah
- Ben 10: Race Against Time, a 2007 Ben 10 movie
- Motu Patlu: 36 Ghantey - Race Against Time, a 2016 Indian animated TV film based on the animated show Motu Patlu

== Music ==
- Race Against Time (band), an English heavy metal band
- Race Against Time (album), a 2009 album by Wiley
- Race Against Time: The Complete Clay Recordings, a 2007 compilation album by Charged GBH
- "Race Against Time", a 1985 song by The Exploited from the album Horror Epics
- "Race Against Time", a 1987 song by U2 from the album The Joshua Tree, B-side to "Where the Streets Have No Name"
- "Race Against Time", a song by Ja Rule on his 1999 album Venni Vetti Vecci
  - "Race Against Time Part 2", a song by Tank featuring Ja Rule, from the 2001 album The Fast and the Furious
  - "Race Against Time II", a song by Ja Rule on his 2003 album Blood in My Eye

== Television ==
- "A Race Against Time", The Adventures of Robin Hood series 4, episode 18 (1959)
- "A Race Against Time", Years of Living Dangerously season 2, episode 1 (2016)
- "Flash Gordon and the Race Against Time", Flash Gordon (1954) episode 19 (1955)
- "Race Against Time", Baywatch season 4, episodes 1–2 (1993)
- "Race Against Time", Captain Tsubasa (1983) season 3, episode 12 (1984)
- "Race Against Time", Critical Rescue episode 5 (2003)
- "Race Against Time", Fast N' Loud season 16, episode 4 (2020)
- "Race Against Time", Goldie Gold and Action Jack episode 9 (1981)
- "Race Against Time", Johnny Cypher in Dimension Zero episode 65 (1967)
- "Race Against Time", Katts and Dog season 1, episode 9 (1988)
- "Race Against Time: Part 1" and "Race Against Time: Part 2", Mannix season 7, episodes 14–15 (1974)
- "Race Against Time", M.A.S.K. season 2, episode 5 (1986)
- "Race Against Time", Masked Rider episode 33 (1996)
- "Race Against Time", Peak Practice series 7, episode 1 (1999)
- "Race Against Time", Qubool Hai 2.0 episode 9 (2021)
- "Race Against Time", Say Yes to the Dress season 8, episode 5 (2012)
- "Race Against Time", SilverHawks episode 16 (1986)
- "Race Against Time", Super Wings season 1, episode 9 (2014)
- "Race Against Time", Surface (2005) episode 9 (2005)
- "Race Against Time", Surfside 6 season 1, episode 20 (1961)
- "Race Against Time", The Adventures of Black Beauty series 2, episode 25 (1974)
- "Race Against Time (Coasts)", The Hunt (2015) episode 6 (2015)
- "Race Against Time", The Magic Boomerang episode 26 (1965)
- "Race Against Time", The Nature of Things season 42, episode 7 (2001)
- "Race Against Time", The Saddle Club series 2, episode 12 (2003)
- "Race Against Time", Wacky Races (2017) season 1, episode 29 (2017)
- "Race Against Time", Winx Club season 2, episode 11 (2005)
- "Tarzan and the Race Against Time", The Legend of Tarzan season 1, episode 1 (2001)
- "The Race Against Time: Episode 1" and "The Race Against Time: Episode 2", Speed Racer episodes 27–28 (1967)

== Other uses ==
- "A Race Against Time", season 1, episode 9 of the American actual play web series Rivals of Waterdeep (2018)

== See also ==
- "Racing Against Time", Danger Bay season 5, episode 13 (1988)
