= Fast N' Loud season 15 =

This is a list of episodes for Fast N' Loud Season 15. Season 15 started on July 8, 2019.

No. overall	No. in season	Title	Original release date	U.S. viewers (millions)
134	1	"Bullitt In The Chamber"	July 8, 2019	N/A
In the season-premiere, Richard Rawlings and the Monkeys are handed a huge challenge when Chad McQueen asks them to take a 1968 Fastback Mustang and turn it into the iconic muscle car for a recreation of Hollywood's most famous movie car chase.
135	2	"Scouts' Honor"	July 15, 2019	N/A
Working on a '79 Scout with a 707 horsepower engine; and more.
136	3	"Beyond Reasonable Scout"	July 22, 2019	N/A
The Monkeys race to be the first to drop a Hellcat motor in their ‘79 International Scout and fetch the world record for the most expensive ever sold.
137	4	"SEMA Dreamin'"	August 5, 2019	N/A
The Gas Monkeys have 5 months to convert a car into a supercar, with a budget of $300,000
138	5	"Chop Shop Truck"	August 12, 2019	N/A
Richard makes Brian Bass an offer he can’t refuse to turn his antique Ford into the ultimate Gas Monkey shop truck. And, he gets a green 1970 Cuda on the cheap.
139	6	"Monster and Monkeys"	August 19, 2019	N/A
The Monkeys find themselves in a hot-rod dilemma when their 1950's flat-head isn't tailor-made for their '33 Ford pickup, as a looming deadline approaches. Meanwhile, Richard travels west to buy a far-out 70's van, and the garage heads to Monster Jam.
140	7	"Keeping It Shelby"	August 26, 2019	N/A
The Monkeys prepare Richard's beloved '68 Mustang for the prestigious Shelby Mustang Meet and Richard buys a one-of-a-kind van once owned by a Mopar icon.
141	8	"Brady Car"	September 2, 2019	N/A
When Barry Williams asks Richard and the Monkeys to recreate the iconic Brady Bunch station wagon for HGTV, Richard can't say no. But with only 30 days and several mishaps along the way, the revamped '69 Plymouth Satellite may not make the deadline.
142	9	"Building Brady"	September 9, 2019	N/A
Barry Williams hires Richard and his crew to build the Brady Bunch station wagon with bad-ass Gas Monkey attitude for an event that's only 30 days away. The project hits a few snags after a tiki idol is found in the backseat.
143	10	"Chevy Chase"	September 16, 2019	N/A
It's a double-barreled blast of NASCAR as Richard Rawlings and the Gas Monkeys dive into stock car racing. First they turn a '52 Chevy Coupe into a fire-breathing dirt track racer and then Richard partners with NASCAR royalty.
144	11	"Thunderstruck"	September 23, 2019	N/A
Richard Rawlings and the Gas Monkeys battle numerous setbacks including an act of God as they race to finish their old-time NASCAR tribute build. Then an old friend talks Richard into working on a dubious "classic," an '85 Zimmer.
145	12	"No Second Chances"	September 9, 2019	N/A
The Monkeys put the pedal to the metal in their final attempt to finish the '72 Buick Riviera super-build in time for SEMA. The team's integrity is on the line and $300,000 has been invested so failure is not an option.
