= Fast N' Loud season 11 =

This is a list of episodes for Fast N' Loud Season 11. Season 11 started on August 29, 2016.

No. overall	No. in season	Title	Original release date	U.S. viewers (millions)
96	1	"Parked in the Keys"	August 29, 2016	1.424
After building and selling more cars than they can count, Richard and Aaron hit the beach for a much needed break so they can finally answer some of the questions and comments their fans have sent in over the years.
97	2	"Harley and Me"	September 5, 2016	1.916
Richard buys Aaron a 1942 Harley-Davidson WLA '45 with the aim of rebuilding the bike appropriate to its original era in order to participate in a vintage race on the New Jersey shore in just two weeks.
98	3	"Hot off the Pantera"	September 12, 2016	1.527
Looking to make a smash debut at an all-new Barrett-Jackson auction in eight weeks, Richard buys into Aaron’s plan to build a first-ever ’72 Pantera fitted with a custom turbo-charged Ford EcoBoost V6 engine.
99	4	"Pan-tera’s Labyrinth"	September 19, 2016	1.606
A last minute problem arises with the turbo-charged EcoBoost '72 Ford Pantera Aaron is building for the new Barrett-Jackson Northeast, which in turn, forces Richard to gamble by bringing his quarter-million dollar 2005 Ford GT to the auction instead.
100	5	"Gas Monkey Grillers"	September 26, 2016	0.573
Richard Rawlings with friends from the Gas Monkey Garage & "Street Outlaws" cast take a look online at how far adrenaline junkies will go for thrill. Clips cover it all with plane, bus, motorcycle, & race car crashes.
101	6	"The Pickup Artist"	October 3, 2016	1.516
Richard and Aaron set an ambitious deadline of just six weeks to turn an old '49 Chevy pickup into a show-quality truck in time to debut at the big Lone Star Throwdown.
102	7	"Pickup The Pieces"	October 10, 2016	1.473
Richard and Aaron's goal of turning an old '49 Chevy pickup into a show-quality truck comes down to the wire as they race to finish it in time to debut at the Lone Star Throwdown.
103	8	"Camaro Rising"	October 17, 2016	1.755
After a number of tough builds, Richard decides to do something nice for Aaron and the Monkeys and buys them a '67 Camaro mounted on a K5 chassis hoping it will lift their spirits.
104	9	"Porsche 9-1-1"	October 24, 2016	1.669
Aaron's idea to build a "junkyard Porsche" capable of going head-to-head against Richard's 2015 Porsche 911 Turbo S goes awry when the expensive conversion kits he's bought don't fit as planned.
