= Fast N' Loud season 9 =

This is a list of episodes for Fast N' Loud Season 9. Season 9 started on September 7, 2015.

No. overall	No. in season	Title	Original release date	U.S. viewers (millions)
82	0	"Year of the Monkey"	August 31, 2015	N/A
Before beginning a new season building even bigger and better cars, Richard and Aaron gather the Monkeys to remember the ups and downs of the last year.
83	1	"Cutlass Lowrider, Part 1"	September 7, 2015	2.389
Richard buys a '78 Cutlass so Aaron can build Gas Monkey's first ever lowrider, only to discover that Aaron's plan to create custom hydraulics is something he's never attempted before.
84	2	"Cutlass Lowrider, Part 2"	September 14, 2015	1.661
As Richard heads to Houston to check out Gas Monkey's top fuel NHRA dragster do some racing, the Monkeys need to do some racing of their own to finish a custom lowrider paint job on the '78 Cutlass in time for the car's debut.
85	3	"Big Red Caddy, Part 1"	September 21, 2015	1.571
Richard and Aaron decide bigger is better, giving a red '67 Cadillac convertible the luxury treatment in a risky bid to attract a higher caliber of buyers.
86	4	"Big Red Caddy, Part 2"	September 28, 2015	1.500
With a big-time buyer already on the way, engine and upholstery problems threaten to derail Richard and Aaron's red '67 Cadillac convertible.
87	5	"Supping up a Super Ford GT, Part 1"	October 5, 2015	2.054
When Richard brings a smashed up 2005 Ford GT back to the shop with the intention of making a quick repair for a fast profit, Aaron talks him into giving it the full Gas Monkey treatment.
88	6	"Supping up a Super Ford GT, Part 2"	October 12, 2015	2.027
As work on the smashed up 2005 Ford GT continues, Richard heads to Indiana to try to sell a Shelby Cobra prop car used in the superhero movie Iron Man.
88	7	"Hot Wheels, Big Deals"	December 10, 2015	N/A
Richard Rawlings, Aaron Kaufman and the Gas Monkeys are living a dream when they build a life-size Hot Wheels car. And what better car to build than one from the original “Sweet Sixteen” set that started the entire Hot Wheels movement in 1968?

== Special episodes ==
- "Fast N' Loud: Revved Up: Pebble Beach, Motorcycle Mayhem, and Auction Fever", February 18, 2016
