= Fast N' Loud season 2 =

Season 2 of Fast N' Loud started on February 18, 2013, at 9 p.m. EST.

Richard decides he has outgrown the shop on Reeder Road, and leases for $6500 per month a much bigger building nearby on Merrell Road in Dallas, Texas, where Gas Monkey Garage can work on more cars at once. They hire new mechanics to help with the extra work, as well as a couple more people to help with buying parts and looking for cars to buy for future projects. The actual move took place in January 2013.

== Episodes ==
No. overall	No. in season	Title	Original release date	U.S. viewers (millions)
15	1	"Mashed Up Mustang"	February 18, 2013	1.84
The crew renovates a ’67 Ford Mustang convertible, painting it black, lowering it, and giving it a new black interior. However, while the car was out for a test drive, it was totaled by a pickup truck driver without insurance; the car was ultimately repaired and sold (not shown).
16	2	"Bad Ass Bronco, Part 1"	February 25, 2013	1.80
17	3	"Bad Ass Bronco, Part 2"	March 4, 2013	2.00
In this two-part show, Gas Monkey Garage rebuilds a ’76 Bronco that is rusted beyond belief and sells it to the owner of the Twin Peaks restaurant chain.
18	4	"Far-Out Fairlane"	March 11, 2013	1.79
Richard and Aaron resurrect two cars they bought from the Dallas Can Academy: a ’59 Fairlane and a ’54 Bel Air. Richard sells the Galaxie to his Swedish friend, Magnus Einarsson of Lone Star Cars AB, while Phipps gets the Bel Air running and helps selling it to a passerby.
19	5	"Stung By a '67 Corvette Stingray"	March 18, 2013	2.15
Richard buys a ’73 Dodge Challenger and a ’67 Stingray, and while in Las Vegas, buys Evel Knievel's Messerschmitt microcar.
20	6	"Trials of a T-Bird"	March 25, 2013	2.24
While Richard is out of town buying a ’58 Corvette, office manager Christie Brimberry buys a ’67 T-Bird that Richard forgot he had agreed to buy, the crew then turns it into a profitable deal. Model Alloy Ash makes an appearance at the new shop, showing off her welding skills.
21	7	"Ferocious Ford and Fast Ferrari"	April 1, 2013	2.12
A ’38 Ford contaminated with rat droppings is turned into a cool hot rod. Richard buys Emmitt Smith's dilapidated Mercedes then takes a gamble on a banged up Ferrari F40.
