= Fast N' Loud season 10 =

This is a list of episodes for Fast N' Loud Season 10. Season 10 started on December 29, 2015.

No. overall	No. in season	Title	Original release date	U.S. viewers (millions)
TBA	1	"Back to the Beginning with Gas Monkey Garage"	December 29, 2015	N/A
After over four years and hundreds of cars, Richard and Aaron take a look back at the rise of Gas Monkey from a little shop to the 800 pound gorilla it is today.
89	2	"Racing a '67 Dodge Dart, Part 1"	January 4, 2016	2.946
Richard receives a drag race challenge from a couple of Internet upstarts, at which point he changes gears on his big '67 Dart build to transform it into the ultimate dragster.
90	3	"Racing a '67 Dodge Dart, Part 2"	January 11, 2016	2.044
With engine problems on the Dart threatening to stop their big drag race with Roadkill before it starts, Richard and Aaron could face epic humiliation in front of millions of fans.
91	4	"Frustrated with a '32 Ford/Return to Pike's Peak, Part 1"	January 18, 2016	2.453
Richard buys a '32 5-Window Ford Coupe planning for an easy build for the Monkeys while Aaron's away racing at Pike's Peak, but fate and fortune have other ideas.
92	5	"Frustrated with a '32 Ford/Return to Pike's Peak, Part 2"	January 25, 2016	2.544
The '32 5-Window Ford Coupe Richard bought as an easy build for the Monkeys continues giving them problems, as weather and car issues threaten to derail Aaron's trip to Pike's Peak.
93	6	"Motorcycle Mayhem/Packing a Packard for Pebble, Part 1"	February 1, 2016	2.357
When Richard's '29 Packard receives an invitation to the fabled Concours d'Elegance at Pebble Beach, he challenges the Monkeys to a motorcycle build-off to keep them busy while he's away.
94	7	"Motorcycle Mayhem/Packing a Packard for Pebble, Part 2"	February 8, 2016	2.680
While Richard takes his '29 Packard to compete at the elite Concours d'Elegance at Pebble Beach, the Monkeys race to complete their motorcycles in their big build-off.
95	8	"Revving Up a '69 Riviera"	February 15, 2016	2.446
Auction fever hits the garage as the Monkeys have less than a week to build a '69 Riviera to sell at the Leake Auction along with the motorcycles from their big chopper build-off to determine who will win Richard's big prize.
