= Fast N' Loud season 8 =

This is a list of episodes for Fast N' Loud Season 8. Season 8 started on March 23, 2015.

No. overall	No. in season	Title	Original release date	U.S. viewers (millions)
75	Special	"Caddy Countdown"	March 23, 2015	N/A
The Gas Monkeys search for high-speed glory in their powerful vehicles.
76	1	"Scat Pack Challenger, Part 1"	March 30, 2015	N/A
Richard and Aaron try and transform a vintage '71 Dodge Scat Pack Challenger.
77	2	"Scat Pack Challenger, Part 2"	March 30, 2015	N/A
Aaron and his team attempt to get the '71 Challenger build to accept the 2015 Challenger technology. In the process, they create a one of a kind resto/mod. Richard buys a busted up '34 Plymouth and the crew takes the '57 Shorty bus for a test drive.
78	3	"Back To The 80's In A 68' Coronet"	April 6, 2015	N/A
Richard buys a '69 Malibu only to realize there are massive issues. Aaron crashes into a '68 Coronet on the GMG lot. Richard travels to St. Louis to buy a tricked out '79 Camaro. Mötley Crüe performs at Gas Monkey Live grand opening.
79	4	"Road to Barrett Jackson, Part 1"	April 13, 2015	N/A
Richard sells the '79 Camaro to prepare for Barrett Jackson, the biggest auction of the year. Aaron's team builds a '68 Impala while Richard and Dennis buy a '64 Corvette Stingray. Richard pulls the '66 VW bus, '69 F100 truck and '76 C10 to auction.
80	5	"Road to Barrett Jackson, Part 2"	April 20, 2015	N/A
It's showtime at Barrett Jackson with wheeling-and-dealing throughout the week showcasing the excitement. Richard's Stingray arrives just in time for the start of the auction. Meanwhile, Aaron attends NHRA in Vegas to see how team Gas Monkey performs.
81	6	"Rocking 76 G10 van"	April 27, 2015	N/A
Richard and Aaron take on a different build when they decide to transform a $300 find on the side of the road into a '76 Exploration Van.The Dale Earnhardt '56 Nomad makes an appearance back at the shop, as KC and his team are tasked with fixing the body after it hit a deer.
