= Gas Monkey Bar N' Grill =

American restaurant and live music bar in Dallas, Texas

Coordinates: 32.8608°N 96.8961°W

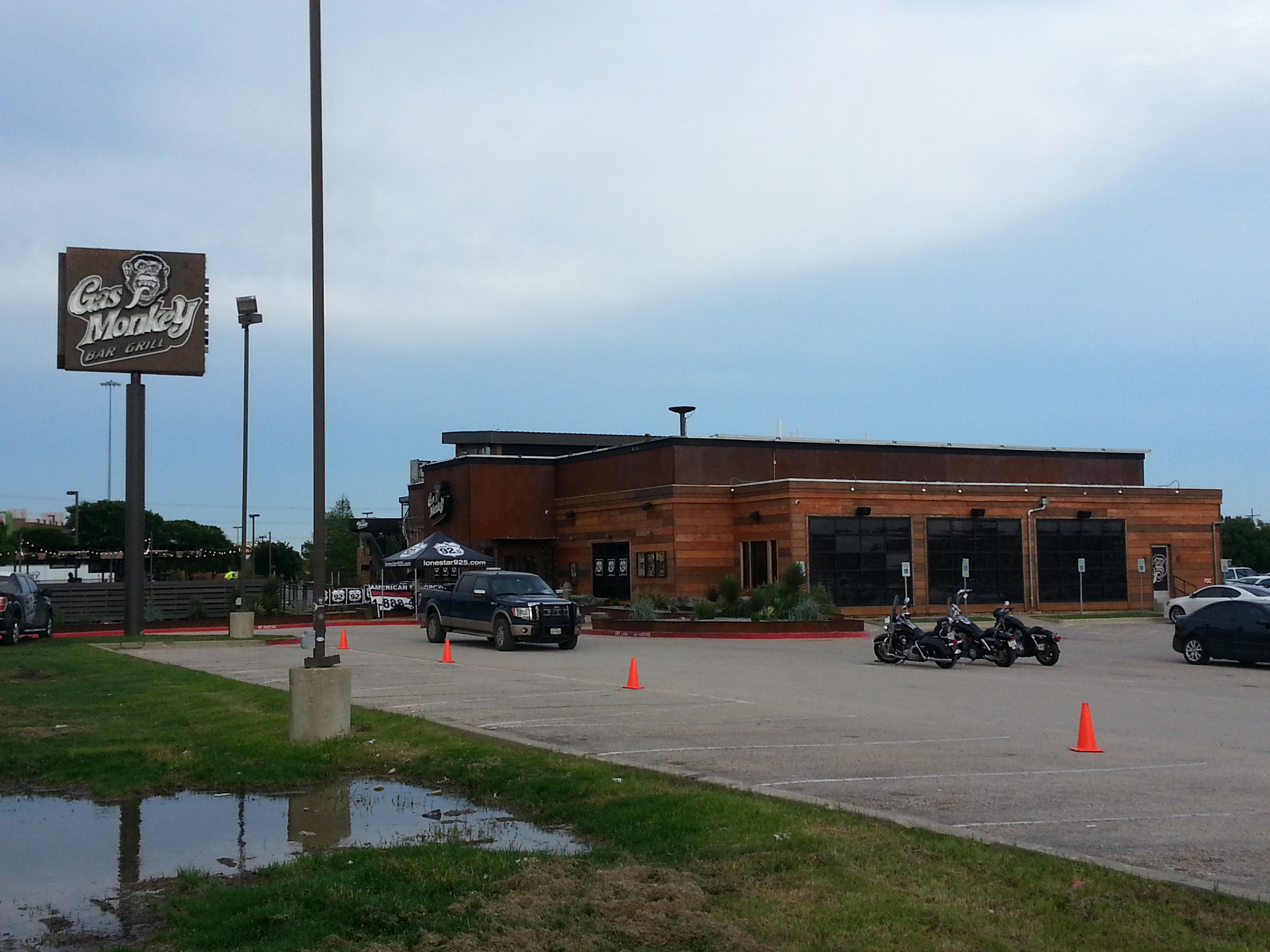
- Interactive map of Gas Monkey Bar N' Grill
- Former names: Firewater Bar and Grill
- Address: 10261 Technology Boulevard East; Dallas, Texas, United States
- Owner: Richard Rawlings
- Seating type: Bi-level standing and seating
- Capacity: 1200
- Type: Bar, restaurant
- Event: Various

Construction
- Opened: September 2013
- Renovated: 2013

Gas Monkey Bar N' Grill was an American restaurant and live music bar in Dallas, Texas started by entrepreneur Richard Rawlings, who is also the star of Discovery Channel reality television show Fast N' Loud.

== History ==
=== Beginnings (2013) ===
In September 2013, Rawlings opened Gas Monkey Bar N' Grill, a 1,800 m^{2} (19,000 sq ft) live music bar and restaurant. With a capacity of 1200 people, the facility is located at the former Firewater Bar and Grill in Northwest Dallas. Alex Mendonsa, who ran the House of Blues Las Vegas was hired as the general manager, while David Hollister of Yucatán Taco Stand and H2 Gourmet Burger Company was employed to manage culinary duties. On September 21, 2013, two days before the grand opening, American rock band Old ’97s performed the first live show at the venue.

=== Airport location (2014) ===
A second Gas Monkey Bar N' Grill location was opened in International Terminal D at Dallas/Fort Worth International Airport in March 2014. The chief executive has indicated a desire to open a third Texas location somewhere other than the Dallas–Fort Worth metropolitan area.

=== Gas Monkey Live (2014) ===
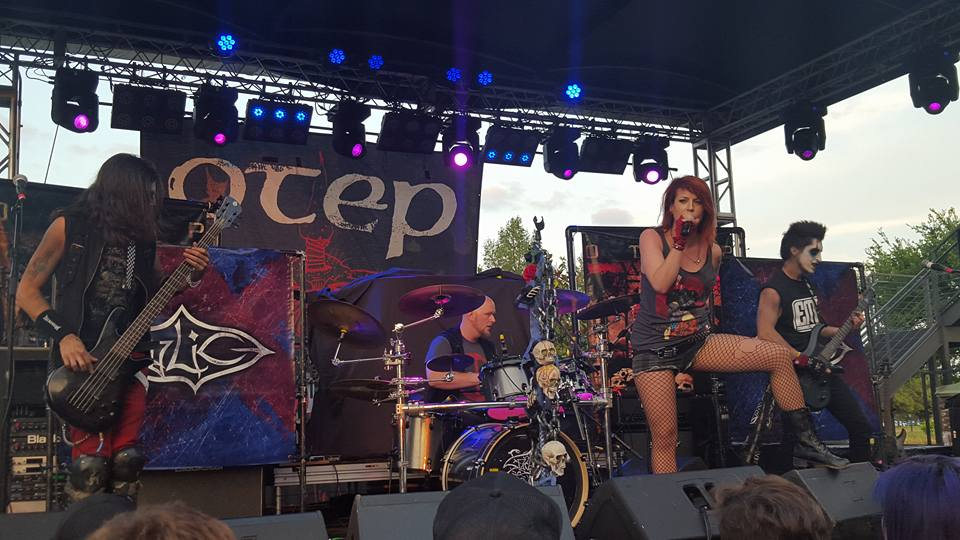
American rock band Solice from Arlington, Texas performing at Gas Monkey Bar N' Grill

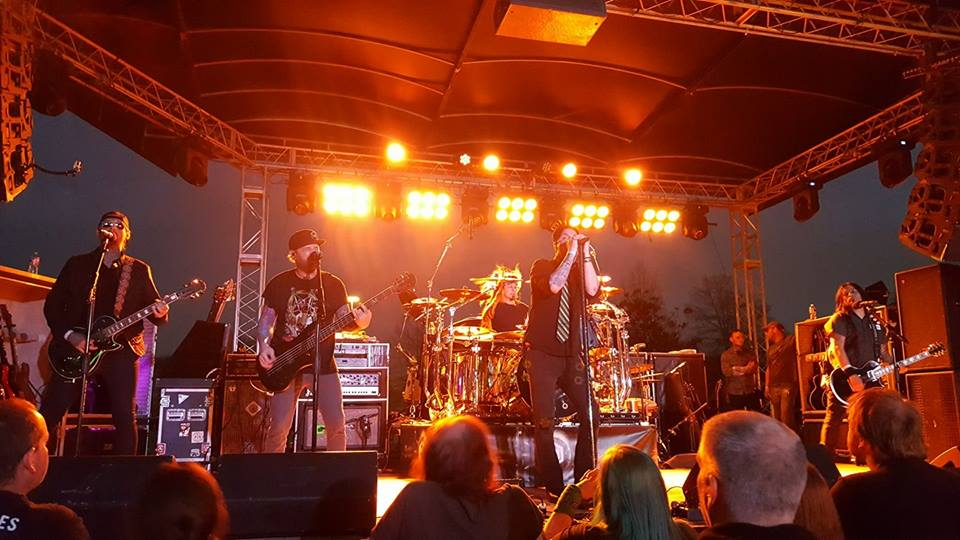
American rock band Messer from Dallas, Texas performing at Gas Monkey Bar N' Grill

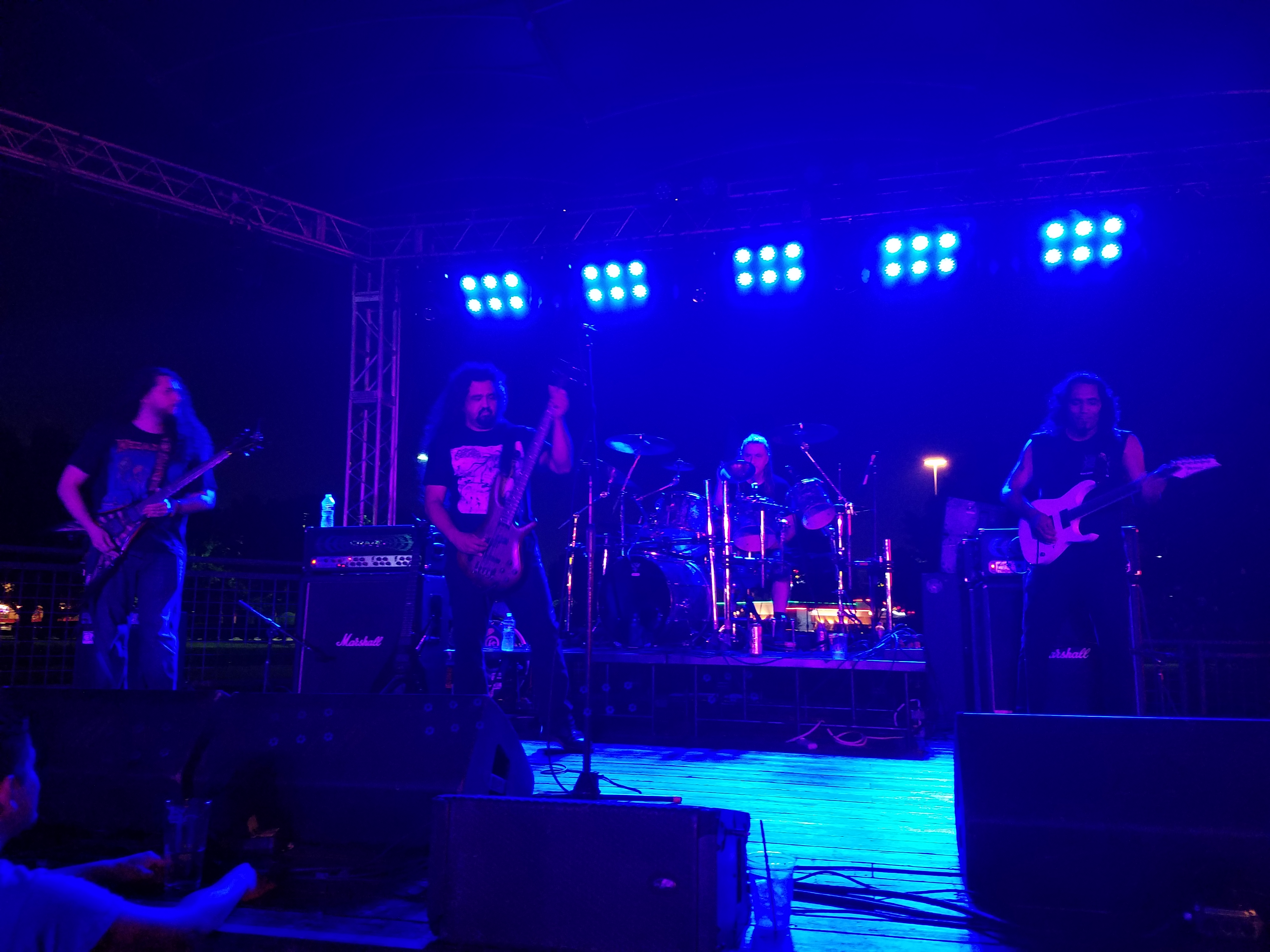
American heavy metal band Chemicaust from Dallas, Texas performing at Gas Monkey Bar N' Grill

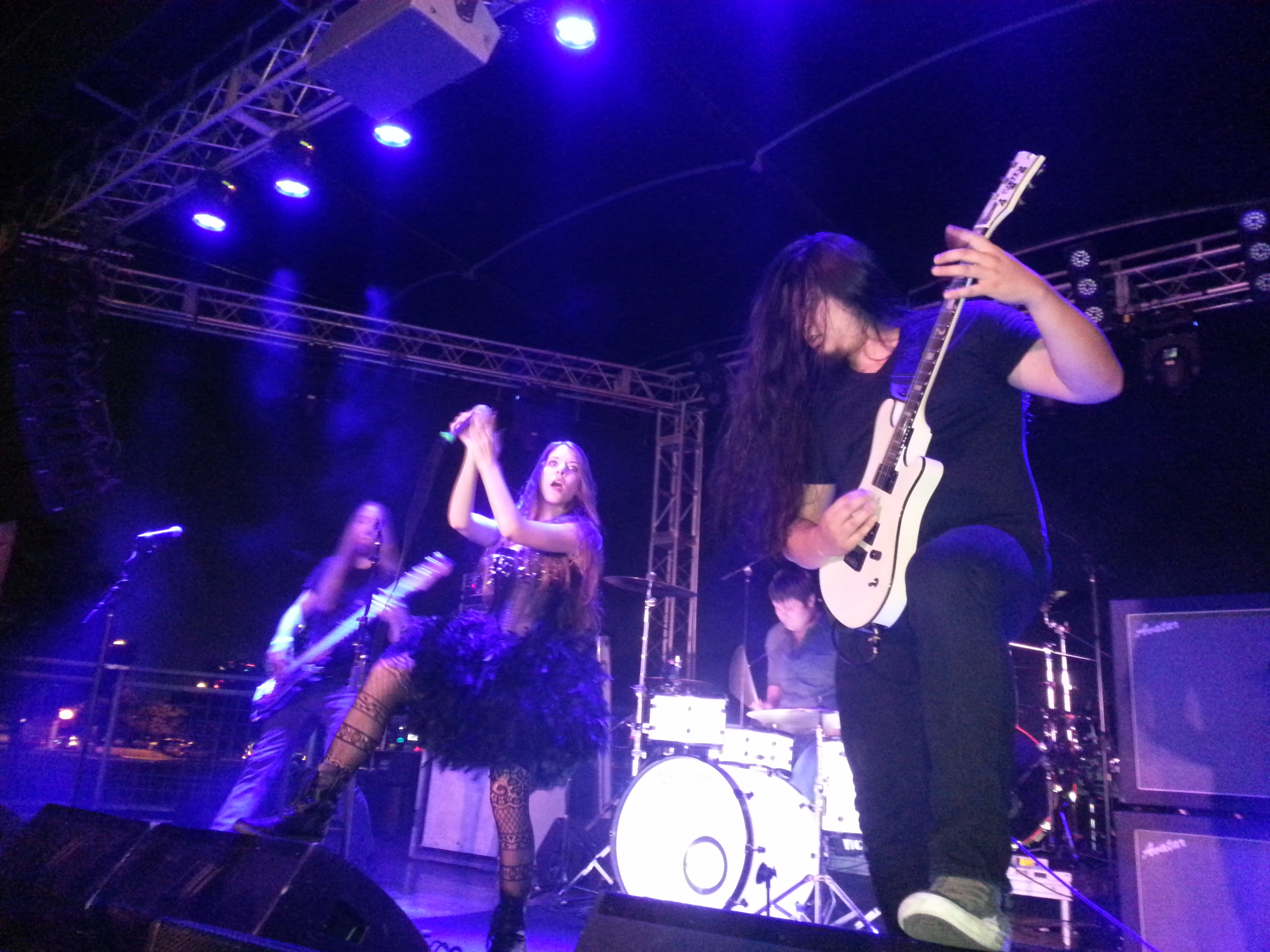
American alternative rock band Unveiled from Dallas, Texas performing at Gas Monkey Bar N' Grill

In October 2014, Rawlings and Mendonsa, talent buyer Peter Ore (former Vice President of Talent Live Nation Denver) along with brothers Dan and Mike Flaherty of United Commercial Realty opened Gas Monkey Live at the former Toby Keith's I Love This Bar & Grill in Northwest Dallas.

=== Gas Monkey Energy and Key West expansion (2016) ===
In March 2016, the company opened its third Gas Monkey Bar N’ Grill location in Key West, Florida. On April 8, 2016, the Supersuckers performed at the venue for its grand opening. In May 2016, Gas Monkey Energy, a newly created energy drink manufacturer, was added as a division of the Gas Monkey empire.

=== Richard Rawlings’ Garage (2016–2019) ===
In September 2016, the very first Richard Rawlings’ Garage, a new restaurant "designed to attract local residents" and be a "local hangout", was opened in Harker Heights, Texas at the former location of Twin Peaks although that location closed for business in March 2019. In 2017, another location was announced at Foxwoods Resort Casino but is not currently open.

=== Closure of Gas Monkey Key West, Gas Monkey Live and expansion of Gas Monkey Bar N' Grill (2020-2021) ===
Some time between October 2018 and May 2020, Gas Monkey Key West closed. In May 2020, Gas Monkey Live closed. Gas Monkey Bar N' Grill has begun renovating their stage in order to expand venue capacity.

=== Amplified Live ===
On September 24, 2021 it was announced that Gas Monkey Bar and Grill would be rebranded as Amplified Live. Richard Rawlings would still own the trademark for Gas Monkey but would no longer be involved with Amplified Live.

== Gallery ==
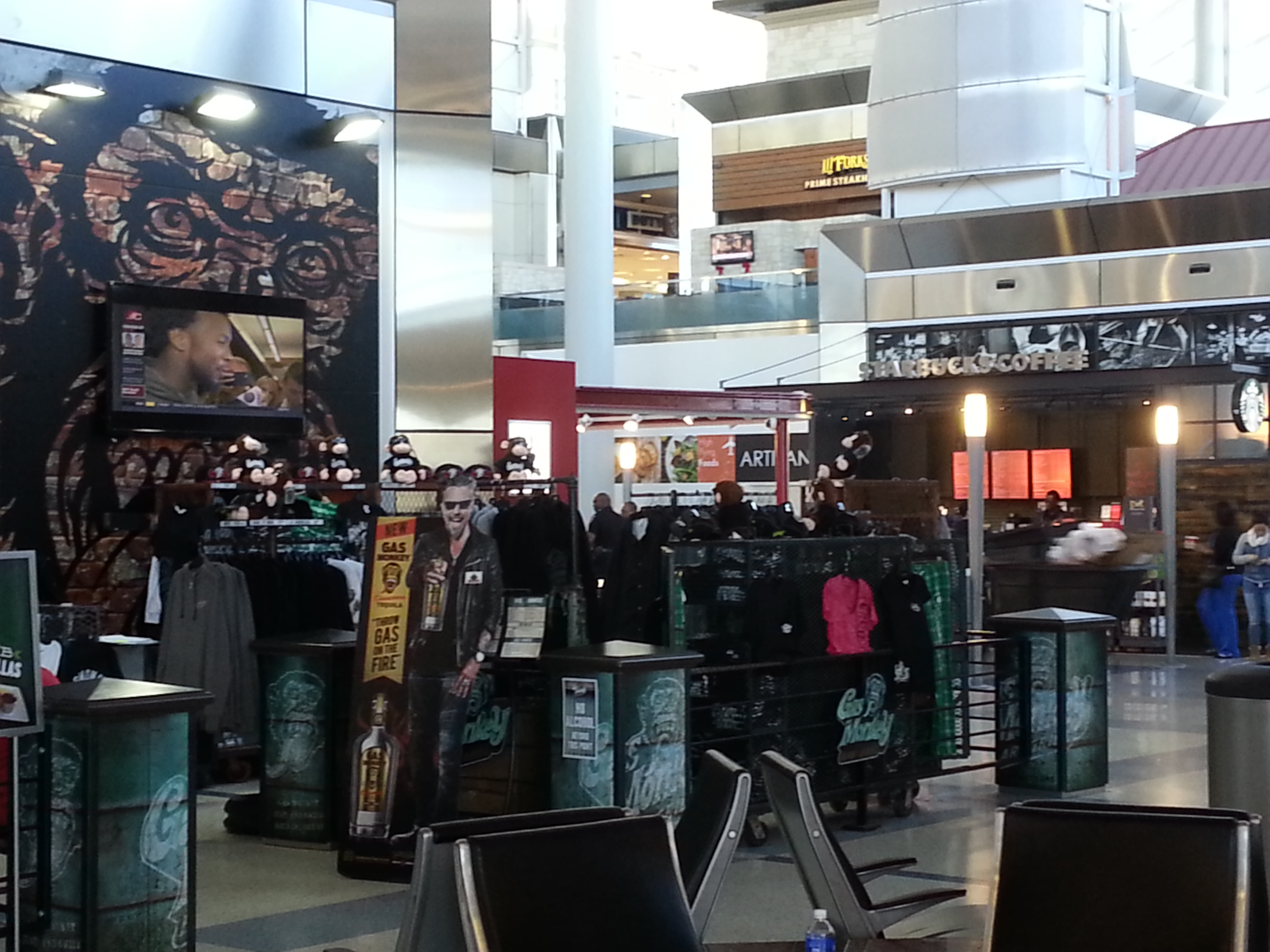
GMBG airport merchandise section

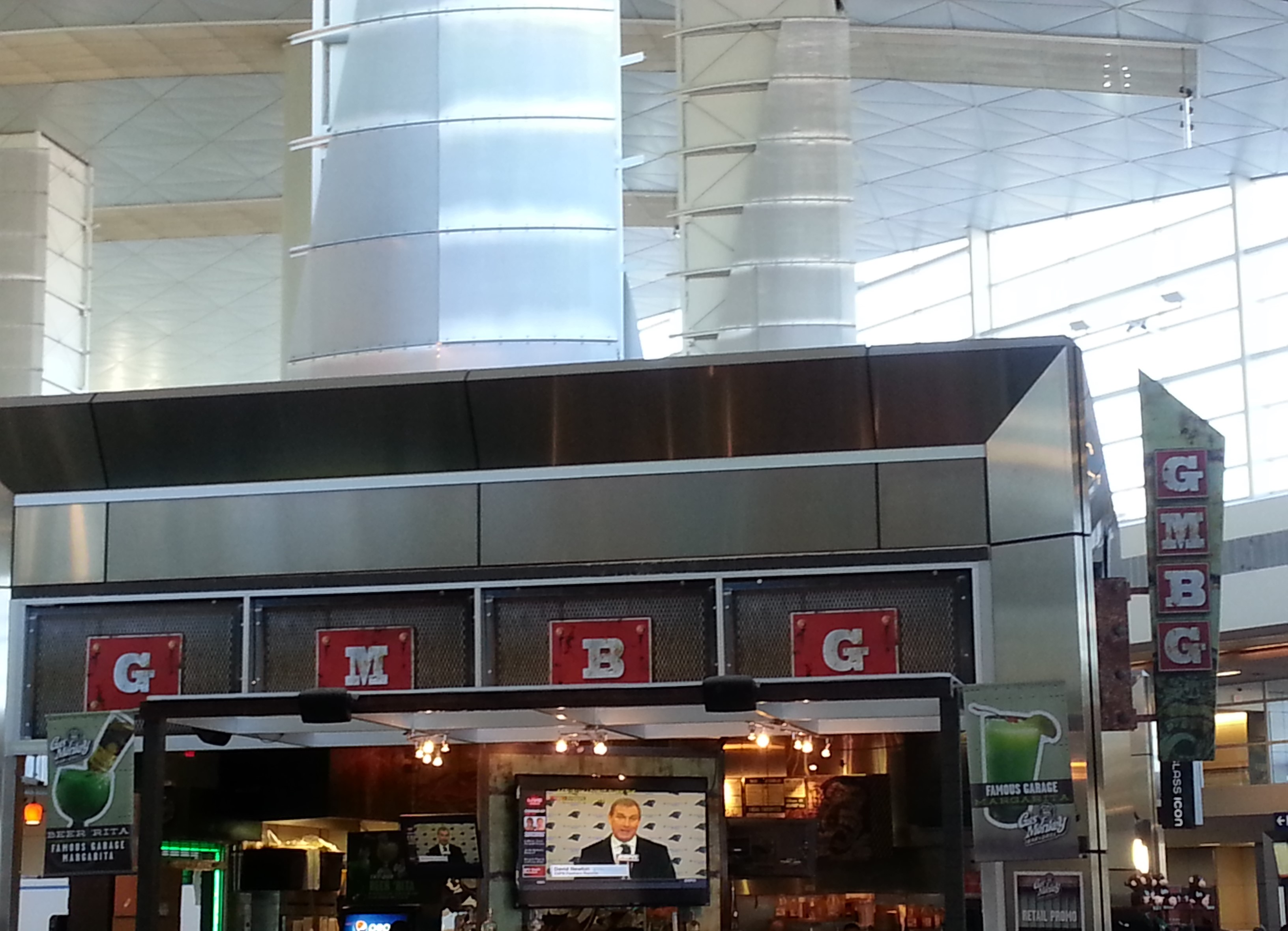
GMBG Airport bar

== See also ==
- List of restaurants in Dallas
