= Fast N' Loud season 16 =

This is a list of episodes for Season 16 of Fast N' Loud.

No. overall	No. in season	Title	Original release date	U.S. viewers (millions)
146	1	"Super Troupe Jeep"	March 1, 2020	N/A
Gas Monkey teams up with the Gary Sinise Foundation to build a custom '81 Jeep CJ7 as a throwback tribute to the soldiers for Veteran's Day. Later, an original '68 Chevelle has Richard seeing green but only if he can part with his California dream.
147	2	"Wranglin World Records"	April 6, 2020	N/A
The Monkeys begin work on a 2018 Jeep Wrangler — the second of two jeeps they're customizing for the Gary Sinese Foundation's Veteran's Day auction. Meanwhile, Richard makes a deal on a '55 Crown Vic he hopes to donate to the Gas Monkey Foundation.
148	3	"Vintage Payday"	April 13, 2020	N/A
Richard races toward a vintage payday by restoring his '37 Buick Racer back to its Indy 500 roots. Meanwhile, the guys buy a one-owner '77 Blazer that could fetch them double their money. Later, a surprise birthday gift has Richard feeling nostalgic.
149	4	"Race Against Time"	April 20, 2020	N/A
The Monkeys race to finish their Buick Indy Racer for a deep-pocket client. Next, a collector wheels and deals for Richard's 1975 Datsun 280-Z and Brian Bass reveals upcoming changes at Gas Monkey Garage.
150	5	"Quick-Flippin' a Caddy"	April 27, 2020	N/A
Richard hopes to use a 1963 Cadillac for a flip project
151	6	"In a Galaxie Far, Far Away"	May 4, 2020	N/A
The team takes a 1968 Ford Galaxie completely apart to deal with a rust problem. Charley Pride brings his totalled Stutz in for reconstruction.
152	7	"Galaxie Quest"	May 11, 2020	N/A
The team travels to a Minnesota barn to buy a 1969 Camaro RS with 67000 miles for $12,500. The Galaxie is repainted and reassembled.
153	8	"Hot for Firebirds"	May 18, 2020	N/A
The Monkeys start out with a quick-and-easy flip on a '67 Firebird convertible that quickly turns into a full-on Gas Monkey build the guys depend on for a profit. Later, a Hellcat comes up missing and a full-scale mission is launched for its return.
154	9	"Flippin' the Bird"	May 25, 2020	N/A
The guys face a seven-day deadline to raise their '67 Firebird from the ashes. Meanwhile, Richard heads to the boondocks of Tokio, TX, to search for a rare '51 VW Samba Bus. Finally, NFL star DeMarcus Ware shops for an authentic Gas Monkey hotrod.
155	10	"Fanning the Favorites"	June 8, 2020	N/A
TBA
