= Fast N' Loud =

American reality television series

- Genre: Reality
- Starring: Richard Rawlings
- Composers: David Vanacore (Vanacore Music)
- Country of origin: United States
- Original language: English
- No. of seasons: 16
- No. of episodes: 160 (Season 1–16 + Specials); List of episodes

Production
- Producer: Rebecca Graham-Forde
- Running time: 45 minutes
- Production company: Pilgrim Studios

Original release
- Network: Discovery
- Release: June 6, 2012 – June 8, 2020

Related
- Misfit Garage, Shifting Gears with Aaron Kaufman, Aaron Needs a Job

Fast N' Loud was a reality-styled Discovery Channel TV show featuring Richard Rawlings and his crew from the Dallas, Texas-based Gas Monkey Garage as they search for tired and run-down cars, and restore them for profit.

The show was successful in its first season. The show also has a spin-off show called Misfit Garage and Fast N' Loud: Demolition Theater in which Richard and other employees, and also the "victims" of the same clip watch these with their comments

Rawlings, along with former GMG mechanic Aaron Kaufman, were invited to participate in a motorcycle build-off with long-established bike builders Orange County Choppers, Paul Jr. Designs, and Jesse James. Rawlings and Kaufman came in second to Paul Jr. with James coming in third.

Fast N' Loud is produced for Discovery by Pilgrim Studios, with Craig Piligian and Eddie Rohwedder serving as executive producers.

On June 19, 2019, the 15th season was announced to premiere on July 8, 2019. Season 16 was announced on March 2, 2020, and premiered on March 30.

On episode 1578 of The Joe Rogan Experience (aired on December 15, 2020), Rawlings confirmed that Fast N' Loud had ended.

== Reception ==
In 2016, a survey of the 50 TV shows with the most Facebook likes by The New York Times found that Fast N' Loud was "the show most favored by men on the list, by far — 83% of 'likes' came from men".

== Episodes ==
Season	Episodes	Originally released		Average rating (millions)
Season	Episodes	First released	Last released	Average rating (millions)
1	14	June 12, 2012	October 9, 2012	1.43
2	7	February 19, 2013	April 2, 2013	1.99
3	8	June 11, 2013	July 30, 2013	2.21
4	13	September 5, 2013	January 28, 2014	2.48
5	8	March 18, 2014	May 20, 2014	2.95
6	6	August 19, 2014	September 27, 2014	3.12
7	8	October 14, 2014	December 9, 2014	3.09
8	7	March 24, 2015	April 28, 2015	3.14
9	8	September 9, 2015	December 11, 2015	3.56
10	8	December 29, 2015	February 16, 2016	3.42
11	9	August 30, 2016	October 26, 2016	3.15
12	11	December 9, 2016	March 28, 2017	3.07
13	6	October 17, 2017	November 21, 2017	2.97
14	9	April 3, 2018	May 8, 2018	2.92
15	12	July 8, 2019	September 23, 2019	3.45
16	10	March 30, 2020	June 8, 2020	4.23
