= Richard Rawlings =

American entrepreneur and media personality

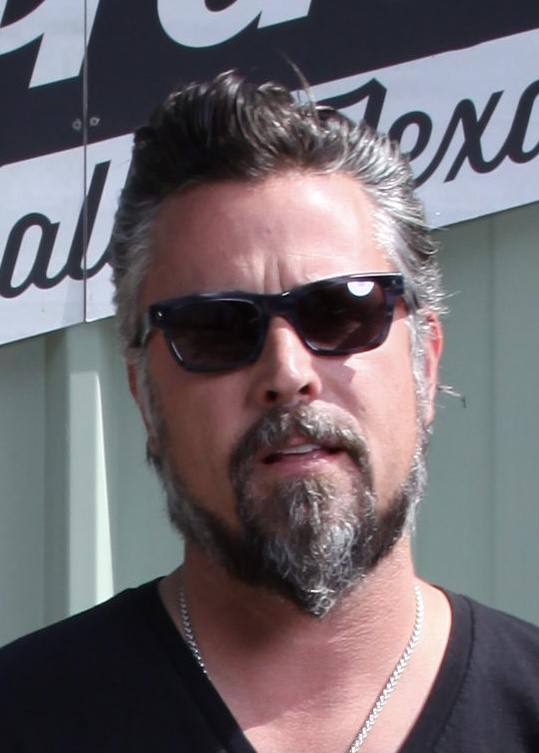
- Born: March 30, 1969 (age 57); Fort Worth, Texas, United States
- Education: Eastern Hills High School
- Occupations: Businessman; reality television star
- Years active: 2002–present
- Employer(s): Gas Monkey Bar N' Grill; Gas Monkey Garage; Gas Monkey Live
- Known for: Star of Fast N' Loud and "Garage Rehab"; Owner of Gas Monkey Garage
- Television: Fast 'n Loud
- Spouse(s): Karen K Grimes (1993–1994) Suzanne Marie Mergele (1999–2009, 2015–2019) Katerina Rawlings (2020-Present)

Richard Rawlings (born March 30, 1969) is an American entrepreneur and media personality. He was the star of the reality television show Fast N' Loud on Discovery Channel. He is also a proprietor of the Gas Monkey Garage as well as both the Gas Monkey Bar N' Grill and Gas Monkey Live music venues in Dallas, Texas. Beginning in 2014, Rawlings was featured in national television commercials promoting Dodge vehicles and financing.

== Early years ==
Rawlings was born in Fort Worth, Texas, in 1969. As a child he went to auto shows with his father and constructed cars, having purchased his first at the age of 14. In the next six to seven years, he graduated from Eastern Hills High School

In 1993, Rawlings married Karen K. Grames, but they divorced the following year. In 1999, Rawlings started the printing and advertising company Lincoln Press. Also in 1999, he married his second wife, Suzanne Marie Mergele, in Las Vegas, Nevada. The couple divorced in 2009, but remarried in 2015. On March 11, 2019, Rawlings announced via his Twitter account that Suzanne and he were separating and filing for divorce.

== Gas Monkey Garage ==
In 2002, Rawlings launched Gas Monkey Garage in Dallas, selling Lincoln Press in 2004. The shop customizes classic and hot-rod automobiles for customers worldwide. From 2012 to 2020, the business was the focus of the Discovery Channel series Fast N' Loud.

Rawlings also co-hosts the show Garage Rehab on the Discovery Channel since 2017, which is about overhauling struggling automotive shops, along with co-hosts Russell Holmes and Chris Stephens. He pitched the concept to the network circa 2015.

In 2022, Gas Monkey Garage became title sponsor for Peter Hickman and FHO Racing at the Isle of Man TT Races.

== Cannonball Run/Bullrun ==
In May 2007, Richard Rawlings and co-pilot Dennis Collins allegedly broke the 1979 Cannonball Run time from New York City to Los Angeles of 32 hours and 51 minutes. The two bet rival Jay Riecke that they could beat the time in their 2007 Bullrun entry, a black Ferrari 550, modified with extra fuel cells. Their final time was 31 hours and 59 minutes, but much debate remains in the legitimacy of this time, as the distance and times do not match up. They were the only pair to defeat the 1975 mark by Rick Cline and Jack May in a Ferrari Dino, as all other competitors did not leave and arrive at the correct locations or took alternate routes that did not follow the original Cannonball Runs of the 1970s. Even their personal heroes Dave Heinz and Dave Yarborough in their Jaguar XJ-S that set the 1979 record left from Darien, Connecticut, instead of Manhattan.

== Food and music venues ==
In September 2013, Rawlings started Gas Monkey Bar N' Grill in Northwest Dallas and a second location at Dallas Fort Worth International Airport opened in March 2014. Rawlings indicated a desire to open a third Texas location outside of the Dallas–Fort Worth metroplex.

In October 2014, Gas Monkey Live, a venue dedicated predominantly to live music, was opened. The venue closed in May 2020.

Rawlings, started a new restaurant venture, Richard Rawlings' Garage. The first restaurant opened in Harker Heights, Texas, in 2016, and it permanently closed in March 2019.

In 2019, Rawlings licensed the Gas Monkey brand to a line of energy drinks.

== Autobiography ==
On May 12, 2015, Rawlings published his first autobiography entitled Fast N’ Loud: Blood, Sweat and Beers.
