= 2022 Stadium Super Trucks =

Off-road racing season

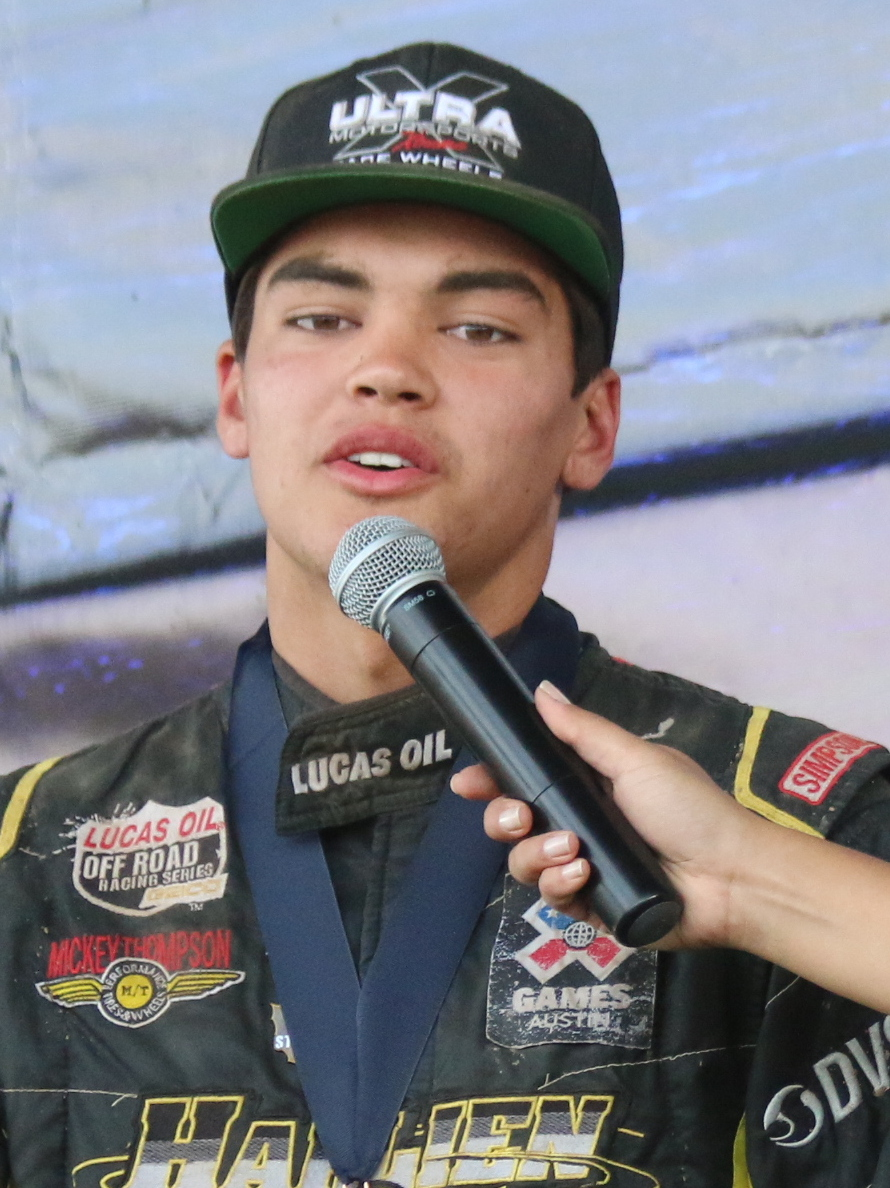
Gavin Harlien, the 2022 champion

The 2022 Stadium Super Trucks were the tenth season of the Stadium Super Trucks. The season began with the Long Beach Street Circuit and concluded at Bristol Motor Speedway.

Matthew Brabham entered as the defending champion, though he only ran select races due to his commitment to Indy Lights. Gavin Harlien won his first championship.

== Drivers ==
No.	Driver	Races
007	(United States) Fielding Shredder	7–8
.50	(United States) Matt Carriker	7–8
7	(United States) Robby Gordon	1–2, 7–8
12	(United Kingdom) Shaun Richardson	1–2
14	(United States) Davey Hamilton Jr.	1–2
21	(United States) Zoey Edenholm	All
F26	(United States) Stanton Barrett	5–6
28	(United States) Robert Stout	All
32	(United States) Ryan Arciero	1–2
51	(United States) Ryan Beat	5–6
52	(United States) Derek Bieri	7–8
55	(United States) Gavin Harlien	All
57	(United States) Bill Hynes	All
61	(United States) Cory Winner	3–4
67	(United States) Ben Maier	3–8
77	(United States) Max Gordon	All
83	(Australia) Matthew Brabham	1–2, 5–6
435	(United States) Dave Kiley	7–8
801	(United States) Dave Sparks	7–8
1776	(United States) Garrett Mitchell	1–2, 5–8
Sources: (Note: Entry lists: Long Beach (Races 1–2); Mid-Ohio (Races 3–4); Nashville (Races 5–6); Bristol (Races 7–8))

== Schedule ==
Long Beach, which has hosted SST since the inaugural season in 2013, served as the season opener for the first time. Dates at Mid-Ohio Sports Car Course and the Music City Grand Prix took place in support of the IndyCar Series, while a round at Bristol Motor Speedway was added as part of Cleetus McFarland's Bristol 1000 weekend. Honda Indy Toronto was originally scheduled before being removed as Robby Gordon was away on business for his Speed UTV brand.

Round	Track	Location	Date	Supporting
1	Long Beach Street Circuit	Long Beach, California	April 8–10	Grand Prix of Long Beach
2	Mid-Ohio Sports Car Course	Lexington, Ohio	July 1–3	Honda Indy 200
3	Nashville Street Circuit	Nashville, Tennessee	August 5–7	Music City Grand Prix
4	Bristol Motor Speedway	Bristol, Tennessee	September 3–5	Bristol 1000

== Season summary ==
The season opener at Long Beach saw the SST debuts of Ryan Arciero and Cleetus McFarland while Davey Hamilton Jr. made his return as a full-time driver after a three-year absence. The Gordon family swept the weekend as Max Gordon scored his first career win after holding off his father Robby, who won the second race after McFarland spun and hit the wall as he approached the finish.

The second round at Mid-Ohio saw the series debuts of Ben Maier and Cory Winner. Robby Gordon skipped the weekend due to overseas obligations with Speed UTV whereas Hamilton exited the series due to an injury he sustained in Long Beach. Gavin Harlien controversially won the first race after United States Auto Club officials accidentally extended the distance from 11 to 13 laps; although Robert Stout beat Harlien to the finish on the 13th lap, USAC restored the results after 11 laps and granted Harlien the victory. Harlien and Stout continued to be the top drivers in the second race, but a last-lap pass by Max Gordon enabled him to take the win.

At Nashville, Brabham won the Saturday race after holding off Harlien. While Indy Lights was also at the weekend, Brabham was able to run SST after rain forced the day's Lights activities to be canceled. Harlien returned the favor in the second race, though he was involved in a wreck with Stout and McFarland that caused the latter to flip.

The Bristol round was organized in support of McFarland's Bristol 1000, a race involving McFarland and multiple YouTubers. As a result, five of the 13 drivers racing SST were media personalities with no prior series experience: Derek Bieri of Vice Grip Garage, Matt Carriker of YouTube channel DemolitionRanch, Hyperdrive star Fielding Shredder, and the Diesel Brothers Dave Kiley and Dave Sparks. The series newcomers were scrutinized for their aggressive driving styles that impacted the full-time drivers competing for points, and Harlien's father confronted Sparks after the second race. Harlien and Stout won the round's two races.

== Results and standings ==
=== Race results ===
Round	Race	Event	Fastest qualifier	Pole position	Most laps led	Winning driver	Ref
1	1	Long Beach	(United States) Robby Gordon	(United States) Bill Hynes	(United States) Bill Hynes	(United States) Max Gordon	
1	2	Long Beach	(United States) Robby Gordon	(United States) Ryan Arciero	(United States) Cleetus McFarland	(United States) Robby Gordon	
2	3	Mid-Ohio	(United States) Gavin Harlien	(United States) Bill Hynes	(United States) Gavin Harlien (United States) Bill Hynes	(United States) Gavin Harlien	
2	4	Mid-Ohio	(United States) Gavin Harlien	(United States) Max Gordon	(United States) Robert Stout	(United States) Max Gordon	
3	5	Nashville	(United States) Robert Stout	(United States) Bill Hynes	(United States) Gavin Harlien	(Australia) Matthew Brabham	
3	6	Nashville	(United States) Robert Stout	(United States) Cleetus McFarland	(United States) Cleetus McFarland	(United States) Gavin Harlien	
4	7	Bristol	(United States) Max Gordon	(United States) Bill Hynes	(United States) Bill Hynes	(United States) Gavin Harlien	
4	8	Bristol	(United States) Max Gordon	(United States) Dave Kiley	(United States) Cleetus McFarland	(United States) Robert Stout	

=== Drivers' championship ===
Rank	Driver	(California) LBH		(Ohio) MOH		(Tennessee) NSH		(Tennessee) BRI		Points
1	(United States) Gavin Harlien	6	6	1* (Note: Harlien finished Mid-Ohio Race 1 in second due to a scoring error that extended the race from 11 to 13 laps. The official results use the running order after the original 11 laps, when Harlien was first.)	2	2*	1	1	5	216
2	(United States) Max Gordon	1	3	7	1	3	7	6	2	191
3	(United States) Robert Stout	3	4	2 (Note: Stout finished Mid-Ohio Race 2 in first due to a scoring error that extended the race from 11 to 13 laps. The official results use the running order after the original 11 laps, when Stout was second.)	3*	8	10	4	1	183
4	(United States) Bill Hynes	**7***	11	3*	7	**9**	6	**2***	8	131
5	(United States) Robby Gordon	2	1					3	4	123
6	(Australia) Matthew Brabham	4	2			1	2			117
7	(Australia) Ben Maier			4	4	5	3	5	6	113
8	(United States) Zoey Edenholm	11	7	6	6	6	5	10	9	108
9	(United States) Cleetus McFarland	10	9*			10	**9***	12	3*	84
10	(United States) Ryan Beat					4	8			34
11	(United States) Stanton Barrett					7	4			32
12	(United States) Cory Winner			5	5					32
13	(United States) Jerett Brooks	5	10							31
14	(United States) Fielding Shredder							7	10	29
15	(United States) Derek Bieri							9	7	26
16	(United States) Davey Hamilton Jr.	8	8							26
17	(United States) Ryan Arciero	12	**5**							25
18	(United States) Dave Sparks							8	13	21
19	(United Kingdom) Shaun Richardson	9	12							21
20	(United States) Matt Carriker							11	12	19
21	(United States) Dave Kiley							13	11	18
Rank	Driver	(California) LBH		(Ohio) MOH		(Tennessee) NSH		(Tennessee) BRI		Points

Legend
Color	Result
Gold	Winner
Silver	2nd place
Bronze	3rd place
Green	4th–5th place (Top 5)
Light Blue	6th–10th place (Top 10)
Dark Blue	Finished (Outside Top 10)
Purple	Did not finish (DNF)
Red	Did not qualify (DNQ)
Brown	Withdrew (Wth)
Black	Disqualified (DSQ)
White	Did not start (DNS)
White	Race cancelled or abandoned (C)
Blank	Did not participate (DNP)
Blank	Driver replacement (Rpl)
Blank	Race not held (NH)
Blank	Not competing

**In-line notation**
**Bold**	Pole position (1 point; except Indy)
Italics	Ran fastest race lap
^{L}	Led race lap (1 point)
*	Led most race laps (2 points)
^{1–12}	Indy 500 "Fast Twelve" bonus points
^{c}	Qualifying canceled (no bonus point)
RY	Rookie of the Year
R	Rookie

Points	Position														
Points	1st	2nd	3rd	4th	5th	6th	7th	8th	9th	10th	11th	12th	13th	14th	15th
Heat	12	10	8	7	5	4	3	2	1						
Final	25	22	20	18	16	15	14	13	12	11	10	9	8	7	6

Bonuses
Most laps led	3
Position gained	1
Fastest qualifier	1
