= Ben Maier =

American racing driver (born 2008)

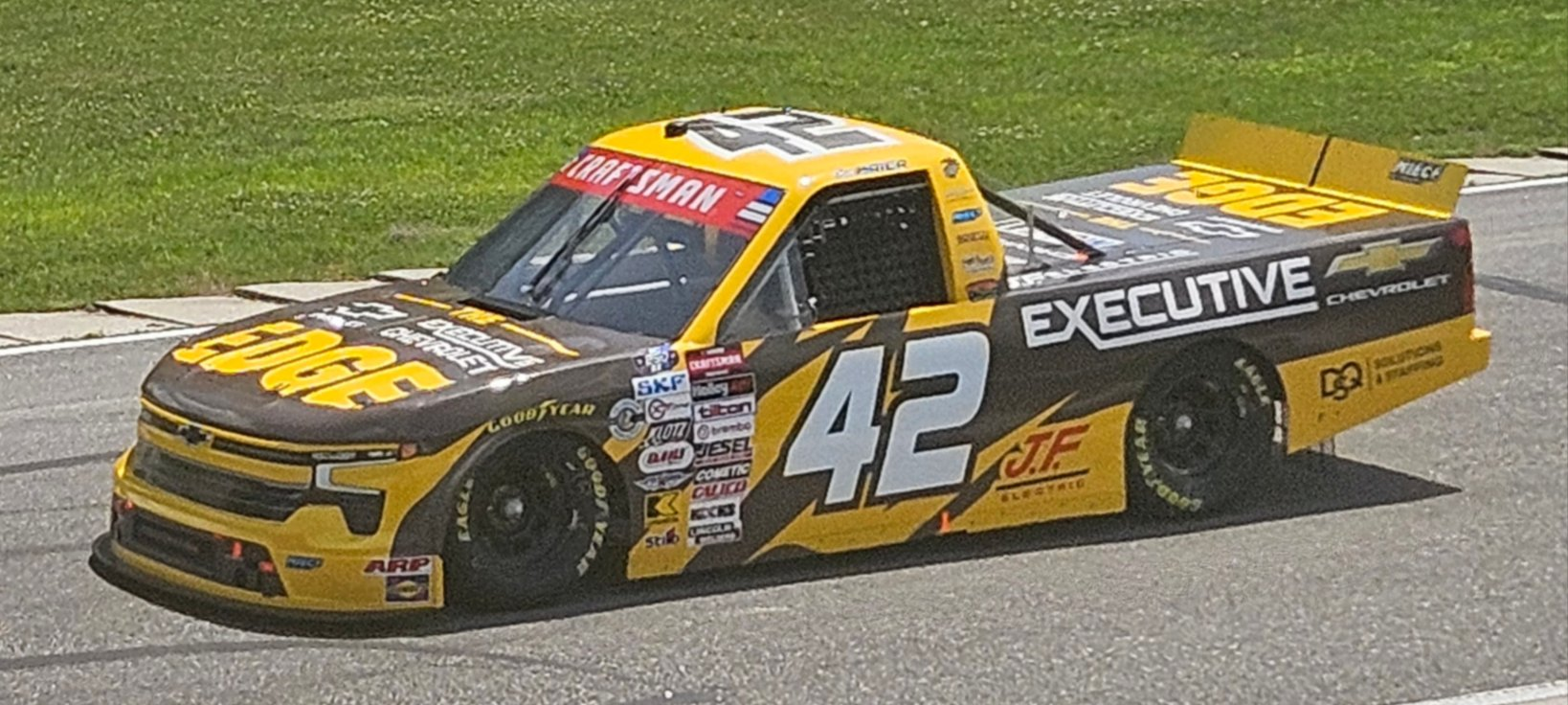
- Maier's No. 42 truck at Lime Rock Park in 2026
- Born: Benjamin Maier; December 28, 2008 (age 17); Chester, Maryland, U.S.
- Achievements: 2025 CARS Pro Late Model Tour Champion
- Awards: 2025 CARS Pro Late Model Tour Rookie of the Year

NASCAR FedEx Freight Truck Series career
- 5 races run over 2 years
- 2026 position: 49th
- Best finish: 48th (2025)
- First race: 2025 LiUNA! 150 (Lime Rock)
- Last race: 2026 Zero Carbon Bioethanol 150 (Phoenix)
Wins	Top tens	Poles
0	0	0
- Statistics up to date as of November 6, 2026.

Benjamin Maier (born December 26, 2008) is an American professional auto racing driver. He last competed part-time in the NASCAR Craftsman Truck Series, driving the No. 4/42 Chevrolet Silverado RST for Niece Motorsports, and the No. 76 Chevrolet Silverado RST for Freedom Racing Enterprises.

== Racing career ==
Maier has previously competed in series such as the Trans Am Series, the CRA JEGS All-Stars Tour, the Stadium Super Truck Series, and the Michelin Pilot Challenge.

In 2025, Maier ran full-time in the CARS Pro Late Model Tour for Setzer Racing and Development, where he won the championship and Rookie of the Year honors despite not winning a race.

That same year, it was revealed that Maier would make his debut in the NASCAR Craftsman Truck Series at Lime Rock Park, driving the No. 02 Chevrolet for Young's Motorsports.

On February 20, 2026, it was announced that Maier will return to the Truck Series at the St. Petersburg street circuit, driving the No. 4 Chevrolet for Niece Motorsports.

== Motorsports career results ==
=== Stock car career summary ===
Season	Series	Team	Races	Wins	Top 5	Top 10	Points	Position
2025	CARS Pro Late Model Tour	Setzer Racing & Development	13	0	7	10	474	**1st**
2025	NASCAR Craftsman Truck Series	Young's Motorsports	2	0	0	0	31	48th
2026	CARS Pro Late Model Tour	LowCountry Motorsports	3	0	1	3	104	22nd
2026	NASCAR Craftsman Truck Series	Niece Motorsports	2	0	0	0	42	49th
2026	NASCAR Craftsman Truck Series	Freedom Racing Enterprises	1	0	0	0	42	49th

=== NASCAR ===
(key) (Bold – Pole position awarded by qualifying time. Italics – Pole position earned by points standings or practice time. * – Most laps led.)

==== Craftsman Truck Series ====
NASCAR Craftsman Truck Series results
Year	Team	No.	Make	1	2	3	4	5	6	7	8	9	10	11	12	13	14	15	16	17	18	19	20	21	22	23	24	25	NCTC	Pts	Ref
2025	Young's Motorsports	02	Chevy	DAY	ATL	LVS	HOM	MAR	BRI	CAR	TEX	KAN	NWS	CLT	NSH	MCH	POC	LRP; 18	IRP	GLN	RCH	DAR	BRI	NHA	ROV; 25	TAL	MAR	PHO	48th	31	
2026	Niece Motorsports	4	Chevy	DAY	ATL	STP; 11	DAR	ROC	BRI	TEX	GLN	DOV	CLT	NSS	MCH	COR													49th	42	
2026	Niece Motorsports	42	Chevy														LRP; 33	NWS	IRP	RCH	NHA	BRI	KAN	CLT					49th	42	
2026	Freedom Racing Enterprises	76	Chevy																						PHO; 25	TAL	MAR	HOM	49th	42	

^{*} Season still in progress
^{1} Ineligible for series points

=== CARS Pro Late Model Tour ===
(key)

CARS Pro Late Model Tour results
Year	Team	No.	Make	1	2	3	4	5	6	7	8	9	10	11	12	13	CPLMTC	Pts	Ref
2025	Setzer Racing and Development	6M	Chevy	AAS; 4	CDL; 19	OCS; 7	**ACE**; 2	NWS; 9	**CRW**; 12	HCY; 5		**AND**; 4	FLC; 6	**SBO**; 2	**TCM**; 4	NWS; 4	1st	474	
2025	Setzer Racing and Development	6	Chevy								HCY; 11						1st	474	
2026	LowCountry Motorsports	67	Chevy	SNM	NSV; 9	CRW; 9	ACE; 4	NWS	HCY	AND	FLC	TCM	NPS	SBO			22nd	104	

=== Stadium Super Trucks ===
(key) (Bold – Pole position. Italics – Fastest qualifier. * – Most laps led.)

Stadium Super Trucks results
Year	1	2	3	4	5	6	7	8	SSTC	Pts	Ref
2022	LBH	LBH	MOH; 4	MOH; 4	NSH; 5	NSH; 3	BRI; 5	BRI; 6	7th	113	
2023	LBH	LBH	NSH; 6	NSH; 12					11th	29	
2024	LBH; 6	LBH; 5	ADE	ADE	ADE	ADE			9th	31	
