= Korean War Veterans Memorial Bridge =

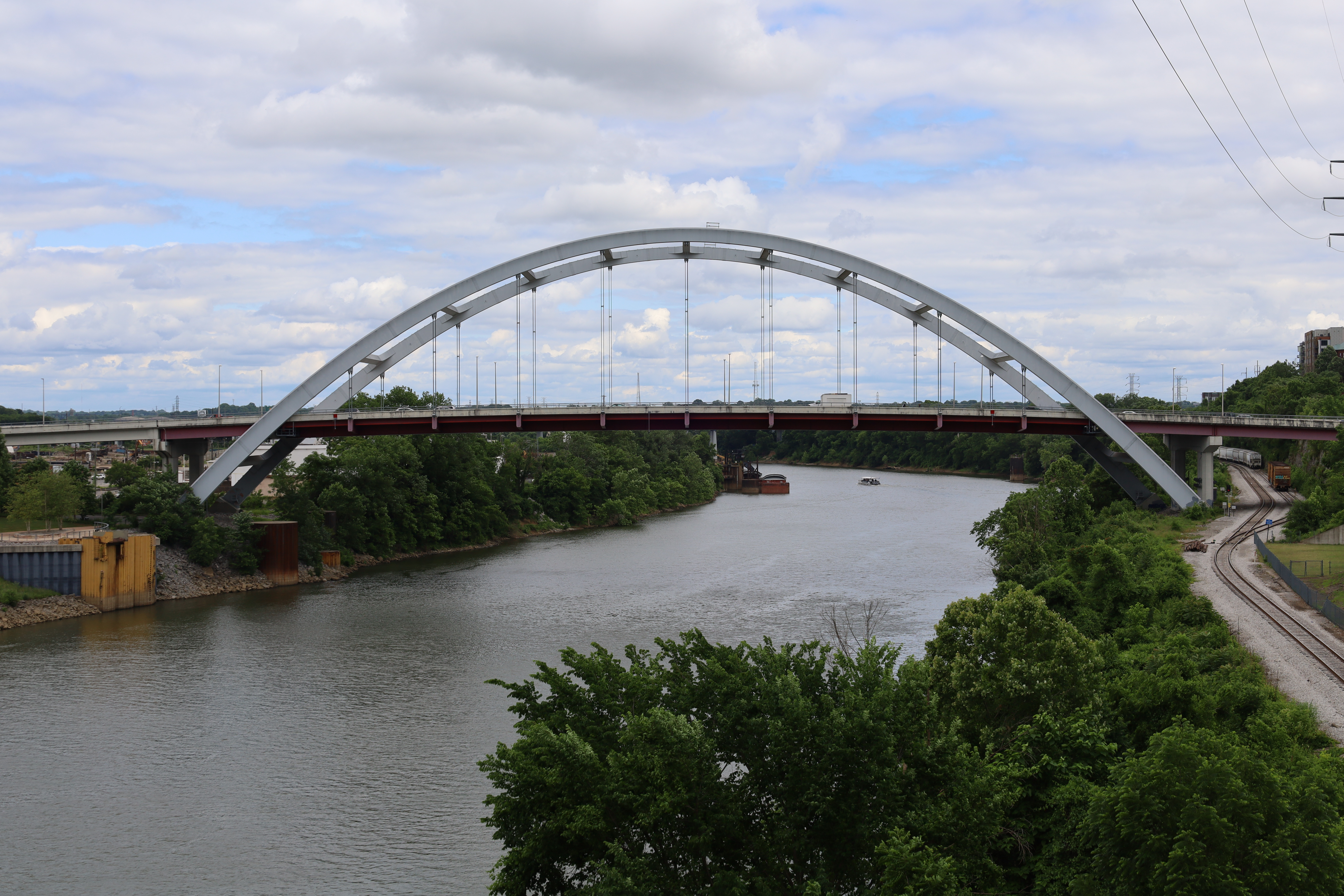
- Korean War Veterans Memorial Bridge in May 2022
- Coordinates: 36.1609°N 86.7694°W
- Carries: Korean Veterans Boulevard
- Crosses: Cumberland River
- Locale: Nashville, Tennessee

History
- Opened: 2004

Location
- Interactive map of Korean War Veterans Memorial Bridge

The Korean War Veterans Memorial Bridge, formerly known as Gateway Bridge, is a vehicular bridge that carries Korean Veterans Boulevard over the Cumberland River in Nashville, within the U.S. state of Tennessee.

== History ==
The idea of building the Gateway Bridge was conceived in 1996, as a way to turn the 1909 Shelby Street Bridge into a pedestrian bridge. The Shelby Street Bridge had later been renamed the Korean War Veterans of Tennessee Memorial Bridge, and a commemorative plaque was installed. In 1998, the Shelby Street Bridge was closed to traffic. When it was reopened as the John Seigenthaler Pedestrian Bridge in 2003, the memorial plaque had been removed.

Construction on the Gateway Bridge began in 2001, and it was completed in 2004. It was built by Ray Bell Construction. In 2006, it was renamed in honor of veterans of the Korean War.

The bridge was renovated with light-emitting diodes by Domingo Gonzalez Associates in 2016 The city of Nashville currently uses the LED display to celebrate popular holidays, such as Christmas, Martin Luther King Day, Veteran’s Day, among others. Residents of Davidson County can also submit a request for what colors will appear on the bridge.

The bridge is prominently featured as part of the Nashville Street Circuit. It is one of the few large bridges to be used on a street circuit anywhere in the world.

== Gallery ==
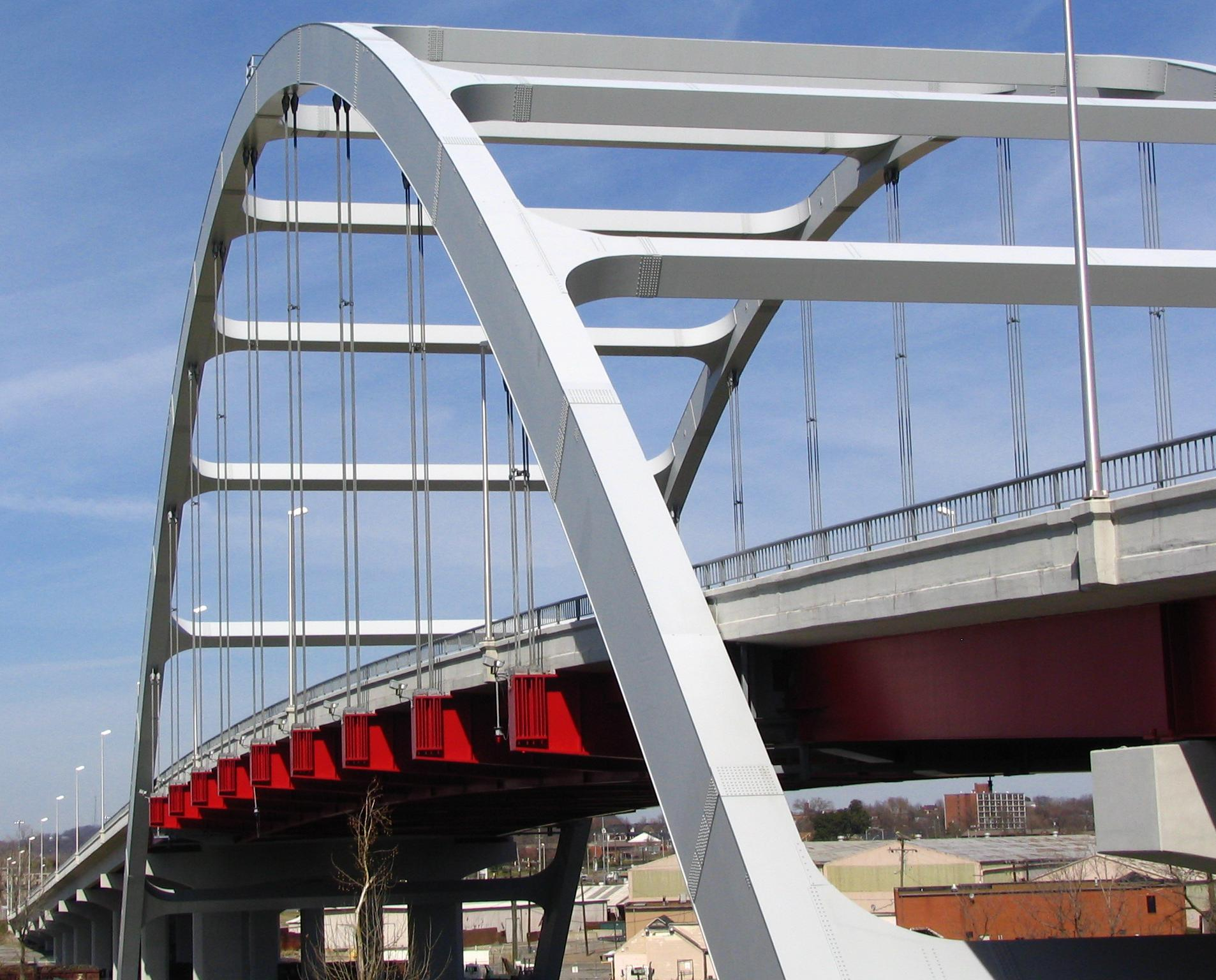
View of the bridge in March 2006

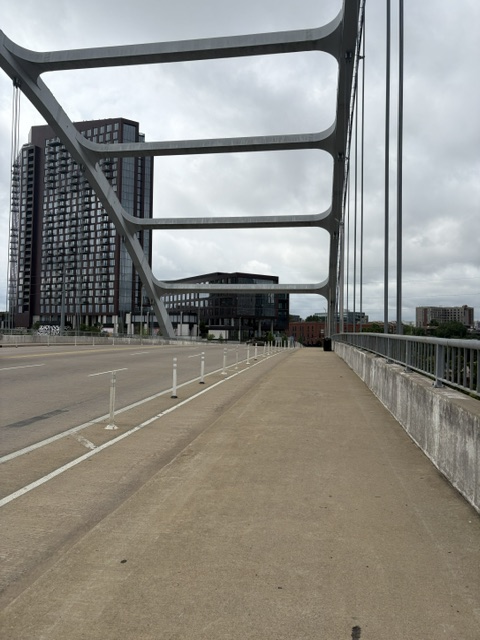
View from on the bridge in May 2026

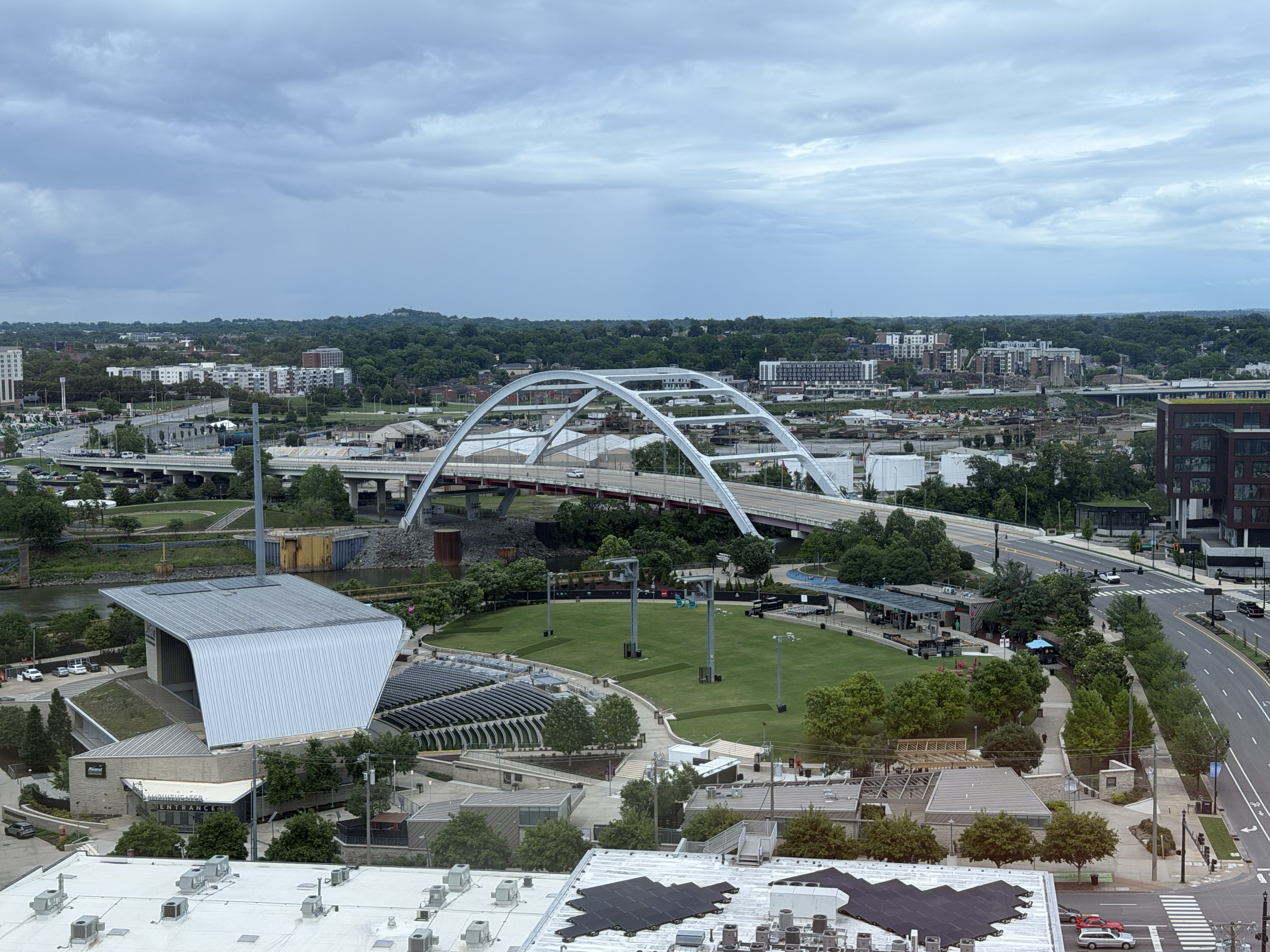
The bridge with the Ascend Amphitheater in the foreground in May 2026
