= Matthew Brabham =

Australian racing driver

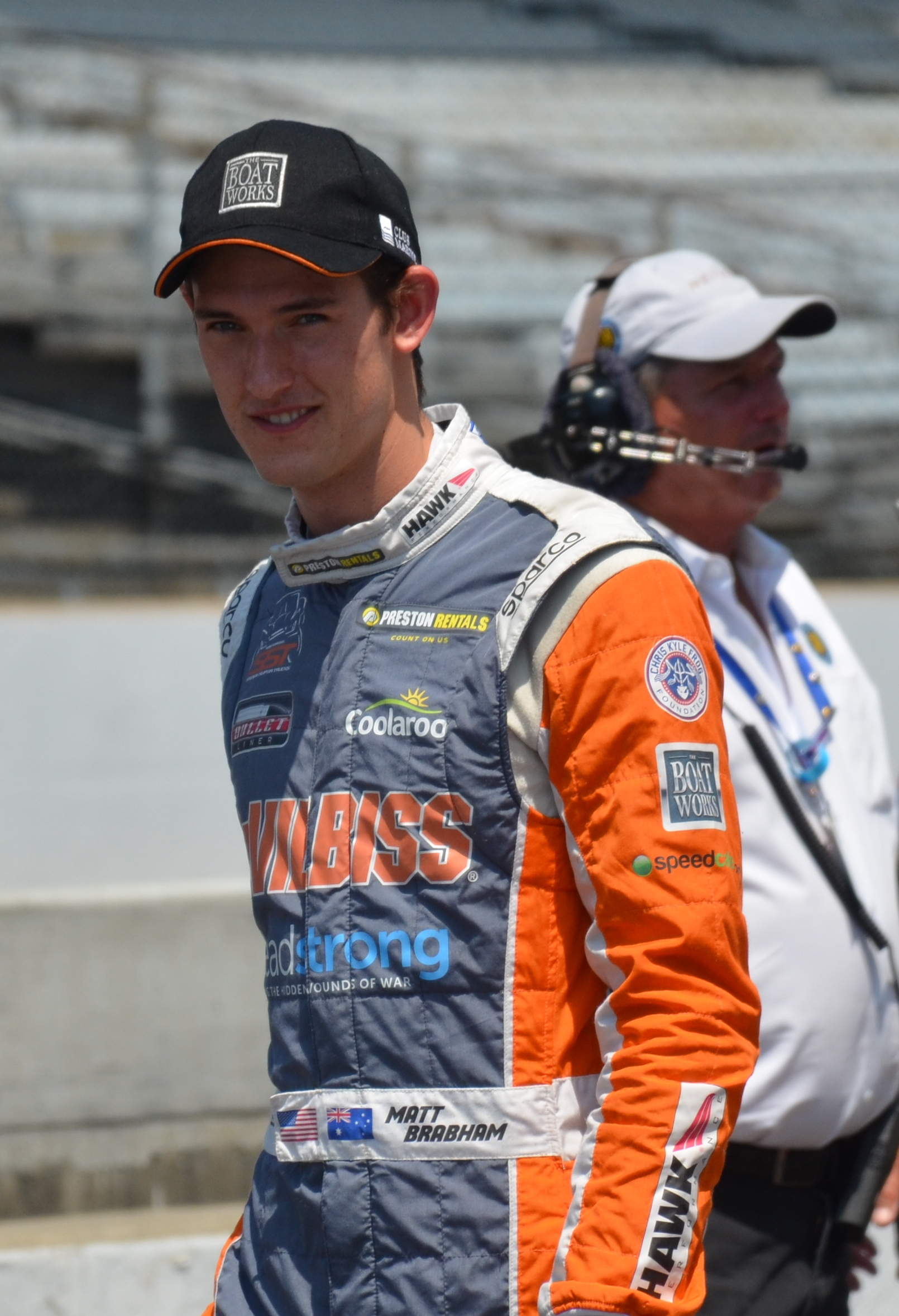
- Brabham at the Indianapolis Motor Speedway in 2018
- Nationality: (Australia) Australian (United States) American via dual nationality
- Born: Matthew Chase Brabham; 25 February 1994 (age 32) Boca Raton, Florida, U.S.
- Relatives: Sir Jack Brabham (grandfather); Geoff Brabham (father); David Brabham (uncle); Gary Brabham (uncle); Sam Brabham (cousin)
- Categorisation: FIA Gold (until 2016); FIA Silver (2017–)

Stadium Super Trucks career
- Debut season: 2015
- Car number: 83
- Starts: 121
- Wins: 27
- Podiums: 84
- Poles: 23
- Best finish: 1st in 2018, 2019, 2021

Previous series
- 2014–15 2013 2012 2010–11: Formula E Pro Mazda Championship; U.S. F2000 National Championship; Australian Formula Ford Championship

Championship titles
- 2018, 19, 21 2013 2012: Stadium Super Trucks; Pro Mazda Championship; U.S. F2000 National Championship

Awards
- 2012: Team USA Scholarship

IndyCar Series career
- 2 races run over 1 year
- 2016 position: 30th
- Best finish: 30th (2016)
- First race: 2016 Grand Prix of Indianapolis (Indianapolis)
- Last race: 2016 Indianapolis 500 (Indianapolis)
Wins	Podiums	Poles
0	0	0

Indy Lights career
- 37 races run over 4 years
- Team: No. 76 (Juncos Hollinger Racing)
- Best finish: 3rd (2022)
- First race: 2014 St. Petersburg 100 (St. Petersburg)
- Last race: 2023 Grand Prix of Monterey (WeatherTech Raceway Laguna Seca)
- First win: 2014 Grand Prix of Indianapolis (Indianapolis)
- Last win: 2022 Indy Lights Grand Prix of St. Petersburg (St. Petersburg)
Wins	Podiums	Poles
2	7	1
- Statistics up to date as of 13 May 2026.

Matthew Chase Brabham (born 25 February 1994) is an Australian-American racing driver who competes in the Trans-Am Series, driving the No. 20 Ford Mustang for Chris Dyson Racing. From 2015 to 2021, he was a regular in the Stadium Super Trucks, where he is a three-time series champion with titles in 2018, 2019 and 2021. He has also won championships in the Road to Indy ladder with the 2012 U.S. F2000 and 2013 Pro Mazda Championships.

Brabham is a third-generation racing driver; he is the son of Geoff Brabham and the grandson of three-time Formula One World Champion Sir Jack Brabham.

== Racing career ==
=== Early career ===
Born in Boca Raton, Florida, Brabham and his family moved to Australia in his youth. Much of Brabham's early exposure to racing came via watching his mother's jet ski competitions as he rarely attended his father and grandfather's auto races.

Brabham began kart racing in 2001 at the age of seven, starting in the Australian 'Midget' class. In 2007, he secured the Queensland State 'Rookie' Title, and in 2008, he went on to win both the New South Wales and Queensland State Junior National Light Titles, while also finishing second in the Australian and Melbourne City Titles. A year later, Brabham won the 'Junior Rotax' Young Guns Title, before graduating to Formula Ford racing towards the end of the year. In 2010, he competed in the Australian Formula Ford Championship with the CAMS Rising Star Team before moving to the Victorian State Formula Ford Series and the Australian National Championship with Sonic Motor Racing Services. In the state series, he won eight out of twelve races, including seven in a row, while he scored two wins, two runner-up finishes, and a pole position in the national division.

=== Road to Indy ===
For 2012, Brabham joined Cape Motorsports with Wayne Taylor Racing, to compete in the U.S. F2000 National Championship. Brabham won the title over his teammate Spencer Pigot by seven points, capturing four wins from eleven podium finishes in the fourteen race season. In doing so he won a $350,000 USD scholarship through the Road to Indy to race in the Star Mazda Championship in 2013.

Brabham signed to drive the No. 27 car for Andretti Autosport for the 2013 Star Mazda Championship. Brabham won the championship with two races remaining, capturing a series-record 11th win in his rookie season. Brabham's title secured a scholarship to compete in Indy Lights in 2014.

Brabham remained with Andretti Autosport to challenge for the Indy Lights title in 2014. He won one race and collected four podiums and ten top-fives in fourteen races to finish fourth in the overall standings. Brabham attributed his lower points finish than hoped to his lack of experience, having progressed through three levels of the Road to Indy in as many years, and his difficulties in adjusting to the series' use of Cooper Tires after mainly racing with Firestone. Financial issues prevented him from completing a second season in 2015. He won eighteen of 47 career Road to Indy races (approximately 38.3 percent) from 2012 to 2015, the second highest winning percentage in the ladder's history behind Kyle Kirkwood's 62.5 percent as of 2021.

In October 2021, Brabham rejoined Andretti's Indy Lights programme for the Chris Griffis Memorial Test at Indianapolis, during which he set the tenth-best time. Three months later, he formally committed to the 2022 Indy Lights season with the team; at the age of 28, he was the oldest driver in the field. He won the season opener at St. Petersburg after passing teammate Christian Rasmussen, who ran out of fuel, on the penultimate lap.

=== Formula E and IndyCar ===
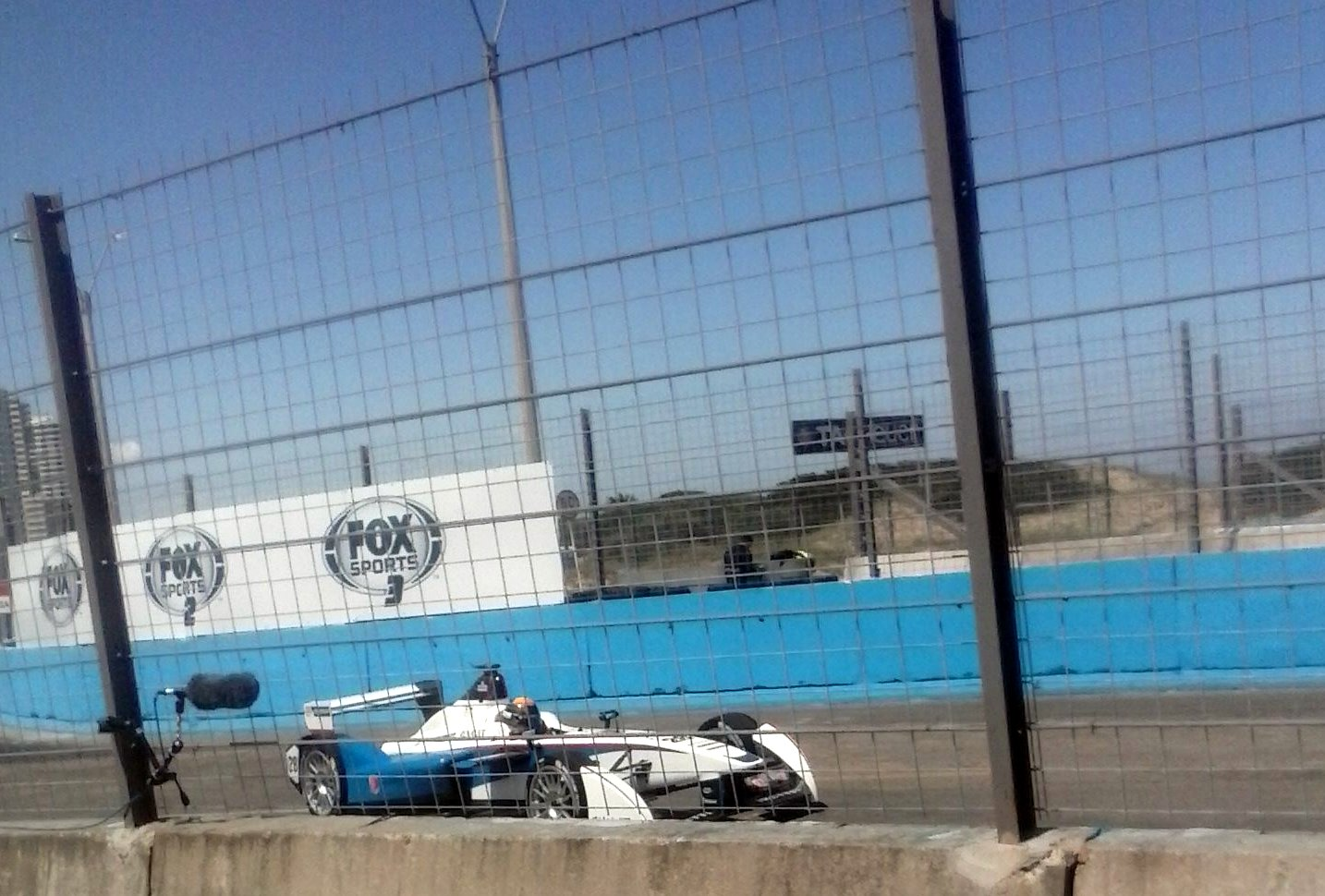
Brabham in Formula E at the 2014 Punta del Este ePrix

In November 2014, Brabham competed in the second round of the inaugural Formula E world championship in Putrajaya, Malaysia. He replaced Charles Pic for Andretti Autosport. At the age of 20, Brabham became the youngest driver to compete in Formula E.

In 2016, Brabham made his Indianapolis 500 debut, driving the No. 61 for Pirtek Team Murray. He qualified 26th and finished 22nd. Although he has not run another IndyCar race as of 2021, he remains involved as the driver of IndyCar's two-seater for guests at race weekends.

=== Stadium Super Trucks ===
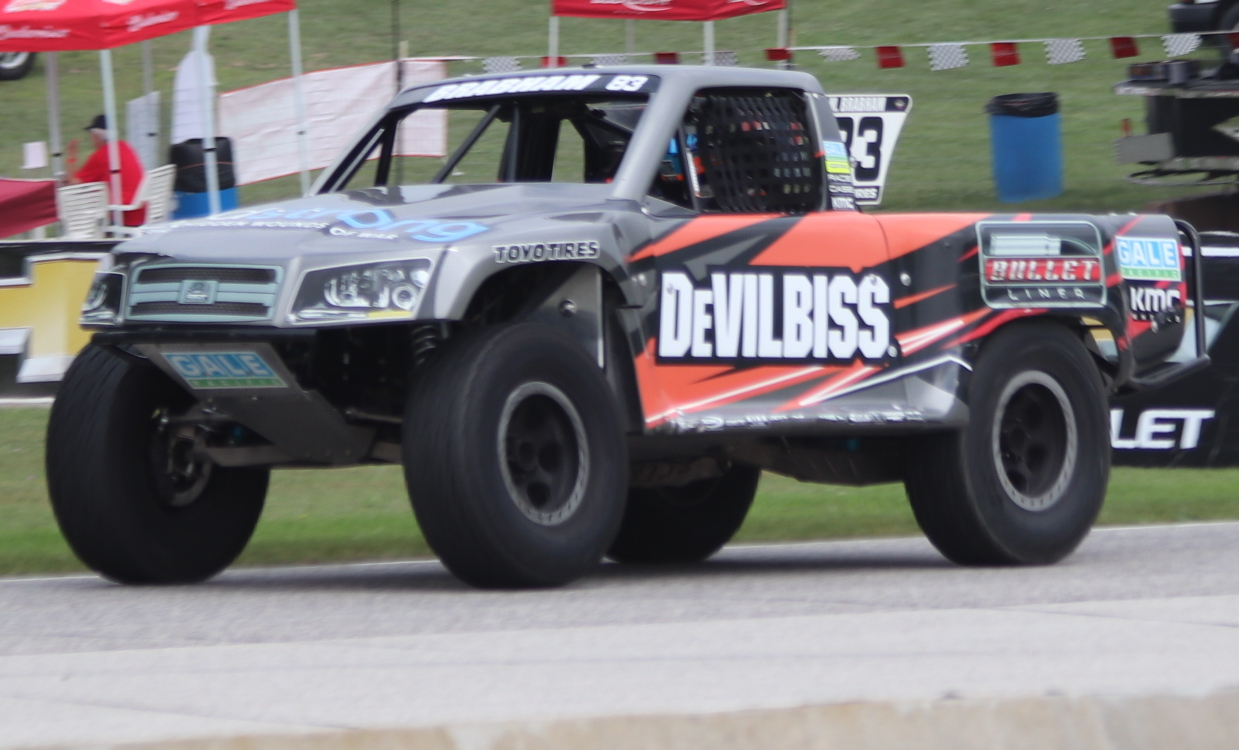
Brabham's Stadium Super Truck racing to a round win at Road America in 2018

In 2015, Brabham made his Stadium Super Trucks debut at Honda Indy Toronto; Brabham, who was at the track working as a driver coach, received the opportunity to race after Paul Tracy became unavailable due to television obligations. He finished sixth and fourth in the weekend's two races. Later in the year, he competed at the Gold Coast 600, Valvoline Raceway, and the Sydney 500 events, recording runner-up finishes at Gold Coast and Valvoline.

Brabham began racing in the series on a full-time basis in 2016. In June, he swept the Detroit Belle Isle Grand Prix rounds. He later joined Team Traxxas, driving the No. 83 alongside Sheldon Creed. Brabham scored his third win of the season when he held off Creed at Toronto. He finished second in the 2016 standings, 75 points behind Creed, with three wins and sixteen podiums.

For the 2017 season, Brabham acquired sponsorship from Safecraft Safety Equipment. His first win of the year came in the Firestone Grand Prix of St. Petersburg, where he became the first non-Australian SST race winner, followed by victories at the Grand Prix of Long Beach, Hidden Valley Raceway, Beijing National Stadium, and Watkins Glen International. He finished runner up to Paul Morris by one point.

Brabham continued in the series for a fourth year in 2018. His first win of the season came at Adelaide Street Circuit's third race, where he capitalised on Robby Gordon entering the final corner too wide on the last lap. Further triumphs came at Long Beach, Barbagallo Raceway, Texas Motor Speedway, Road America, and Sydney Motorsport Park. Brabham battled with Gavin Harlien for the championship throughout the season, and a victory at the season-ending 2019 Race of Champions clinched him the 2018 title. His six wins led the series in 2018.

Brabham opened the 2019 season by winning the second race of the Circuit of the Americas weekend despite suffering from a foodborne illness the previous night. After winning again at Long Beach when he beat Creed, Brabham went on a three-race string of runner-up finishes; his two second-place runs at Toronto earned him that weekend's overall win. Additional wins came at Mid-Ohio Sports Car Course and Portland International Raceway. In the series' Australian return at Gold Coast to end the year, Brabham was involved in last-lap incidents in both races: in the first round, he spun race leader Toby Price in turn 11 that led to Gordon winning, while he dodged contact between Morris and Cole Potts to win the second. He finished the year with a series-high six wins and thirteen podiums to clinch his second straight title.

While the 2020 campaign did not track standings due to the COVID-19 pandemic, Brabham won twice at Adelaide and Road America. The Adelaide victory, which came in the second of three races that weekend, saw him beat Gordon to the finish by .0351 seconds. A third championship came in 2021 as he finished on the podium in all ten races with a sweep of the second Mid-Ohio weekend. From the 2019 Gold Coast round and across the next two seasons, Brabham was the fastest driver in every qualifying session until the 2021 season finale at Long Beach where Gordon snapped his streak at five.

Although Brabham did not commit to a full 2022 season due to Indy Lights, he continued to make occasional starts as SST's prize money structure provides him with a sustainable salary. His first race weekend as a part-time SST driver was at Long Beach.

=== Supercars ===
In 2017, Brabham returned to Australia to race in the Supercars Championship, making his debut at the 2017 Perth SuperSprint for Lucas Dumbrell Motorsport in place of Taz Douglas. He was scheduled to race as a co-driver for the Team 18 team in the 2018 Endurance Cup but this drive was taken by Jason Bright.

=== Sports car racing ===
In 2017, Brabham, Bill Hynes and Alexandre Prémat competed in the Utah Motorsports Campus 6 Hour Enduro, where they won EXR Racing Series class and finished tenth overall.

Brabham entered the Bathurst 12 Hour in 2018, driving a BMW M4 GT4 that he shared with Tony Longhurst and Aaron Seton. The three dominated the Class C to win. Later in the year, he entered the Pirelli World Challenge's GT class, driving for CRP Racing at Portland International Raceway. He followed this up with another appearance at the final round in Utah.

On November 7, 2021, Brabham made his Trans-Am Series debut at Circuit of the Americas. While filling in for series regular Chris Dyson, in the No. 20 Ford Mustang, he caught and passed seven-time series champion Ernie Francis Jr. in the final fifty feet of the last lap for the win.

Since starting his Trans-Am campaign, Brabham has been consistent behind the wheel while piloting the Dyson Racing Ford Mustangs.

== Personal life ==
Brabham's family is heavily involved in motorsports, with father Geoff being a former CART driver while mother Roseina is a jet ski champion. He has raced against his parents in historic motorsport and jet skis. Grandfather Jack Brabham won three Formula One World Championships, while uncle David has won championships in sports cars and both Geoff and David have both won the 24 Hours of Le Mans.

Brabham's wife Kimberly Brabham has worked as a racing spokesmodel and currently a real estate agent. They married on December 12, 2025 in Florida and reside in Indianapolis with their dog Brumby.

== Racing record ==
=== Career summary ===
==== Karting career summary ====
Season	Series	Position
2008	NSW Open Sprint Kart Championships - Junior Clubman	5th
2008	NSW Open Sprint Kart Championships - Junior National Light	**1st**
2008	Queensland Sprint Kart Championships - Junior Clubman	4th
2008	Queensland Sprint Kart Championships - Junior National Light	**1st**
2008	Victorian Open Kart Championships - Junior National Light	5th
2008	Victorian Open Kart Championships - Junior Clubman	16th
2008	Australian National Sprint Kart Championship - Junior Clubman	18th
2008	Australian National Sprint Kart Championship - Junior National Light	**2nd**

==== Racing career summary ====
Season	Series	Team	Races	Wins	Poles	F/Laps	Podiums	Points	Position
2009	Victorian Formula Ford Championship	Minda Motorsport	6	0	0	0	2	110	9th
2010	Australian Formula Ford Championship	Minda Motorsport	22	0	0	0	0	30	14th
2010	Victorian Formula Ford Championship	Minda Motorsport	9	1	0	2	3	194	5th
2011	Australian Formula Ford Championship	Sonic Motor Racing Services	9	2	1	2	4	95	9th
2011	Victorian Formula Ford Championship	Sonic Motor Racing Services	9	6	2	3	6	203	6th
2012	U.S. F2000 Winterfest	Cape Motorsports with Wayne Taylor Racing	6	1	1	2	4	135	**3rd**
2012	U.S. F2000 National Championship	Cape Motorsports with Wayne Taylor Racing	14	4	2	8	11	339	**1st**
2012	Formula Renault BARC	Cliff Dempsey Racing	2	0	0	0	0	0	NC†
2013	Pro Mazda Championship	Andretti Autosport	16	13	7	13	15	466	**1st**
2014	Indy Lights	Andretti Autosport	14	1	1	2	4	424	4th
2014–15	Formula E	Andretti Autosport Formula E Team	2	0	0	0	0	0	31st
2015	Indy Lights	Andretti Autosport	3	0	0	1	0	35	13th
2015	Stadium Super Trucks	Toyo Tires, UFD Racing	7	0	0	0	2	115	10th
2016	Stadium Super Trucks	UFD Racing, Traxxas	21	3	1	4	16	570	**2nd**
2016	IndyCar Series	Pirtek Team Murray	2	0	0	0	0	37	30th
2017	Stadium Super Trucks	Safecraft Safety Equipment	22	5	3	8	15	545	**2nd**
2017	Virgin Australia Supercars Championship	Lucas Dumbrell Motorsport	2	0	0	0	0	57	55th
2018	Stadium Super Trucks	Carlisle Fluid Technologies	20	6	1	10	14	540	**1st**
2018	Pirelli World Challenge SprintX GT Championship Series	CRP Racing	4	0	0	0	0	36	16th
2019	Stadium Super Trucks	Carlisle Fluid Technologies	19	5	0	8	13	476	**1st**
2019	Pirelli World Challenge GT4 America Series	CRP Racing	5	0	0	0	0	34	12th
2019	Australian S5000 Championship	MTEC Motorsport	3	0	0	0	0	N/A	N/A
2020	Stadium Super Trucks	Carlisle Fluid Technologies	5	2	0	5	4	133	**2nd**
2021	Stadium Super Trucks	Carlisle Fluid Technologies	10	2	0	8	10	296	**1st**
2021	Trans-Am Series - TA		1	1	0	1	1	33	16th
2022	Indy Lights	Andretti Autosport	14	2	0	3	7	471	**3rd**
2022	Stadium Super Trucks	MasterMine, Continental Tire	4	1	0	0	3	117	6th
2022	Trans-Am Series - TA		4	2	0	2	4	117	6th
2023	Stadium Super Trucks	Continental Tire	4	2	1	0	3	96	**2nd**
2023	Trans-Am Series - GTX	Gym Weed	6	2	2	4	5	587	6th
2023	Indy NXT	Juncos Hollinger Racing	5	0	0	0	0	159	16th
2023	Indy NXT	Cape Motorsports	1	0	0	0	0	159	16th
2024	IMSA SportsCar Championship - LMP2	AO Racing	5	0	2	0	0	1342	21st
2024	Stadium Super Trucks	Continental Tire	4	0	1	0	3	101	**2nd**
2025	Trans-Am Series - TA	Gym Weed	4	2	1	2	3	587*	7th*
2025	IMSA SportsCar Championship - LMP2	Team Tonis	1	0	0	0	0	238	55th
2025	Michelin Pilot Challenge - GS	CDR Valkyrie	1	0	0	0	0	250*	47th*
2025	Stadium Super Trucks	Speed UTV	2	0	1	0	1	53	**3rd**
2026	Trans-Am Series - TA								

=== U.S. F2000 National Championship ===
(key)

Year	Team	1	2	3	4	5	6	7	8	9	10	11	12	13	14	Rank	Points
2012	Cape Motorsports Wayne Taylor Racing	SEB; 1	SEB; 2	STP; 2	STP; 2	LOR; 2	MOH; 3	MOH; 25	ROA; 1	ROA; 1	ROA; 3	BAL; 2	BAL; 1	VIR; 4	VIR; 8	**1st**	**339**

=== Pro Mazda Championship ===
(key)

Year	Team	1	2	3	4	5	6	7	8	9	10	11	12	13	14	15	16	Rank	Points
2013	Andretti Autosport	COA; 3	COA; 1	STP; 1	STP; 1	**IND**; 1	**IOW**; 1	**TOR**; 1	**TOR**; 1	MOS; 3	MOS; 9	**MOH**; 1	**MOH**; 1	**TRO**; 1	TRO; 1	**HOU**; 1	HOU; 1	**1st**	**466**

=== Indy Lights ===
(key) (Races in bold indicate pole position) (Races in italics indicate fastest lap) (Races with ^{L} indicate a race lap led) (Races with * indicate most race laps led)

Year	Team	1	2	3	4	5	6	7	8	9	10	11	12	13	14	15	16	Rank	Points
2014	Andretti Autosport	STP; 9	LBH; 3	ALA; 4	ALA; 12	**IMS**; 1	IMS; 4	INDY; 2	POC; 5	TOR; 4	MOH; 5	MOH; 12	MIL; 2	SNM; 6	SNM; 5			4th	424
2015	Andretti Autosport	STP; 11	STP; 7	LBH; 11	ALA	ALA	IMS	IMS	INDY	TOR	TOR	MIL	IOW	MOH	MOH	LAG	LAG	13th	35
2022	Andretti Autosport	STP; 1^{L}	ALA; 7	IMS; 10	IMS; 9	DET; 3	DET; 4	RDA; 6	MOH; 2	IOW; 3	NSC; 4	GAT; 1^{L}	POR; 2	LAG; 8	LAG; 3			3rd	471
2023	Juncos Hollinger Racing	STP	BAR	IMS	DET	DET	RDA	MOH	IOW; 4			GMP; 7	POR; 9	LAG; 5	LAG; 4			16th	159
2023	Cape Motorsports									NSH; 13	IMS							16th	159

=== Complete Formula E results ===
(key) (Races in bold indicate pole position; races in italics indicate fastest lap)

Year	Team	Chassis	Powertrain	1	2	3	4	5	6	7	8	9	10	11	Pos	Points
2014–15	Andretti Autosport	Spark SRT01-e	SRT01-e	BEI	PUT; 13	PDE; Ret	BUE	MIA	LBH	MCO	BER	MSC	LDN	LDN	31st	0

=== IndyCar Series ===
Year	Team	Chassis	No.	Engine	1	2	3	4	5	6	7	8	9	10	11	12	13	14	15	16	Rank	Points	Ref
2016	Pirtek Team Murray	Dallara DW12	61	Chevrolet	STP	PHX	LBH	ALA	IMS; 16	INDY; 22	DET	DET	RDA	IOW	TOR	MOH	POC	TXS	WGL	SNM	30th	37	

==== Indianapolis 500 ====
Year	Chassis	Engine	Start	Finish	Team
2016	Dallara	Chevrolet	27	22	Pirtek Team Murray

=== Complete S5000 results ===
Year	Series	Team	1	2	3	4	5	6	Position	Points
2019	Exhibition	MTEC Motorsport	SAN; R1; 4	SAN; R2; Ret	SAN; M 5	BMP; R1	BMP; R2	BMP; M	N/C	-

=== Stadium Super Trucks ===
(key) (Bold – Pole position. Italics – Fastest qualifier. * – Most laps led.)

Stadium Super Trucks results
Year	1	2	3	4	5	6	7	8	9	10	11	12	13	14	15	16	17	18	19	20	21	22	SSTC	Pts	Ref
2015	ADE	ADE	ADE	STP	STP	LBH	DET	DET	DET	AUS	TOR; 6	TOR; 4	OCF	OCF	OCF	SRF; 2	SRF; 8	SRF; 10	SRF; 10	SYD; 2	MGM	MGM	10th	115	
2016	ADE; 5	ADE; 5	ADE; 3	STP; 2	STP; 5	**LBH**; 2	LBH; 3	DET; 1	DET; C^{1}	DET; 1*	TOW; 3	TOW; 4	TOW; 2	TOR; 1	TOR; 2	CLT; 2	CLT; 4	OCF; 3	OCF; 2	SRF; 3	SRF; 2	SRF; 2	2nd	570	
2017	ADE; 3	ADE; 12	ADE; 2	STP; 9	**STP**; 1*	LBH; 1	LBH; 2	PER; 10	PER; 3	PER; 4	DET; 2	DET; 2	TEX; 5	TEX; 3	HID; 3	HID; 1*	HID; 3	BEI; 1	GLN; 3	GLN; 1*	ELS; 5	ELS; 8	2nd	545	
2018	ELS; 6	ELS; 2	ADE; 3	ADE; 3	ADE; 1	LBH; 4	LBH; 1*	PER; 7	PER; 4	DET; 4	DET; 2	TEX; 10	TEX; 1	ROA; 2	ROA; 1	**SMP**; 1	SMP; 9	HLN; 2	HLN; 2	MXC; 2	MXC; 1		1st	540	
2019	COA; 6	COA; 1	TEX; 5	TEX; 2	LBH; 1*	LBH; 2	TOR; 2	TOR; 2	MOH; 3	MOH; 2	MOH; 7	MOH; 1*	ROA; 3*	ROA; 8	ROA; 4	POR; 5	POR; 1*	SRF; 2	SRF; 1*				1st	415	
2020	ADE; 3	ADE; 1	ADE; 3	ROA; 11	ROA; 1*																		N/A^{2}	–	
2021	STP; 2	STP; 2	MOH; 2	MOH; 3	MOH; 1	MOH; 1	NSH; 2	NSH; 3	LBH; 2	LBH; 3													1st	296	
2022	LBH; 4	LBH; 2	MOH	MOH	NSH; 1	NSH; 2	BRI	BRI															6th	117	
2023	LBH; 1*	LBH; 1	NSH; 13	NSH; 3																			2nd	96	
2024	LBH; 3	LBH; 2	ADE; 3	ADE; 4																			2nd	101	
2025	LBH; 4	LBH; 2																					3rd	53	
2026	LBH; 10	**LBH**; 1*																					-*	-*	

^{*} Season in progress.
^{1} The race was abandoned after Matt Mingay suffered serious injuries in a crash on lap three.
^{2} Standings were not recorded by the series for the 2020 season.

=== Supercars Championship results ===
Supercars results
Year	Team	Car	1	2	3	4	5	6	7	8	9	10	11	12	13	14	15	16	17	18	19	20	21	22	23	24	25	26	27	28	29	30	31	32	Position	Points
2017	Lucas Dumbrell Motorsport	Holden VF Commodore	ADE; R1	ADE; R2	SYM; R3	SYM; R4	PHI; R5	PHI; R6	BAR; R7; 25	BAR; R8; 26	WIN; R9	WIN; R10	HID; R11	HID; R12	TOW; R13	TOW; R14	QLD; R15	QLD; R16	SMP; R17	SMP; R18	SAN; R19	BAT; R20	SUR; R21	SUR; R22	PUK; R23	PUK; R24	NEW; R25	NEW; R26							55th	57
2018	Team 18	Holden ZB Commodore	ADE; R1	ADE; R2	MEL; R3	MEL; R4	MEL; R5	MEL; R6	SYM; R7	SYM; R8	PHI; R9	PHI; R10	BAR; R11; PO	BAR; R12; PO	WIN; R13; PO	WIN; R14; PO	HID; R15	HID; R16	TOW; R17	TOW; R18	QLD; R19; PO	QLD; R20; PO	SMP; R21	BEN; R22	BEN; R23	SAN; QR	SAN; R24	BAT; R25	SUR; R26	SUR; R27	PUK; R28	PUK; R29	NEW; R30	NEW; R31	N/A	0

=== Complete Bathurst 12 Hour results ===
Year	Team	Co-drivers	Car	Class	Laps	Overall position	Class position
2018	(Australia) Boat Works Racing	(Australia) Tony Longhurst (Australia) Aaron Seton	BMW M4 GT4	C	250	22nd	**1st**

=== Pirelli World Challenge results ===
Year	Team	Make	Class	1	2	3	4	5	6	7	8	9	10	11	12	13	14	15	Rank	Points
2018	CRP Racing	Mercedes-AMG GT3	GT3 SprintX – GT Pro	AUS1	AUS2	VIR1	VIR2	LRP1	LRP2	POR1; 7	POR2; 12	UTA1; Ret	UTA2; 8						16th	36
2019	CRP Racing	Porsche Cayman GT4 CS MR	GT4 SprintX – Pro	STP1	STP2	LBH; 8	VIR1	VIR2	MOS1	MOS2	SON1; 5	SON2; 4	WGL1	WGL2	ELK1	ELK2	LVS1; 6	LVS2; Ret	12th	34

=== Trans-Am Series results ===
Year	Team	Make	Class	1	2	3	4	5	6	7	8	9	10	11	12	13	14	15	Rank	Points
2021	ALTWELL CBD	Ford Mustang	TA	SEB	ChR	RDA	SON	LGS	LRP	MOH	ROA	BIR	NSC	MOS; C	WAT1	WAT2	VIR	AUS; 1	16th	33
2022	ALTWELL CBD	Ford Mustang	TA	SEB	ChR	RDA	LGS	SON	LRP; 2	MOH; 1	ROA	WAT	VIR; 1	AUS; 2					6th	117
2023	Gym Weed	Ford Mustang	GTX	SEB; 1	NOL; 2	RDA; 9	**LRP**; **3**	**IMS**; **1**	MOH; 2	ROA; DNS	WAT	GAT	VIR	AUS; DNS					6th	587
2025	Gym Weed	Ford Mustang	TA	SEB	RDA; 1	SON	LGS	LRP; 10	**MOH**; **1**	**ROA**; **2**	WAT	MOS	VIR	BMP	AUS				7th*	406

=== Complete IMSA SportsCar Championship results ===
(key) (Races in bold indicate pole position; results in italics indicate fastest lap)

Year	Team	Class	Make	Engine	1	2	3	4	5	6	7	Pos.	Points
2024	AO Racing	LMP2	Oreca 07	Gibson GK428 4.2 L V8	DAY; 8	**SEB**; 11	**WGL**; 7	MOS	ELK	IMS; 4	PET; 7	21st	1342
2025	Team Tonis	LMP2	Oreca 07	Gibson GK428 4.2 L V8	DAY	SEB	WGL	MOS	ELK; 10	IMS	PET	55th	238

Sporting positions
Preceded by Petri Suvanto	U.S. F2000 National Championship; Champion; 2012	Succeeded by Scott Hargrove
Preceded by Jack Hawksworth	Pro Mazda Championship; Champion; 2013	Succeeded by Spencer Pigot
Preceded by Paul Morris	Stadium Super Trucks; Champion; 2018, 2019 & 2021	Succeeded by Gavin Harlien
