= Gavin Harlien =

American off-road racing driver

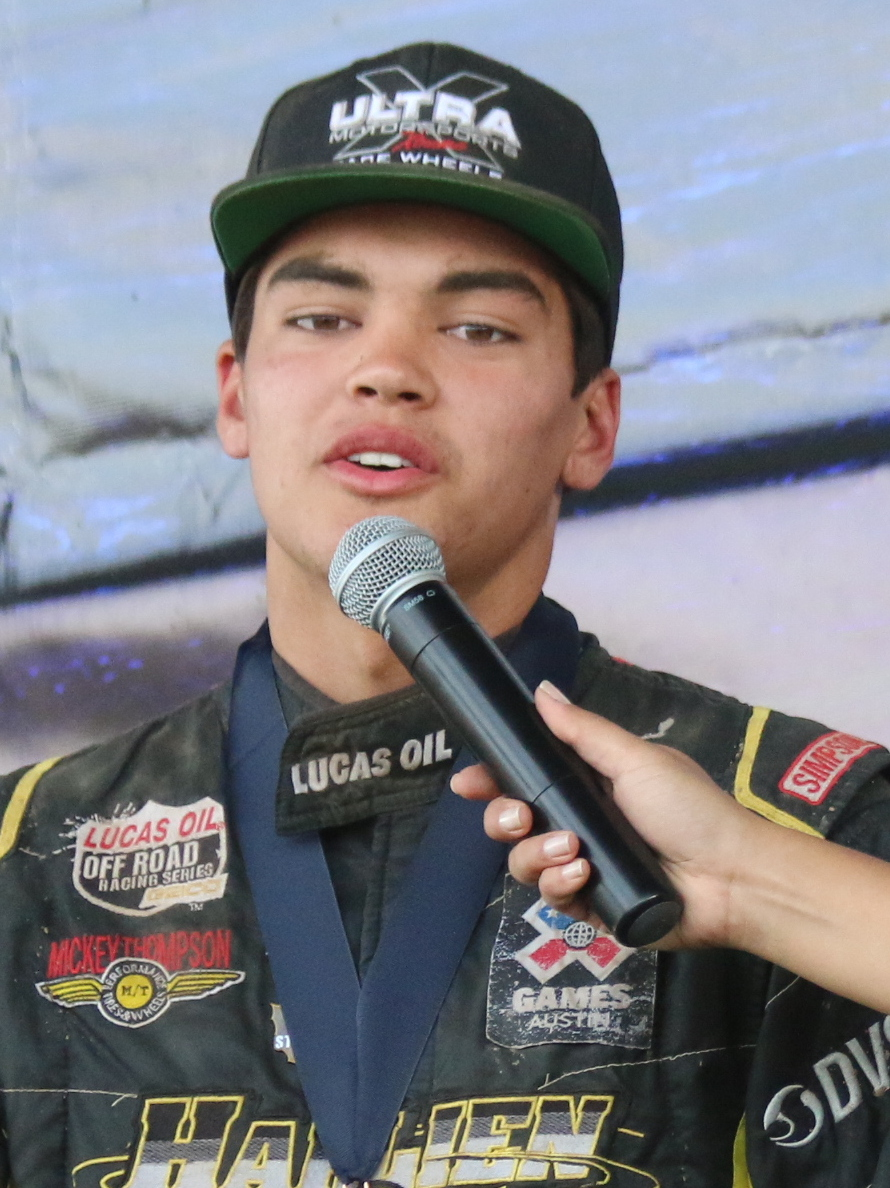
- Harlien in 2016
- Born: August 20, 1999 (age 27) Austin, Texas, U.S.

Stadium Super Trucks career
- Debut season: 2014
- Car number: 1
- Starts: 80
- Championships: 1
- Wins: 12
- Podiums: 39
- Poles: 2
- Best finish: 1st in 2022–2023
- Finished last season: 1st (2023)

Previous series
- 2019 2015 2014 2012–2013: ARCA Menards Series; GRC Lites; LOORRS Pro Lite Truck; LOORRS Modified Kart

Championship titles
- 2022–2023: Stadium Super Trucks

Awards
- 2014 2012: LOORRS Pro Lite Truck Rookie of the Year; LOORRS Modified Kart Rookie of the Year
- Statistics up to date as of May 20, 2024.

Gavin Harlien (born August 20, 1999) is an American professional off-road racing driver. He has raced in the Lucas Oil Off Road Racing Series, Global RallyCross Championship, and Stadium Super Trucks. Harlien has also competed in stock car racing like the ARCA Menards Series.

Harlien won the Stadium Super Trucks championship in 2022 and 2023.

== Racing career ==
Harlien began competing in off-road racing when he was 11. In 2012, he was named Rookie of the Year in the Lucas Oil Off Road Racing Series' (LOORRS) Modified Kart class; when he moved up to LOORRS' Pro Lite Trucks in 2014, he had won four Modified Kart races with 23 podium finishes. In the Pro Lite Trucks, he won 2014 Rookie of the Year honors with a best finish of second at Lake Elsinore Motorsports Park.

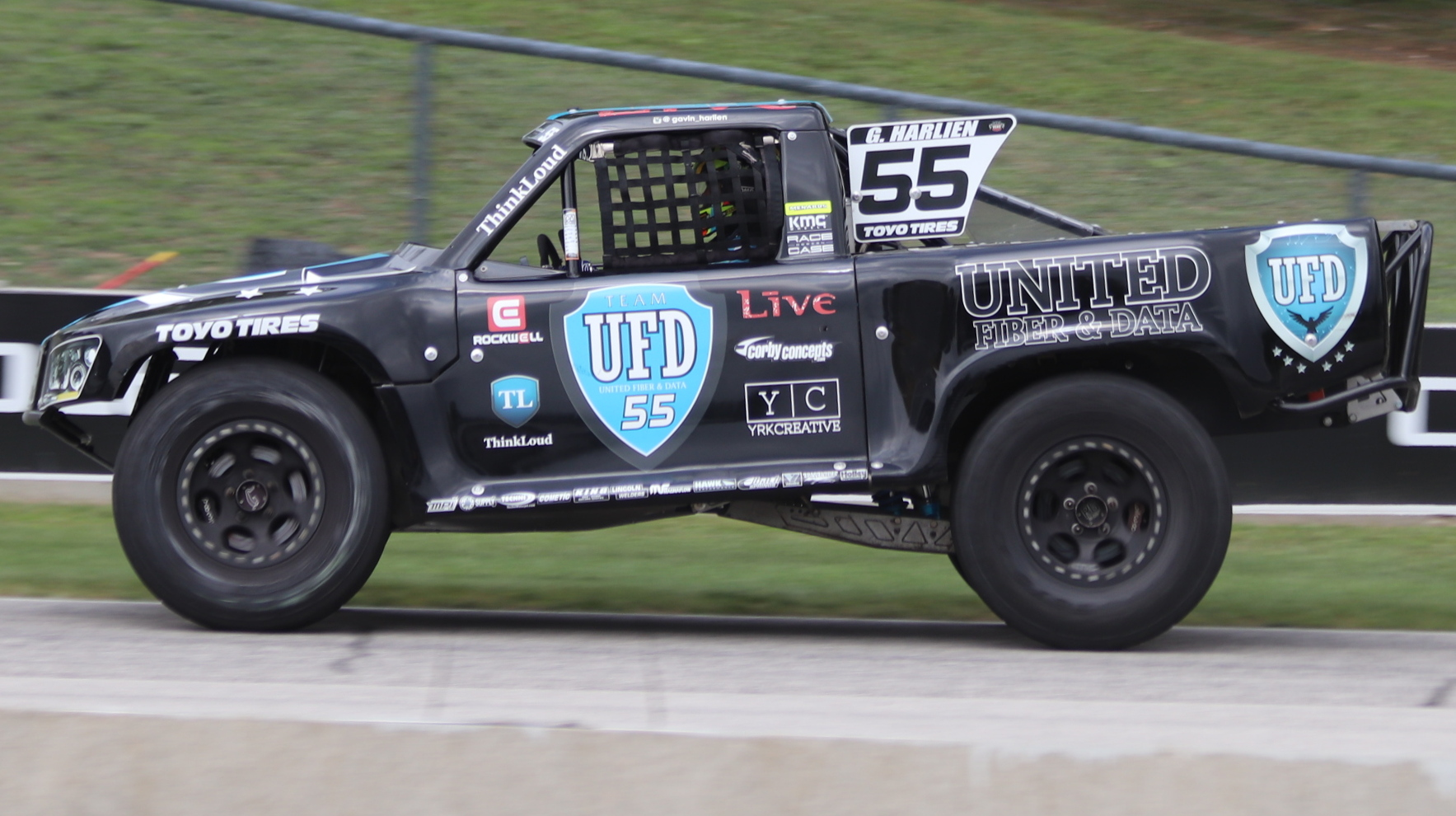
Harlien competing in the Stadium Super Trucks at Road America in 2018

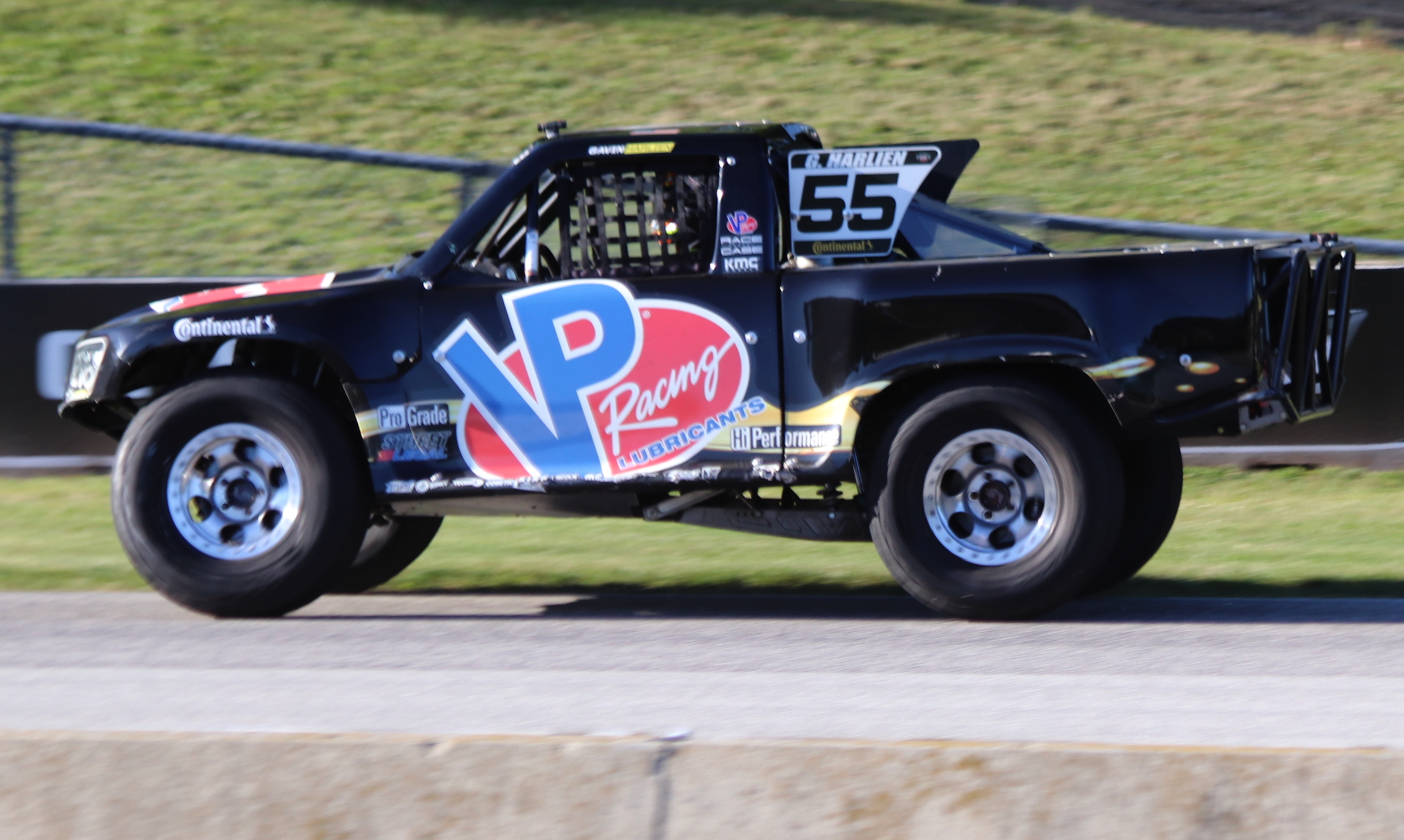
Harlien's Stadium Super Truck in 2019

On March 30, 2014, Harlien made his first start in the Stadium Super Trucks with a fourth-place run at St. Petersburg. In June, he competed in the series' X Games Austin 2014 round; at 14 years, he was the youngest motorized athlete in X Games history. He finished fifth in his heat race and ninth in the final. The following year, he returned to SST at X Games Austin 2015, but failed to qualify for the final after finishing fifth in his heat and failing to start the Last Chance Qualifier. 2015 also saw his debut in the Global RallyCross Championship Lites division with Tim Bell Racing.

Harlien began competing full-time in the Stadium Super Trucks in 2017. Although he failed to win a race, he finished fourth in the standings with nine podiums. In 2018, he scored his first SST win in the Grand Prix of Long Beach after taking the lead before the race was called for Apdaly Lopez's wreck. He recorded four more wins at Detroit, Texas Motor Speedway, Sydney Motorsport Park, and Glen Helen Raceway as he finished second in the championship to Matthew Brabham by 50 points.

In June 2019, Harlien made his stock car racing debut in the ARCA Menards Series at World Wide Technology Raceway at Gateway, driving the No. 55 Toyota Camry for Venturini Motorsports in the first of a three-race deal. He finished eighth in the race. Harlien ran two more ARCA races in 2019 at Iowa Speedway and Salem Speedway.

After not racing in 2020 and 2021 to focus on his schooling, Harlien rejoined SST for the 2022 season opener at Long Beach. At Mid-Ohio Sports Car Course, he was the fastest qualifier and won his first race since his return, albeit in controversial fashion due to a scoring error by USAC; a runner-up finish in the next day's race allowed him to claim the weekend victory. Harlien scored another win at Bristol Motor Speedway and claimed the championship by 25 points on runner-up Max Gordon. Despite going winless in 2023, he won a second straight title by four points over Brabham.

== Personal life ==
Born in Austin, Harlien is a graduate of Brophy College Preparatory. He was a business major at the University of Arizona.

== Motorsports career results ==
=== Stadium Super Trucks ===
(key) (Bold – Pole position. Italics – Fastest qualifier. * – Most laps led.)

Stadium Super Trucks results
Year	1	2	3	4	5	6	7	8	9	10	11	12	13	14	15	16	17	18	19	20	21	22	SSTC	Pts	Ref
2014	STP; 4	STP; 7	LBH; 5	IMS	IMS	DET	DET	DET	AUS; 9	TOR	TOR	OCF	OCF	CSS	LVV; 5	LVV; 5							10th	112	
2015	ADE	ADE	ADE	STP	STP	LBH	DET	DET	DET	AUS; DNQ	TOR	TOR	OCF	OCF	OCF	SRF	SRF	SRF	SRF	SYD	LVV	LVV	29th	20	
2017	ADE; 8	ADE; 7	ADE; 7	STP; 10	STP; 6	LBH; 3	LBH; 3	PER; 11	**PER**; 2*	PER; 3	DET; 2	DET; 3	TEX; 3	TEX; 2	HID; 4	HID; 2	HID; 3	BEI; 4	GLN; 4	GLN; 6	ELS; 4	ELS; 7	4th	459	
2018	ELS; 3	ADE; 6	ADE; 2	ADE; 6	LBH; 1	LBH; 3	PER; 9	PER; 6	DET; 1	DET; 3	TEX; 1	TEX; 2	ROA; 3	ROA; 5	SMP; 2*	SMP; 1	HLN; 4	HLN; 1	MXC; 4	MXC; 5			2nd	490	
2019	COA; 8	COA; 3*	TEX; 3	TEX; 4	LBH; 4	LBH; 3	TOR; 7	TOR; 1*	MOH; 8*	**MOH**; 1*	MOH; 6	MOH; 8	ROA; 5*	ROA; 1*	ROA; 1	POR; 2	POR; 5	SRF; 3	SRF; 10				3rd	402	
2022	LBH; 6	LBH; 6	MOH; 1	MOH; 2	NSH; 2*	NSH; 1	BRI; 1	BRI; 5															1st	216	
2023	LBH; 3	LBH; 3	NSH; 4	NSH; 2																			1st	100	

=== ARCA Menards Series ===
(key) (Bold – Pole position awarded by qualifying time. Italics – Pole position earned by points standings or practice time. * – Most laps led.)

ARCA Menards Series results
Year	Team	No.	Make	1	2	3	4	5	6	7	8	9	10	11	12	13	14	15	16	17	18	19	20	AMSC	Pts	Ref
2019	Venturini Motorsports	55	Toyota	DAY	FIF	SLM	TAL	NSH	TOL	CLT	POC	MCH	MAD	GTW; 8	CHI	ELK	IOW; 12	POC	ISF	DSF	SLM; 16	IRP	KAN	32nd	510	

^{*} Season still in progress
^{1} Ineligible for series points

Sporting positions
Preceded by Matthew Brabham	Stadium Super Trucks; Champion; 2022–2023	Succeeded by Robby Gordon
