= 2025 Ecosave 250 =

22nd race of the 2025 NASCAR Craftsman Truck Series

Race details
- Race 22 of 25 of the 2025 NASCAR Craftsman Truck Series
- Date: October 3, 2025
- Official name: 1st Annual Ecosave 250
- Location: Charlotte Motor Speedway in Concord, North Carolina
- Course: Permanent racing facility
- Course length: 2.320 miles (3.734 km)
- Distance: 70 laps, 159.6 mi (256.85 km)
- Scheduled distance: 67 laps, 152.76 mi (245.84 km)
- Average speed: 75.244 mph (121.093 km/h)

Pole position
Driver	Corey Heim	Tricon Garage
- Time: 1:25.064

Most laps led
Driver	Brent Crews	Tricon Garage
- Laps: 56

Winner
No. 11	Corey Heim	Tricon Garage

Television in the United States
- Network: FS1
- Announcers: Jamie Little, Kevin Harvick, and Joey Logano

Radio in the United States
- Radio: NRN

The 2025 Ecosave 250 was the 22nd stock car race of the 2025 NASCAR Craftsman Truck Series, the first race of the Round of 8, and the 1st iteration of the event. The race was held on Friday, October 3, 2025, at the Charlotte Motor Speedway roval layout in Concord, North Carolina, a 2.320 miles (3.734 km) permanent road course. The race was contested over 70 laps, extended from 67 laps due to a green–white–checkered finish.

Corey Heim, driving for Tricon Garage, would rebound from a first lap incident, and held off the field on an overtime restart with older tires to earn his 21st career NASCAR Craftsman Truck Series win, and a season-record 10th of the season. He would also advance into the Championship 4. To fill out the podium, Brent Crews and Gio Ruggiero, both driving for Tricon Garage, would finish 2nd and 3rd to make it a Tricon 1-2-3 finish, respectively.

Crews would end up dominating the event, leading a race-high 56 laps before the caution came out with two laps to go. Crews lost positions on pit road and rebounded to finish second after a wreck in turn seven.

== Report ==
=== Background ===
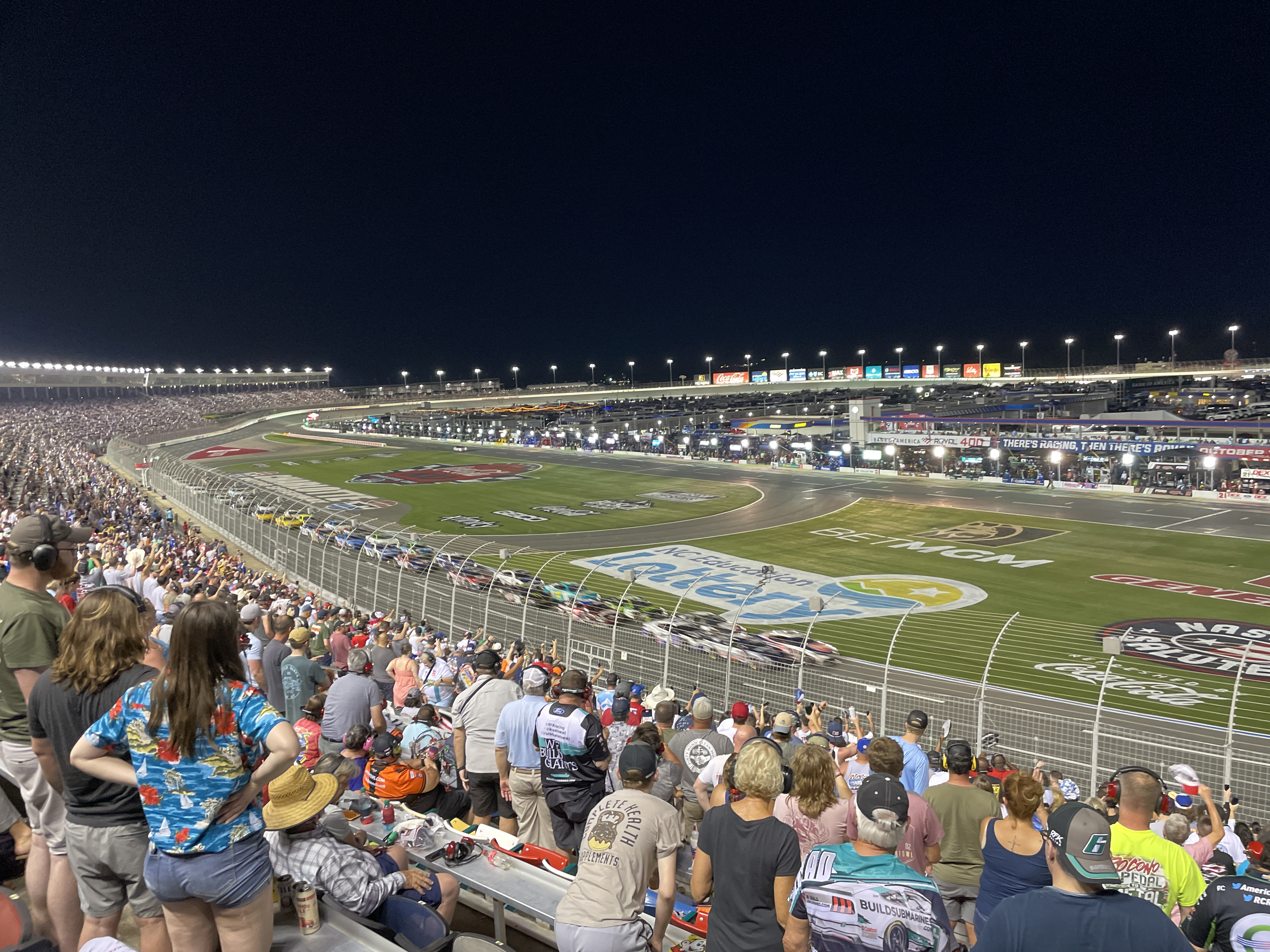
Charlotte Motor Speedway, the track where the race will be held.

Since 2018, deviating from past NASCAR events at Charlotte, the race will utilize a road course configuration of Charlotte Motor Speedway, promoted and trademarked as the "Roval". The course is 2.28 miles (3.67 km) in length and features 17 turns, utilizing the infield road course and portions of the oval track. The race will be contested over a scheduled distance of 109 laps, 400 kilometres (250 mi).

During July 2018 tests on the road course, concerns were raised over drivers "cheating" the backstretch chicane on the course. The chicanes were modified with additional tire barriers and rumble strips in order to encourage drivers to properly drive through them, and NASCAR will enforce drive-through penalties on drivers who illegally "short-cut" parts of the course. The chicanes will not be used during restarts. In the summer of 2019, the bus stop on the backstretch was changed and deepened, becoming a permanent part of the circuit, compared to the previous year where it was improvised.

If a driver fails to legally make the backstretch bus stop, the driver must skip the frontstretch chicane and make a complete stop by the dotted line on the exit before being allowed to continue. A driver who misses the frontstretch chicane must stop before the exit.

On May 26, 2024, it was announced that the Charlotte Roval would get a redesign, featuring an updated infield road course which includes an extension of the straightaway after turn 5, a new turn 6, and a sharper hairpin for turn 7, in addition the apex for turn 16 on the final chicane was made tighter.

=== Entry list ===
- (R) denotes rookie driver.
- (i) denotes driver who is ineligible for series driver points.
- (P) denotes playoff driver.
- (OP) denotes owner's playoff truck.

#	Driver	Team	Make
1	Brent Crews	Tricon Garage	Toyota
02	Ben Maier	Young's Motorsports	Chevrolet
2	Carter Fartuch	Reaume Brothers Racing	Ford
5	Toni Breidinger (R)	Tricon Garage	Toyota
7	Connor Zilisch (i)	Spire Motorsports	Chevrolet
9	Grant Enfinger (P)	CR7 Motorsports	Chevrolet
11	Corey Heim (P)	Tricon Garage	Toyota
13	Jake Garcia	ThorSport Racing	Ford
15	Tanner Gray	Tricon Garage	Toyota
16	Kris Wright (i)	McAnally-Hilgemann Racing	Chevrolet
17	Gio Ruggiero (R)	Tricon Garage	Toyota
18	Tyler Ankrum (P)	McAnally-Hilgemann Racing	Chevrolet
19	Daniel Hemric (P)	McAnally-Hilgemann Racing	Chevrolet
20	Will Rodgers (i)	Young's Motorsports	Chevrolet
22	Josh Reaume	Reaume Brothers Racing	Ford
26	Dawson Sutton (R)	Rackley W.A.R.	Chevrolet
33	Mason Maggio (i)	Reaume Brothers Racing	Ford
34	Layne Riggs (P)	Front Row Motorsports	Ford
38	Chandler Smith	Front Row Motorsports	Ford
41	Josh Bilicki (i)	Niece Motorsports	Chevrolet
42	Matt Mills	Niece Motorsports	Chevrolet
44	Andrés Pérez de Lara (R)	Niece Motorsports	Chevrolet
45	Bayley Currey	Niece Motorsports	Chevrolet
52	Kaden Honeycutt (P)	Halmar Friesen Racing	Toyota
56	Timmy Hill	Hill Motorsports	Toyota
62	Wesley Slimp	Halmar Friesen Racing	Toyota
69	Tyler Tomassi (i)	MBM Motorsports	Ford
71	Rajah Caruth (P)	Spire Motorsports	Chevrolet
75	Parker Kligerman	Henderson Motorsports	Chevrolet
76	Spencer Boyd	Freedom Racing Enterprises	Chevrolet
77	Corey LaJoie	Spire Motorsports	Chevrolet
81	Connor Mosack (R)	McAnally-Hilgemann Racing	Chevrolet
88	Matt Crafton	ThorSport Racing	Ford
91	Jack Wood	McAnally-Hilgemann Racing	Chevrolet
98	Ty Majeski (P)	ThorSport Racing	Ford
99	Ben Rhodes	ThorSport Racing	Ford
Official entry list

== Practice ==
The first and only practice session was held on Friday, October 3, at 11:05 AM EST, and would last for 50 minutes. Corey Heim, driving for Tricon Garage, would set the fastest time in the session, with a lap of 1:26.341, and a speed of 95.065 mph (152.992 km/h).

Pos.	#	Driver	Team	Make	Time	Speed
1	11	Corey Heim (P)	Tricon Garage	Toyota	1:26.341	95.065
2	1	Brent Crews	Tricon Garage	Toyota	1:26.503	94.887
3	7	Connor Zilisch (i)	Spire Motorsports	Chevrolet	1:26.655	94.720
Full practice results

== Qualifying ==
Qualifying was held on Friday, October 3, at 12:10 PM EST. Since the Charlotte Motor Speedway roval layout is a road course, the qualifying procedure used is a two-group system, with one round. Drivers were separated into two groups, A and B. Each driver would have multiple laps to set a time. Whoever sets the fastest time between both groups will win the pole.

Under a 2021 rule change, the timing line in road course qualifying is "not" the start-finish line. Instead, the timing line for qualifying will be set at the exit of Turn 13. Corey Heim, driving for Tricon Garage, would set the fastest time between both groups, with a lap of 1:25.064, and a speed of 96.492 mph (155.289 km/h).

No drivers would fail to qualify.

=== Qualifying results ===
Pos.	#	Driver	Team	Make	Time	Speed
1	11	Corey Heim (P)	Tricon Garage	Toyota	1:25.064	96.492
2	34	Layne Riggs (P)	Front Row Motorsports	Ford	1:25.268	96.261
3	1	Brent Crews	Tricon Garage	Toyota	1:25.297	96.228
4	9	Grant Enfinger (P)	CR7 Motorsports	Chevrolet	1:25.326	96.196
5	52	Kaden Honeycutt (P)	Halmar Friesen Racing	Toyota	1:25.491	96.010
6	7	Connor Zilisch (i)	Spire Motorsports	Chevrolet	1:25.720	95.754
7	17	Gio Ruggiero (R)	Tricon Garage	Toyota	1:25.777	95.690
8	77	Corey LaJoie	Spire Motorsports	Chevrolet	1:25.816	95.646
9	98	Ty Majeski (P)	ThorSport Racing	Ford	1:25.891	95.563
10	41	Josh Bilicki (i)	Niece Motorsports	Chevrolet	1:25.956	95.491
11	18	Tyler Ankrum (P)	McAnally-Hilgemann Racing	Chevrolet	1:26.204	95.216
12	45	Bayley Currey	Niece Motorsports	Chevrolet	1:26.432	94.965
13	44	Andrés Pérez de Lara (R)	Niece Motorsports	Chevrolet	1:26.442	94.954
14	15	Tanner Gray	Tricon Garage	Toyota	1:26.457	94.937
15	81	Connor Mosack (R)	McAnally-Hilgemann Racing	Chevrolet	1:26.463	94.931
16	75	Parker Kligerman	Henderson Motorsports	Chevrolet	1:26.567	94.817
17	42	Matt Mills	Niece Motorsports	Chevrolet	1:26.570	94.813
18	71	Rajah Caruth (P)	Spire Motorsports	Chevrolet	1:26.810	94.551
19	26	Dawson Sutton (R)	Rackley W.A.R.	Chevrolet	1:26.999	94.346
20	38	Chandler Smith	Front Row Motorsports	Ford	1:27.304	94.016
21	02	Ben Maier	Young's Motorsports	Chevrolet	1:27.390	93.924
22	99	Ben Rhodes	ThorSport Racing	Ford	1:27.402	93.911
23	13	Jake Garcia	ThorSport Racing	Ford	1:27.534	93.769
24	88	Matt Crafton	ThorSport Racing	Ford	1:27.559	93.743
25	16	Kris Wright (i)	McAnally-Hilgemann Racing	Chevrolet	1:27.640	93.656
26	56	Timmy Hill	Hill Motorsports	Toyota	1:27.764	93.524
27	91	Jack Wood	McAnally-Hilgemann Racing	Chevrolet	1:27.854	93.428
28	62	Wesley Slimp	Halmar Friesen Racing	Toyota	1:27.985	93.289
29	33	Mason Maggio (i)	Reaume Brothers Racing	Ford	1:29.009	92.215
30	5	Toni Breidinger (R)	Tricon Garage	Toyota	1:29.127	92.093
31	20	Will Rodgers (i)	Young's Motorsports	Chevrolet	1:29.294	91.921
Qualified by owner's points
32	76	Spencer Boyd	Freedom Racing Enterprises	Chevrolet	1:29.883	91.319
33	69	Tyler Tomassi (i)	MBM Motorsports	Ford	1:30.466	90.730
34	19	Daniel Hemric (P)	McAnally-Hilgemann Racing	Chevrolet	–	–
35	22	Josh Reaume	Reaume Brothers Racing	Ford	–	–
36	2	Carter Fartuch	Reaume Brothers Racing	Ford	–	–
Official qualifying results
Official starting lineup

== Race results ==
Stage 1 Laps: 20

Pos.	#	Driver	Team	Make	Pts
1	52	Kaden Honeycutt (P)	Halmar Friesen Racing	Toyota	10
2	98	Ty Majeski (P)	ThorSport Racing	Ford	9
3	18	Tyler Ankrum (P)	McAnally-Hilgemann Racing	Chevrolet	8
4	19	Daniel Hemric (P)	McAnally-Hilgemann Racing	Chevrolet	7
5	1	Brent Crews	Tricon Garage	Toyota	6
6	7	Connor Zilisch (i)	Spire Motorsports	Chevrolet	0
7	71	Rajah Caruth (P)	Spire Motorsports	Chevrolet	4
8	17	Gio Ruggiero (R)	Tricon Garage	Toyota	3
9	77	Corey LaJoie	Spire Motorsports	Chevrolet	2
10	34	Layne Riggs (P)	Front Row Motorsports	Ford	1

Stage 2 Laps: 20

Pos.	#	Driver	Team	Make	Pts
1	52	Kaden Honeycutt (P)	Halmar Friesen Racing	Toyota	10
2	9	Grant Enfinger (P)	CR7 Motorsports	Chevrolet	9
3	71	Rajah Caruth (P)	Spire Motorsports	Chevrolet	8
4	19	Daniel Hemric (P)	McAnally-Hilgemann Racing	Chevrolet	7
5	1	Brent Crews	Tricon Garage	Toyota	6
6	18	Tyler Ankrum (P)	McAnally-Hilgemann Racing	Chevrolet	5
7	7	Connor Zilisch (i)	Spire Motorsports	Chevrolet	0
8	11	Corey Heim (P)	Tricon Garage	Toyota	3
9	42	Matt Mills	Niece Motorsports	Chevrolet	2
10	41	Josh Bilicki (i)	Niece Motorsports	Chevrolet	0

Stage 3 Laps: 30

Fin	St	#	Driver	Team	Make	Laps	Led	Status	Pts
1	1	11	Corey Heim (P)	Tricon Garage	Toyota	70	6	Running	43
2	3	1	Brent Crews	Tricon Garage	Toyota	70	56	Running	48
3	7	17	Gio Ruggiero (R)	Tricon Garage	Toyota	70	0	Running	37
4	18	71	Rajah Caruth (P)	Spire Motorsports	Chevrolet	70	0	Running	45
5	6	7	Connor Zilisch (i)	Spire Motorsports	Chevrolet	70	0	Running	0
6	10	41	Josh Bilicki (i)	Niece Motorsports	Chevrolet	70	0	Running	0
7	4	9	Grant Enfinger (P)	CR7 Motorsports	Chevrolet	70	0	Running	39
8	9	98	Ty Majeski (P)	ThorSport Racing	Ford	70	1	Running	38
9	11	18	Tyler Ankrum (P)	McAnally-Hilgemann Racing	Chevrolet	70	0	Running	41
10	15	81	Connor Mosack (R)	McAnally-Hilgemann Racing	Chevrolet	70	0	Running	27
11	34	19	Daniel Hemric (P)	McAnally-Hilgemann Racing	Chevrolet	70	0	Running	40
12	12	45	Bayley Currey	Niece Motorsports	Chevrolet	70	0	Running	25
13	19	26	Dawson Sutton (R)	Rackley W.A.R.	Chevrolet	70	0	Running	24
14	5	52	Kaden Honeycutt (P)	Halmar Friesen Racing	Toyota	70	7	Running	43
15	31	20	Will Rodgers (i)	Young's Motorsports	Chevrolet	70	0	Running	0
16	26	56	Timmy Hill	Hill Motorsports	Toyota	70	0	Running	21
17	17	42	Matt Mills	Niece Motorsports	Chevrolet	70	0	Running	22
18	8	77	Corey LaJoie	Spire Motorsports	Chevrolet	70	0	Running	21
19	20	38	Chandler Smith	Front Row Motorsports	Ford	70	0	Running	18
20	32	76	Spencer Boyd	Freedom Racing Enterprises	Chevrolet	70	0	Running	17
21	2	34	Layne Riggs (P)	Front Row Motorsports	Ford	70	0	Running	17
22	27	91	Jack Wood	McAnally-Hilgemann Racing	Chevrolet	70	0	Running	15
23	23	13	Jake Garcia	ThorSport Racing	Ford	70	0	Running	14
24	24	88	Matt Crafton	ThorSport Racing	Ford	69	0	Running	13
25	21	02	Ben Maier	Young's Motorsports	Chevrolet	69	0	Running	12
26	25	16	Kris Wright (i)	McAnally-Hilgemann Racing	Chevrolet	69	0	Running	0
27	28	62	Wesley Slimp	Halmar Friesen Racing	Toyota	69	0	Running	10
28	29	33	Mason Maggio (i)	Reaume Brothers Racing	Ford	69	0	Running	0
29	33	69	Tyler Tomassi (i)	MBM Motorsports	Ford	69	0	Running	0
30	30	5	Toni Breidinger (R)	Tricon Garage	Toyota	63	0	Electrical	7
31	14	15	Tanner Gray	Tricon Garage	Toyota	55	0	Transmission	6
32	13	44	Andrés Pérez de Lara (R)	Niece Motorsports	Chevrolet	54	0	Running	5
33	35	22	Josh Reaume	Reaume Brothers Racing	Ford	52	0	DVP	4
34	36	2	Carter Fartuch	Reaume Brothers Racing	Ford	24	0	Engine	3
35	16	75	Parker Kligerman	Henderson Motorsports	Chevrolet	20	0	Suspension	2
36	22	99	Ben Rhodes	ThorSport Racing	Ford	2	0	Accident	1
Official race results

== Standings after the race ==
Drivers' Championship standings

	Pos	Driver	Points
	1	Corey Heim	3,122
3	2	Tyler Ankrum	3,051 (–71)
	3	Daniel Hemric	3,051 (–71)
3	4	Rajah Caruth	3,050 (–72)
3	5	Layne Riggs	3,049 (–73)
2	6	Ty Majeski	3,048 (–74)
1	7	Grant Enfinger	3,046 (–76)
	8	Kaden Honeycutt	3,046 (–76)
	9	Chandler Smith	2,104 (–1,018)
	10	Jake Garcia	2,085 (–1,037)
Official driver's standings

Manufacturers' Championship standings

Pos	Manufacturer	Points
1	Toyota	805
2	Chevrolet	780 (–25)
3	Ford	762 (–43)

- Note: Only the first 10 positions are included for the driver standings.

Previous race: 2025 Team EJP 175	NASCAR Craftsman Truck Series; 2025 season	Next race: 2025 Love's RV Stop 225
