= 2025 LiUNA! 150 =

15th race of the 2025 Truck Series

Race details
- Race 15 of 25 of the 2025 NASCAR Craftsman Truck Series
- Date: June 28, 2025
- Location: Lime Rock Park in Lakeville, Connecticut
- Course: Permanent racing facility
- Course length: 1.530 miles (2.426 km)
- Scheduled distance: 100 laps, 147 mi (237 km)

Pole position
Driver	Corey Heim	Tricon Garage
- Time: 53.115

Most laps led
Driver	Corey Heim	Tricon Garage
- Laps: 99

Winner
No. 11	Corey Heim	Tricon Garage

Television in the United States
- Network: Fox
- Announcers: Jamie Little, Trevor Bayne, and Michael Waltrip

Radio in the United States
- Radio: NRN

The 2025 LiUNA! 150 was the 15th stock car race of the 2025 NASCAR Craftsman Truck Series, and the 1st iteration of the event. The race was held on Saturday, June 28, 2025, at Lime Rock Park in Lakeville, Connecticut, a 1.530 miles (2.462 km) permanent road course. The race took the scheduled 100 laps to complete.

In another dominant performance, Corey Heim, driving for Tricon Garage, swept both stages and led all but 1 lap to earn his 16th career NASCAR Craftsman Truck Series win, and his fifth of the season. To fill out the podium, Ty Majeski, driving for ThorSport Racing, and Gio Ruggiero, driving for Tricon Garage, would finish 2nd and 3rd, respectively.

== Report ==
=== Background ===
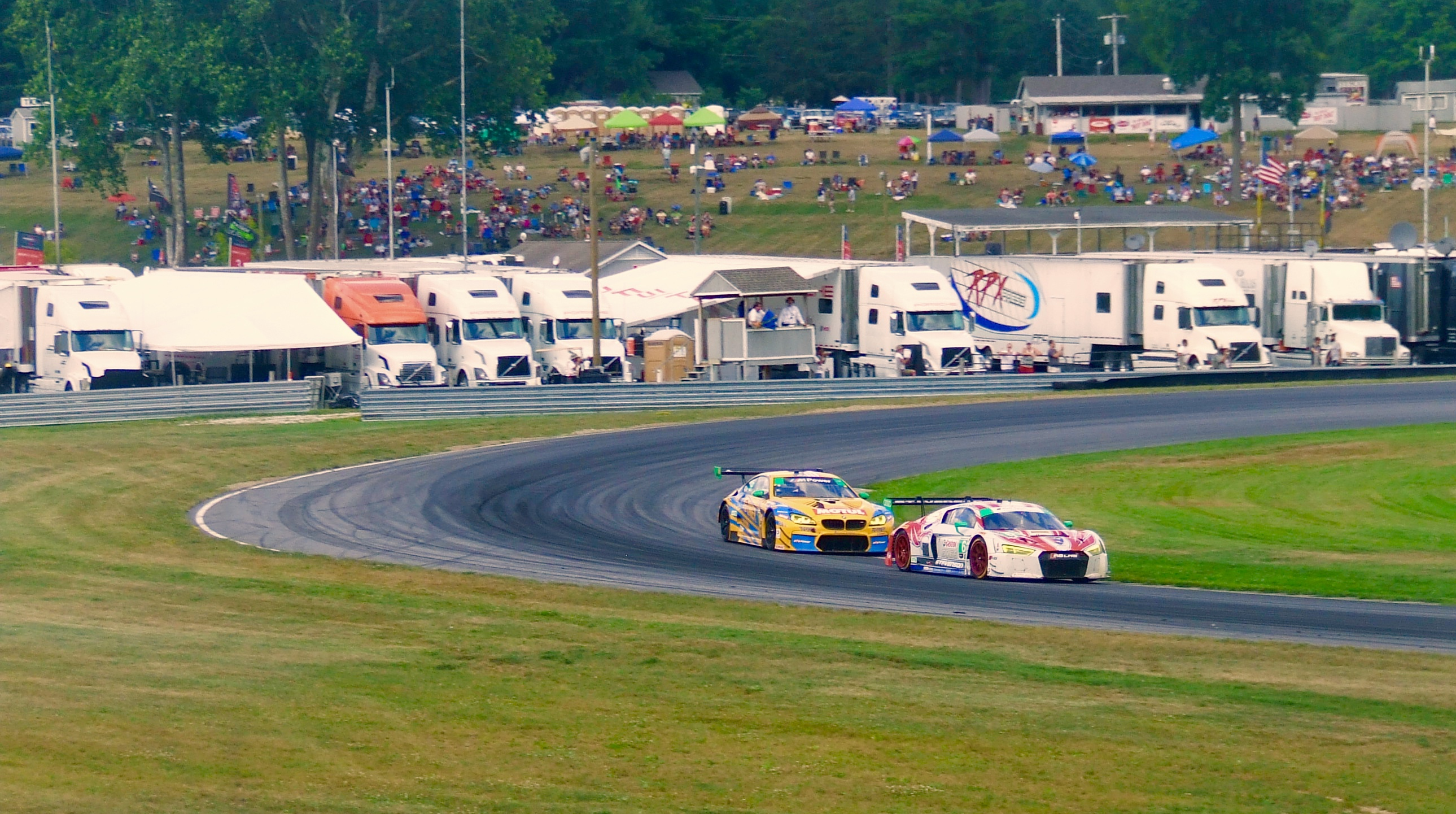
Lime Rock Park, the track where the race was held.

Lime Rock Park is a natural-terrain motorsport road racing venue located in Lakeville, Connecticut, United States, a hamlet in the town of Salisbury, in the state's northwest corner. Built in 1956, it is the nation's third oldest continuously operating road racing venue, behind Road America (1955) and Willow Springs International Motorsports Park (1953). The track was owned by Skip Barber from 1984 to April 2021, a former race car driver who started the Skip Barber Racing School in 1975. Now, it is owned by Lime Rock Group, LLC. It was listed on the National Register of Historic Places in 2009.

==== Entry list ====
- (R) denotes rookie driver.
- (i) denotes driver who is ineligible for series driver points.

#	Driver	Team	Make
1	Brent Crews	Tricon Garage	Toyota
02	Ben Maier	Young's Motorsports	Chevrolet
2	William Lambros	Reaume Brothers Racing	Ford
5	Toni Breidinger (R)	Tricon Garage	Toyota
07	Thomas Annunziata (i)	Spire Motorsports	Chevrolet
7	Jordan Taylor	Spire Motorsports	Chevrolet
9	Grant Enfinger	CR7 Motorsports	Chevrolet
11	Corey Heim	Tricon Garage	Toyota
13	Jake Garcia	ThorSport Racing	Ford
15	Tanner Gray	Tricon Garage	Toyota
17	Gio Ruggiero (R)	Tricon Garage	Toyota
18	Tyler Ankrum	McAnally-Hilgemann Racing	Chevrolet
19	Daniel Hemric	McAnally-Hilgemann Racing	Chevrolet
22	Alex Labbé	Reaume Brothers Racing	Ford
26	Dawson Sutton (R)	Rackley W.A.R.	Chevrolet
32	Dale Quarterley	NDS Motorsports	Chevrolet
33	Frankie Muniz (R)	Reaume Brothers Racing	Ford
34	Layne Riggs	Front Row Motorsports	Ford
38	Chandler Smith	Front Row Motorsports	Ford
42	Matt Mills	Niece Motorsports	Chevrolet
44	Josh Bilicki (i)	Niece Motorsports	Chevrolet
45	Kaden Honeycutt	Niece Motorsports	Chevrolet
52	Stewart Friesen	Halmar Friesen Racing	Toyota
56	Timmy Hill	Hill Motorsports	Toyota
62	Wesley Slimp	Halmar Friesen Racing	Toyota
66	Cameron Waters	ThorSport Racing	Ford
71	Rajah Caruth	Spire Motorsports	Chevrolet
76	Spencer Boyd	Freedom Racing Enterprises	Chevrolet
77	Andrés Pérez de Lara (R)	Spire Motorsports	Chevrolet
81	Connor Mosack (R)	McAnally-Hilgemann Racing	Chevrolet
88	Matt Crafton	ThorSport Racing	Ford
91	Jack Wood	McAnally-Hilgemann Racing	Chevrolet
98	Ty Majeski	ThorSport Racing	Ford
99	Ben Rhodes	ThorSport Racing	Ford
Official entry list

== Practice ==
The first and only practice session was held on Friday, June 27, at 1:05 PM EST, and would last for 50 minutes. Jordan Taylor, driving for Spire Motorsports, would set the fastest time of the session, with a lap of 54.093, and a speed of 98.364 mph (158.302 km/h).

Pos.	#	Driver	Team	Make	Time	Speed
1	7	Jordan Taylor	Spire Motorsports	Chevrolet	54.093	98.364
2	1	Brent Crews	Tricon Garage	Toyota	54.174	98.217
3	45	Kaden Honeycutt	Niece Motorsports	Chevrolet	54.179	98.208
Full practice results

== Qualifying ==
Qualifying was held on Saturday, June 28, at 9:30 AM EST. Since Lime Rock Park is a road course, the qualifying procedure used is a two group, one round system. Drivers will be separated into two groups, A and B. Both sessions will be 20 minutes long, and each driver will have multiple laps to set a time. Whoever sets the fastest time between both sessions will win the pole.

Corey Heim, driving for Tricon Garage, would score the pole for the race, with a lap of 53.115, and a speed of 100.175 mph (161.216 km/h).

=== Qualifying results ===
Pos.	#	Driver	Team	Make	Time	Speed
1	11	Corey Heim	Tricon Garage	Toyota	53.115	100.175
2	7	Jordan Taylor	Spire Motorsports	Chevrolet	53.281	99.863
3	34	Layne Riggs	Front Row Motorsports	Ford	53.319	99.792
4	98	Ty Majeski	ThorSport Racing	Ford	53.434	99.577
5	1	Brent Crews	Tricon Garage	Toyota	53.499	99.456
6	45	Kaden Honeycutt	Niece Motorsports	Chevrolet	53.702	99.080
7	71	Rajah Caruth	Spire Motorsports	Chevrolet	53.727	99.034
8	81	Connor Mosack (R)	McAnally-Hilgemann Racing	Chevrolet	53.747	98.997
9	38	Chandler Smith	Front Row Motorsports	Ford	53.755	98.982
10	77	Andrés Pérez de Lara (R)	Spire Motorsports	Chevrolet	53.769	98.957
11	19	Daniel Hemric	McAnally-Hilgemann Racing	Chevrolet	53.841	98.824
12	17	Gio Ruggiero (R)	Tricon Garage	Toyota	53.873	98.766
13	07	Thomas Annunziata (i)	Spire Motorsports	Chevrolet	53.893	98.729
14	9	Grant Enfinger	CR7 Motorsports	Chevrolet	53.939	98.645
15	18	Tyler Ankrum	McAnally-Hilgemann Racing	Chevrolet	53.979	98.572
16	66	Cam Waters	ThorSport Racing	Ford	54.185	98.197
17	13	Jake Garcia	ThorSport Racing	Ford	54.256	98.197
18	44	Josh Bilicki (i)	Niece Motorsports	Chevrolet	54.375	97.854
19	99	Ben Rhodes	ThorSport Racing	Ford	54.456	97.708
20	02	Ben Maier	Young's Motorsports	Chevrolet	54.525	97.585
21	42	Matt Mills	Niece Motorsports	Chevrolet	54.564	97.515
22	52	Stewart Friesen	Halmar Friesen Racing	Toyota	54.597	97.456
23	88	Matt Crafton	ThorSport Racing	Ford	54.618	97.418
24	15	Tanner Gray	Tricon Garage	Toyota	54.658	97.347
25	26	Dawson Sutton (R)	Rackley W.A.R.	Chevrolet	54.809	97.079
26	22	Alex Labbé	Reaume Brothers Racing	Ford	54.914	96.893
27	56	Timmy Hill	Hill Motorsports	Toyota	55.106	96.556
28	5	Toni Breidinger (R)	Tricon Garage	Toyota	55.141	96.494
29	2	William Lambros	Reaume Brothers Racing	Ford	55.497	95.875
30	33	Frankie Muniz (R)	Reaume Brothers Racing	Ford	55.645	95.620
31	32	Dale Quarterley	NDS Motorsports	Chevrolet	55.835	95.295
Qualified by owner's points
32	76	Spencer Boyd	Freedom Racing Enterprises	Chevrolet	56.520	94.140
33	62	Wesley Slimp	Halmar Friesen Racing	Toyota	56.549	94.092
34	91	Jack Wood	McAnally-Hilgemann Racing	Chevrolet	–	–
Official qualifying results
Official starting lineup

== Race results ==
Stage 1 Laps: 35

Pos.	#	Driver	Team	Make	Pts
1	11	Corey Heim	Tricon Garage	Toyota	10
2	34	Layne Riggs	Front Row Motorsports	Ford	9
3	7	Jordan Taylor	Spire Motorsports	Chevrolet	8
4	1	Brent Crews	Tricon Garage	Toyota	7
5	81	Connor Mosack (R)	McAnally-Hilgemann Racing	Chevrolet	6
6	45	Kaden Honeycutt	Niece Motorsports	Chevrolet	5
7	38	Chandler Smith	Front Row Motorsports	Ford	4
8	71	Rajah Caruth	Spire Motorsports	Chevrolet	3
9	98	Ty Majeski	ThorSport Racing	Ford	2
10	07	Thomas Annunziata (i)	Spire Motorsports	Chevrolet	0

Stage 2 Laps: 35

Pos.	#	Driver	Team	Make	Pts
1	11	Corey Heim	Tricon Garage	Toyota	10
2	34	Layne Riggs	Front Row Motorsports	Ford	9
3	7	Jordan Taylor	Spire Motorsports	Chevrolet	8
4	81	Connor Mosack (R)	McAnally-Hilgemann Racing	Chevrolet	7
5	38	Chandler Smith	Front Row Motorsports	Ford	6
6	45	Kaden Honeycutt	Niece Motorsports	Chevrolet	5
7	98	Ty Majeski	ThorSport Racing	Ford	4
8	07	Thomas Annunziata (i)	Spire Motorsports	Chevrolet	0
9	71	Rajah Caruth	Spire Motorsports	Chevrolet	2
10	9	Grant Enfinger	CR7 Motorsports	Chevrolet	1

Stage 3 Laps: 30

Pos.	St.	#	Driver	Team	Make	Laps	Led	Status	Pts
1	1	11	Corey Heim	Tricon Garage	Toyota	100	99	Running	61
2	4	98	Ty Majeski	ThorSport Racing	Ford	100	0	Running	41
3	12	17	Gio Ruggiero	Tricon Garage	Toyota	100	0	Running	34
4	19	99	Ben Rhodes	ThorSport Racing	Ford	100	0	Running	33
5	16	66	Cam Waters	ThorSport Racing	Ford	100	0	Running	32
6	9	38	Chandler Smith	Front Row Motorsports	Ford	100	0	Running	41
7	18	44	Josh Bilicki (i)	Niece Motorsports	Chevrolet	100	0	Running	0
8	5	1	Brent Crews	Tricon Garage	Toyota	100	0	Running	36
9	11	19	Daniel Hemric	McAnally-Hilgemann Racing	Chevrolet	100	0	Running	28
10	15	18	Tyler Ankrum	McAnally-Hilgemann Racing	Chevrolet	100	0	Running	27
11	14	9	Grant Enfinger	CR7 Motorsports	Chevrolet	100	0	Running	27
12	6	45	Kaden Honeycutt	Niece Motorsports	Chevrolet	100	0	Running	35
13	3	34	Layne Riggs	Front Row Motorsports	Ford	100	1	Running	42
14	24	15	Tanner Gray	Tricon Garage	Toyota	100	0	Running	23
15	13	07	Thomas Annunziata (i)	Spire Motorsports	Chevrolet	100	0	Running	0
16	8	81	Connor Mosack (R)	McAnally-Hilgemann Racing	Chevrolet	100	0	Running	34
17	10	77	Andrés Pérez de Lara (R)	Spire Motorsports	Chevrolet	100	0	Running	20
18	20	02	Ben Maier	Young's Motorsports	Chevrolet	100	0	Running	19
19	23	88	Matt Crafton	ThorSport Racing	Ford	100	0	Running	18
20	2	7	Jordan Taylor	Spire Motorsports	Chevrolet	100	0	Running	33
21	7	71	Rajah Caruth	Spire Motorsports	Chevrolet	100	0	Running	18
22	34	91	Jack Wood	McAnally-Hilgemann Racing	Chevrolet	100	0	Running	14
23	22	52	Stewart Friesen	Halmar Friesen Racing	Toyota	100	0	Running	16
24	17	13	Jake Garcia	ThorSport Racing	Ford	100	0	Running	15
25	27	56	Timmy Hill	Hill Motorsports	Toyota	98	0	Running	12
26	21	42	Matt Mills	Niece Motorsports	Chevrolet	98	0	Running	11
27	29	2	William Lambros	Reaume Brothers Racing	Ford	98	0	Running	10
28	30	33	Frankie Muniz (R)	Reaume Brothers Racing	Ford	98	0	Running	9
29	28	5	Toni Breidinger (R)	Tricon Garage	Toyota	98	0	Running	8
30	25	26	Dawson Sutton (R)	Rackley W.A.R.	Chevrolet	96	0	Running	7
31	32	76	Spencer Boyd	Freedom Racing Enterprises	Chevrolet	92	0	Running	5
32	31	32	Dale Quarterley	NDS Motorsports	Chevrolet	91	0	Electrical	6
33	33	62	Wesley Slimp	Halmar Friesen Racing	Toyota	90	0	Ignition	4
34	26	22	Alex Labbé	Reaume Brothers Racing	Ford	34	0	Rear Gear	0
Official race results

== Standings after the race ==
Drivers' Championship standings

	Pos	Driver	Points
	1	Corey Heim	690
	2	Chandler Smith	546 (–144)
1	3	Layne Riggs	525 (–165)
1	4	Daniel Hemric	514 (–176)
1	5	Kaden Honeycutt	491 (–199)
1	6	Grant Enfinger	488 (–202)
	7	Tyler Ankrum	468 (–222)
	8	Ty Majeski	462 (–228)
	9	Jake Garcia	424 (–266)
1	10	Gio Ruggiero	397 (–293)
Official driver's standings

Manufacturers' Championship standings

Pos	Manufacturer	Points
1	Chevrolet	546
2	Toyota	537 (–9)
3	Ford	520 (–26)

- Note: Only the first 10 positions are included for the driver standings.

Previous race: 2025 MillerTech Battery 200	NASCAR Craftsman Truck Series; 2025 season	Next race: 2025 TSport 200
