= 2023 Stadium Super Trucks =

Short course off-road racing series

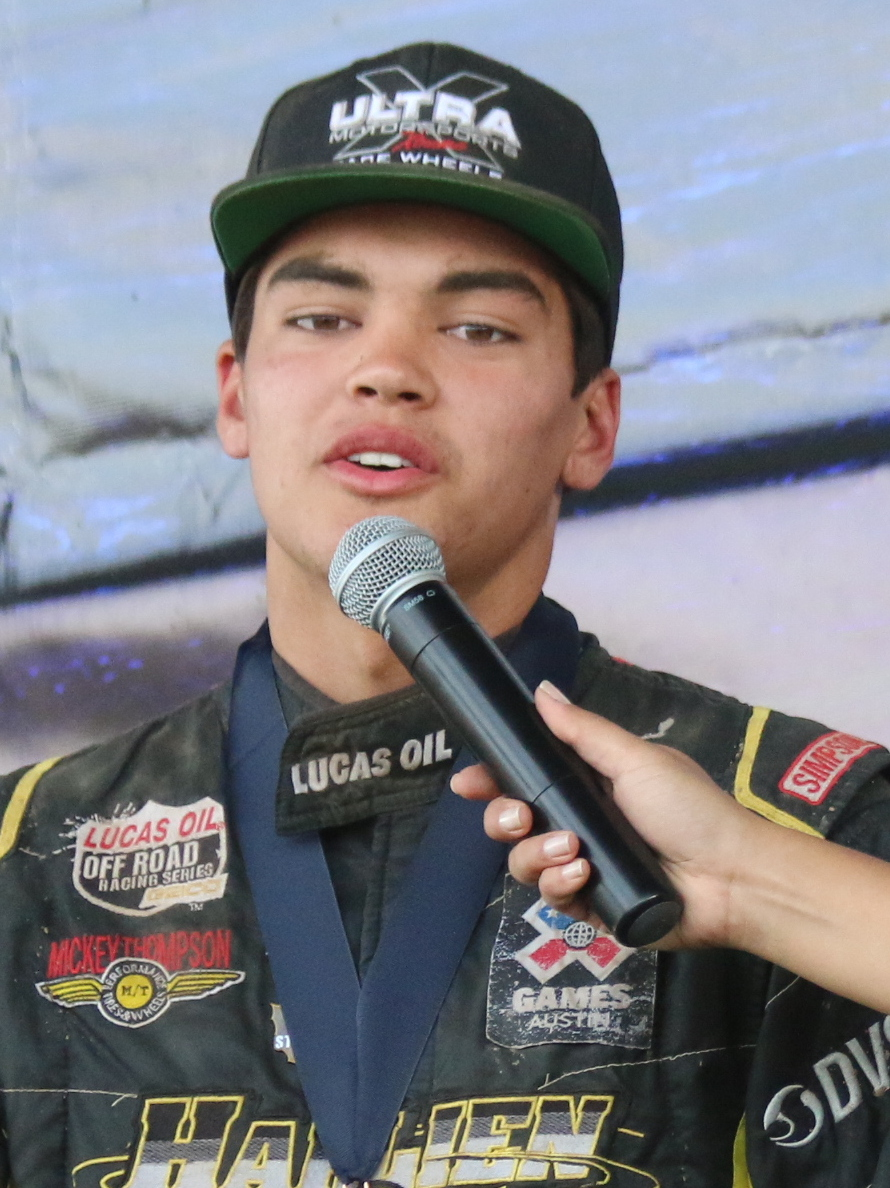
Gavin Harlien, the 2023 champion

The 2023 Stadium Super Trucks were the eleventh season of the Stadium Super Trucks. The season began with the Long Beach Street Circuit and concluded at the Music City Grand Prix.

Gavin Harlien won back to back championships, despite not scoring a single victory across the whole season.

== Drivers ==
No.	Driver	Races
1	(United States) Gavin Harlien	1–4
5	(United States) Bruce Binnquist	1–2
7	(United States) Robby Gordon	1–4
21	(United States) Zoey Edenholm	3–4
23	(United States) David Bernstein	1–4
28	(United States) Robert Stout	1–4
50	(United States) Trey Hernquist	1–4
51	(United States) Ryan Beat	1–4
57	(United States) Bill Hynes	1–4
67	(United States) Ben Maier	3–4
68	(United States) Blade Hildebrand	3–4
69	(United States) Joshua Thomas	1–2
77	(United States) Max Gordon	1–4
83	(Australia) Matthew Brabham	1–4
84	(United States) Rob Radmann	3–4
957	(United States) Myles Cheek	1–4
Sources: (Note: Entry lists: Long Beach (Races 1–2); Nashville (Races 3–4))

== Schedule ==
Long Beach, which has hosted SST since the inaugural season in 2013, returned to the schedule for 2023.

Round	Track	Location	Date	Supporting
1	Long Beach Street Circuit	Long Beach, California	April 14–16	Grand Prix of Long Beach
2	Nashville Street Circuit	Nashville, Tennessee	August 4–6	Music City Grand Prix

== Results and standings ==
=== Race results ===
Round	Race	Event	Fastest qualifier	Pole position	Most laps led	Winning driver	Ref
1	1	Long Beach	(United States) Robby Gordon	(United States) Bill Hynes	(Australia) Matthew Brabham	(Australia) Matthew Brabham	
1	2	Long Beach	(United States) Robby Gordon	(United States) Bill Hynes	(United States) Myles Cheek	(Australia) Matthew Brabham	
2	3	Nashville	(Australia) Matthew Brabham	(United States) Bill Hynes	(United States) Myles Cheek	(United States) Robert Stout	
2	4	Nashville	(Australia) Matthew Brabham	(United States) Robby Gordon	(United States) Robby Gordon	(United States) Robby Gordon	

=== Drivers' championship ===
Rank	Driver	(California) LBH		(Tennessee) NSH		Points
1	(United States) Gavin Harlien	3	3	4	2	100
2	(Australia) Matthew Brabham	1*	1	13	3	96
3	(United States) Myles Cheek	7	2*	2*	5	93
4	(United States) Robby Gordon	2	4	14	**1***	90
5	(United States) Max Gordon	4	5	3	4	87
6	(United States) Robert Stout	5	6	1	9	80
7	(United States) Trey Hernquist	8	7	7	7	59
8	(United States) Ryan Beat	6	11	5	14	48
9	(United States) Bill Hynes	**10**	**12**	**8**	8	46
10	(United States) David Bernstein	12	9	12	11	44
11	(United States) Ben Maier			6	12	29
12	(United States) Blade Hildebrand			9	6	27
13	(United States) Bruce Binnquist	9	8			25
14	(Australia) Joshua Thomas	11	10			23
15	(United States) Rob Radmann			11	10	23
16	(United States) Zoey Edenholm			10	13	21
Rank	Driver	(California) LBH		(Tennessee) NSH		Points

Legend
Color	Result
Gold	Winner
Silver	2nd place
Bronze	3rd place
Green	4th–5th place (Top 5)
Light Blue	6th–10th place (Top 10)
Dark Blue	Finished (Outside Top 10)
Purple	Did not finish (DNF)
Red	Did not qualify (DNQ)
Brown	Withdrew (Wth)
Black	Disqualified (DSQ)
White	Did not start (DNS)
White	Race cancelled or abandoned (C)
Blank	Did not participate (DNP)
Blank	Driver replacement (Rpl)
Blank	Race not held (NH)
Blank	Not competing

**In-line notation**
**Bold**	Pole position (1 point; except Indy)
Italics	Ran fastest race lap
^{L}	Led race lap (1 point)
*	Led most race laps (2 points)
^{1–12}	Indy 500 "Fast Twelve" bonus points
^{c}	Qualifying canceled (no bonus point)
RY	Rookie of the Year
R	Rookie

Points	Position														
Points	1st	2nd	3rd	4th	5th	6th	7th	8th	9th	10th	11th	12th	13th	14th	15th
Heat	12	10	8	7	5	4	3	2	1						
Final	25	22	20	18	16	15	14	13	12	11	10	9	8	7	6

Bonuses
Most laps led	3
Position gained	1
Fastest qualifier	1
