= Music City Grand Prix =

IndyCar race in Nashville, Tennessee

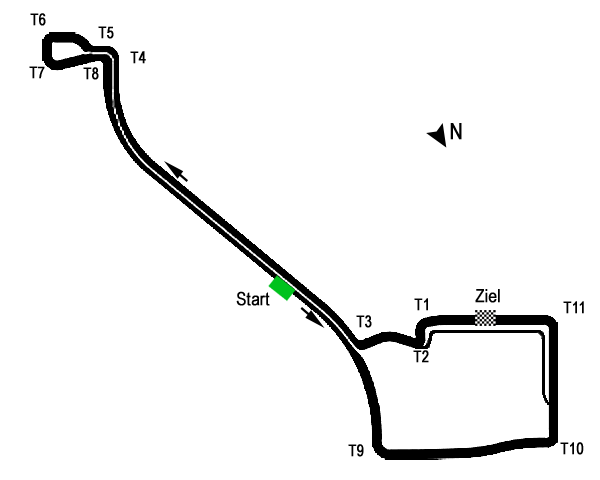

IndyCar Series
- Venue: Nashville Street Circuit
- First race: 2021
- Last race: 2023
- Laps: 80
- Most wins (driver): (Sweden) Marcus Ericsson (1) (New Zealand) Scott Dixon (1) (United States) Kyle Kirkwood (1)
- Most wins (team): Chip Ganassi Racing (2)
- Most wins (manufacturer): Honda (3)

Circuit information
- Length: 3.492 km (2.170 mi)
- Turns: 11
- Lap record: 1:15.7491 ( (New Zealand) Scott McLaughlin, Dallara IR-18, 2022, IndyCar)

The Music City Grand Prix, known as the Big Machine Music City Grand Prix for sponsorship reasons, was an IndyCar Series race held at the Nashville Street Circuit in Nashville, Tennessee. The race's most notable feature was its 3,578 ft (1,091 m) straightaway across the Korean War Veterans Memorial Bridge, which spans the Cumberland River. The bridge layout made the track the only one on the IndyCar circuit and one of the few in the world to cross a significant body of water. Marcus Ericsson won the inaugural event in 2021. The Grand Prix was set to host the season finale from 2024 onwards but was instead moved to the Nashville Superspeedway.

== History ==
=== Background ===
On September 16, 2020, the IndyCar Series announced the addition of the Music City Grand Prix as a street circuit race in downtown Nashville for its 2021 schedule. This announcement came after three years of discussion between Nashville sports and tourism officials and IndyCar executives, which had previously resulted in three failed proposals for a race in Nashville. Two of the three failed attempts, which occurred in 2010 and 2015, respectively, were led by former Pocono Raceway president Joseph Mattioli III. The Music City Grand Prix was privately funded and had a three-year contract for IndyCar Series races. The original event ownership group compiled by event founder Matt Crews included Scott Borchetta, Justin Timberlake, Dale Earnhardt Jr., Justin Marks, Stanton Barrett, and Gil West, among others. Nashville's successful hosting of the 2019 NFL draft was one of the deciding factors in the race becoming a reality, according to Penske Entertainment Corporation President and CEO Mark Miles. Nissan Stadium served as a host for the race for the first three years.

Initially in negotiations, IndyCar CEO Roger Penske was dismissive about the idea of a race in Nashville, citing the permitting requirements and infrastructure costs. Event Founder and CEO Matt Crews recalled, “I’ll never forget when Butch Spyridon (President and CEO of the Nashville Convention & Visitors Corp) looked him in the eyes when Roger was saying, ‘These things are tough. The permitting is tough,’” Crews said. “Butch said, ‘Sir, you’ve just never done business in Nashville, because that’s what we do here: We’re in the event business.’”

Two-time IndyCar Series champion and Nashville-area native Josef Newgarden called the race "the number-one destination outside of the Indy 500". He further opined that "it is going to showcase the town of Nashville probably the best way possible." Nashville mayor John Cooper called the race "a catalyst for our economic recovery".

Ahead of the inaugural race, IndyCar CEO Mark Miles favorably compared the Nashville Grand Prix to the Monaco Grand Prix, saying, "Nashville is going to join Monaco at the absolute top tier of street racing in motorsport across the globe."

The Music City Grand Prix became the first new street circuit race for the IndyCar Series since the Grand Prix of Houston in 2013. It also became Nashville's first IndyCar race since the Indy 200 was held at Nashville Superspeedway between 2001 and 2008. The Music City Grand Prix was scheduled as the sixth street circuit race of the 2021 season, joining the doubleheader at Detroit along with races at Long Beach, St. Petersburg, and Toronto. All of these races have been run since at least 2012, however, and more recent events on street circuits have already become defunct, including races in Baltimore, Boston (which was never held), and Houston.

=== Season finale (2024) ===
On August 3, 2023, IndyCar announced that the Music City Grand Prix would host the season finale from 2024 onwards. The 2024 race would have featured a new layout that would have run through Broadway in Downtown Nashville while retaining the Korean War Memorial Bridge from the original 2021 layout. In addition, the 2024 Music City Grand Prix would have been the 3rd time a street course has held the IndyCar Series season finale (St. Petersburg, 2020 and Long Beach, 2021). However, IndyCar management announced a change of venue to Nashville Superspeedway due to the race conflicting with construction of New Nissan Stadium.

== Circuit design ==
The original Nashville Street Circuit measured 2.170 mi (3.492 km) and included 11 turns. Running adjacent to Nissan Stadium, the circuit's most notable feature was its 3,578 ft (1,091 m) straightaway across the Korean War Veterans Memorial Bridge, which spans the Cumberland River. The bridge layout made the track the only one on the IndyCar circuit and one of the few in the world to cross a significant body of water. Top speeds for the IndyCar race were expected to be around 200 mph (320 km/h). The track varied in width from a minimum of 37 ft (11 m) to a maximum of 80 ft (24 m). As at Mid-Ohio Sports Car Course, the Nashville Street Circuit used a different location for starting the race (between turns 3 and 4) than the finish line. Middle Tennessee State University's School of Concrete and Construction Management created concrete mixes for the track's barriers and pit row. Music City Grand Prix Founder and CEO Matt Crews noted that the event organizers planned to "limit traffic interruptions as much as possible". Track designer Tony Cotman intentionally avoided Nashville's major streets so as not to adversely affect tourism. Discussing the design of the circuit, he called the Korean War Veterans Memorial Bridge "one of those landmarks where you see that bridge on TV or in photos and you’re going to know exactly where it is. It’s like seeing the Queen Mary in the background at Long Beach." Cotman also noted that he expects turns 1, 2, and 7 to be the best passing locations on the circuit.

Pundits and drivers, including former Formula One drivers Romain Grosjean and Marcus Ericsson, compared the Nashville Street Circuit to the Baku City Circuit that hosts the Azerbaijan Grand Prix. The Nashville Street Circuit's downtown section and long straightaways on the Korean War Veterans Memorial Bridge were compared to the castle section and long straights at Baku.

For the 2024 iteration of the race, the course would have been revised. The new course would have maintained the same distance and bridge straights, but only featured seven turns. The new circuit would have gone into the heart of downtown Nashville and passed many of the famous honky tonk bars of the city.

== Race summaries ==
- 2021: The inaugural Music City Grand Prix was held at 5:30 pm EDT on August 8, 2021. During the August 6–8 race weekend, the GT America series, the Trans-Am Series TA2 class, and the Stadium Super Trucks also competed as support series. Marcus Ericsson took victory in the inaugural event despite being involved in an early incident in which his car became airborne after running over the car of Sebastian Bourdais. Polesitter Colton Herta led the most laps, but crashed while attempting to retake the lead from Ericsson. Scott Dixon and James Hinchcliffe completed the podium. The race was incident-filled, with nine caution periods resulting in a total of 33 of the event's 80 laps run under caution conditions and two race stoppages.
- 2022: Scott McLaughlin qualified on pole. The race was delayed by an hour and a half due to thunderstorms, though the track was dried before the start of the race. McLaughlin held the lead through the early stint of the race before a large caution period saw Scott Dixon cycle to the front around lap 54 by virtue of being the first one to make his last pitstop. Dixon would hold the lead for the remainder of the race despite his car suffering floor damage earlier in the race that took away significant downforce. McLaughlin made a late charge to a near photo finish with Dixon by virtue of conserving his push to pass but ultimately settled for second place. Álex Palou rounded out the podium. Much like the inaugural Music City GP the race was incident filled, with eight total caution periods during the race.
- 2023: Scott McLaughlin qualified on pole for the second consecutive year. After a brief early caution caused by David Malukas, the race ran almost entirely under a green flag, contrasting from the first two races in Nashville. McLaughlin lost the lead to Kyle Kirkwood in the second sequence of green flag pit stops. A late red flag caused by a three car pileup led to a end of race shootout between Kirkwood, McLaughlin, Álex Palou, and Josef Newgarden for the podium. Kirkwood prevailed for the win, with McLaughlin again settling for second place. Palou rounded out the podium.

== Race results ==
=== NTT IndyCar Series ===
Season	Date	Driver	Team	Chassis	Engine	Race Distance		Race Time	Average Speed (mph)	Report	Ref
Season	Date	Driver	Team	Chassis	Engine	Laps	Miles (km)	Race Time	Average Speed (mph)	Report	Ref
2021	August 8	(Sweden) Marcus Ericsson	Chip Ganassi Racing	Dallara	Honda	80	173.6 mi (279.4 km)	2:18:50	72.607	Report	
2022	August 7	(New Zealand) Scott Dixon	Chip Ganassi Racing	Dallara	Honda	80	173.6 mi (279.4 km)	2:06:24	79.744	Report	
2023	August 6	(United States) Kyle Kirkwood	Andretti Autosport	Dallara	Honda	80	173.6 mi (279.4 km)	1:58:02	85.396	Report	

== Support events ==
=== GT America Series ===
Season	Date	Winning driver
2021	August 7	(United States) James Sofronas
2021	August 8	(United States) Bret Curtis
2022	August 6	(United States) Onofrio Triarsi
2022	August 7	(United States) Justin Wetherill
2023	August 5	(United States) Johnny O'Connell
2023	August 6	(United States) Jason Daskalos

=== Trans-Am Series TA2 ===
Season	Date	Winning driver
2021	August 7	(United States) Mike Skeen
2022	August 6	(United States) Brent Crews
2023	August 5	(United States) Connor Zilisch

=== Stadium Super Trucks ===
Season	Date	Winning driver
2021	August 7	(United States) Robby Gordon
2021	August 8	(United States) Robert Stout
2022	August 6	(Australia) Matthew Brabham
2022	August 7	(United States) Gavin Harlien
2023	August 5	(United States) Robert Stout
2023	August 6	(United States) Robby Gordon

=== Indy Lights / Indy NXT ===
Season	Date	Winning driver	Winning team
2022	August 7	(Sweden) Linus Lundqvist	HMD Motorsports with Dale Coyne Racing
2023	August 6	(Denmark) Christian Rasmussen	HMD Motorsports with Dale Coyne Racing

=== Toyota GR Cup America ===
Season	Date	Winning driver
2023	August 6	(United States) Tyler Gonzalez

== Lap records ==
As of August 2023, the fastest official race lap records at the Nashville Street Circuit are listed as:

Category	Time	Driver	Vehicle	Event
Grand Prix Circuit (2021–2023): 2.170 mi (3.492 km)
IndyCar	1:15.7491	Scott McLaughlin	Dallara IR-18	2022 Big Machine Music City Grand Prix
Indy NXT	1:20.8265	Hunter McElrea	Dallara IL-15	2023 Nashville Indy NXT round
GT3	1:28.883	Jason Daskalos	Mercedes-AMG GT3 Evo	2023 Nashville GT America round
Trans-Am TA2	1:31.350	Connor Zilisch	Chevrolet Camaro Trans-Am	2023 Nashville Trans-Am round
SRO GT2	1:32.647	Elias Sabo	Audi R8 LMS GT2	2021 Nashville GT America round
GT4	1:34.624	Chris Cagnazzi	Mercedes-AMG GT4	2022 Nashville GT America round
Toyota GR Cup	1:43.082	Tyler Gonzalez	Toyota GR86	2023 Nashville Toyota GR Cup North America round

Preceded by Hy-Vee Homefront 250	IndyCar Series; Music City Grand Prix	Succeeded by Gallagher Grand Prix
