= Demolition Ranch =

American YouTube channel

DemolitionRanch
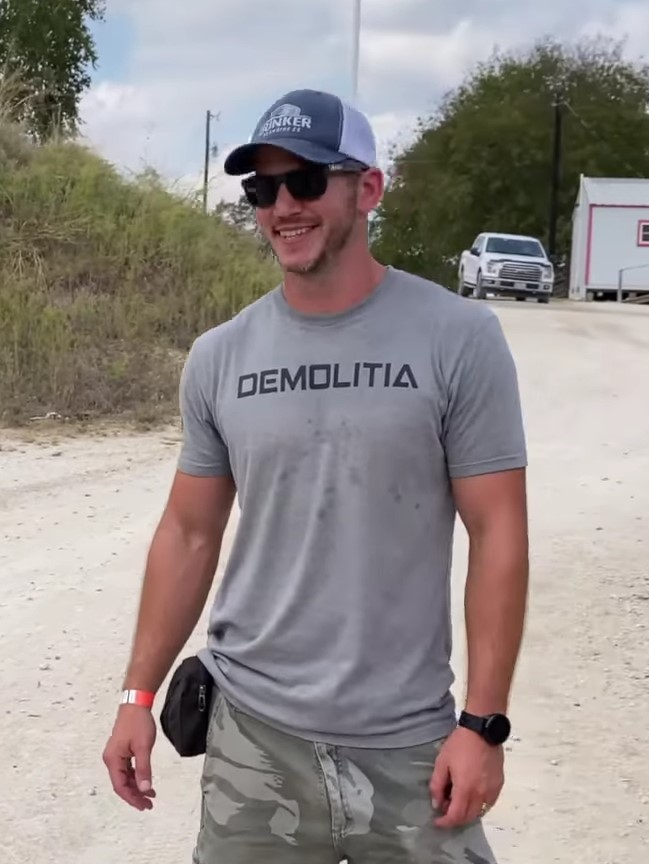
- Matt Carriker in 2019
- Born: Matt Carriker

YouTube information
- Channel: DemolitionRanch
- Years active: 2011–2025
- Genre: Firearms/Weaponry
- Subscribers: 11.8 million
- Views: 2.54 billion
- Last updated: July 27, 2025

Demolition Ranch is a firearms YouTube channel owned by Matt Carriker, a YouTuber based in Boerne, Texas. The channel was active between 2011 and 2025, when Carriker announced his retirement from YouTube.

== History ==
Founded in 2011 and having around 11 million subscribers, Demolition Ranch published content related to firearms and their capabilities. USA Today described Demolition Ranch as "a variety show of shooting, reviews and entertainment around guns". Weapons that Demolition Ranch has tested and that were mentioned in the media include a golf ball cannon, a double-barreled AR rifle, and custom shotgun shells. In addition, Demolition Ranch has videos of entertaining firearms-related activities such as shooting at an armored car's door, microwaving a live grenade, and shooting a truck with a tank.

In 2018, Demolition Ranch had to remove some of their videos due to new YouTube rules.

In July 2024, Demolition Ranch received media coverage when images and videos showed that the perpetrator of the attempted assassination of Donald Trump in Pennsylvania was wearing a Demolition Ranch shirt during the shooting. Carriker condemned the shooting and stressed the channel "was never meant to incite violence or hate."

On January 28, 2025, Carriker announced he would be leaving YouTube in order to spend more time with his family.

== Carriker's other ventures ==
=== Vet Ranch ===
In addition to owning the Demolition Ranch YouTube channel, Carriker is a veterinarian, and owns the veterinary YouTube channel Vet Ranch, which was founded in 2014 and has around 2 million subscribers. Carriker graduated from Texas A&M University's College of Veterinary Medicine and Biomedical Sciences in 2008. The channel treats dogs, cats, and other animals in poor medical condition, often taken from the animal shelter San Antonio Pets Alive (SAPA). The channel follows the animals during their veterinary treatment, including surgical procedures, until they are fully recovered. Profits from the channel's ad revenue are used to pay for the surgeries that the animals receive. Karri McCreary, a fellow Texas A&M graduate and veterinarian, also features prominently on the channel.

Carriker has stated that in general, injured animals have no chance of getting adopted, and that Vet Ranch gets these animals healthy then sends them to a no-kill shelter for adoption. Some conditions that they treat on Vet Ranch include mange, broken legs, blindness, malnutrition, and animals hit by cars. Carriker sums up the channel as "we show the most exciting five minutes of those few months" of veterinary treatment.

=== Other businesses ===
Carriker also has a vlogging channel called Off The Ranch (previously named Matt Carriker), the influencer clothing company Bunker Branding, and the Desperado Resort in Boerne, Texas. Upon retiring from YouTube, Carriker revealed he also listed the Desperado Resort for sale.

Carriker is interested in off-road racing, having raced in the Mint 400 and working on crews competing in the Baja 1000. In 2022, he ran the Stadium Super Trucks weekend at Bristol Motor Speedway; Carriker finished 11th and 12th in the two races.
