= United States Grand Prix East =

United States Grand Prix East may refer to:

- the United States Grand Prix held at Watkins Glen between 1976 and 1980, to distinguish it from the United States Grand Prix West held at Long Beach in the same years
- the Detroit Grand Prix held in Detroit from 1982 to 1988, to distinguish it from the United States Grand Prix West held at Long Beach (1982-1983) and the United States Grand Prix held in Dallas in 1984
