= Toyota Pro/Celebrity Race =

- Location: Long Beach Street Circuit; 33°45′59″N 118°11′34″W
- Corporate sponsor: Toyota
- First race: 1977
- Last race: 2016
- Distance: 19.7 mi (31.7 km)
- Laps: 10
- Most wins (driver): Dan Gurney (4); Alfonso Ribeiro (4)

Circuit information
- Surface: Asphalt
- Length: 1.968 mi (3.167 km)
- Turns: 11

The Toyota Pro/Celebrity Race was an annual 10-lap auto race held each April from 1977 until 2016 as part of the United States Grand Prix West, and later the Toyota Grand Prix of Long Beach weekend at Long Beach Street Circuit. Beginning in 1991, the event raised money for "Racing for Kids," a national fund-raising program benefiting children's hospitals in Long Beach and Orange County.

The TPCR pitted celebrities against professional racers from various types of motor racing. They raced in identically prepared cars built by Toyota or Toyota owned Scion. From its inception until 2005, the drivers drove showroom stock Toyota Celicas. Scion tCs were used from 2006 to 2012, and the Scion FR-S began use in 2013. Celebrity contestants ranged from Hollywood's "A-list" elite, budding young stars and starlets, professional sports figures, local Southern California television and radio personalities and selected Toyota dealers. One seat was put up for auction, and the high bidder participated in the race. Often, a member of the broadcast team for the feature race would race in the event; Ken Squier, Paul Page, Jack Arute, and Jamie Little (the 2008 winner) have all participated in the race while broadcasting the feature.

All celebrities were given thorough practice, safety, and training sessions before competing, and no serious injuries occurred, despite a large number of crashes throughout the years. Several celebrities who have taken part in the TPCR have gone on to take up auto racing as a part-time hobby or as team owners.

The celebrities received a 30-second head start to begin the race against the professionals and past champions. In 2015, actor Alfonso Ribeiro won while classed as a pro (thus starting with a 30-second handicap) and thereby became the third driver to have won the event in both "celebrity" and "pro" classifications, after Adam Carolla in 2013, and Sean Patrick Flanery in 1997/1998.

On March 11, 2016, it was announced that the 2016 running of the event would be the final event due to Toyota moving its headquarters from nearby Torrance to Texas.

== Winners ==
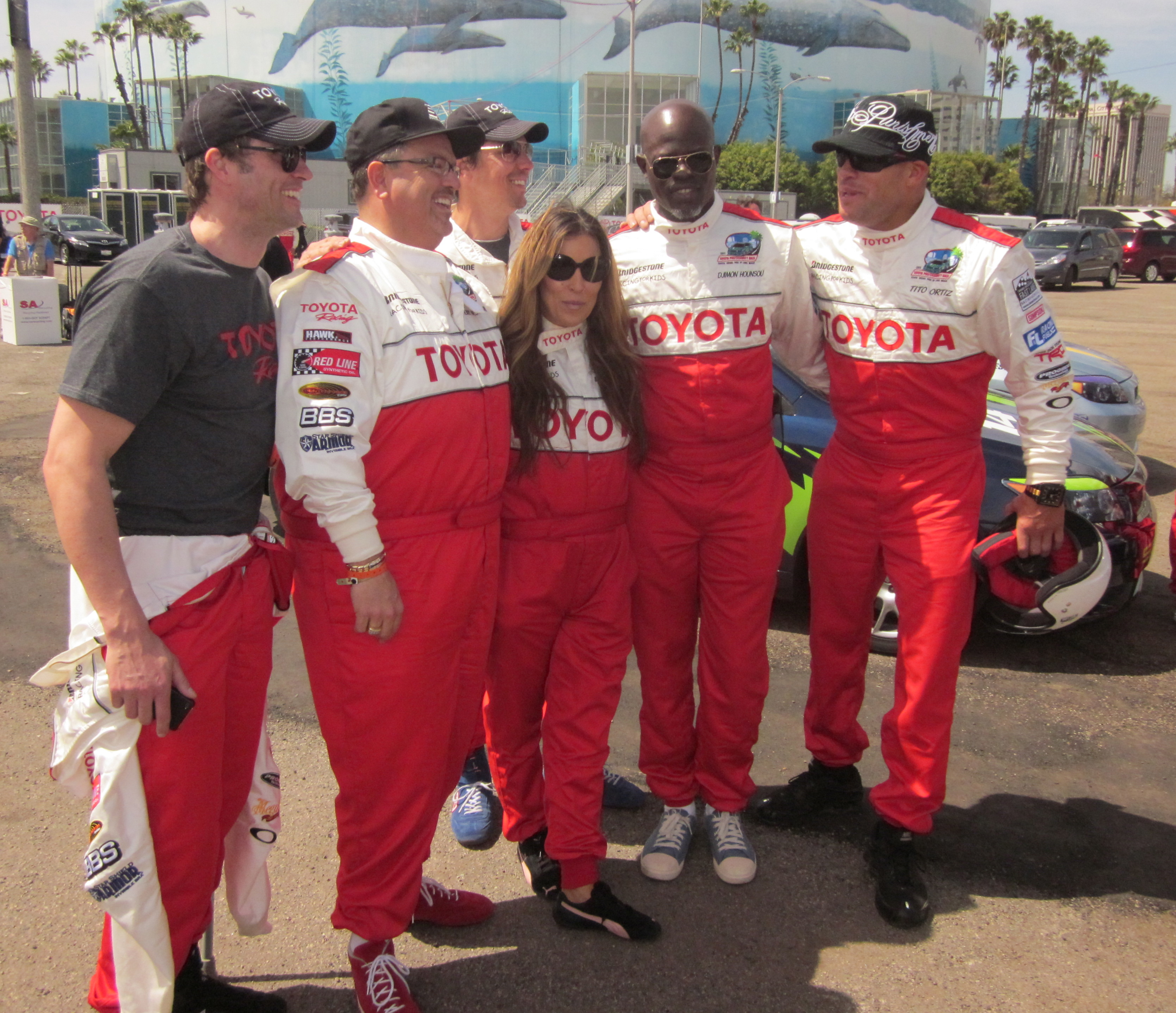
From left: Daniel Goddard, Jerry Westlund (winner of the charity auction for a seat in the race), Michael Trucco, Jillian Barberie, Djimon Hounsou and Tito Ortiz at the Toyota Grand Prix Celebrity Race 2011

Year	Pro winner	Celebrity winner
2016	Max Papis	Alfonso Ribeiro*
2015	Alfonso Ribeiro*	Dave Pasant
2014	Al Unser Jr.	Brett Davern*
2013	Adam Carolla	Rutledge Wood*
2012	Fredric Aasbø	Adam Carolla*
2011	Ken Gushi	William Fichtner*
2010	Jimmy Vasser*	Brian Austin Green
2009	Al Unser Jr.*	Keanu Reeves
2008	Mike Skinner	Jamie Little*
2007	Mike Skinner	Dave Mirra*
2006	Todd Bodine	Bucky Lasek*
2005	Rhys Millen*	Frankie Muniz
2004	Max Papis*	Chris McDonald
2003	Jeremy McGrath	Peter Reckell*
2002	Danica Patrick	Dara Torres*
2001	Scott Pruett*	Tom Rudnai
2000	Derek Daly	Josh Brolin*
1999	Roger Mears	Shaun Palmer*
1998	Sean Patrick Flanery*	Andy Lauer
1997	Tommy Kendall	Sean Patrick Flanery*
1996	Jimmy Vasser*	Grant Show*
1995	Rod Millen	Alfonso Ribeiro*
1994	Brian Redman	Alfonso Ribeiro*
1993	Eddie Lawson*	Rick Kirkham
1992	P. J. Jones*	Joe Amato
1991	Parnelli Jones	Donny Osmond*
1990	Bobby Rahal*	Stephen Baldwin
1989	Parnelli Jones	Rick Schroder*
1988	Dan Gurney	Paul Moyer*
1987	Juan Manuel Fangio II	Jason Bateman*
1986	Dan Gurney*	Perry King
1985	Al Unser Jr.*	Lorenzo Lamas
1984	David Hobbs*	Robert Hays
1983	Dan Gurney*	Ted Nugent
1982	Dan Gurney	Caitlyn Jenner*- (Note: Competed as Bruce Jenner; she changed her name to Caitlyn due to gender transition in 2015.)
1981	Elio de Angelis	Robert Hays*
1980	Parnelli Jones*	Gene Hackman
1979	Al Unser	Caitlyn Jenner*-
1978	Gordon Johncock*	James Brolin
1977	Sam Posey*	Shelly Novack

* = overall champion

*- = winner has changed their name since winning race. Their name shown is their current name.

- James (1978) and Josh (2000) Brolin is the only father-son combination to win the celebrity portion of the event. However, Josh had the distinction of being an overall winner, unlike his father.
- The Unsers and the Jones' are the only father-son combination to win the Pro portion of the event, with Parnelli Jones winning multiple times.
- Paul Moyer, at the time of his 1988 win, was a news anchor with KABC-TV in Los Angeles.
- After Amato's win, Grand Prix officials required NHRA drag racers to race as professionals.
- After Alfonso Ribeiro won two consecutive races, TGPLB rules required past celebrity winners must race as professionals.
- For the 20th Anniversary race in 1996, there were no professional drivers.
- Tom Rudnai is general manager of a local Toyota dealership
- Three times, the play-by-play announcer for the main event was in the Pro/Celebrity race – Paul Page twice (once raced against his own pit reporter, Jack Arute), and Ken Squier in the early years, when it was the United States Grand Prix West.
