= Grand Prix of Long Beach =

IndyCar Series race in Long Beach, California

Acura Grand Prix of Long Beach

IndyCar Series
- Location: Long Beach Street Circuit; 33°45′59″N 118°11′34″W
- Corporate sponsor: Acura (Honda)
- First race: 1975
- First ICS race: 2009
- Distance: 177.12 mi (285.05 km)
- Laps: 90
- Previous names: Long Beach Grand Prix (1975); United States Grand Prix West (1976–1983); Toyota Grand Prix of the United States (1980–1981, 1983); Toyota Grand Prix of Long Beach (1984–2018)
- Most wins (driver): Al Unser Jr. (6)
- Most wins (team): Chip Ganassi Racing (8)
- Most wins (manufacturer): Chassis: Dallara (17); Engine: Honda (19); Tires: Firestone (23)

Circuit information
- Length: 1.968 mi (3.167 km)
- Turns: 11

The Grand Prix of Long Beach (known as the Acura Grand Prix of Long Beach since 2019 for naming rights reasons) is an IndyCar Series race held on the Long Beach Street Circuit in Long Beach, California. It was on the calendar of Championship Auto Racing Teams (CART) and that of its successor the Champ Car World Series (CCWS) from 1984 to 2008, with the 2008 race being the final CCWS race prior to the formal unification and end of the open-wheel "split" between CCWS and the Indy Racing League (IRL). Since 2009, the race has been part of the unified IndyCar Series. The race is typically held in April. It is the second-oldest continuously running event in American open-wheel racing behind only the Indianapolis 500, and is considered one of the most prestigious events on the circuit.

The Long Beach Grand Prix is the longest running major street circuit race held in North America. It was started in 1975 as a Formula 5000 race by event founder Christopher Pook, and became a Formula One event, called the United States Grand Prix West, in 1976.

In 1984, the race switched from a Formula One race to a CART event. Support races over the years have included Indy Lights, IMSA, Atlantics, Pirelli World Challenge, Trans-Am Series, Formula D, Stadium Super Trucks, Formula E, and the Toyota Pro/Celebrity Race. Toyota was a sponsor of the event since its beginning and title sponsor from 1980 to 2018, believed to be the longest continuously running sports sponsorship in the U.S.

The Long Beach Grand Prix in April is the single largest event in the city of Long Beach. Attendance for the weekend regularly reaches or exceeds 200,000 people. In 2006, the Long Beach Motorsports Walk of Fame was created to honor selected past winners and key contributors to the sport of auto racing.

== History ==
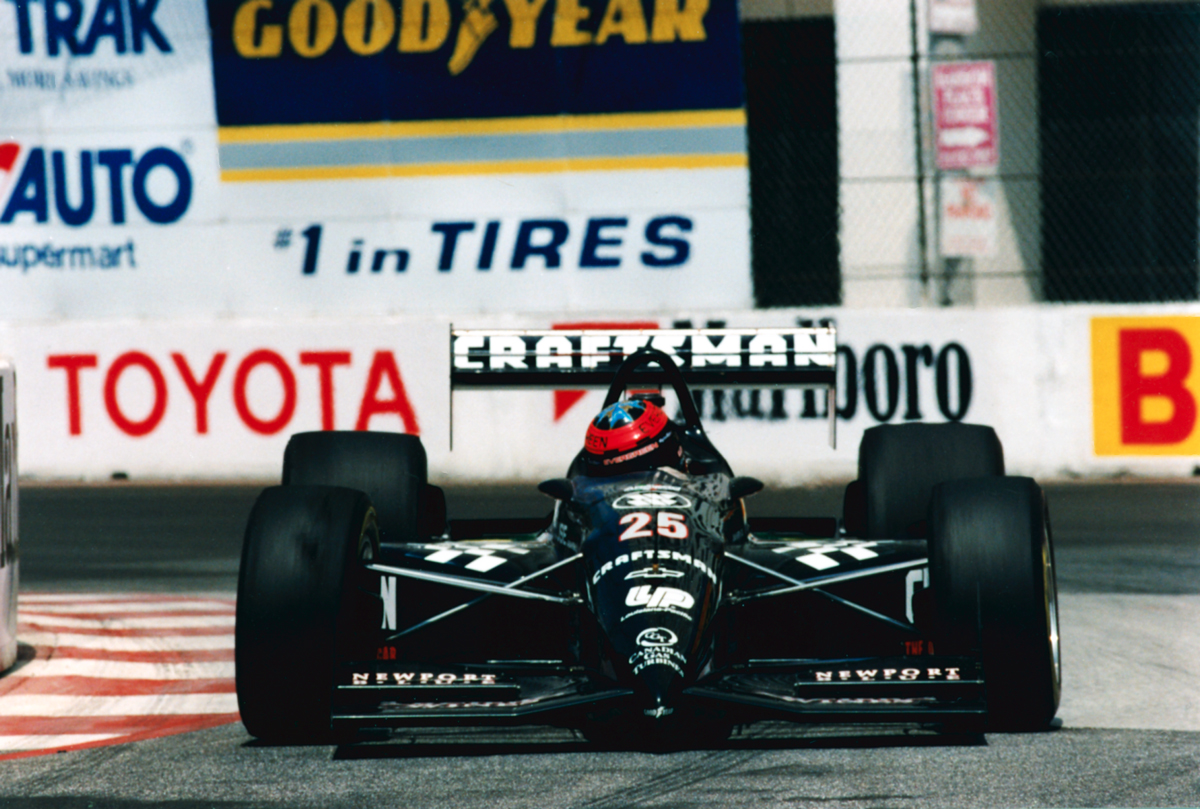
Mark Smith driving in the 1993 race

The Long Beach Grand Prix was the brainchild of promoter Chris Pook, a former travel agent from England. Pook was inspired by the Monaco Grand Prix, and believed that a similar event had the potential to succeed in the Southern California area. The city of Long Beach was selected, approximately 25-mile (40 km) south of downtown Los Angeles. A waterfront circuit, near the Port of Long Beach was laid out on city streets, and despite the area at the time being mostly a depressed, industrial port city, the first event drew 30,000 fans. The inaugural race was held in September 1975 as part of the Formula 5000 series.

In 1976, the United States Grand Prix West was created, providing two grand prix races annually in the United States for a time. Long Beach became a Formula One event for 1976 and the race was moved to March or April. Meanwhile, the United States Grand Prix East at Watkins Glen International was experiencing a noticeably steady decline. Despite gaining a reputation of being demanding and rough on equipment, Long Beach almost immediately gained prominence owing much to its pleasant weather, picturesque setting, and close proximity to Los Angeles and the glitzy Hollywood area. When Watkins Glen was dropped from the Formula One calendar after 1980, the now-established Long Beach began to assume an even more prominent status.

Despite exciting races and strong attendance, the event was not financially successful as a Formula One event. The promoter was risking a meager $100,000 profit against a $6–7 million budget. Fearing that one poor running could bankrupt the event, Pook convinced city leaders to change the race to a CART Indy car event beginning in 1984. In short time, the event grew to prominence on the Indy car circuit and has been credited with triggering a renaissance in the city of Long Beach. The race was used to market the city, and in the years since the race's inception, many dilapidated and condemned buildings have been replaced with high-rise hotels and tourist attractions.

The event served as a CART/Champ Car World Series race from 1984 to 2008, then became an IndyCar Series race event in 2009. The 2017 race was the 43rd running, and the 34th consecutive as an IndyCar race, one of the longest continuously running events in the history of American open-wheel car racing. On three occasions (1984, 1985 and 1987) the race served as the CART season opener. In seven separate seasons (1986, 1988, 1989, 1990, 1992, 1993 and 1994), it served as the final race before the Indianapolis 500.

Due to the COVID-19 pandemic, the 2020 race was canceled as part of the City of Long Beach's ban on events with estimated attendance of more than 250. The following year, as a preparatory measure for the pandemic's effects on the schedule, the race was moved from its traditional April date to September 26, and served as the season finale. With the rise of the Delta variant there were concerns from IndyCar and the event promoters that the race would have to be canceled for 2021 or run with an attendance cap, but the promoters and the city of Long Beach were able to work out a compromise on safety measures and rapid testing to allow the event to go forward with full capacity.

The Grand Prix returned to its traditional April date for the 2022 season.

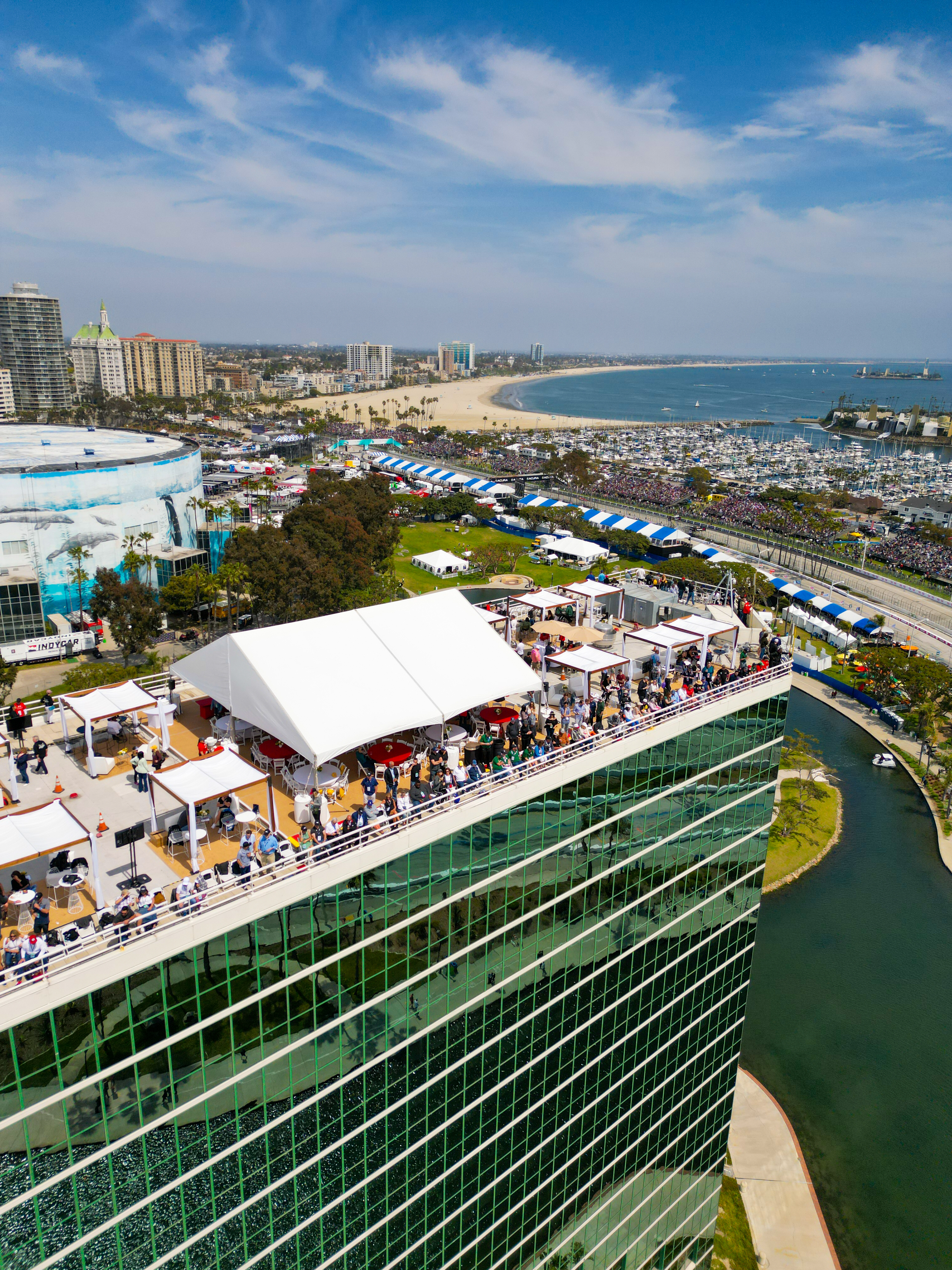
Crowds for the 2023 Grand Prix of Long Beach

On March 28, 2024, it was announced that former Champ Car owner Gerald Forsythe would buy the 50% stake in race organizer Grand Prix Association of Long Beach owned by the estate of the late Kevin Kalkhoven, giving him full ownership of the race. Later that year, IndyCar Series owner Penske Entertainment acquired the race from Forsythe.

=== First wins ===
Despite the challenging nature of the course, the Grand Prix of Long Beach has produced the first Indy/Champ Car victories for several drivers. Drivers who won their first career Indycar race at Long Beach include Michael Andretti, Paul Tracy, Juan Pablo Montoya, Mike Conway, Takuma Sato, and Kyle Kirkwood. For Michael Andretti, the Long Beach Grand Prix has the distinction of being his first career Indycar win (1986), and 42nd and final career Indycar win (2002).

James Hinchcliffe won his first-career Indy Lights race at Long Beach in 2010, then followed it up with an IndyCar Series win at the track in 2017. In 2005, Katherine Legge won the Atlantic Championship support race at Long Beach, her first start in the series. In doing so, she became the first female driver to win a developmental open-wheel race in North America.

== Events ==
=== Formula 5000 and Formula One ===
The inaugural race was held as part of the Formula 5000 series. From 1976 to 1983 the event was a Formula One race, commonly known as the United States Grand Prix West.

The City of Long Beach and the Grand Prix Association signed a contract in 2014 to hold the Grand Prix as part of the IndyCar Series through 2018, with optional extensions available through 2020. In 2016, the Long Beach City Council issued an RFP, opening up consideration for returning the event to a Formula One race as early as 2019. In August 2017, after a study was completed and after discussions, the switch to Formula One was rejected. The city council voted unanimously to continue the event as part of the IndyCar Series.

=== 2008 Long Beach/Motegi "split weekend" ===
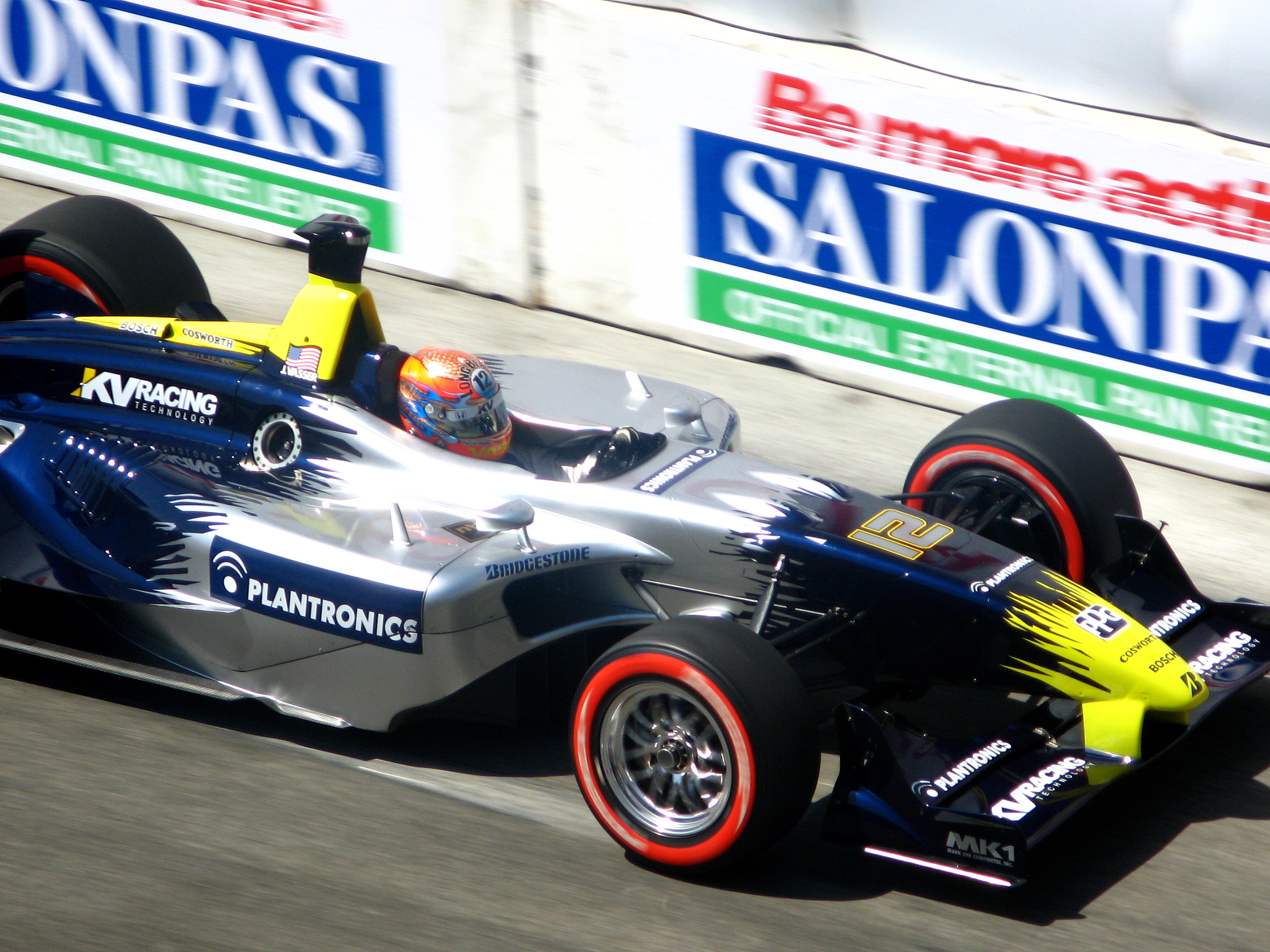
Jimmy Vasser at the 2008 Grand Prix of Long Beach

During negotiations which led to the unification of the Champ Car World Series and the IRL IndyCar Series in 2008, a scheduling conflict arose between the IndyCar race held at Twin Ring Motegi (April 19) and the Champ Car race at Long Beach (April 20). Neither party was able to reschedule their event.

A compromise was made to create a unique "split weekend" of races at Motegi and Long Beach. The existing Indy Racing League teams would compete in Japan, while the ex-Champ Car teams raced at Long Beach. Both races paid equal points towards the 2008 IndyCar Series championship. The ex-Champ Car teams utilized the Panoz DP01 machines, the cars that would have been used in 2008 had the unification not taken place. The 2008 Long Beach Grand Prix was billed as the "final Champ Car race".

=== Drifting ===
Beginning in 2005, the event included a demonstration by participants in the Formula D drifting series. Since 2006 Formula D has held the first round of their pro series on Turns 9–11 on the weekend prior to the Grand Prix. In 2013 the Motegi Super Drift Challenge, a drifting competition, was added on the GP weekend, using the same Turn 9–11 course as Formula D. The Motegi Super Drift Challenge is the only event during the GP that runs at night, under floodlights.

A new circuit, utilising the Convention Center area that includes the exit of Turn 11 run backwards, will be used for Formula D's second round, added in 2025 to replace Irwindale as the championship after its closure and demolition.

=== North American Touring Car Championship ===
Long Beach hosted the opening round of the 1997 North American Touring Car Championship, being won by Neil Crompton in a Honda Accord.

=== Formula E ===
A modified version of the Long Beach Grand Prix track was used during the Long Beach ePrix of the FIA Formula E Championship. The track is 2.1 km (1.3 mi) in length and features seven turns. Admission to the first event was free: "the free admission will afford everyone the opportunity to come out and witness this historic and unique event", Jim Michaelian, president of the Grand Prix Assn. of Long Beach, said in a statement. The ePrix was held once again in 2016. However, it was not renewed for the third Formula E season in 2017.

== Winners ==
Season	Date	Driver	Team	Chassis	Engine	Tires	Race distance		Race time	Average speed (mph)	Report
Season	Date	Driver	Team	Chassis	Engine	Tires	Laps	Miles (km)	Race time	Average speed (mph)	Report
Formula 5000
1975	Sept 28	(United Kingdom) Brian Redman	Carl A. Haas Racing	Lola T332	Chevrolet	Goodyear	50	101 (162.543)	1:10:12	86.325	Report
Formula One
See United States Grand Prix West
CART/Champ Car World Series
1984	March 31	(United States) Mario Andretti (2)	Newman/Haas Racing	Lola (2)	Cosworth (6)	Goodyear (7)	112	187.04 (301.011)	2:15:23	82.898	Report
1985	April 14	(United States) Mario Andretti (3)	Newman/Haas Racing (2)	Lola (3)	Cosworth (7)	Goodyear (8)	90	150.3 (241.884)	1:42:50	87.694	Report
1986	April 13	(United States) Michael Andretti	Kraco Racing	March	Cosworth (8)	Goodyear (9)	95	158.65 (255.322)	1:57:34	80.965	Report
1987	April 5	(United States) Mario Andretti (4)	Newman/Haas Racing (3)	Lola (4)	Chevrolet (2)	Goodyear (10)	95	158.65 (255.322)	1:51:33	85.33	Report
1988	April 17	(United States) Al Unser Jr.	Galles Racing	March (2)	Chevrolet (3)	Goodyear (11)	95	158.65 (255.322)	1:53:47	83.655	Report
1989	April 16	(United States) Al Unser Jr. (2)	Galles Racing (2)	Lola (5)	Chevrolet (4)	Goodyear (12)	95	158.65 (255.322)	1:51:19	85.503	Report
1990	April 22	(United States) Al Unser Jr. (3)	Galles/Kraco Racing (3)	Lola (6)	Chevrolet (5)	Goodyear (13)	95	158.65 (255.322)	1:53:00	84.227	Report
1991	April 14	(United States) Al Unser Jr. (4)	Galles/Kraco Racing (4)	Lola (7)	Chevrolet (6)	Goodyear (14)	95	158.65 (255.322)	1:57:14	81.195	Report
1992	April 12	(United States) Danny Sullivan	Galles/Kraco Racing (5)	Galmer	Chevrolet (7)	Goodyear (15)	105	166.53 (268.004)	1:48:56	91.945	Report
1993	April 18	(Canada) Paul Tracy	Team Penske	Penske	Chevrolet (8)	Goodyear (16)	105	166.53 (268.004)	1:47:36	93.089	Report
1994	April 17	(United States) Al Unser Jr. (5)	Team Penske (2)	Penske (2)	Ilmor	Goodyear (17)	105	166.53 (268.004)	1:40:53	99.283	Report
1995	April 9	(United States) Al Unser Jr. (6)	Team Penske (3)	Penske (3)	Mercedes-Benz	Goodyear (18)	105	166.53 (268.004)	1:49:32	91.422	Report
1996	April 14	(United States) Jimmy Vasser	Chip Ganassi Racing	Reynard	Honda	Firestone	105	166.53 (268.004)	1:44:02	96.281	Report
1997	April 13	(Italy) Alex Zanardi	Chip Ganassi Racing (2)	Reynard (2)	Honda (2)	Firestone (2)	105	166.53 (268.004)	1:46:17	93.999	Report
1998	April 5	(Italy) Alex Zanardi (2)	Chip Ganassi Racing (3)	Reynard (3)	Honda (3)	Firestone (3)	105	166.53 (268.004)	1:51:29	88.946	Report
1999	April 18	(Colombia) Juan Pablo Montoya	Chip Ganassi Racing (4)	Reynard (4)	Honda (4)	Firestone (4)	85	155.04 (249.512)	1:45:48	87.915	Report
2000	April 16	(Canada) Paul Tracy (2)	Team Green	Reynard (5)	Honda (5)	Firestone (5)	82	161.376 (259.709)	1:57:11	82.626	Report
2001	April 8	(Brazil) Hélio Castroneves	Team Penske (4)	Reynard (6)	Honda (6)	Firestone (6)	82	161.376 (259.709)	1:52:17	86.223	Report
2002	April 14	(United States) Michael Andretti (2)	Team Green (2)	Reynard (7)	Honda (7)	Bridgestone	90	177.12 (285.047)	2:02:14	86.935	Report
2003	April 13	(Canada) Paul Tracy (3)	Forsythe Racing	Lola (8)	Ford–Cosworth (9)	Bridgestone (2)	90	177.12 (285.047)	1:56:01	91.59	Report
2004	April 18	(Canada) Paul Tracy (4)	Forsythe Racing (2)	Lola (9)	Ford–Cosworth (10)	Bridgestone (3)	81	159.408 (256.542)	1:44:12	91.785	Report
2005	April 10	(France) Sébastien Bourdais	Newman/Haas Racing (4)	Lola (10)	Ford–Cosworth (11)	Bridgestone (4)	81	159.408 (256.542)	1:46:29	89.811	Report
2006	April 9	(France) Sébastien Bourdais (2)	Newman/Haas Racing (5)	Lola (11)	Ford–Cosworth (12)	Bridgestone (5)	74	145.632 (234.371)	1:40:07	87.268	Report
2007	April 15	(France) Sébastien Bourdais (3)	Newman/Haas/Lanigan Racing (6)	Panoz	Cosworth (13)	Bridgestone (6)	78	153.504 (247.04)	1:40:43	91.432	Report
IndyCar Series
2008*	April 20	(Australia) Will Power	KV Racing Technology	Panoz (2)	Cosworth (14)	Bridgestone (7)	83	163.344 (262.876)	1:45:25	92.964	Report
2009	April 19	(United Kingdom) Dario Franchitti	Chip Ganassi Racing (5)	Dallara	Honda (8)	Firestone (7)	85	167.28 (269.211)	1:58:47	84.491	Report
2010	April 18	(United States) Ryan Hunter-Reay	Andretti Autosport	Dallara (2)	Honda (9)	Firestone (8)	85	167.28 (269.211)	1:47:13	93.619	Report
2011	April 17	(United Kingdom) Mike Conway	Andretti Autosport (2)	Dallara (3)	Honda (10)	Firestone (9)	85	167.28 (269.211)	1:53:11	88.676	Report
2012	April 15	(Australia) Will Power (2)	Team Penske (5)	Dallara (4)	Chevrolet (9)	Firestone (10)	85	167.28 (269.211)	1:54:02	88.021	Report
2013	April 21	(Japan) Takuma Sato	A. J. Foyt Enterprises	Dallara (5)	Honda (11)	Firestone (11)	80	157.44 (253.375)	1:50:09	85.763	Report
2014	April 13	(United Kingdom) Mike Conway (2)	Ed Carpenter Racing	Dallara (6)	Chevrolet (10)	Firestone (12)	80	157.44 (253.375)	1:54:42	82.362	Report
2015	April 19	(New Zealand) Scott Dixon	Chip Ganassi Racing (6)	Dallara (7)	Chevrolet (11)	Firestone (13)	80	157.44 (253.375)	1:37:35	96.8	Report
2016	April 17	(France) Simon Pagenaud	Team Penske (6)	Dallara (8)	Chevrolet (12)	Firestone (14)	80	157.44 (253.375)	1:33:54	100.592	Report
2017	April 9	(Canada) James Hinchcliffe	Schmidt Peterson Motorsports	Dallara (9)	Honda (12)	Firestone (15)	85	167.28 (269.211)	1:50:29	90.845	Report
2018	April 15	(United States) Alexander Rossi	Andretti Autosport (3)	Dallara (10)	Honda (13)	Firestone (16)	85	167.28 (269.211)	1:53:15	88.622	Report
2019	April 14	(United States) Alexander Rossi (2)	Andretti Autosport (4)	Dallara (11)	Honda (14)	Firestone (17)	85	167.28 (269.211)	1:41:35	98.794	Report
2020	Canceled in response to the COVID-19 pandemic										
2021	September 26*	(United States) Colton Herta	Andretti Autosport with Curb Agajanian (5)	Dallara (12)	Honda (15)	Firestone (18)	85	167.28 (269.211)	1:49:10	91.935	Report
2022	April 10	(United States) Josef Newgarden	Team Penske (7)	Dallara (13)	Chevrolet (13)	Firestone (19)	85	167.28 (269.211)	1:46:48	93.977	Report
2023	April 16	(United States) Kyle Kirkwood	Andretti Autosport (6)	Dallara (14)	Honda (16)	Firestone (20)	85	167.28 (269.211)	1:43:17	97.171	Report
2024	April 21	(New Zealand) Scott Dixon (2)	Chip Ganassi Racing (7)	Dallara (15)	Honda (17)	Firestone (21)	85	167.28 (269.211)	1:43:03	98.350	Report
2025	April 13	(United States) Kyle Kirkwood (2)	Andretti Global (7)	Dallara (16)	Honda (18)	Firestone (22)	90	177.12 (285.05)	1:45:51	100.395	Report
2026	April 19	(Spain) Álex Palou	Chip Ganassi Racing (8)	Dallara (17)	Honda (19)	Firestone (23)	90	177.12 (285.05)	1:49:09	97.356	Report

=== Notes ===
- 2008: Race sanctioned by the IndyCar Series; used cars and regulations from the Champ Car World Series and held on same day as Indy Japan 300 due to scheduling conflict as a result of reunification.
- 2021: Race rescheduled to September due to COVID-19 pandemic

=== Support race winners ===
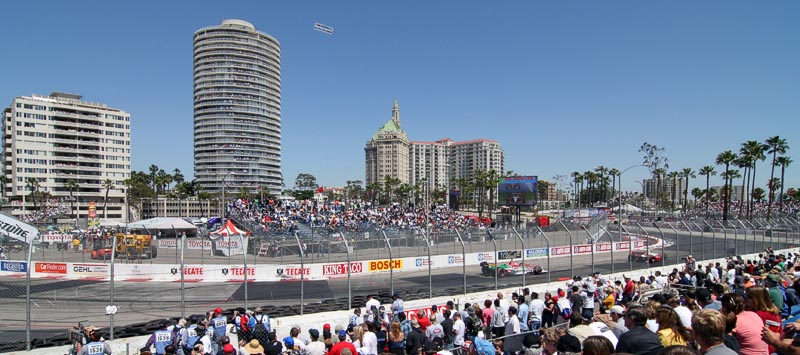
2005 Long Beach Grand Prix, showing turn 10 and the Long Beach skyline, including the Villa Riviera

==== Road to Indy ====
Atlantic Championship history
Season	Date	Driver
1978	April 1	(United States) Howdy Holmes
1979	April 7	(United States) Tom Gloy
1980	March 29	(United States) Tom Gloy
1981	March 14	(Australia) Geoff Brabham
1982	April 3	(Australia) Geoff Brabham
1983 – 1988	Not held	
1989	April 16	(Japan) Hiro Matsushita
1990	April 21	(United States) Mark Dismore
1991	April 14	(United States) Jimmy Vasser
1992	April 10	(United States) Mark Dismore
1993	April 17	(Canada) Claude Bourbonnais
1994	April 17	(United States) Richie Hearn
1995	April 17	(Canada) David Empringham
1996	April 13	(United States) Case Montgomery
1997	April 12	(Canada) Alex Tagliani
1998	April 4	(United States) Memo Gidley
1999	April 17	(Canada) Alex Tagliani
2000	April 15	(United States) Buddy Rice
2001	April 8	(Canada) David Rutledge
2002	April 14	(Canada) Michael Valiante
2003	April 13	(United States) A. J. Allmendinger
2004	April 18	(United Kingdom) Ryan Dalziel
2005	April 10	(United Kingdom) Katherine Legge
2006	April 9	(Germany) Andreas Wirth
2007	April 15	(Brazil) Raphael Matos
2008	April 20	(Switzerland) Simona de Silvestro

Indy Lights history
Season	Date	Driver
1989	April 16	(Republic of Ireland) Tommy Byrne
1990	April 22	(Canada) Paul Tracy
1991	April 14	(Belgium) Éric Bachelart
1992	April 12	(France) Franck Fréon
1993	April 18	(United Kingdom) Steve Robertson
1994	April 17	(United Kingdom) Steve Robertson
1995	April 9	(Canada) Greg Moore
1996	April 14	(Canada) David Empringham
1997	April 13	(Brazil) Hélio Castroneves
1998	April 5	(Brazil) Cristiano da Matta
1999	April 18	(Austria) Philipp Peter
2000	April 16	(New Zealand) Scott Dixon
2001	April 8	(United States) Townsend Bell
2002 – 2008	Not held	
2009	April 19	(United States) J. R. Hildebrand
2010	April 18	(Canada) James Hinchcliffe
2011	April 17	(United States) Conor Daly
2012	April 15	(Argentina) Esteban Guerrieri
2013	April 20	(Colombia) Carlos Muñoz
2014	April 13	(Colombia) Gabby Chaves
2015	April 19	(United Arab Emirates) Ed Jones

==== IMSA GTO/GTU ====
Year	GTO	GTU	Report
1990	**(United States) Dorsey Schroeder**; **Mercury Cougar**	(United States) John Finger; Mazda MX-6	Report
1991	**(New Zealand) Steve Millen**; **Nissan 300ZX**	(United States) John Fergus; Dodge Daytona	Report

==== Rolex Sports Car Series ====
Rolex Sports Car Series
Year	Drivers	Car	Report
2006	(United States) Scott Pruett (Mexico) Luis Díaz	Riley Mk XX–Lexus	Report

==== American Le Mans Series ====
Year	LMP1	LMP2		GT1	GT2	Report
2007	(Italy) Rinaldo Capello (United Kingdom) Allan McNish; Audi R10 TDI	**(France) Romain Dumas** **(Germany) Timo Bernhard**; **Porsche RS Spyder**		(United Kingdom) Oliver Gavin (Monaco) Olivier Beretta; Chevrolet Corvette C6.R	(Finland) Mika Salo (Brazil) Jaime Melo; Ferrari F430 GT2	Report
2008	**(Germany) Marco Werner** **(Germany) Lucas Luhr**; **Audi R10 TDI**	(United States) Scott Sharp (Australia) David Brabham; Acura ARX-01b		(United States) Johnny O'Connell (Denmark) Jan Magnussen; Chevrolet Corvette C6.R	(Germany) Dominik Farnbacher (Germany) Dirk Müller; Ferrari F430 GT2	Report
2009	**(Brazil) Gil de Ferran** **(France) Simon Pagenaud**; **Acura ARX-02a**	(Mexico) Adrián Fernández (Mexico) Luis Díaz; Acura ARX-01b		(United Kingdom) Oliver Gavin (Monaco) Olivier Beretta; Chevrolet Corvette C6.R	(United States) Patrick Long (Germany) Jörg Bergmeister; Porsche 911 GT3-RSR	Report
	LMP		LMPC	GT	GTC	
2010	**(Australia) David Brabham** **(France) Simon Pagenaud**; **HPD ARX-01c**		(United States) Elton Julian (United States) Gunnar Jeannette; Oreca FLM09/Chevrolet	(United States) Patrick Long (Germany) Jörg Bergmeister; Porsche 911 GT3-RSR	(Mexico) Juan González (United States) Butch Leitzinger; Porsche 997 GT3 Cup	Report
	LMP1	LMP2	LMPC	GT	GTC	
2011	**(Germany) Klaus Graf** **(Germany) Lucas Luhr**; **Lola-Aston Martin B09/60**	(United States) Scott Tucker (France) Christophe Bouchut; HPD ARX-03b	(United States) Gunnar Jeannette (Mexico) Ricardo González; Oreca FLM09/Chevrolet	(Germany) Dirk Müller (United States) Joey Hand; BMW M3 GT2	(United States) Tim Pappas (Netherlands) Jeroen Bleekemolen; Porsche 997 GT3 Cup	Report
2012	**(Germany) Klaus Graf** **(Germany) Lucas Luhr**; **HPD ARX-03a**	(United States) Scott Tucker (France) Christophe Bouchut; HPD ARX-03b	(Venezuela) Alex Popow (United Kingdom) Ryan Dalziel; Oreca FLM09/Chevrolet	(United Kingdom) Oliver Gavin (United States) Tommy Milner; Chevrolet Corvette C6.R	(United States) Peter LeSaffre (Republic of Ireland) Damien Faulkner; Porsche 997 GT3 Cup	Report
2013	**(Germany) Klaus Graf** **(Germany) Lucas Luhr**; **HPD ARX-03a**	(United States) Scott Sharp (United States) Guy Cosmo; HPD ARX-03b	(United States) Jon Bennett (United States) Colin Braun; Oreca FLM09/Chevrolet	(United States) Bill Auberlen (Belgium) Maxime Martin; BMW Z4 GTE	(United Kingdom) Sean Edwards (United States) Henrique Cisneros; Porsche 997 GT3 Cup	Report

==== IMSA WeatherTech SportsCar Championship ====
Year	Prototype	Prototype Challenge	GT Le Mans	GT Daytona	Report
2014	**(United States) Scott Pruett** **(Mexico) Memo Rojas**; **Riley MkXXVI/Ford**	did not participate	(Spain) Antonio García (Denmark) Jan Magnussen; Chevrolet Corvette C7.R	did not participate	Report
2015	**(United States) Ricky Taylor** **(United States) Jordan Taylor**; **Corvette DP/Chevrolet**	did not participate	(Germany) Dirk Werner (United States) Bill Auberlen; BMW Z4 GTE	did not participate	Report
2016	**(United States) Ricky Taylor** **(United States) Jordan Taylor**; **Corvette DP/Chevrolet**	(Canada) Misha Goikhberg (South Africa) Stephen Simpson; Oreca FLM09/Chevrolet	(France) Patrick Pilet (United Kingdom) Nick Tandy; Porsche 911 RSR	did not participate	Report
2017	**(United States) Ricky Taylor** **(United States) Jordan Taylor**; **Cadillac DPi-V.R**	(United Kingdom) Oliver Gavin (United States) Tommy Milner; Chevrolet Corvette C7.R	(United States) Gunnar Jeannette (United States) Cooper MacNeil; Mercedes-AMG GT3	did not participate	Report
Year	Prototype		GT Le Mans	GT Daytona	Report
2018	**(Portugal) João Barbosa** **(Portugal) Filipe Albuquerque**; **Cadillac DPi-V.R**		(United Kingdom) Oliver Gavin (United States) Tommy Milner; Chevrolet Corvette C7.R	did not participate	Report
Year	Daytona Prototype international		GT Le Mans	GT Daytona	Report
2019	**(Portugal) Filipe Albuquerque** **(Portugal) João Barbosa**; **Cadillac DPi-V.R**		(New Zealand) Earl Bamber (Belgium) Laurens Vanthoor; Porsche 911 RSR	did not participate	Report
2020	Canceled due to the COVID-19 pandemic				
2021	**(Brazil) Pipo Derani** **(Brazil) Felipe Nasr**; **Cadillac DPi-V.R**		(United States) Tommy Milner (United Kingdom) Nick Tandy; Chevrolet Corvette C8.R	(United States) Bryan Sellers (United States) Madison Snow; Lamborghini Huracán GT3 Evo	Report
Year	Daytona Prototype international		GT Daytona Pro	GT Daytona	Report
2022	**(France) Sébastien Bourdais** **(Netherlands) Renger van der Zande**; **Cadillac DPi-V.R**		(United Kingdom) Ross Gunn (Spain) Alex Riberas; Aston Martin Vantage AMR GT3	(United States) Bryan Sellers (United States) Madison Snow; BMW M4 GT3	Report
Year	Grand Touring Prototype		GT Daytona Pro	GT Daytona	Report
2023	**(France) Mathieu Jaminet** **(United Kingdom) Nick Tandy**; **Porsche 963**		(United Kingdom) Ben Barnicoat (United Kingdom) Jack Hawksworth; Lexus RC F GT3	(United States) Bryan Sellers (United States) Madison Snow; BMW M4 GT3	Report
2024	**(France) Sébastien Bourdais** **(Netherlands) Renger van der Zande**; **Cadillac V-Series.R**		did not participate	(United Kingdom) Ben Barnicoat (Canada) Parker Thompson; Lexus RC F GT3	Report
2025	**(Brazil) Felipe Nasr** **(United Kingdom) Nick Tandy**; **Porsche 963**		did not participate	(United Kingdom) Jonny Edgar (Belgium) Laurens Vanthoor; Porsche 911 GT3 R (992)	Report
2026	**(United Kingdom) Nick Yelloly** **(Netherlands) Renger van der Zande**; **Acura ARX-06 LMDh**		did not participate	(United States) Aaron Telitz (Denmark) Benjamin Pedersen	Report

- Overall winners in **bold**

==== Stadium Super Trucks ====
Year	Date	Driver	Ref
2013	April 21	(United States) Justin Lofton	
2014	April 13	(United States) Robby Gordon	
2015	April 19	(Venezuela) E. J. Viso	
2016	April 16	(United States) Sheldon Creed	
2016	April 17	(United States) Sheldon Creed	
2017	April 8	(Australia) Matthew Brabham	
2017	April 9	(United States) Robby Gordon	
2018	April 14	(United States) Gavin Harlien	
2018	April 15	(Australia) Matthew Brabham	
2019	April 13	(Australia) Matthew Brabham	
2019	April 14	(United States) Robby Gordon	
2020	Canceled due to the coronavirus (COVID-19) pandemic		
2021	September 25	(United States) Jerett Brooks	
2021	September 26	(United States) Robby Gordon	
2022	April 9	(United States) Max Gordon	
2022	April 10	(United States) Robby Gordon	
2023	April 15	(Australia) Matthew Brabham	
2023	April 16	(Australia) Matthew Brabham	
2024	April 20	(United States) Max Gordon	
2024	April 21	(United States) Myles Cheek	
2025	April 12	(United States) Max Gordon	
2025	April 13	(United States) Myles Cheek	
2026	April 18	(United States) Max Gordon	
2026	April 19	(Australia) Matthew Brabham	

== Race summaries ==
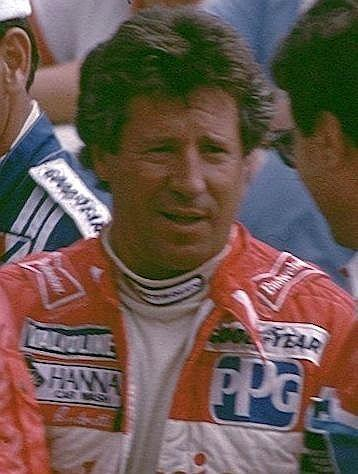
Mario Andretti won the Long Beach Grand Prix four times (1977, 1984, 1985, 1987).

=== CART PPG Indy Car World Series ===
- 1984: After eight years, the Long Beach Grand Prix changed to a CART series race. The race served as the 1984 season opener. Mario Andretti, who won the 1977 race, won the pole position, took the lead at the start and led all 112 laps en route to a dominating victory. The only other driver to finish the race on the lead lap was Geoff Brabham, who finished second on only seven cylinders. Two-time World Champion Emerson Fittipaldi made his CART debut with a 4th-place finish.
- 1985: Mario Andretti started on the pole position, and led the first 58 laps. Andretti's strategy was to try to complete the race on one pit stop. After building up an over 10-second lead, Andretti pitted on lap 44. In order to conserve fuel, however, he subsequently dialed back his turbocharger boost. Danny Sullivan had pitted on lap 37. With Andretti slowing his pace, Sullivan went on a charge, dicing through traffic and caught up to Andretti. On the back stretch on lap 59, Sullivan took the lead and began pulling out to a 15-second advantage. It was expected that the race would be decided between Sullivan and Andretti, with Sullivan needing one final pit stop, and Andretti gambling on going the distance. The Penske Team was planning a timed pit stop for Sullivan, hoping to fuel the car, and get back out on the track in close proximity to Andretti. On lap 79, Sullivan shockingly ran out of fuel coming out of the hairpin, and he coasted into the pits barely under power. Sullivan lost many seconds, allowing Andretti to re-take the lead. Andretti led the rest of the way and won at Long Beach for the second year in a row, and third time overall. Sullivan ran out of fuel again on the last lap, and wound up third.
- 1986: Michael Andretti scored the first win of his CART career, battling Al Unser Jr. to the finish over a frantic final 25 laps. Michael Andretti made his final pit stop on lap 56, while Al Unser Jr. pitted on lap 69. Unser came out of the pits just ahead of Andretti, but on cold tires, had difficulties holding off the challenge. Down the back stretch on lap 70, Andretti got by and re-assumed the lead. Unser stayed in close contact with Andretti, and on lap 80 when Andretti came upon the lapped car of Roberto Moreno, Unser closed dramatically. Andretti tried to lap Moreno at the end of the back stretch (turn 11), but the two cars nearly clipped wheels and Andretti locked up the brakes. Unser dove below both cars and went side by side with Andretti going into turn 12. Andretti barely held off Unser going into the hairpin. The cars battled nearly nose-to-tail to the finish, with Andretti winning the race by 0.380 seconds.
- 1987: Mario Andretti started on the pole position and led all 95 laps, en route to his third CART win at Long Beach, and fourth win overall. Andretti's victory marked the first-ever Indy car win for the Ilmor–Chevy Indy V-8 engine. Mario Andretti's only serious challenge was from Emerson Fittipaldi. The drivers pulled away from the field and dominated the first half. Fittipaldi, however, suffered from a broken wastegate, and eventually dropped out with a burned piston on lap 52. Andretti cruised the rest of the way, lapping the field. For the third year in a row, Bobby Rahal dropped out early after contact with the concrete wall.

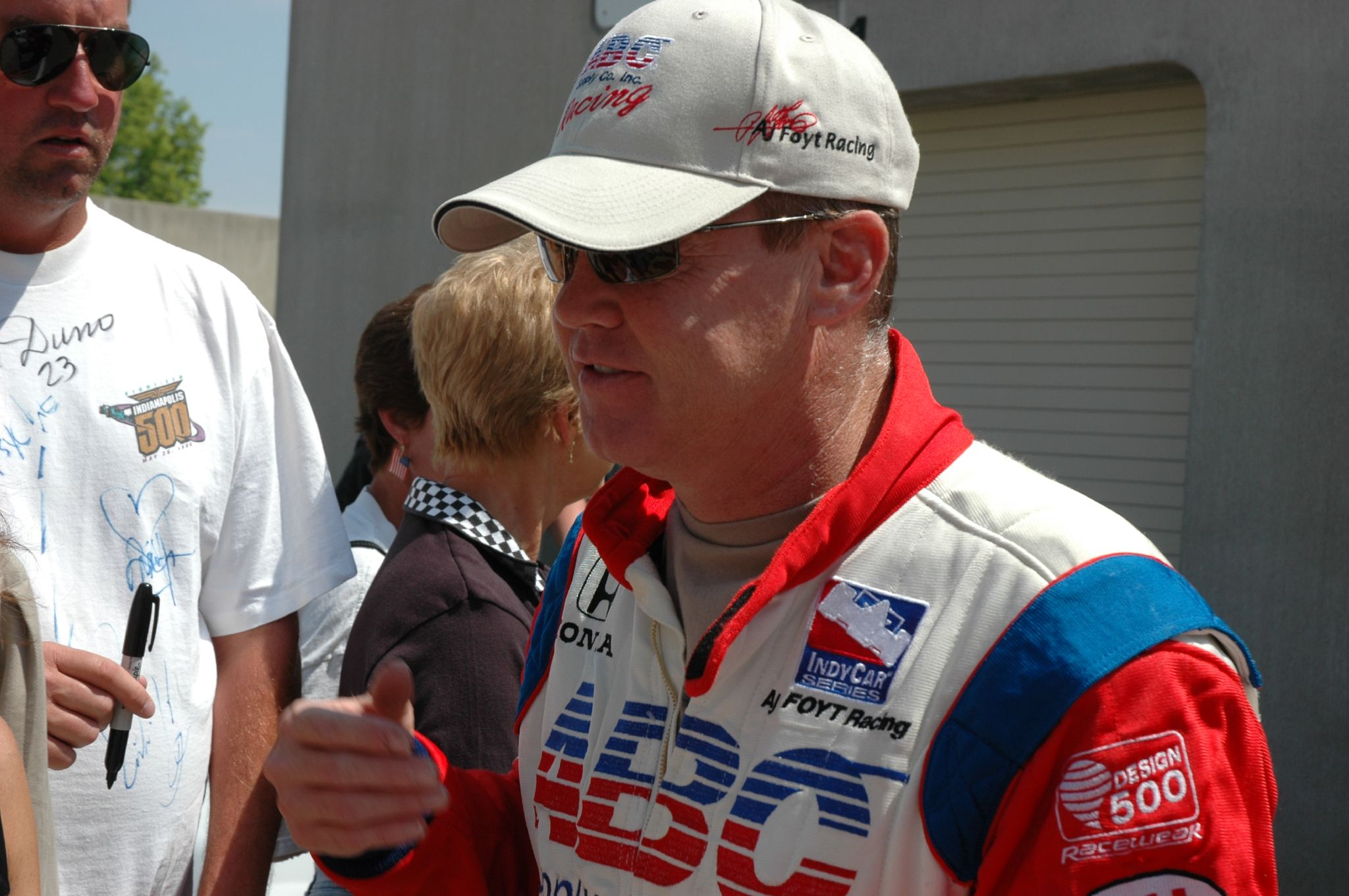
Al Unser Jr. won the Long Beach Grand Prix a record six times, including four in a row in 1988–1991, earning the nickname the "King of the Beach".

- 1988: Al Unser Jr. snapped the Andretti family winning streak at Long Beach, winning the race for the first time, in dominating fashion. Unser Jr. started fourth, but at the start, settled into second behind Mario Andretti. Going into the hairpin at the end of the first lap, Unser dove below Andretti and took the lead. On his first pit stop, Unser suffered a cross-threaded lug nut, and dropped to sixth, putting Danny Sullivan into the lead. Unser charged, however, gaining nearly a second per lap, re-taking the lead for good on lap 42. Unser led 72 of the 95 laps, lapping the entire field, and when Sullivan dropped out on lap 82, was all alone to the finish. Bobby Rahal finished second, his best career Long Beach result, driving the Judd AV engine.
- 1989: Al Unser Jr. led 72 of the first 74 laps, but late in the race, Unser found himself in a battle with Mario and Michael Andretti. All three drivers made their final pit stops, and after a faster pit stop, Mario Andretti emerged as the leader on lap 78, with Unser second, and Michael now a distant third. Unser was close behind Mario when they approached the lapped car of Tom Sneva. At the exit of turn two, and going into turn three, Unser dove under Mario Andretti for the lead, but punted Mario's right-rear wheel. Andretti was sent spinning out with a flat tire and broken suspension, while Unser broke part of his front wing, and bent his steering. Despite the damage, Unser nursed the crippled car to the finish line, winning by 12.377 seconds over Michael Andretti. The contact was controversial, and after the race, Mario called the move "stupid driving." Unser accepted blame for the contact.
- 1990: Al Unser Jr. led 91 of 95 laps, but late in the race, had to hold off the challenge of Penske teammates Emerson Fittipaldi and Danny Sullivan for the victory. On lap 2, Fittipaldi and Sullivan banged wheels, causing Sullivan to spin and collect Michael Andretti. Both Sullivan and Andretti recovered and charged up through the field as the race went progressed. With Unser Jr. holding a 10-second lead, a caution came out on lap 66 which bunched the field and erased Unser's advantage. All of the leaders pitted, and when the green flag came back out on lap 70, Fittipaldi was able to close up behind Unser. Fittipaldi got within two car lengths, but Unser held on for the victory. After the early altercation, Danny Sullivan and Michael Andretti finished 3rd and 4th. It was Al Unser Jr.'s third consecutive win at Long Beach.
- 1991: Al Unser Jr. set an event record and tied a CART series record, by winning the Long Beach Grand Prix for the fourth year in a row. The race, however, is best-remembered for a frightening pit road collision between Michael Andretti and Emerson Fittipaldi. Michael Andretti started on the pole and led the first lap, but Al Unser Jr. took the lead on lap 2. Unser stretched his lead to as large as 16 seconds, while Andretti ran second much of the afternoon. On lap 70, Unser and Andretti made their final pit stops. Unser returned to the track with the lead. While Andretti was exiting the pit lane, Emerson Fittipaldi came out of his pit stall in the path of Andretti. The two cars touched wheels, Andretti's car flew up on its side, then came to rest on top of Fittipaldi's sidepod. The two cars were too damaged to return, but neither driver was injured. After the pit road mishap, Unser cruised to victory, with his Galles/KRACO Racing teammate Bobby Rahal coming home second.

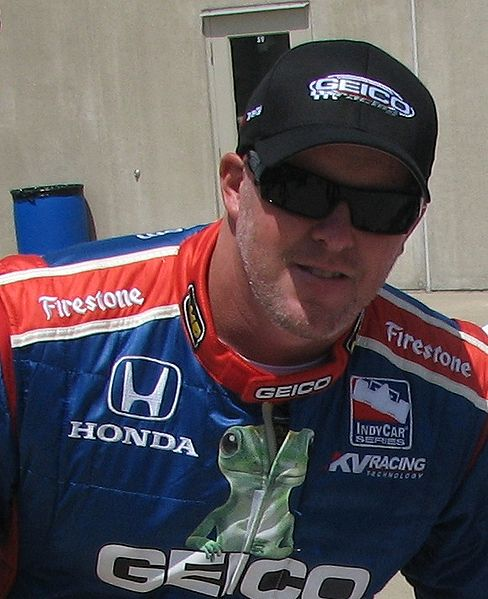
Paul Tracy's first Indy car victory came at the 1993 Long Beach Grand Prix.

- 1992: Going for an unprecedented fifth win in a row at Long Beach, Al Unser Jr. lead 54 laps, and was leading with less than four laps to go. His Galles/KRACO Racing teammate Danny Sullivan was right behind in second, challenging for the lead in the closing laps. Bobby Rahal and Emerson Fittipaldi were also nose-to-tail with the leaders. Going down the back stretch on lap 102, Sullivan dove low to make the pass, but Unser closed the door. The two cars tangled, and Unser was sent spinning out into a tire barrier. Sullivan took the lead, and staved off Rahal and Fittpaldi to the finish line. It was the first ever win for the Galmer chassis, and Sullivan's first Indy car win since 1990. Unser Jr. recovered from the spin, and finished in 4th place. The race started out on the first lap with a collision between Mario Andretti and Eddie Cheever, which started a standing feud between the two.
- 1993: Paul Tracy won his first career Indy car race, battling Nigel Mansell most of the afternoon. Tracy led 81 of the 105 laps, but his day was not without incident. While leading the race on lap 25, he clipped wheels with Danny Sullivan, and was forced to pit with a flat tire. Later on lap 61, he had to make an unscheduled pit stop for a blistered tire. Tracy re-assumed the lead on lap 74 after Mansell made his final pit stop, and when Mansell later lost second gear, Tracy cruised to the finish. Bobby Rahal, running 11th at the halfway point, finished 2nd in the RH chassis, owing much to the fact that Mansell, Scott Goodyear, Mario Andretti, Raul Boesel all suffered contact or mechanical problems late in the race.
- 1994: Al Unser Jr., who had joined Team Penske during the offseason, won his first race driving for his new team, and his record fifth victory at Long Beach. Penske teammates Paul Tracy, Unser, and Emerson Fittipaldi started 1st, 2nd, and 3rd, respectively, and combined to lead all but two laps. Tracy and Fittipaldi led early, but both eventually dropped out with gearbox failures. Tracy spun four times due to the axle-hopping from the gearbox issues, including spinning out while leading the race on lap 20. Unser led 61 laps, and despite a black flag penalty for violating the pit road speed limit, won the race going away. Nigel Mansell finished second, but had lost considerable time when he and Michael Andretti made contact, resulting in a flat tire.
- 1995: Al Unser Jr. started fourth, and charged to the lead by lap 30. Unser dominated most of the rest of the race, and won his sixth Long Beach Grand Prix in the past eight years. Scott Pruett finished second for Patrick Racing, the best finish for Firestone tires since returning to Indy car racing at the beginning of the season. Contenders Bobby Rahal (transmission), Christian Fittipaldi (engine), and Teo Fabi (stop-and-go penalty) all fell from contention in the latter stages of the race.
- 1996: Gil de Ferran won the pole position and dominated the race, leading 100 of the first 101 laps. With four laps to go, however, a turbocharger hose came loose, and de Ferrans's car suddenly began to slow. Jimmy Vasser led the final four laps, holding off Parker Johnstone for the victory.
- 1997: Gil de Ferran and Alex Zanardi started on the front row, and battled much of the afternoon. Though de Ferran appeared to have the faster machine, Zanardi's Ganassi crew executed faster pit stops, which put Zanardi out in front after each sequences of stops. Charging hard to catch Zanardi, de Ferran clipped the wall on lap 93, and fell out with a damaged suspension.

=== CART FedEx Championship Series ===
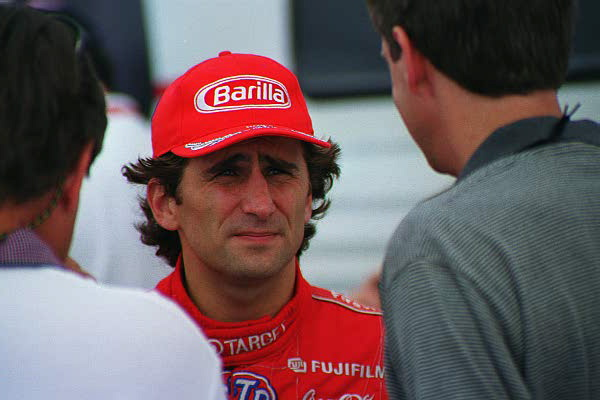
Alex Zanardi won back-to-back races at Long Beach in 1997 and 1998.

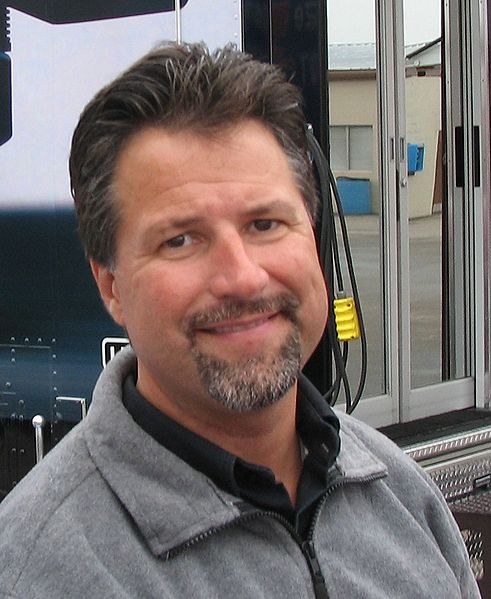
Michael Andretti's first career Indy car victory (1986) and final victory (2002) both came at Long Beach.

- 1998: Alex Zanardi scored an improbable victory, winning at Long Beach for the second year in a row. Zanardi fell a lap down early in the race after a collision resulted in a bent steering arm. The race lead was being contested between Bryan Herta, Gil de Ferran, Dario Franchitti, and Hélio Castroneves. With a race-record seven cautions, Zanardi managed to get back on the lead lap and slowly worked his way up through the field. On lap 72, Zanardi pitted for tires and fuel, while most of the leaders stayed out since they had just pitted on lap 56. In the closing stages, all of the leaders except Zanardi were facing a splash-and-go pit stop for fuel. After the leaders cycled through their stops, Herta and Frachitti emerged 1st-2nd, with Zanardi now in third, and charging hard. With five laps to go, the top three were nose-to-tail, and Zanardi passed for second. Three laps later, he took the lead. Zanardi led only the final two laps to steal the win.
- 1999: Rookie Juan Pablo Montoya won his first-career Champ/Indy car race, in his third career start, giving Chip Ganassi Racing the team's fourth consecutive victory at Long Beach, in front of a record crowd of 102,000. Montoya started the race fifth, and one by one, picked off the top three cars to move into second behind race leader Tony Kanaan. On lap 46, due to the track breaking up, Kanaan lost control and slid off the course and into a tire barrier. The crash handed the lead to Montoya, who led the rest of the way to victory.
- 2000: Paul Tracy started 17th, but steadily climbed to the front of the field, taking the lead on lap 62 to win at Long Beach for the second time. Tracy benefited from strong pit strategy, swift pit work, and an aggressive charge, and managed to put himself in third on lap 58. On a restart with rookie Takuya Kurosawa leading, Roberto Moreno second, and Tracy third, Moreno suddenly slowed with gearbox trouble. Tracy muscled past Kurosawa four laps later, and held off Hélio Castroneves for the victory.
- 2001: Hélio Castroneves started from the pole position and led all 82 lap to victory. Despite leading wire-to-wire, Castroneves did not run away with the race, with Cristiano da Matta and Kenny Bräck in close pursuit most of the day. After Brack dropped out with a broken gearbox on lap 30, the race was a two-man battle between Castroneves and da Matta. Castroneves staved off numerous overtake attempts by da Matta in the second half. The margin of victory was a mere 0.534 seconds, one of the closest finishes in Long Beach history.
- 2002: Michael Andretti won the 2002 Grand Prix of Long Beach, his 42nd and final career Indy/Champ car victory. The win came nearly sixteen years to the day of his first career Indy car win – at the same race – the 1986 Long Beach Grand Prix. Andretti started 15th and gambled by pitting out-of-sequence, as did Max Papis. Andretti assumed the lead on lap 62 when the rest of the leaders cycled through routine green flag pit stops. Andretti and Papis led Jimmy Vasser by over 30 seconds, but both still needed one final pit stop for fuel. A full-course caution came out on lap 63, and both drivers took advantage of the break. Meanwhile, Vasser slowed down to be picked up by the pace car, not realizing he was not the race leader, and actually running third. Vasser slowing down gave Andretti and Papis extra time and allowed them to pit without giving up first and second position. Vasser managed to get by Papis when the green came back out, but Andretti held on for the win.
- 2003: Michel Jourdain Jr. looked poised to win his first-career CART series race, but mechanical problems foiled his chances at victory. Jourdain started on the pole, but Paul Tracy took the lead at the start and led the first 26 laps. After pit stops, Jourdain assumed the lead on lap 27, and mostly dominated the race over the next 49 laps. The race came down to Jourdain and Tracy, with both drivers needing one final pit stop in the final ten laps. Tracy pitted with 8 laps to go, and came back out on the track still in second place, ahead of Adrián Fernández. Jourdain pitted one lap later, but as he was leaving the pits, the car failed to pull away. A faulty clutch dropped him out of the race, and handed the victory to Tracy. It was Tracy's third win at Long Beach, and he became the first driver in CART history to sweep the first three races of the season.

=== Champ Car World Series ===
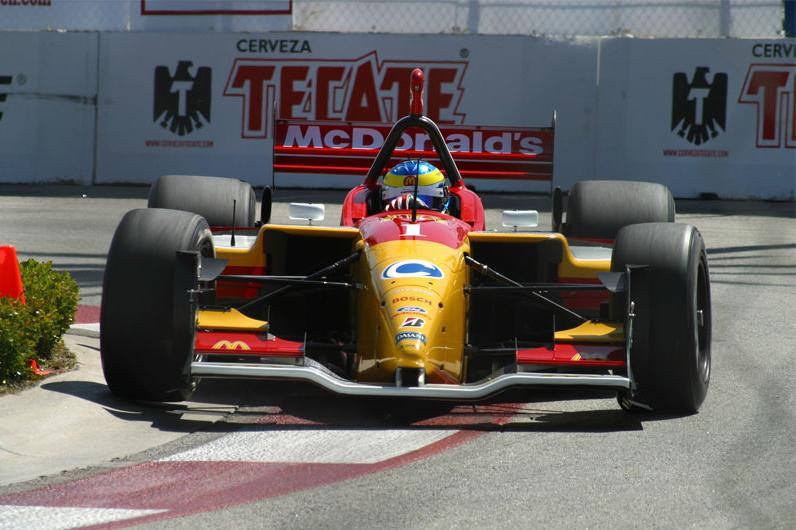
Sébastien Bourdais won three years in a row (2005, 2006, 2007).

- 2004: Paul Tracy won the 30th Long Beach Grand Prix, his fourth victory in the event, and second in a row. At the start, Tracy utilized the new Push-to-pass button to boldly dive from third to first in the first turn. Tracy ran away with the race, giving up the lead only once during a routine pit stop. On lap 2, three cars (Jimmy Vasser, Alex Sperafico, and Tarso Marques) crashed, bringing out the lone caution of the day.
- 2005: Sébastien Bourdais worked his way from fourth starting position to the lead by lap 30. Bourdais pulled out to as much as a 7-second lead, and controlled the race most of the way thereafter. A late caution bunched the field, and second place Paul Tracy was on the optional tires, while Bourdais was on the primary tires. Bourdais got the jump on the restart and went on to win, while Tracy became mired behind a lapped car and finished second. The race was held under a cloud of uncertainty, as it was in its final contract year with CART/Champ Car. Rumors were swirling around the paddock that the event might switch to the Indy Racing League for 2006.
- 2006: After rumors of a possible switch to IRL, the race returned as part of the Champ Car series. Sébastien Bourdais won for the second year in a row, starting from the pole and leading 70 of the 74 laps. He finished 14 seconds ahead of second place Justin Wilson.
- 2007: Sébastien Bourdais led 58 of 78 laps, dominating en route to his third consecutive Long Beach victory. Paul Tracy crashed during practice on Saturday and sat out with a back injury. He was replaced by Oriol Servia. Will Power passed Alex Tagliani on the last lap to finish second.
- 2008: The 2008 Long Beach Grand Prix was the first to take place after the open wheel unification, and it was considered the final race of the Champ Car era. After the IndyCar and Champ Car calendars were hastily merged, an irreconcilable scheduling conflict arose between Long Beach and the Indy Japan 300. A compromise was made such that the former Champ Car teams competed at Long Beach, while established IndyCar Series teams competed at Motegi. Both races would pay full points to the IndyCar championship, and while Long Beach technically now fell under the sanctioning umbrella of IndyCar, it was run with Champ Car regulations, and was heralded as the "final" Champ Car race. The contingent of former Champ Car teams produced a twenty-car field, all utilizing the turbocharged Cosworth/Panoz DP01 for the final time. From a standing start (the first such at Long Beach since 1983), Will Power got the jump from fourth position to take the lead into turn one. Power led 81 of the 83 laps, relinquishing the top position only during pit stops.

=== IndyCar Series ===
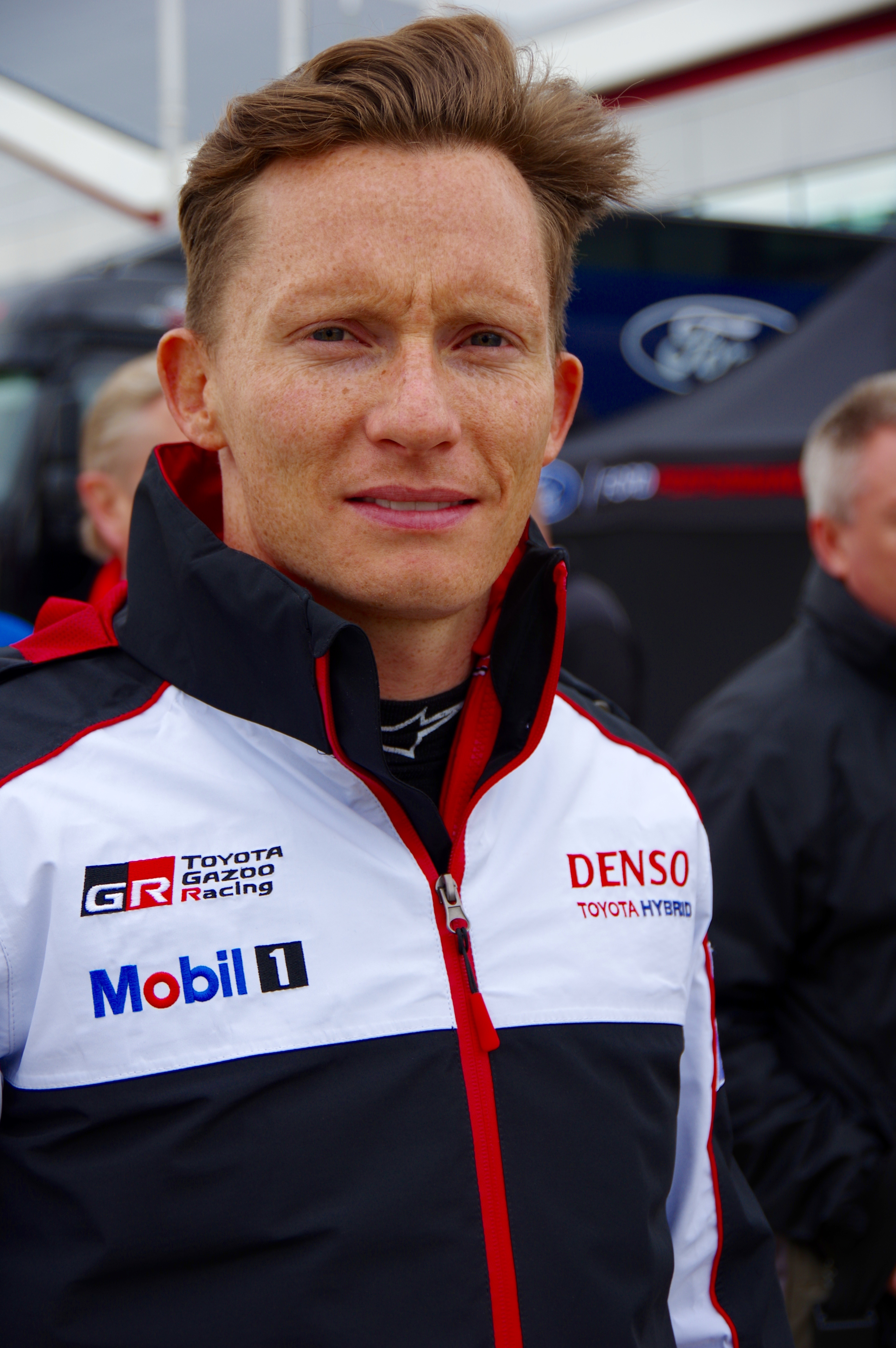
Mike Conway won twice at Long Beach (2011, 2014).

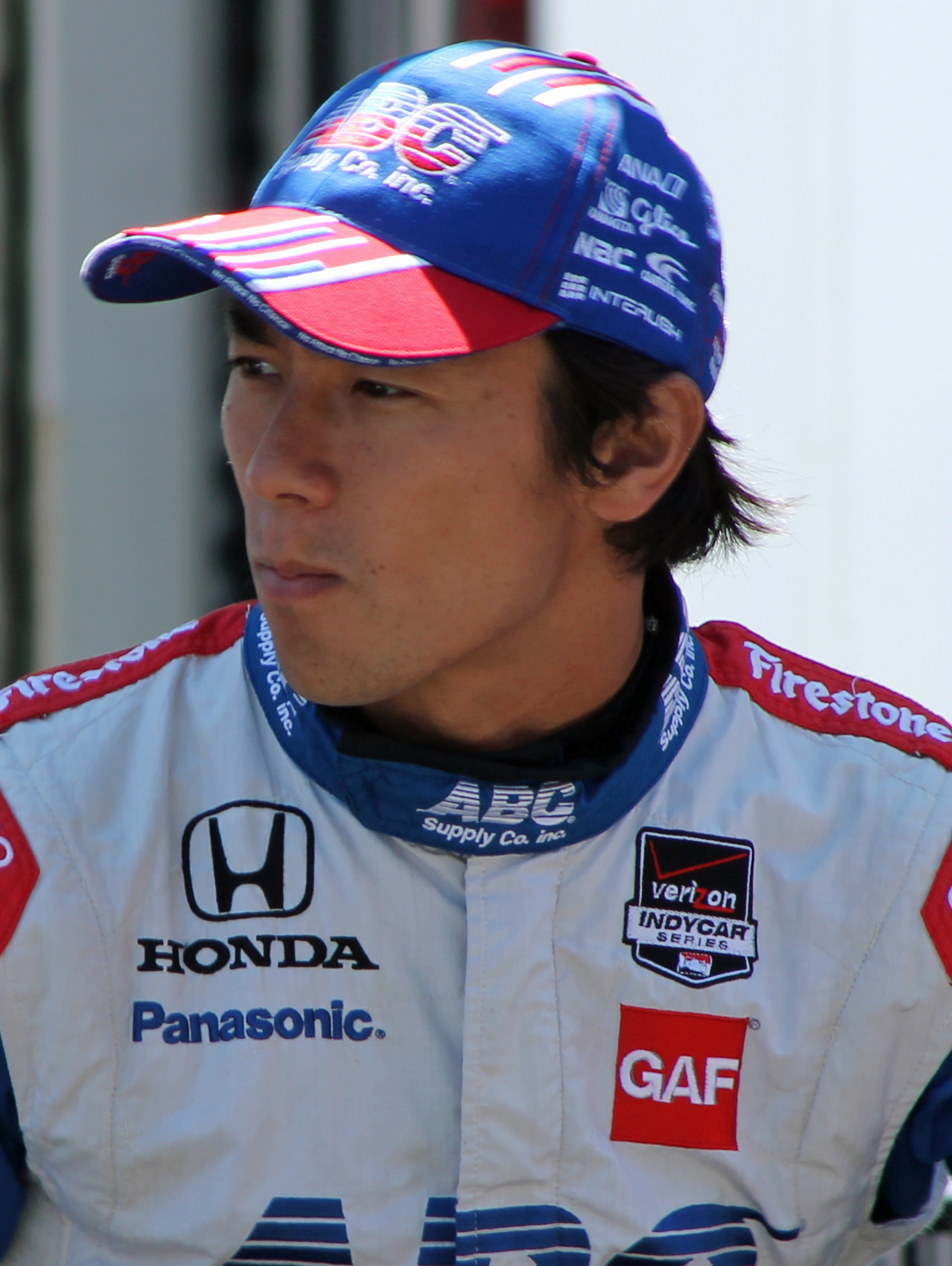
Takuma Sato won his first career Indy car race at Long Beach in 2013.

- 2009: Will Power took the lead from the pole position and led the first 16 laps. Dario Franchitti and Danica Patrick both pitted early on lap 16, and benefited from a full-course caution. Over the next 30 laps, the lead traded between Tony Kanaan, Marco Andretti, and Dario Franchitti. Pitting early once more, Dario Franchitti and Danica Patrick again benefited. Moments later, Mike Conway spun into the tire barrier in turn 8, bringing out the full course caution again. Most of the leaders pitted under the yellow, while Franchitti stayed out to take the lead. Franchitti pulled away and held the lead to the finish, taking the victory. It was his first IndyCar win since 2007, having spent 2008 racing in NASCAR.
- 2010: Will Power started on the pole position, and led the race early. On lap 17, Power errored, when he inadvertently hit the pit road speed limiter button. Ryan Hunter-Reay and Justin Wilson slipped by and Power dropped to third. On a restart on lap 65, Hunter-Reay led, with Power second, and Wilson third. Hunter-Reay had lapped traffic between him and Power and was able to pull out to a comfortable lead. Power, struggling to get through traffic, was passed by Wilson for second. Wilson was not able to close the gap, and Hunter-Reay drove on to victory.
- 2011: With less than 20 laps to go, Mike Conway charged into third place on a restart. He quickly powered past Dario Franchitti and Will Power to take the lead. Conway pulled out to a six-second advantage, and led the final 14 laps en route to his first Indy car victory.
- 2012: Just days prior to the race, Chevrolet announced that all eleven of their entries would change engines, in violation of IndyCar's mileage requirement rule. As a penalty, all of the Chevrolet entries would incur a 10-position grid penalty after time trials. At the start, Dario Franchitti and rookie Josef Newgarden battled into turn one. Newgarden tried to take the lead on the outside, but the two cars clipped slightly, and Newgarden smacked the tire barrier and crashed out of the race. Franchitti took the lead for the first four laps, but quickly faded with handling problems. The race became a contest between rookie Simon Pagenaud and Will Power, with Takuma Sato also strong all afternoon. Power made his final pit stop on lap 64, and attempted to stretch his fuel over the final 21 laps. Pagenaud pitted on lap 70, and seemingly had plenty of fuel to charge to the finish. As Power held the lead, Pagenaud dramatically charged to catch Power, gaining 1–2 seconds per lap. The cars were nose-to-tail in the hairpin as they approached the white flag. Power held off on the final lap to win by 0.8 seconds. Despite the grid penalties, Chevrolet-powered cars swept eight of the top ten finishing positions.
- 2013: Takuma Sato led 50 of 80 laps, and won his first career IndyCar race. Sato effectively took control of the race on lap 23, when he passed Ryan Hunter-Reay for second place in turn 1. After the leaders cycled through pit stops, Sato assumed the lead on lap 31, and did not relinquish the top spot for the remainder of the race. Sato's win was the first for A. J. Foyt Enterprises since 2002.
- 2014: On lap 56, a controversial crash took out six cars, including the drivers running 1st–2nd–3rd. During a sequence of green flag pit stops, Josef Newgarden inherited the lead. Ryan Hunter-Reay, James Hinchcliffe, and Will Power were running nose-to-tail in 2nd–3rd–4th. Newgarden completed his pit stop, and came out on the track just ahead of Hunter-Reay, momentarily holding on to the lead. Going into turn 4, Hunter-Reay attempted a risky pass for the lead, and he made contact with Newgarden, sending both cars into the wall. Hinchcliffe was collected, as was three other cars in the huge melee that nearly blocked the track. Late in the race, Scott Dixon led, followed by Mike Conway and Power close behind. Dixon ran out of fuel, and had to pit with two laps to go. Conway held off Power and Carlos Muñoz to win for the second time at Long Beach.
- 2015: During the first sequence of green flag pit stops on lap 29, leader Hélio Castroneves was briefly held in his pit box to avoid collision with Tony Kanaan, who was entering the stall just ahead. The delay cost Castroneves valuable track position, and allowed Scott Dixon to take over the lead. During the second round of pit stops on lap 55, Dixon was narrowly able to hold the lead, and cruised to victory, his first career win at Long Beach. With Dixon comfortably out in front, and Castroneves in second, the closing laps focused on a furious four-car battle for third place, led by Juan Pablo Montoya and Simon Pagenaud. Fifth place went to Tony Kanaan.
- 2016: Hélio Castroneves led 49 of the first 51 laps. During the second round of stops, Scott Dixon was able to pass Castroneves with quick pit work. However, Simon Pagenaud's pit stop was even faster, and he emerged with the lead of the race. Controversy followed, as Pagenaud placed two tires over the blend line at the exit of pit lane while trying to beat Dixon to turn one. IndyCar officials let Pagenaud off with a warning for the incident, despite protests from Chip Ganassi Racing. Pagenaud held off Dixon by 0.3032 seconds, the closest finish in Long Beach history.
- 2017: James Hinchcliffe won for the first time since his serious crash during practice at the 2015 Indianapolis 500. In the late stages of the race, Andretti Autosport teammates Alexander Rossi, Takuma Sato, and Ryan Hunter-Reay all dropped out with mechanical problems, leaving Hinchcliffe to battle Sébastien Bourdais and Josef Newgarden to the finish. On a restart with three laps to go, Hinchcliffe got the jump and held on for the victory.
- 2021: The new Roger Penske-led IndyCar Series returned to Long Beach in 2021 after the 2020 event was canceled due to the COVID-19 pandemic. The race was moved from the traditional early season slot in April to the season finale on September 26 due to the ongoing pandemic, effectively ending the season with a three race west coast swing. The race was a championship-deciding showdown between three drivers; Alex Palou of Chip Ganassi Racing, Pato O'Ward of Arrow McLaren SP, and Josef Newgarden of Team Penske. Palou held a 35-point advantage over his rivals, meaning he only had to finish no worse than 11th to win the championship. O'Ward and Newgarden both had to qualify on the pole to earn the awarded bonus point and win the race to put themselves in a position to win the championship. If he met those prerequisites, O'Ward needed Palou to finish no better than thirteenth to win the championship. Newgarden needed to meet those prerequisites and for Palou to finish no better than twentieth and O'Ward to finish no better than third to win the championship. Qualifying for the race was highly controversial due to a yellow flag caused by Will Power that prevented both Palou and O'Ward from advancing into the Firestone Fast Six while Newgarden advanced. Newgarden won his season-leading fourth pole position and first ever at Long Beach while Palou qualified tenth and O'Ward eighth. Further controversy erupted in a first lap pile up when Ed Jones ran into the back of O'Ward and broke a driveshaft on O'Ward's car. The incident knocked O'Ward out of the race and the championship battle. Meanwhile Colton Herta mounted a furious charge to the front of the field from fourteenth and overtook Scott Dixon and Newgarden for the lead on lap 31 en route to his third win of the season. Palou drove a conservative race into fourth place to secure his first IndyCar championship. Newgarden and Dixon finished second and third respectively.
- 2022: Long Beach returned to its traditional early season slot for 2022. Colton Herta took pole position and led the early stint of the race before Josef Newgarden and Alex Palou overcut Herta in the first series of pitstops. Herta would attempt to attack both Newgarden and Palou before he crashed into the walls near Turn 9. Newgarden then overcut Palou in the next pitstop sequence for the race lead. Herta's teammate and former Haas F1 driver Romain Grosjean managed to pass Palou after the last round of pitstops and began to cut into Newgarden's lead late in the race by virtue of running on a brand new set of alternate tires while Newgarden ran on used primary tires. Newgarden and Grosjean heavily leaned into their push to pass quota, with both using all of their extra horsepower heading into the final ten laps. A late yellow caused by Jimmie Johnson and David Malukas bunched the field together before Newgarden and Grosjean pulled away again for what appeared to be a near photo finish. The race ultimately ended under caution when Takuma Sato made contact with a wall on the last lap. Newgarden claimed his second victory in a row, helping Team Penske win the first three events of the season. Grosjean meanwhile finished second to earn his first podium with Andretti Autosport. Alex Palou rounded out the podium.
- 2023: Kyle Kirkwood qualified on pole, his first IndyCar pole position. Kirkwood led the initial sequence of the race before a yellow caused by contact between Pato O'Ward and Scott Dixon on lap 20 shuffled the field, with most of the field pitting under caution. 2022 race winner Josef Newgarden took the lead from Kirkwood on Lap 26 and held it through the middle stint of the race. Newgarden and Romain Grosjean made their last pitstop with 32 laps to go, while Kirkwood and strategist Bryan Herta elected to remain out for one lap longer. The overcut sequence worked, Kirkwood overtook both Newgarden and Grosjean for the race lead, and held onto it for his first IndyCar win. Newgarden faded from the front of the field due to fuel saving, leading Romain Grosjean and reigning Indianapolis 500 winner Marcus Ericsson to finish second and third respectively.
- 2024: Felix Rosenqvist qualified on pole, earning the first pole position ever for Meyer Shank Racing in IndyCar. Rosenqvist lost the lead on the opening lap early to Will Power. The first yellow of the day came on Lap 15 by Christian Rasmussen, and Power was forced to pit and relinquish the lead to Josef Newgarden. Newgarden later surrendered the lead under a green flag pit stop around lap 31 to Colton Herta. Herta lost the lead at lap 62 to Scott Dixon, who was running a tight fuel saving strategy. Newgarden heavily pursued Dixon in the closing laps, but was rear ended by Colton Herta and stalled with nine laps to go. This let Herta and Alex Palou by. Herta pursued Dixon heavily, but Dixon conserved enough fuel to use up his significant push to pass advantage to build a gap between himself and Herta to take his second win at Long Beach. Herta finished second and Alex Palou rounded out the podium.
- 2025: The 2025 iteration of the Long Beach Grand Prix was extended from 85 laps to 90 laps. Kyle Kirkwood qualified on pole and led the entire race. Alex Palou attempted numerous undercuts to attempt to gain the advantage on Kirkwood but the Andretti driver held strong. Uniquely for Long Beach, the race ran entirely under a green flag. Palou settled for second while Christian Lundgaard rounded out the podium in third.
- 2026: Felix Rosenqvist started on pole for the second time for Long Beach. After 90 laps, Alex Palou won his first Long Beach Grand Prix while Rosenqvist settled for second and Scott Dixon rounded out the podium in third. Uniquely for the second straight year, the race ran entirely under a green flag.

== See also ==
- Long Beach Motorsports Walk of Fame
- Long Beach Street Circuit

Preceded by Children's of Alabama Indy Grand Prix	IndyCar Series; Grand Prix of Long Beach	Succeeded by Sonsio Grand Prix
