= Long Beach Street Circuit =

Car racing street circuit in California, United States

- Grand Prix Circuit (2000–present)
- Location: Long Beach, California, USA
- Coordinates: 33°45′59″N 118°11′34″W
- FIA Grade: 2
- Opened: 28 September 1975; 51 years ago
- Major events: Current: IndyCar Series; Grand Prix of Long Beach (1984–2019, 2021–present); IMSA SportsCar Championship; Acura Grand Prix of Long Beach (1990–1991, 2006–2019, 2021–present); Stadium Super Trucks (2013–2019, 2021–present); Formula D (2006–2019, 2021–present); Former: Formula E Long Beach ePrix (2015–2016); Formula One; United States Grand Prix West (1976–1983); Pirelli World Challenge (2006–2018); Trans-Am Series (1987–1989, 1992–1993, 1996, 1998–2005); North American Touring Car Championship (1997); SCCA/USAC Formula 5000 Championship (1975)
- Website: https://www.gplb.com/

Grand Prix Circuit (2000–present)
- Length: 1.968 mi (3.167 km)
- Turns: 11
- Race lap record: 1:07.2359 ( (Spain) Álex Palou, Dallara IR-18, 2022, IndyCar)

Formula E Circuit (2015–2016)
- Length: 1.324 mi (2.131 km)
- Turns: 7
- Race lap record: 0:57.938 ( (Switzerland) Sébastien Buemi, Renault Z.E 15, 2016, F-E)

Grand Prix Circuit (1999)
- Length: 1.824 mi (2.935 km)
- Turns: 13
- Race lap record: 1:02.779 ( (Colombia) Juan Pablo Montoya, Reynard 99I, 1999, CART)

Grand Prix Circuit (1992–1998)
- Length: 1.586 mi (2.552 km)
- Turns: 9
- Race lap record: 0:51.333 ( (United States) Bobby Rahal, Reynard 98I, 1998, CART)

Grand Prix Circuit (1984–1991)
- Length: 1.670 mi (2.687 km)
- Turns: 13
- Race lap record: 1:08.5563 ( (United States) Mario Andretti, Lola T900, 1985, CART)

Grand Prix Circuit (1983)
- Length: 2.035 mi (3.275 km)
- Turns: 18
- Race lap record: 1:28.330 ( (Austria) Niki Lauda, McLaren MP41C, 1983, F1)

Grand Prix Circuit (1982)
- Length: 2.130 mi (3.428 km)
- Turns: 14
- Race lap record: 1:30.831 ( (Austria) Niki Lauda, McLaren MP4B, 1982, F1)

Grand Prix Circuit (1975–1981)
- Length: 2.020 mi (3.251 km)
- Turns: 13
- Race lap record: 1:19.830 ( (Brazil) Nelson Piquet, Brabham BT49, 1980, F1)

The Long Beach Street Circuit is a street circuit located in Long Beach, California, United States. It hosts the Grand Prix of Long Beach since 1975, which currently includes the IndyCar Series, IMSA SportsCar Championship and Formula Drift. Previously it hosted races for Formula One, Formula E, Championship Auto Racing Teams, American Le Mans Series, and Rolex Sports Car Series among others.

== History ==
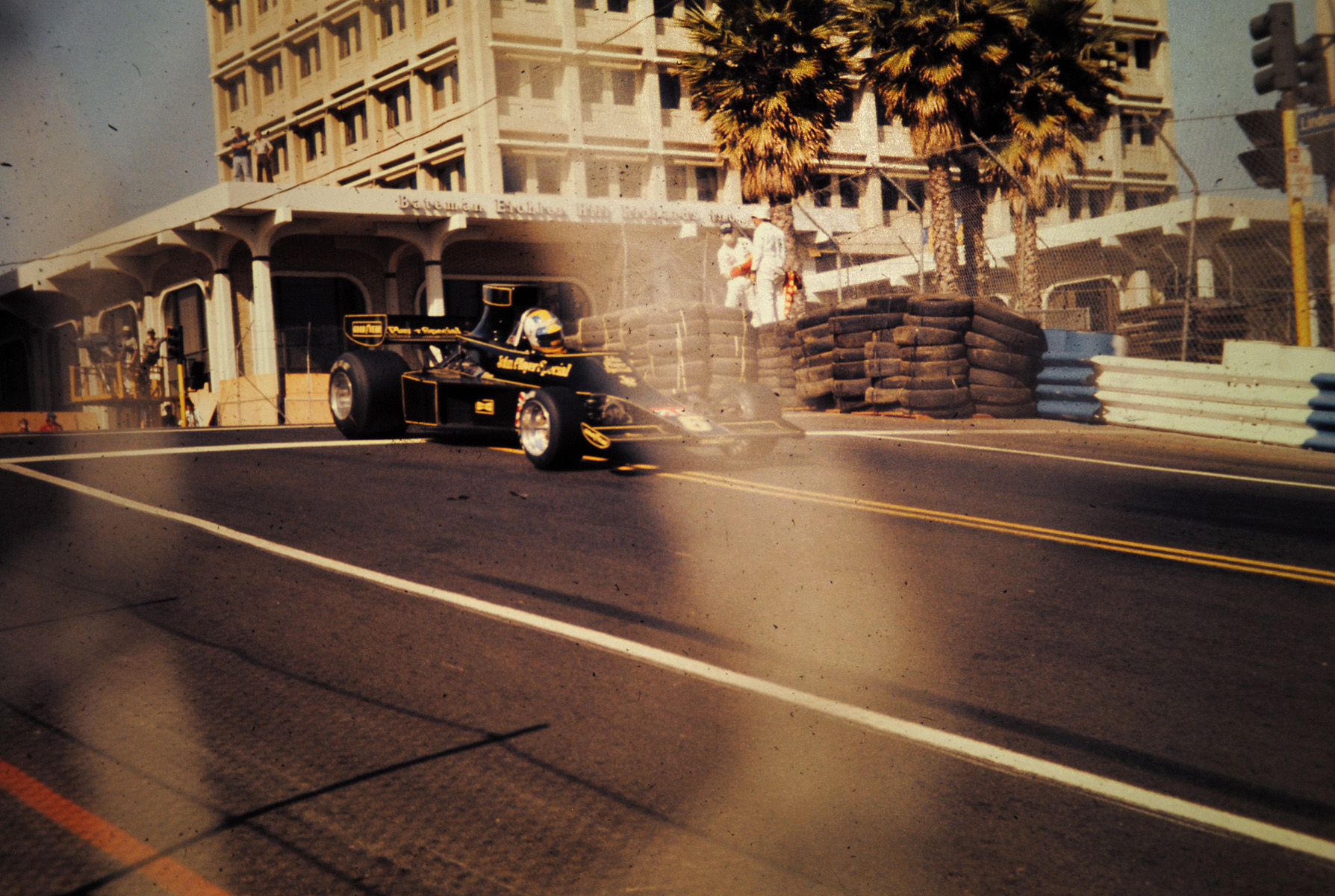
Gunnar Nilsson driving a Lotus 77, 1976 United States Grand Prix West

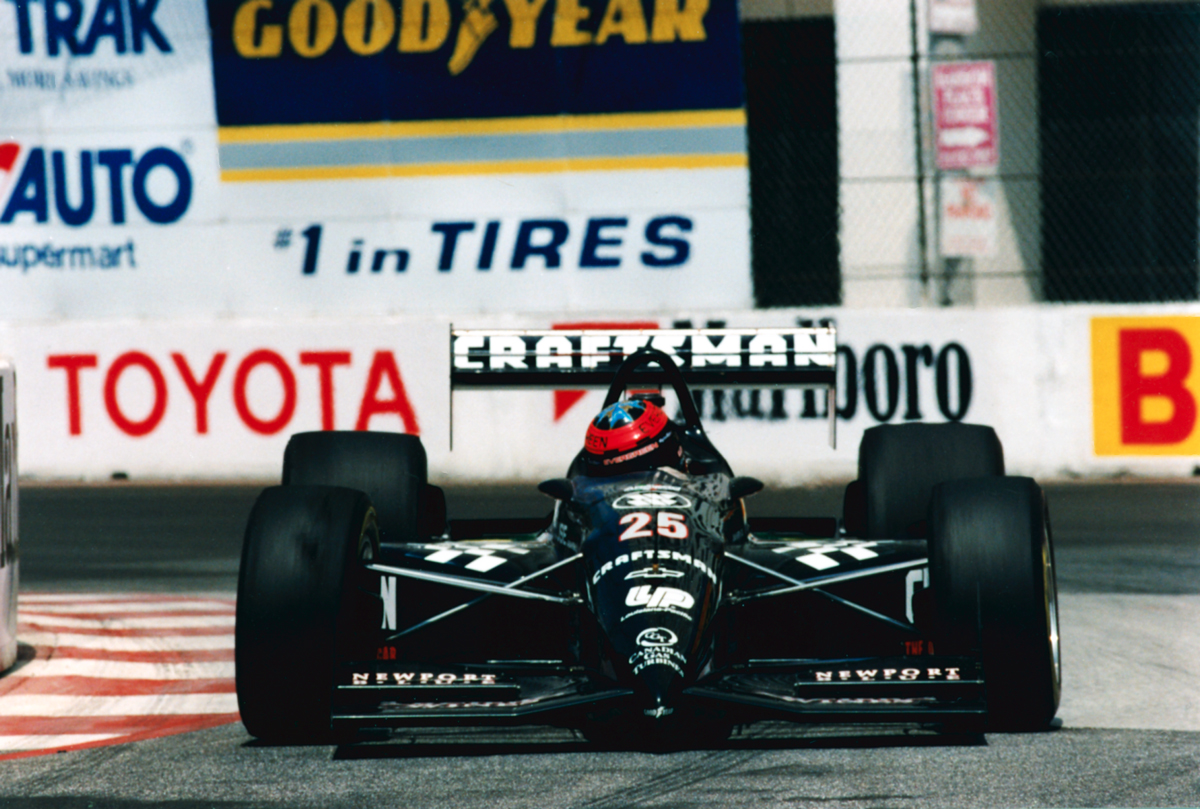
Mark Smith driving in the 1993 race

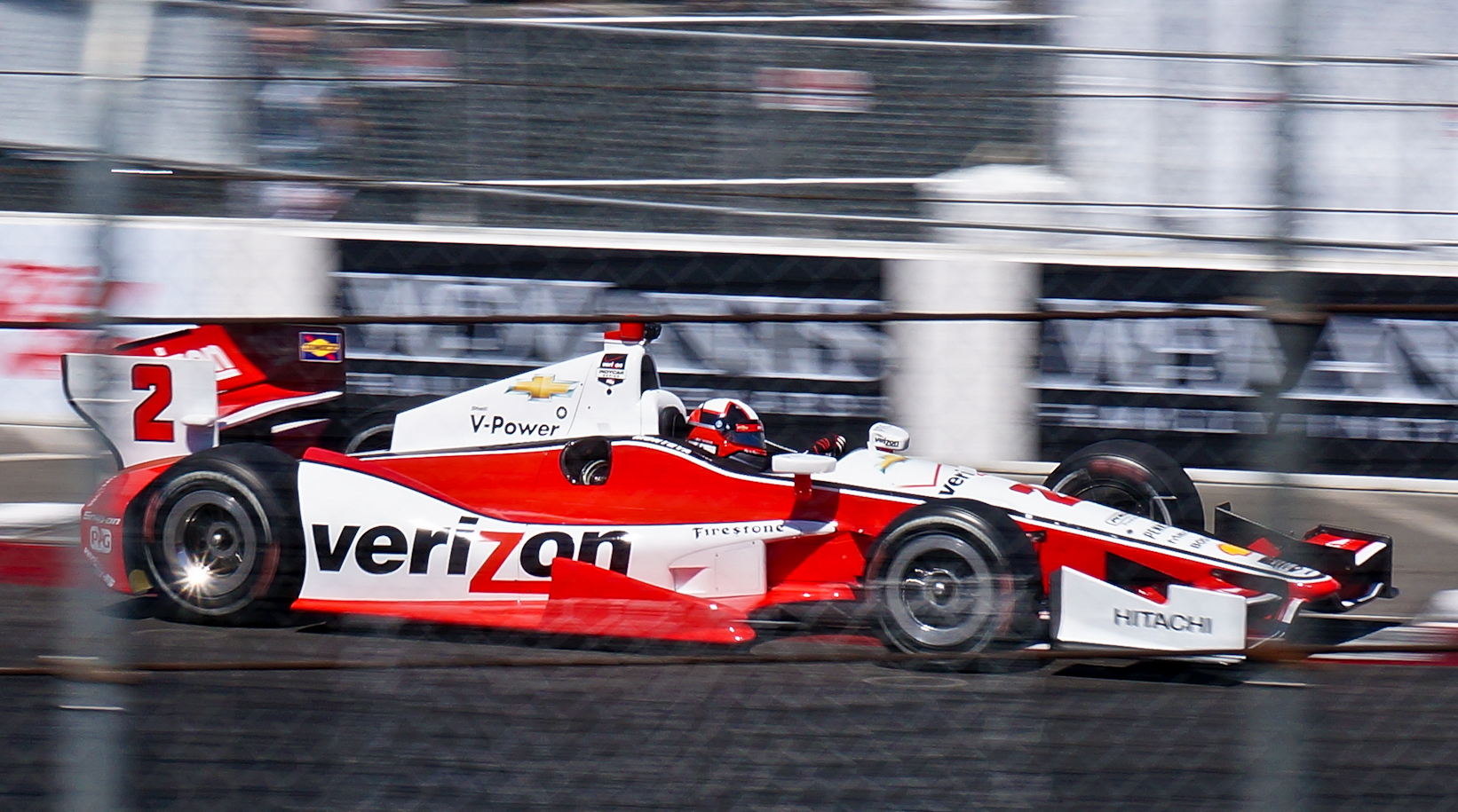
Juan Pablo Montoya driving Dallara DW12 in the 2014 race

The Long Beach Grand Prix was the brainchild of promoter Chris Pook, a former travel agent from England. Pook was inspired by the Monaco Grand Prix, and believed that a similar event had the potential to succeed in the Southern California area. The city of Long Beach was selected, approximately 25 mi (40 km) south of downtown Los Angeles. A waterfront circuit, near the Port of Long Beach was laid out on city streets, and despite the area at the time being mostly a depressed, industrial port city, the first event drew 30,000 fans. The inaugural race was held in September 1975 as part of the Formula 5000 series.

In 1976, the United States Grand Prix West was created, providing two grand prix races annually in the United States for a time. Long Beach became a Formula One event for 1976 and the race was moved to March or April. Meanwhile, the United States Grand Prix East at Watkins Glen International was experiencing a noticeably steady decline. Despite gaining a reputation of being demanding and rough on equipment, Long Beach almost immediately gained prominence owing much to its pleasant weather, picturesque setting, and close proximity to Los Angeles and the glitzy Hollywood area. When Watkins Glen was dropped from the Formula One calendar after 1980, the now-established Long Beach began to assume an even more prominent status.

Despite exciting races and strong attendance, the event was not financially successful as a Formula One event. The promoter was risking a meager $100,000 profit against a $6–7 million budget. Fearing that one poor running could bankrupt the event, Pook convinced city leaders to change the race to a CART Indy car event beginning in 1984. In short time, the event grew to prominence on the Indy car circuit and has been credited with triggering a renaissance in the city of Long Beach. The race was used to market the city, and in the years since the race's inception, many dilapidated and condemned buildings have been replaced with high-rise hotels and tourist attractions.

The event served as a CART/Champ Car race from 1984 to 2008, then became an IndyCar Series race event in 2009. The 2017 race was the 43rd running, and the 34th consecutive as an IndyCar race, one of the longest continuously running events in the history of American open-wheel car racing. On three occasions (1984, 1985 and 1987) the race served as the CART season opener. In seven separate seasons (1986, 1988, 1989, 1990, 1992, 1993 and 1994), it served as the final race before the Indianapolis 500.

Due to the COVID-19 pandemic, the 2020 race was canceled as part of the City of Long Beach's ban on events with estimated attendance of more than 250. The following year, as a preparatory measure for the pandemic's effects on the schedule, the race was moved from its traditional April date to September 26, and served as the season finale. With the rise of the Delta variant there were concerns from IndyCar and the event promoters that the race would have to be canceled for 2021 or run with an attendance cap, but the promoters and the city of Long Beach were able to work out a compromise on safety measures and rapid testing to allow the event to go forward with full capacity.

The Grand Prix returned to its traditional April date for the 2022 season.

On March 28, 2024, it was announced that former ChampCar owner Gerald Forsythe would buy a 50% stake in the Long Beach Grand Prix from the estate of the late Kevin Kalkhoven.

== Circuit ==
The current race circuit is a 1.968 mi (3.167 km) temporary road course laid out in the city streets surrounding the Long Beach Convention Center. The convention center actually doubled as the pit paddock during the days of Formula One. The circuit also goes primarily over the former location of The Pike historic amusement zone. The track is particularly noted for its last section, a sharp hairpin turn followed by a long, slightly curved front straightaway which runs the length of Shoreline Drive. The circuit is situated on the Long Beach waterfront, and is lined with palm trees (especially along the front straightaway towards the Aquarium of the Pacific), making for a scenic track. Long Beach is classified as an FIA Grade Two circuit.

The circuit has undergone numerous layout changes since the race's inception in 1975. All iterations have featured a signature hairpin turn, main stretch along Shoreline Drive, and back stretch along Seaside Way or Ocean Boulevard. The first grand prix layout measured 2.020 mi (3.251 km), and featured two hairpins, one at each end of the Shoreline Drive straightaway. In its early years, the starting line and the finish line were located on different sides of the course.

In 1982, the hairpin turn and the end of the main stretch (turn 1) was removed, and replaced with a 90-degree right turn, followed by 90-degree left turn. When the race became a CART series event, the layout was changed significantly. The final turn hairpin was moved to the east, closer to the pit entrance. Other slow chicanes and turns were removed. After a minor tweak to the layout in 1987, the track was shortened in 1992 by the removal of the Park Avenue loop. That created a longer Seaside Way back stretch and a faster run to the passing zone.

In 1999, due to new construction in the area, the turn one set of curves was removed, and replaced with the new fountain complex. Turn one now became a 90-degree left turn, leading into a roundabout around a fountain, and a series of three 90-degree turns. A year later, this segment was revised again, to create a longer straightaway leading to Pine Avenue. This course layout remains intact today.

In 2015, a modified 1.324 mi (2.131 km) version of the Grand Prix track was used during the Long Beach ePrix of the FIA Formula E Championship, which featured seven turns. The ePrix was held once again in 2016. In 2017, Formula E went to Brooklyn Street Circuit instead of there.

=== Layout history ===
Long Beach Street Circuit layout history
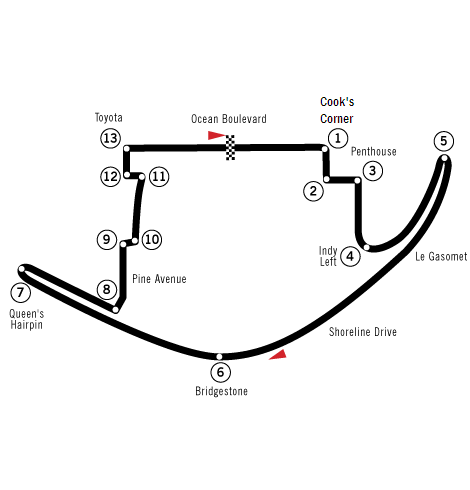
Grand Prix Circuit (1975–1977)

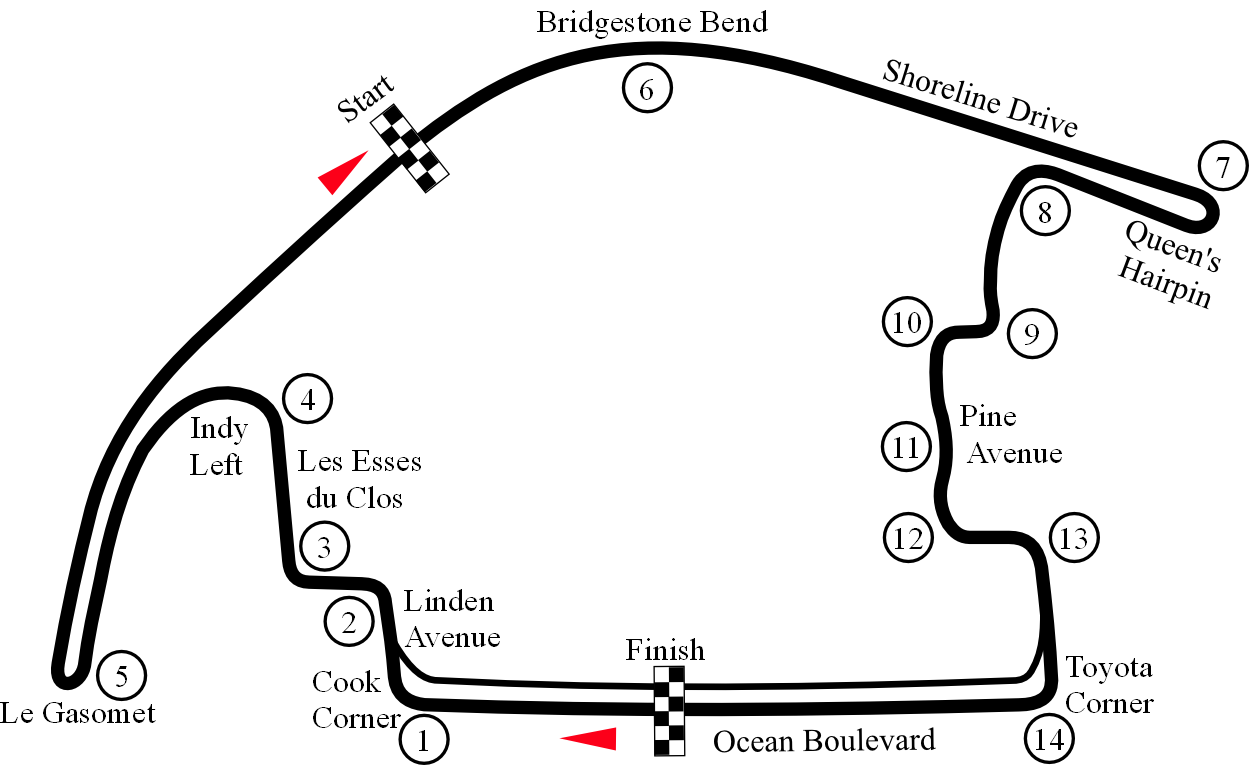
Grand Prix Circuit (1978–1981)

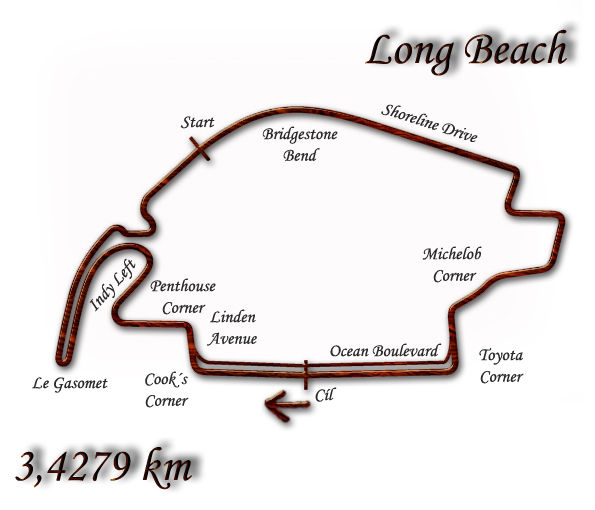
Grand Prix Circuit (1982)

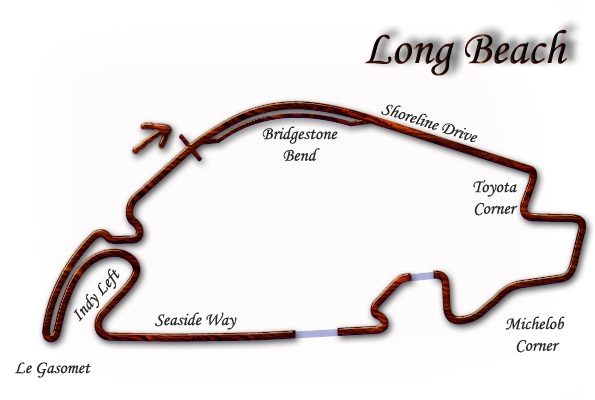
Grand Prix Circuit (1983)

Grand Prix Circuit (1984–1986)

Grand Prix Circuit (1987–1991)

Grand Prix Circuit (1992–1998)

Grand Prix Circuit (1999)

Grand Prix Circuit (2000–present)

Formula E Circuit (2015–2016)

== Events ==
=== Current ===
April

- IndyCar Series Grand Prix of Long Beach
- IMSA SportsCar Championship Grand Prix of Long Beach
- Formula D
- Porsche Carrera Cup North America
- Stadium Super Trucks

October

- Formula D

=== Former ===
- American Le Mans Series
  - American Le Mans Series at Long Beach (2007–2013)
- Atlantic Championship Series (1978–1982, 1989–2008)
- Champ Car World Series
  - Grand Prix of Long Beach (1984–2007)
- Formula E
  - Long Beach ePrix (2015–2016)
- Formula One
  - United States Grand Prix West (1976–1983)
- GT America Series (2024–2025)
- GT4 America Series (2019)
- IMSA GT Championship (1990–1991)
- Indy Lights (1989–2001, 2009–2015)
- North American Touring Car Championship (1997)
- Pirelli World Challenge (2006–2018)
- Rolex Sports Car Series
  - Grand Prix of Long Beach (2006)
- SCCA/USAC Formula 5000 Championship (1975)
- SCCA Formula Super Vee (1983–1988)
- Toyota Pro/Celebrity Race (1977–2016)
- Trans-Am Series (1987–1989, 1992–1993, 1996, 1998–2005)

== Lap records ==
The unofficial track record is 1:05.3095, set by Colton Herta in a Dallara DW12, during qualifying for the 2022 Acura Grand Prix of Long Beach. As of April 2026, the fastest official race lap records at the Long Beach Street Circuit are listed as:

Category	Time	Driver	Vehicle	Event
Grand Prix Circuit (2000–present): 1.968 mi (3.167 km)
IndyCar	1:07.2359	Álex Palou	Dallara IR-18	2022 Acura Grand Prix of Long Beach
Champ Car	1:07.931	Sébastien Bourdais	Lola B02/00	2006 Toyota Grand Prix of Long Beach
CART	1:08.981	Bruno Junqueira	Lola B02/00	2002 Toyota Grand Prix of Long Beach
DPi	1:10.317	Sébastien Bourdais	Cadillac DPi-V.R	2022 Grand Prix of Long Beach
LMDh	1:11.503	Connor De Phillippi	BMW M Hybrid V8	2023 Grand Prix of Long Beach
LMP2	1:12.383	Patrick Long	Porsche RS Spyder Evo	2008 American Le Mans Series at Long Beach
LMP1	1:12.599	Marco Werner	Audi R10 TDI	2008 American Le Mans Series at Long Beach
Indy Lights	1:12.9009	Félix Serrallés	Dallara IL-15	2015 Long Beach 100
LMH	1:13.828	Roman De Angelis	Aston Martin Valkyrie	2026 Grand Prix of Long Beach
DP	1:15.279	Dane Cameron	Corvette Daytona Prototype	2016 BUBBA Burger Sports Car Grand Prix
Formula Atlantic	1:16.058	Richard Philippe	Swift 016.a	2006 Long Beach Formula Atlantic round
LM GTE	1:17.215	Oliver Gavin	Chevrolet Corvette C7.R	2019 BUBBA Burger Sports Car Grand Prix
LMPC	1:17.244	Kyle Marcelli	Oreca FLM09	2016 BUBBA Burger Sports Car Grand Prix
GT1 (GTS)	1:17.415	Oliver Gavin	Chevrolet Corvette C6.R	2008 American Le Mans Series at Long Beach
Historic F1	1:18.055	Patrick Long	Williams FW08C	2023 Long Beach Historic F1 race
GT3	1:18.617	Raffaele Marciello	Mercedes-AMG GT3 Evo	2022 Grand Prix of Long Beach
GT	1:19.511	Oliver Gavin	Chevrolet Corvette C6.R	2013 American Le Mans Series at Long Beach
Porsche Carrera Cup	1:19.660	Kay van Berlo	Porsche 911 (992 I) GT3 Cup	2022 Long Beach Porsche Carrera Cup North America round
SRO GT2	1:21.216	Aaron Farhadi	Lamborghini Huracán Super Trofeo GT2	2024 Long Beach GT America round
Trans-Am	1:22.030	Paul Gentilozzi	Jaguar XKR	2003 Long Beach Trans-Am round
IMSA GTP	1:22.256	Patrick Long	Porsche 962	2022 Long Beach Historic IMSA GTP race
Group 7	1:22.307	Kirt Bennett	Shadow DN4	2017 Long Beach Can Am Challenge
IMSA GTO	1:24.448	Craig Bennett	Nissan 300ZX Turbo	2019 Long Beach Historic IMSA GTO/Trans-Am Invitational
GT4	1:25.773	Isaac Sherman	Porsche 718 Cayman GT4 RS Clubsport	2024 Long Beach GT America round
Toyota Pro/Celebrity Race	1:41.899	Frankie Muniz	Scion FR-S	2016 Toyota Pro/Celebrity Race
Stadium Super Trucks	1:44.939	Matthew Brabham	Stadium Super Truck	2019 Long Beach SST round
Formula E Circuit: 1.324 mi (2.131 km) (2015–2016)
Formula E	0:57.938	Sébastien Buemi	Renault Z.E 15	2016 Long Beach ePrix
Grand Prix Circuit (1999): 1.824 mi (2.935 km)
CART	1:02.779	Juan Pablo Montoya	Reynard 99I	1999 Toyota Grand Prix of Long Beach
Indy Lights	1:08.623	Felipe Giaffone	Lola T97/20	1999 Long Beach Indy Lights round
Grand Prix Circuit (1992–1998): 1.586 mi (2.552 km)
CART	0:51.333	Bobby Rahal	Reynard 98I	1998 Toyota Grand Prix of Long Beach
Indy Lights	0:57.190	Cristiano da Matta	Lola T97/20	1997 Long Beach Indy Lights round
Formula Atlantic	1:00.249	Jacques Villeneuve	Ralt RT40	1993 Long Beach Formula Atlantic round
Trans-Am	1:00.775	Tommy Kendall	Ford Mustang Trans-Am	1996 Long Beach Trans-Am round
Super Touring	1:06.731	Neil Crompton	Honda Accord	1997 Long Beach NATCC round
IMSA Supercar	1:10.248	Randy Pobst	BMW M5	1995 Long Beach IMSA Supercar round
Grand Prix Circuit (1984–1991): 1.670 mi (2.687 km)
CART	1:08.5563	Mario Andretti	Lola T900	1985 Long Beach Grand Prix
Formula Atlantic	1:13.482	Jimmy Vasser	Swift DB4	1991 Long Beach Formula Atlantic round
IMSA GTO	1:15.172	Pete Halsmer	Mazda RX-7	1991 IMSA Grand Prix of Long Beach
Trans-Am	1:17.772	Scott Pruett	Merkur XR4Ti	1988 Long Beach Trans-Am round
IMSA GTU	1:20.478	Stu Hayner	Dodge Daytona	1990 IMSA Grand Prix of Long Beach
IMSA AAC	1:23.020	J. D. Smith	Chevrolet Camaro	1991 IMSA Grand Prix of Long Beach
Grand Prix Circuit (1983): 2.035 mi (3.275 km)
Formula One	1:28.330	Niki Lauda	McLaren MP4/1C	1983 United States Grand Prix West
Grand Prix Circuit (1982): 2.130 mi (3.428 km)
Formula One	1:30.831	Niki Lauda	McLaren MP4B	1982 United States Grand Prix West
Formula Atlantic	1:37.621	Geoff Brabham	Ralt RT4	1982 Long Beach Formula Atlantic round
Grand Prix Circuit (1975–1981): 2.020 mi (3.251 km)
Formula One	1:19.830	Nelson Piquet	Brabham BT49	1980 United States Grand Prix West
Formula 5000	1:19.905	Tony Brise	Lola T332	1975 Long Beach Grand Prix
Formula Atlantic	1:27.232	Geoff Brabham	Ralt RT4	1981 Long Beach Formula Atlantic round
