= Detroit Grand Prix (Formula One) =

Formula 1 Grand Prix

- Detroit Street Circuit
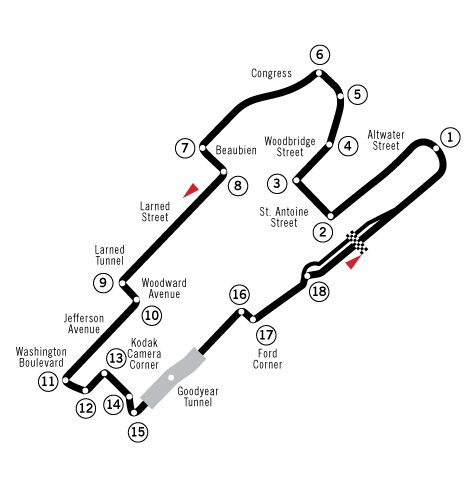

Race information
- Number of times held: 7
- First held: 1982
- Last held: 1988
- Most wins (drivers): (Brazil) Ayrton Senna (3)
- Most wins (constructors): (United Kingdom) Lotus (2) (United Kingdom) McLaren (2)
- Circuit length: 4.023 km (2.50 miles)
- Race length: 253.449 km (157.5 miles)
- Laps: 63

Last race (1988)

Pole position
- (Brazil) Ayrton Senna; McLaren-Honda; 1:40.606

Podium
- 1. (Brazil) A. Senna; McLaren-Honda; 1:55:41.842; 2. (France) A. Prost; McLaren-Honda; +38.713; 3. (Belgium) T. Boutsen; Benetton-Ford; +1 lap

Fastest lap
- (France) Alain Prost; McLaren-Honda; 1:44.836

Detroit Street Circuit in 1982

The title of Detroit Grand Prix (United States Grand Prix – East) was applied to the Formula One races held at the Detroit Street Circuit in Detroit, Michigan, United States of America from 1982 through 1988.

== History ==
In 1982, the U.S. became the first country to host three World Championship Grands Prix in one season. In addition to the United States Grand Prix West in Long Beach, California and the Las Vegas races, the new event was held in Detroit, Michigan on another street course encompassing the Renaissance Center, current headquarters of General Motors. This was the only time that three Formula One races were held in the same country until 2020, when Italy hosted the Italian Grand Prix at Autodromo Nazionale di Monza, the Emilia Romagna Grand Prix at the Autodromo Internazionale Enzo e Dino Ferrari, and the one-off Tuscan Grand Prix at the Autodromo Internazionale del Mugello. Since 2023 the United States has also hosted three Formula One races: the United States Grand Prix at the Circuit of the Americas in Austin, Texas, the Miami Grand Prix, and the Las Vegas Grand Prix.

The original circuit had seventeen corners in 2.493 miles, including two very tricky hairpins and a tunnel that enclosed a gentle right-hand bend next to the river, and proved to be even slower than Monaco. The rough, demanding course even included a railroad track crossing. 1983 saw one of the hairpins being bypassed as well as the final ever win for the Cosworth V8 engine that had been introduced to Formula One in 1967, and in 1986, Ayrton Senna overcame a tire puncture to win his first of five American races in six years.

Detroit got off to a bad start in 1982 due to organization problems. Practice planned for Thursday was cancelled, and the first qualifying session on Friday had to be postponed. There was time for only a one-hour practice session on Friday, and so qualifying would take place on Saturday in two one-hour sessions, four hours apart. Saturday was cold and overcast with a very real threat of rain, and nearly all the drivers scrambled to get a time in on the dry track while they could, with many spins and trips down the escape roads of the unfamiliar circuit. The afternoon session was wet throughout, as expected, and the times from the morning session did indeed determine the grid.

The race soon gained a reputation for being horrendously demanding and grueling, with the very bumpy track often breaking up badly under the consistently hot and very humid weather; it was perhaps the single hardest race on car and driver in Formula One during the 1980s – this race often produced races of attrition and the narrow track would often result in a large number of cars retiring during the race due to mechanical breakdown or contact with the concrete walls. Brakes and gearboxes in particular were tested to their breaking points – the drivers had to brake hard more than 20 times per lap and change gears around 50 to 60 times in one lap (cars had five-speed manual gearboxes in those days) – for 62 laps usually lasting around 1 minute and 45 seconds, which often meant races always lasted close to two hours. And like Monaco, if a driver put a wheel out of line or made even the slightest mistake, the punishment, mechanical or on time – was very harsh and almost always absolute. 1982 and 1983 were races held in early June, but from 1984 to 1988, the race was held in late June, when the temperature difference is considerable in Detroit for a two-week timeframe – weather conditions are considerably hotter and generally less pleasant in Detroit around late June. At least half of the field retired in each race; it was often considered an achievement if a driver could finish this race, let alone win it.

Although the weather and track breakup in 1986 and 1987 was not as intense (thanks to the slightly cloudy skies and the slightly cooler weather that occurred precisely in those two years in particular) as it had been in 1984 and 1985, Detroit was removed from the Formula One schedule after 1988 when F1's governing body FISA declared the temporary pit area wasn't up to the required standard. FISA and FOCA wanted a permanent pits facility, but the City of Detroit was not willing to spend the money to build such facilities. The 1988 race was a very hot race, and the circuit broke up very badly – this was the worst state the circuit had ever been in – even worse than 1984 and 1985. Such track problems often occurred, but the track disintegration was worse that year due to the intense heat and humidity. The race had always been the hardest race of the year, terribly difficult on the car and driver – but by now, the race had worn out its welcome and it had become downright unpleasant. The race was already unpopular among drivers, and as a result, a number of drivers after the Grand Prix that year had finally had enough and became outspoken with their dislike of the event. For the 1989 season, it was originally planned to move the F1 Grand Prix to a new circuit at Belle Isle. However, an agreement could not be established, and the only American Grand Prix of the year moved to Phoenix for 1989–1991, which was known as the United States Grand Prix, the first official USGP to be run since the 1980 race at Watkins Glen in New York. Upon the departure of F1, the Detroit race was replaced by the CART-sanctioned Detroit Indy Grand Prix which in 1992 moved to the Belle Isle circuit originally proposed for F1.

== Winners ==
=== By year ===
Year	Driver	Constructor	Report
1982	(United Kingdom) John Watson	McLaren-Ford	Report
1983	(Italy) Michele Alboreto	Tyrrell-Ford	Report
1984	(Brazil) Nelson Piquet	Brabham-BMW	Report
1985	(Finland) Keke Rosberg	Williams-Honda	Report
1986	(Brazil) Ayrton Senna	Lotus-Renault	Report
1987	(Brazil) Ayrton Senna	Lotus-Honda	Report
1988	(Brazil) Ayrton Senna	McLaren-Honda	Report

=== Repeat winners (drivers) ===
Wins	Driver	Years won
3	(Brazil) Ayrton Senna	1986, 1987, 1988

=== Repeat winners (constructors) ===
Teams in bold are competing in the Formula One championship in 2026.

Wins	Constructor	Years won
2	(United Kingdom) Lotus	1986, 1987
2	**(United Kingdom) McLaren**	1982, 1988

=== Repeat winners (engine manufacturers) ===
Manufacturers in bold are competing in the Formula One championship in 2026.

Wins	Manufacturer	Years won
3	**(Japan) Honda**	1985, 1987, 1988
2	(United States) Ford *	1982, 1983

* Built by Cosworth

== Lap records ==
- Qualifying: 1:38.301 – Ayrton Senna, Lotus-Renault, 1986
- Race: 1:40.464 – Ayrton Senna, Lotus-Honda, 1987

== See also ==
- List of Formula One Championship events
- United States Grand Prix
- Grand Prix of America
- United States Grand Prix West
- Caesars Palace Grand Prix
- Dallas Grand Prix
- Detroit Grand Prix (IndyCar)
