= United States Grand Prix West =

Formula 1 Grand Prix

- Long Beach Street Circuit
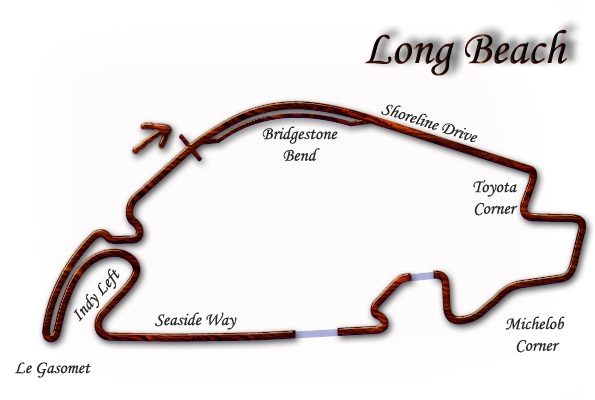

Race information
- Number of times held: 8
- First held: 1976
- Last held: 1983
- Most wins (drivers): No repeat winners
- Most wins (constructors): (Italy) Ferrari (3)
- Circuit length: 3.275 km (2.035 miles)
- Race length: 245.625 km (152.62 miles)
- Laps: 75

Last race (1983)

Pole position
- (France) Patrick Tambay; Ferrari; 1:26.117

Podium
- 1. (United Kingdom) John Watson; McLaren-Ford; 1:53:34.889; 2. (Austria) Niki Lauda; McLaren-Ford; +27.993; 3. (France) René Arnoux; Ferrari; + 1:13.638

Fastest lap
- (Austria) Niki Lauda; McLaren-Ford; 1:28.330

The United States Grand Prix West was a race held on the Long Beach Street Circuit, in Long Beach, California, as a Formula One World Championship event from 1976 to 1983 held in the same location throughout those years.

The Grand Prix was so named as it was held in the Western United States and the United States Grand Prix title was already on the calendar as a race at Watkins Glen for most of the event's history.

== History ==
There had been an attempt to bring about a second American Formula One Grand Prix, specifically to Southern California in 1972, with the United States Grand Prix West at the ultra modern Ontario Motor Speedway after the success of the Questor Grand Prix in 1971, but this was unsuccessful.

With the east coast Watkins Glen track on the downslope after two fatalities in successive years and a politically charged 1975 event, the USGP West was created for the 1976 season on a tight circuit made up of city streets in Long Beach, California, located in the Los Angeles metropolitan area on the west coast. A Formula 5000 race was held there in 1975, and the US was just the second country (after Italy in 1957) to host two championship F1 events in the same season. Southern California had seen a championship Formula One race before; the 1960 United States Grand Prix was held at the famed Riverside Raceway, which was just an hour's drive from Long Beach. Like most street circuits used in Formula One and other disciplines of motor racing, Long Beach gained a reputation for being a grueling race that was very punishing on the car and driver; typical for a city street circuit the race was an intense test of brakes, suspensions, and transmissions. The circuit was an immediate success from its first race in 1976, and it became the U.S.'s answer to the Monaco Grand Prix—it was just as popular an event as the most important of Formula One Grand Prix races—and the typically sunny and excellent Southern California weather made for a very pleasant setting. The 1976 event was won by Swiss Clay Regazzoni in a Ferrari with his teammate Niki Lauda finishing 2nd and Patrick Depailler finishing 3rd while furiously charging through the field after an incident he had early in the race.

In 1977, a race-long battle between Lauda, South African Jody Scheckter in a Wolf and American Mario Andretti in a Lotus. After being stuck behind Scheckter for most of the race, Andretti outbraked the South African into Queen's Hairpin and took a popular victory; Lauda also passed Scheckter and took 2nd; and the Wolf driver completed the podium with 3rd place.

In 1978 the start/finish line was moved to the long sweeping Shoreline Drive at the bottom of the circuit, rather than starting where the pits were on Ocean Boulevard. So the race distance was 79.5 laps, and the parade lap went from the pits to the start on Shoreline Drive rather than completing a whole lap. That race was won by Argentine Carlos Reutemann, and Australian Alan Jones finished a great 2nd place for the new Williams team, their first ever podium position.

In 1979, Queen's Hairpin was narrowed in order to create a more consistent track width for the start, and it got off to a confused start in which Reutemann was prevented from joining the start after trouble with his Lotus during the warm-up. The field was not stopped under orders, so Canadian pole-sitter Gilles Villeneuve continued and the field followed him back to the pits. Frenchman Jacques Laffite's engine seized and he hopped into the spare car. Reutemann went out anyway half a lap behind the others; he retired with gearbox problems. The race saw a spirited drive from Frenchman Jean-Pierre Jarier in the Tyrrell. He climbed up to 2nd behind Villeneuve in a Ferrari, although he had to drop back to finish 6th. Villeneuve won from his teammate Scheckter.

In 1980 there was a number of incidents, including a messy pile-up at the Le Gasomet hairpin. Alfa Romeo driver Bruno Giacomelli spun entering that corner and came to a dead stop, with his Alfa's nose mere feet away from the apex of the corner. In a rather impatient attempt to get out of this precarious situation he had put himself in, Giacomelli had put his Alfa in reverse, and as a result, a number of oncoming cars, all attempting to avoid Giacomelli, who had reversed onto the racing line, had to come to a dead stop in order to avoid hitting Giacomelli. This created an accordion-effect accident, which led to 4 other cars also crashing, including Jarier, who had crashed a lot heavier than any of the other drivers by hitting Italian Elio de Angelis's Lotus with some force. But the worst accident was yet to come- Clay Regazzoni in an Ensign crashed appallingly when his brakes failed at 180 mph at the end of Shoreline Drive. While going off the course, the Swiss driver hit Ricardo Zunino's crashed and stationary Brabham at full speed. He then hit the wall next to the track and went straight-on past Queen's Hairpin and crashed into retaining tire barriers head-on, still moving extremely quickly. This devastating accident did not seem to be survivable. Regazzoni did survive, but with severe spinal injuries, leaving him paralyzed from the waist down; he never raced in F1 again but did race again in other forms of motorsports, albeit with hand controls rather than pedals. Brazilian Nelson Piquet dominated that race weekend, it was the first of his twenty-three F1 victories, with his countryman Emerson Fittipaldi taking 3rd.

1981 brought a slight change to the course, with one of the left handers at Pine Avenue being re-made from two corners to one corner. This race saw Italian Riccardo Patrese take pole position from the dominant Williams duo of Alan Jones and Reutemann; Patrese eventually dropped back with mechanical problems and Reutemann made a mistake at one of the turns on Pine Avenue so Jones slipped by to take the lead, which he held until the checkered flag.

For 1982, there were more changes to the circuit, which removed Queen's Hairpin and most of Pine Avenue. A whole new section of road was used for the race; the Clos esses were changed and there was a chicane placed on Shoreline Drive. Thus, the race distance was shortened from 79.5 to 75.5 laps. This race saw Ferrari take a neutral stance on the FISA–FOCA war by mounting 2 differently sized wings on the back of their cars. As a symbol of where the conflict would go, these 2 wings exploited a loophole in the regulations; there was no rule saying how many wings could be on an F1 car at a championship event at that time. Niki Lauda won this race, his 3rd race since his temporary retirement and his first victory since 1978, from Finn Keke Rosberg in a Williams, and the Finn battled fiercely with Villeneuve in his more powerful turbo-charged Ferrari; Villeneuve finished 3rd but was disqualified because of the two wings mounted on the back of his car. The race itself was beset by a few organizational problems (even though the US GP West was known to be one of the best organized races of the year), including a crash truck dangerously putting itself on the racing line at the end of a blind corner and then driving in front of Lauda's McLaren while it was carrying Nelson Piquet's damaged Brabham, and track breakup over the newer parts of the course. American Mario Andretti made a one-off appearance for the Williams team; he crashed on the 20th lap.

The final event in 1983 brought more track modifications and the organizational issues eliminated. The elevated Ocean Boulevard and the steep runs up to and down from it were no longer used; and Seaside Way, a road (level with the rest of the circuit) that runs parallel to Ocean Boulevard was used instead. The revised circuit also included a number of tight turns built around the Convention Center and a slightly shortened Le Gasomet hairpin so that Ocean Boulevard could still be used by everyday traffic. The pits were moved down to Shoreline Drive. John Watson won from 22nd place on the grid, the farthest back from which a modern Grand Prix driver had ever come to win a race, taking advantage of the front runners retiring and an incident between Rosberg and Frenchman Patrick Tambay. Watson's teammate Lauda finished 2nd after starting from 23rd on the grid.

After the 1983 event, the event was deemed too expensive to run. Rumors persisted during the whole 1983 weekend that race organizer Chris Pook, the main figure in the attempt to create a "Monte Carlo of the United States" in Long Beach, had decided that Formula One was too expensive and risky. Shipping the F1 equipment all the way over from Europe and Brazil and increased FOCA fees had made the race financially unfeasible, particularly in a country where the financial culture meant that short-term returns on business investments were paramount, and Long Beach had never been paired with any other nearby race in Mexico or elsewhere in the United States, so the costs could not be cut. Pook had been approached by CART and announced after the 1983 F1 race that he planned to run an IndyCar race at Long Beach in 1984 instead of F1. Despite tremendous success since the race's inception in 1976, and the observable impact of the global exposure it brought to the city and to the Los Angeles area in general, the organizers believed that the less expensive and domestically more popular CART championship, having mostly American drivers such as Mario Andretti, Rick Mears, and Al Unser, would be a more promising investment. The IndyCar race proved to be a mainstay and is still being run. It is one of the most popular and well-attended races on that calendar.

Part of the interior of the circuit is the 13,600 seat Long Beach Convention Center which also doubled as the pit paddock for the Formula One teams when in Long Beach.

=== Continued absence ===
In 2013, there was some media speculation that Formula One could replace IndyCar at Long Beach in 2016, as IndyCar's contract with the City of Long Beach was to expire in 2015 and Formula One boss Bernie Ecclestone had expressed interest in having his series return to the highly populated Los Angeles metropolitan area. However, on April 1, 2014, the Long Beach City Council informed the race's organizer that the IndyCar Series had been granted a three-year extension, through the 2018 season.

== Layout ==
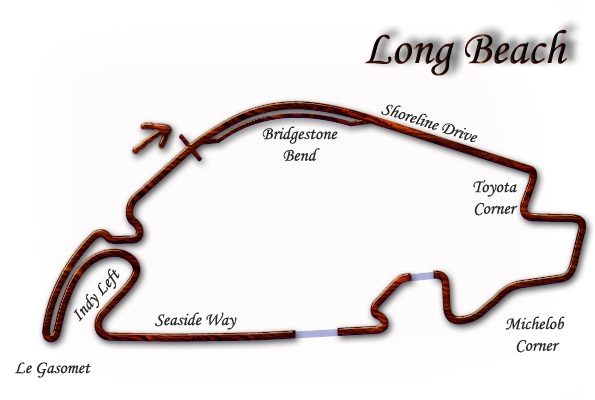
Long Beach Grand Prix Circuit (1983)

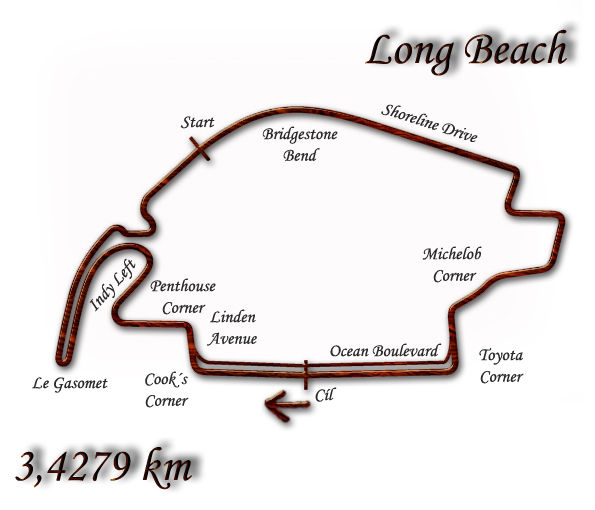
Long Beach Grand Prix Circuit (1982)

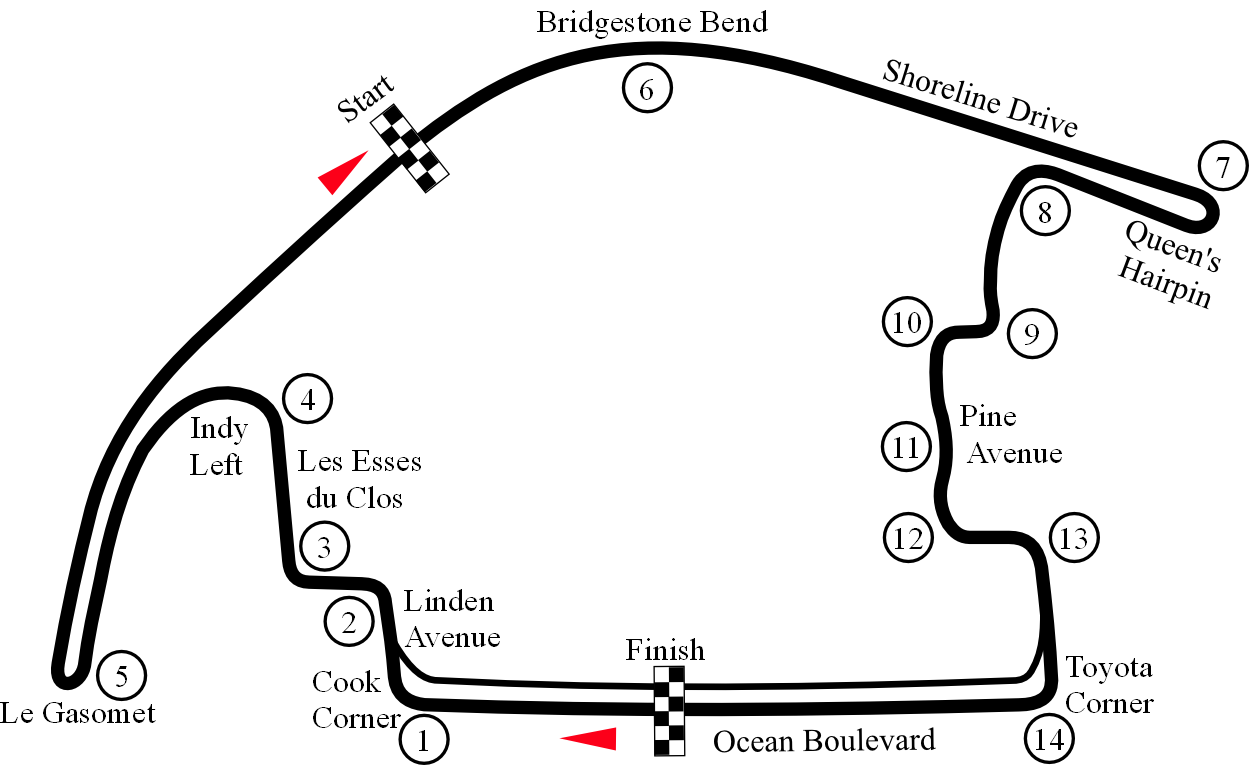
Long Beach Grand Prix Circuit (1978–1981)

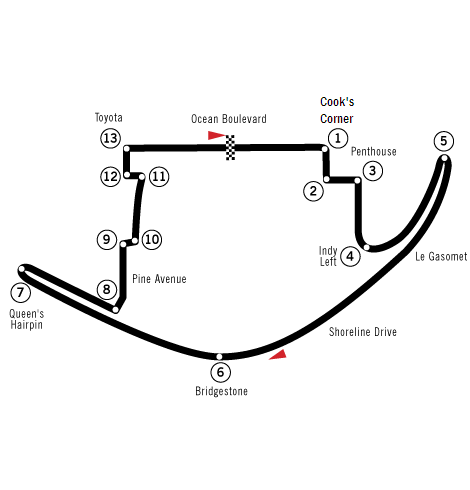
Long Beach Grand Prix Circuit (1976–1977)

== Winners ==
=== By year ===
- All races were held on the same circuit on various layouts.

Year	Date	Driver	Constructor	Chassis	Engine	Tires	Race distance		Race time	Average speed (mph)	Report
Year	Date	Driver	Constructor	Chassis	Engine	Tires	Laps	Miles (km)	Race time	Average speed (mph)	Report
1976	March 28	(Switzerland) Clay Regazzoni	Scuderia Ferrari SpA SEFAC	Ferrari 312T	Ferrari	Goodyear (2)	80	161.6 (260.069)	1:53:18	85.572	Report
1977	April 3	(United States) Mario Andretti	Team Lotus	Lotus 78	Ford–Cosworth	Goodyear (3)	80	161.6 (260.069)	1:51:35	87.073	Report
1978	April 2	(Argentina) Carlos Reutemann	Scuderia Ferrari SpA SEFAC (2)	Ferrari 312T3 (2)	Ferrari (2)	Michelin	80	161.6 (260.069)	1:52:01	86.555	Report
1979	April 8	(Canada) Gilles Villeneuve	Scuderia Ferrari SpA SEFAC (3)	Ferrari 312T4 (3)	Ferrari (3)	Michelin (2)	80	161.6 (260.069)	1:50:25	87.812	Report
1980	March 30	(Brazil) Nelson Piquet	Brabham Racing Team	Brabham BT49	Ford–Cosworth (2)	Goodyear (4)	80	161.6 (260.069)	1:50:18	87.899	Report
1981	March 15	(Australia) Alan Jones	Williams Racing Team	Williams FW07	Ford–Cosworth (3)	Goodyear (5)	80	161.6 (260.069)	1:50:41	87.601	Report
1982	April 4	(Austria) Niki Lauda	McLaren International	McLaren MP4/1	Ford–Cosworth (4)	Goodyear (6)	75	159.75 (257.092)	1:58:25	80.939	Report
1983	March 27	(United Kingdom) John Watson	McLaren International (2)	McLaren MP4/1 (2)	Ford–Cosworth (5)	Michelin (3)	75	152.55 (245.505)	1:53:34	80.624	Report

=== Repeat winners (constructors) ===
Constructors in bold are competing in the Formula One championship in 2026.

Wins	Constructor	Years won
3	**(Italy) Ferrari**	1976, 1978, 1979
2	**(United Kingdom) McLaren**	1982, 1983

=== Repeat winners (engine manufacturers) ===
Manufacturers in bold are competing in the Formula One championship in 2026.

Wins	Manufacturers	Years won
5	(United States) Ford*	1977, 1980, 1981, 1982, 1983
3	**(Italy) Ferrari**	1976, 1978, 1979

* Built by Cosworth, engine program funded by Ford

== See also ==
- United States Grand Prix
- Detroit Grand Prix
- Dallas Grand Prix
- Caesars Palace Grand Prix
- Grand Prix of America
