= Speed Energy =

Energy drink company

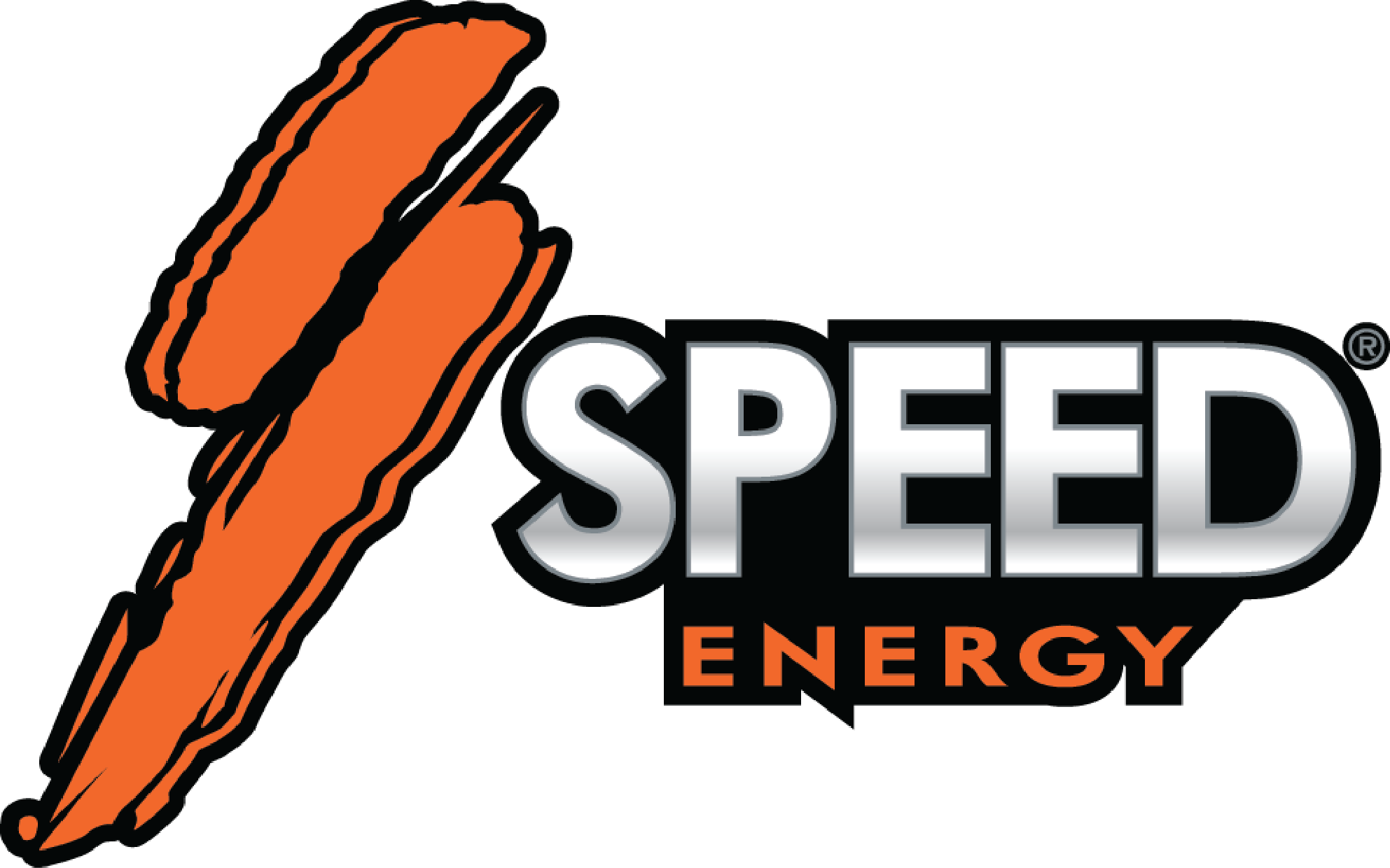
- Type: Private
- Industry: Drink industry
- Founded: 2010
- Founders: Robby Gordon; Steven Nichols
- Products: Energy drink
- Owners: Robby Gordon
- Website: speedenergy.com

Speed Energy, officially branded as SPEED Energy, is an energy drink produced by American racing driver Robby Gordon. Created in 2010 to support his Robby Gordon Motorsports team in NASCAR, Speed sponsors Gordon's Stadium Super Trucks series and his off-road racing program.

The energy drink is part of a range of brands owned by Gordon under the Speed name.

== History ==
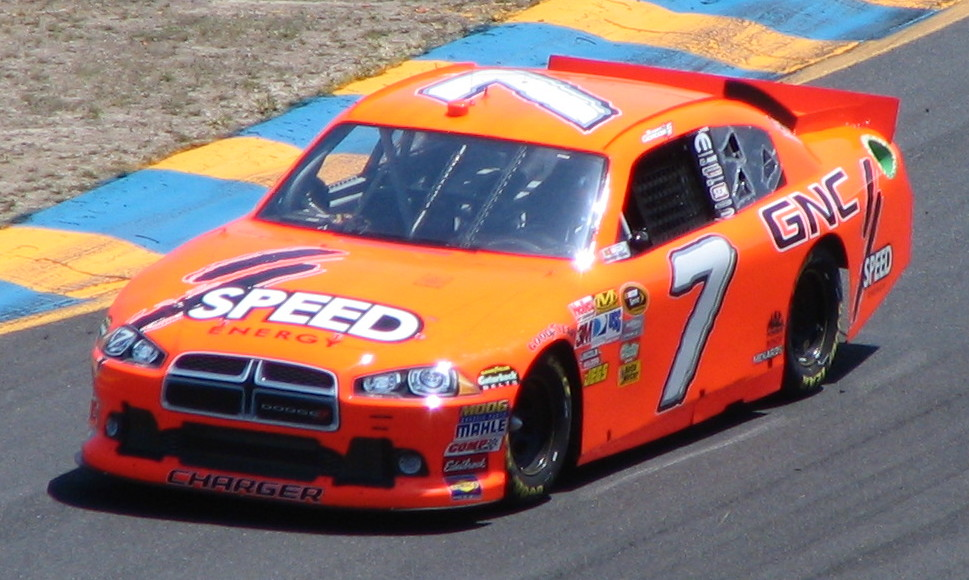
Robby Gordon's Speed Energy-sponsored NASCAR car at Infineon Raceway in 2011

During his NASCAR career, Gordon regularly raced with sponsorship from energy drinks like Red Bull and Monster Energy. In October 2010, he founded Speed Energy as a means to generate funding for his financially struggling Robby Gordon Motorsports team. The brand appeared on Gordon's No. 7 car at that month's NASCAR Sprint Cup Series race at Talladega Superspeedway. During RGM's operation, other NASCAR drivers to raced with Speed colors include Scott Wimmer, P. J. Jones, and Reed Sorenson. In 2012, Eddie Sharp Racing driver Justin Lofton competed in the NASCAR Camping World Truck Series with Speed Energy sponsorship. Speed has also sponsored Gordon's off-road racing efforts beginning with the Baja 1000 in November 2010; later off-road races like the Dakar Rally saw Gordon compete under the Team SPEED banner.

In November 2010, Gordon was sued by Specialized Bicycle Components on the claim that Speed Energy's S-shaped logo too closely resembled Specialized's; the lawsuit was dropped in December after Gordon assured he would modify his logo and recall any cans with the logo.

Gordon quietly retired from NASCAR competition after 2012 and formed the Stadium Super Trucks series. In 2014, Speed Energy shared series title sponsorship with Traxxas as SST became "Speed Energy Formula Off-Road presented by Traxxas". When SST split into American and Australian championships in 2020, the former became the Speed Energy Stadium Super Trucks.

In addition to Speed Energy, Gordon established various companies under the Speed banner like the utility vehicle manufacturer Speed UTV, remote-control off-road truck brand Speed RC Cars, and racing tool maker Speed Tools. Speed UTV, whose vehicles feature inspiration from Gordon's racing career such as the Indy Racing League and SST, is led by Todd Romano and Gordon's former engine builder Tony Cola. Speed RC Cars has also appeared as a sponsor in SST for drivers like Gordon's son Max.

== Flavors ==
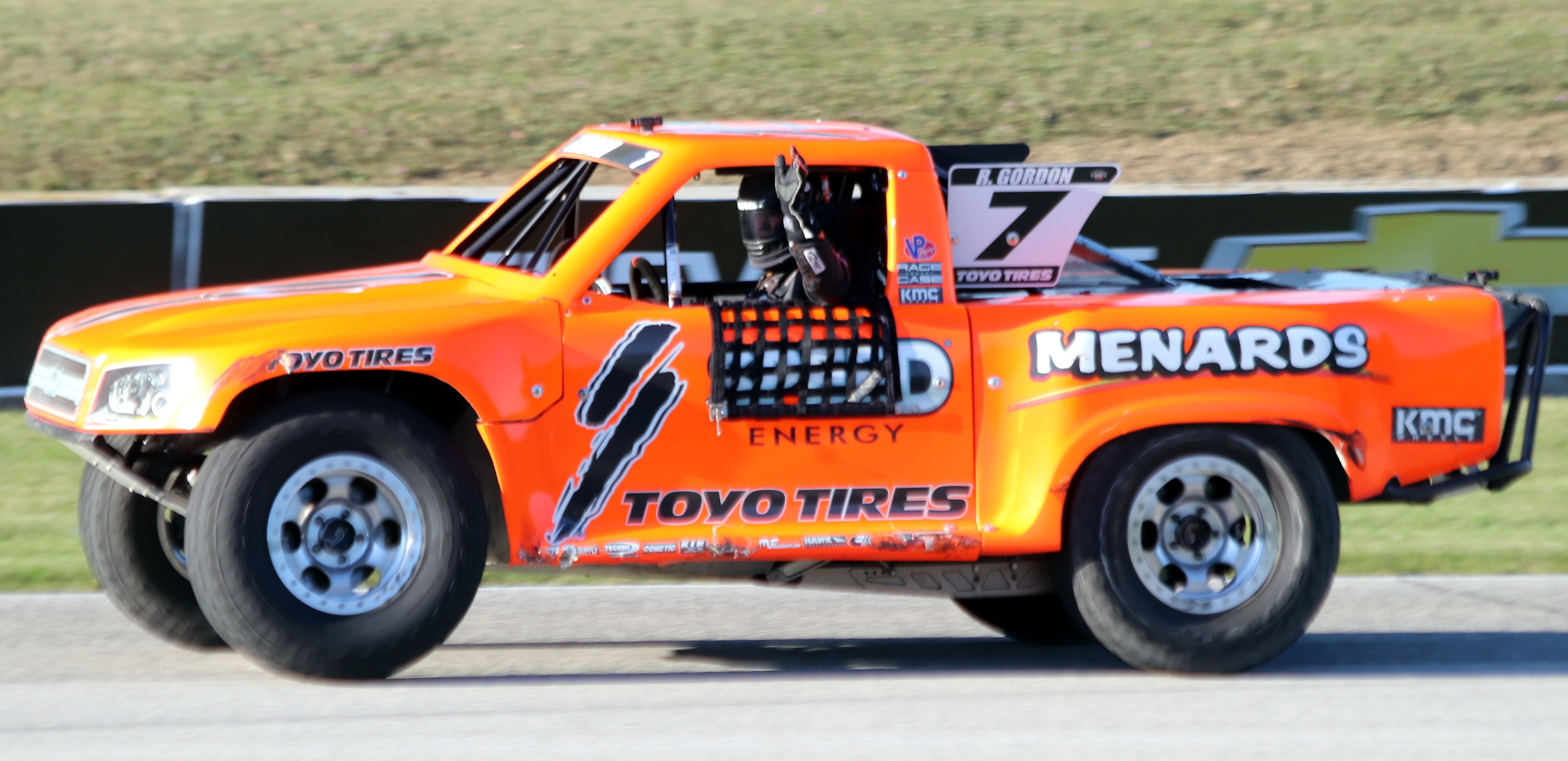
Gordon's Speed Energy Stadium Super Truck at Road America in 2019

Promoted as a "vitamin energy drink", Speed Energy consists of five flavors:

- Fuel (citrus)
- Unleaded (non-calorie and -carbohydrate)
- Octane (candy)
- Ethanol (mixture of Fuel and Octane flavors)
- Black Tea Lemonade
