= Robby Gordon =

American racing driver

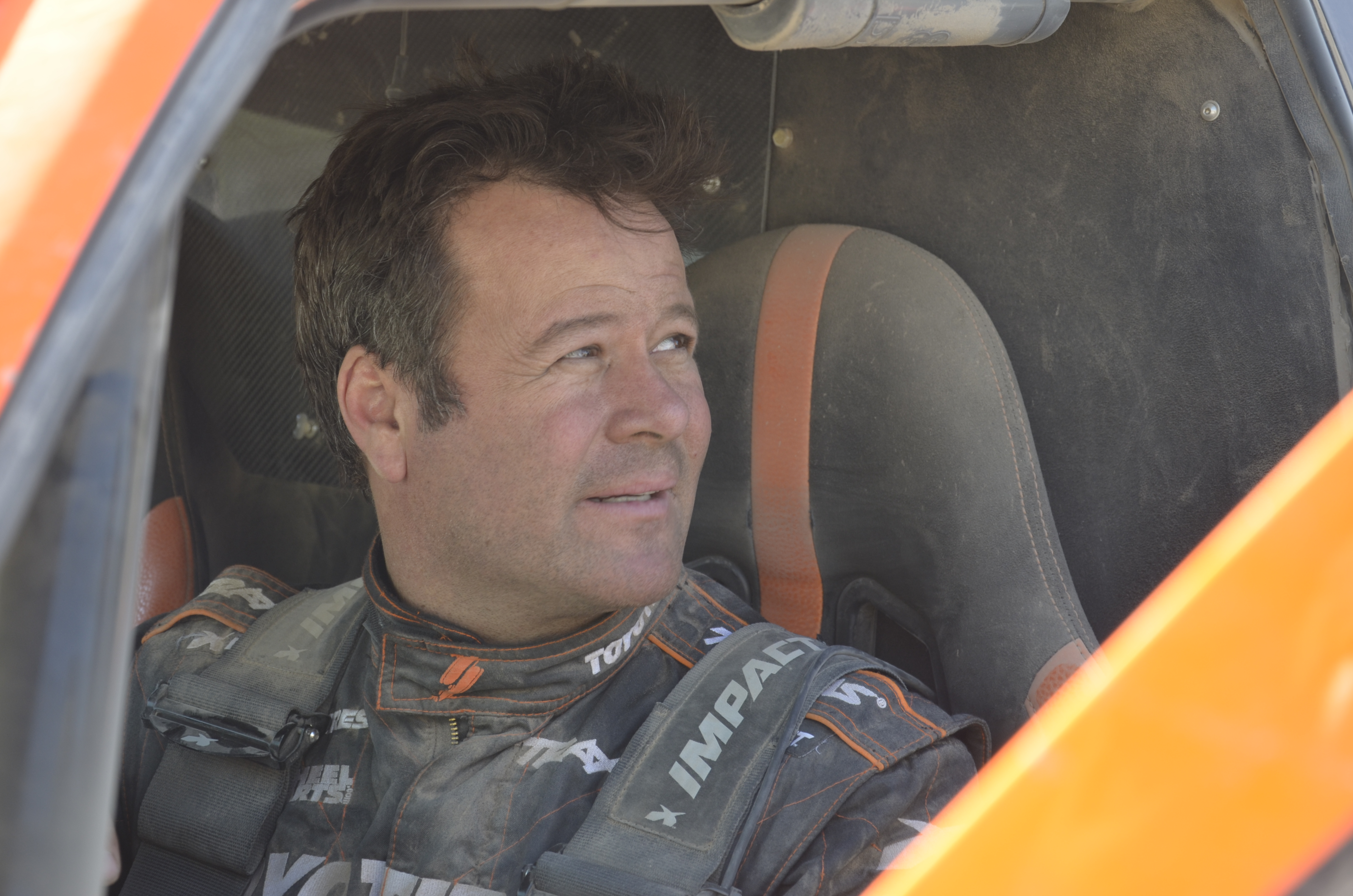
- Gordon in 2014
- Born: Robert Wesley Gordon; January 2, 1969 (age 57) Los Angeles, California, U.S.
- Relatives: Huntley Gordon (great-grandfather); Bob Gordon (father); Beccy Gordon (sister); Robyn Gordon (sister); Ryan Hunter-Reay (brother in-law); Max Gordon (son)

Stadium Super Trucks career
- Debut season: 2013
- Car number: 7
- Starts: 160
- Championships: 3
- Wins: 32
- Podiums: 101
- Poles: 20
- Best finish: 1st in 2013, 2014, 2024
- Finished last season: 4th (2025)

Championship titles
- 2013–2014, 2024: Stadium Super Trucks

NASCAR Cup Series career
- 396 races run over 19 years
- 2012 position: 52nd
- Best finish: 16th (2003)
- First race: 1991 Daytona 500 (Daytona)
- Last race: 2012 Toyota/Save Mart 350 (Sonoma)
- First win: 2001 New Hampshire 300 (New Hampshire)
- Last win: 2003 Sirius at the Glen (Watkins Glen)
| Wins | Top tens | Poles |
|---|---|---|
| 3 | 39 | 1 |

NASCAR O'Reilly Auto Parts Series career
- 54 races run over 9 years
- 2011 position: 129th
- Best finish: 21st (2004)
- First race: 2001 GNC Live Well 250 (Watkins Glen)
- Last race: 2011 NAPA Auto Parts 200 (Montreal)
- First win: 2004 Emerson Radio 250 (Richmond)
| Wins | Top tens | Poles |
|---|---|---|
| 1 | 18 | 0 |

NASCAR FedEx Freight Truck Series career
- 4 races run over 3 years
- 2008 position: 71st
- Best finish: 68th (1996)
- First race: 1996 Lowe's 250 (North Wilkesboro)
- Last race: 2004 O'Reilly 200 (Bristol)
| Wins | Top tens | Poles |
|---|---|---|
| 0 | 2 | 0 |

ARCA Menards Series career
- 1 race run over 1 year
- Best finish: 97th (1990)
- First race: 1990 Atlanta Journal ARCA 500k (Atlanta)
| Wins | Top tens | Poles |
|---|---|---|
| 0 | 0 | 1 |

IndyCar Series career
- 8 races run over 7 years
- Best finish: 29th (2000)
- First race: 1996 Las Vegas 500K (Las Vegas)
- Last race: 2004 Indianapolis 500 (Indy)
| Wins | Podiums | Poles |
|---|---|---|
| 0 | 0 | 0 |

Champ Car career
- 107 races run over 8 years
- Years active: 1992–1999
- Best finish: 5th (1994, 1995)
- First race: 1992 ITT Automotive Grand Prix of Detroit (Belle Isle)
- Last race: 1999 Marlboro 500 (California)
- First win: 1995 Slick 50 200 (Phoenix)
- Last win: 1995 ITT Automotive Grand Prix of Detroit (Belle Isle)
| Wins | Podiums | Poles |
|---|---|---|
| 2 | 9 | 4 |
Medal record
Representing United States
Summer X Games
| Silver medal – second place | 2015 Austin | Stadium Super Trucks |
| Bronze medal – third place | 2014 Austin | Stadium Super Trucks |
- Statistics up to date as of May 13, 2026.

Robert Wesley Gordon (born January 2, 1969) is an American semi-retired auto racing driver. He has raced in NASCAR, CART, the IndyCar Series, the Trans-Am Series, IMSA, IROC and the Dakar Rally. While no longer competing in IndyCar and NASCAR racing, he is active in top-tier off road motorsports such as BITD, NORRA, and SCORE International.

Gordon owns and competes in the Stadium Super Trucks (SST), a series he formed in 2013 and whose championship he won in 2013, 2014 and 2024. He also operates the Speed family of brands, which includes the energy drink Speed Energy that has sponsored his racing efforts since 2010.

== Off-road racing ==
Gordon, the son of off-road racer Bob "Baja Bob" Gordon, started out competing in off road racing. He won five consecutive SCORE International off-road class championships from 1986 to 1990, a sixth championship in 1996, and a seventh championship in 2009. Gordon also won two championships in the Mickey Thompson stadium series, three Baja 500 in 1989, 1990, and 2005, and three Baja 1000 in 1987, 1989, and 2006. Gordon also participated (and won) the last SCORE International off road race at the now closed Riverside Raceway in 1988.

Gordon had continued off-road racing throughout his career in Champ Car and NASCAR. In 2005 Gordon took part in the famous sixteen-day Dakar Rally, driving for the Red Bull sponsored Volkswagen team. He became the first American to win a stage in the car division. He won two stages in total and a twelfth place division finish. In 2006, Gordon took part in the Dakar Rally in a Hummer H3. Team Dakar USA did well until stage nine, when a damaged radiator caused late arrival at Atar, Mauritania, and subsequent disqualification. Gordon and co-driver Andy McMillin won the trophy truck class in the 2006 Baja 1000, finishing second overall in the race. After that, Gordon competed in his third Dakar Rally in 2007, driving the Monster Energy Hummer H3 for Team Dakar USA. He finished in the eighth position, his best finish in this race. His current trophy truck sponsor is Speed Energy and drove his Monster Energy truck in the 2007 Baja 500 with a second overall finish. Gordon's sisters Beccy Gordon and Robyn Gordon competed in the 2006 Baja 1000 on the all-woman team All-American Girl Racing.

Gordon raced in selected Traxxas TORC Series events, including the 2010 AMSOIL Cup World Championship race at Crandon International Off-Road Raceway. He led the first lap of the race before retiring with mechanical difficulties.

Gordon finished third in the 2009 Dakar Rally in South America, where the event was moved after terrorist threats led to the cancellation of the 2008 event. He finished eighth in the 2010 Dakar Rally in South America with his Monster Energy truck. He was excluded from the 2012 edition after stage 10 for illegal modifications of his engine.

=== Stadium Super Trucks ===
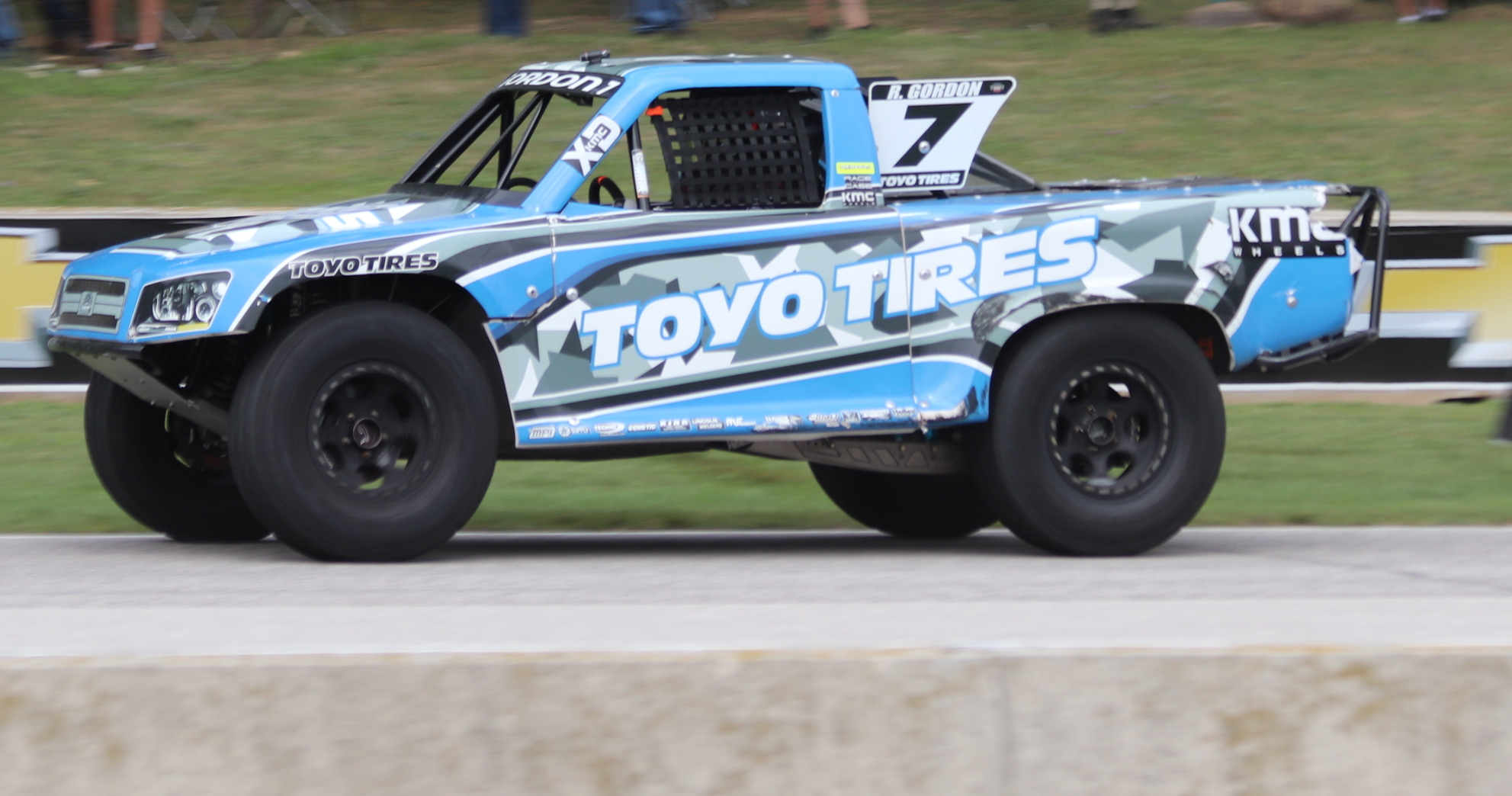
Gordon's 2018 Stadium Super Truck at Road America

In June 2012, Gordon announced that he was founding and owning a stadium truck racing series of his own, titled the Stadium Super Trucks, based on the stadium truck racing concept developed by Mickey Thompson. The series ran its first season in 2013.

A lot of drivers affiliated with Gordon's closed Cup Series NASCAR team such as P. J. Jones for example, followed Gordon to race in the Super Trucks.

Gordon won the inaugural Stadium Super Truck championship in 2013, by seven points following a year-long battle with former Mickey Thompson Off-Road teammate Rob MacCachren.

Gordon's series was renamed to Speed Energy Formula Off-Road in 2014. He won a second championship that year with six wins and a 75-point advantage over Sheldon Creed. That year, the series also made its X Games debut as part of X Games Austin 2014, where Gordon finished third and won a bronze medal. He medalled again in 2015 as he scored a silver.

Since 2015, the series started expansion overseas, hosting a race in Australia at the Adelaide 500. Later in the year, Gordon also participated in the Goodwood Festival of Speed in Britain.

During the 2017 and 2018 seasons, SST and the Confederation of Australian Motor Sport (CAMS) clashed on various instances. In June 2017, the night following an SST race at Hidden Valley Raceway in Australia's Darwin, Northern Territory, Gordon took a truck to a local nightclub and began to perform donuts. A day later, he was summoned to court for violating the city's anti-hooning laws and was fined $4,150 after pleading guilty on four traffic charges. Gordon defended his action, stating he had asked security guards if it was allowed, to which they agreed. CAMS subsequently revoked Gordon's competition visa for future events, indefinitely prohibiting him from racing in Australia. Four months later, Gordon issued an apology to CAMS and donated $10,000 to the Australian Road Safety Foundation, resulting in his visa ban being lifted. In 2018, the series was banned by CAMS for safety reasons following a wreck at Barbagallo Raceway that sent a truck's wheel into a vacant pedestrian bridge; despite legal action from Gordon, SST lost the case. CAMS ended the ban in 2019 as the sanctioning body and Gordon formed a three-year commercial rights agreement, branding the series' Australian operations the Boost Mobile Super Trucks; the new Australian championship began in 2020.

== IMSA ==
In 1990, Gordon began racing sports cars. He won races in both Trans-Am and IMSA Camel GT, where he had four consecutive class wins in the 24 Hours of Daytona from 1990 to 1994, and three consecutive 12 Hours of Sebring class wins.

== Open-wheel racing ==
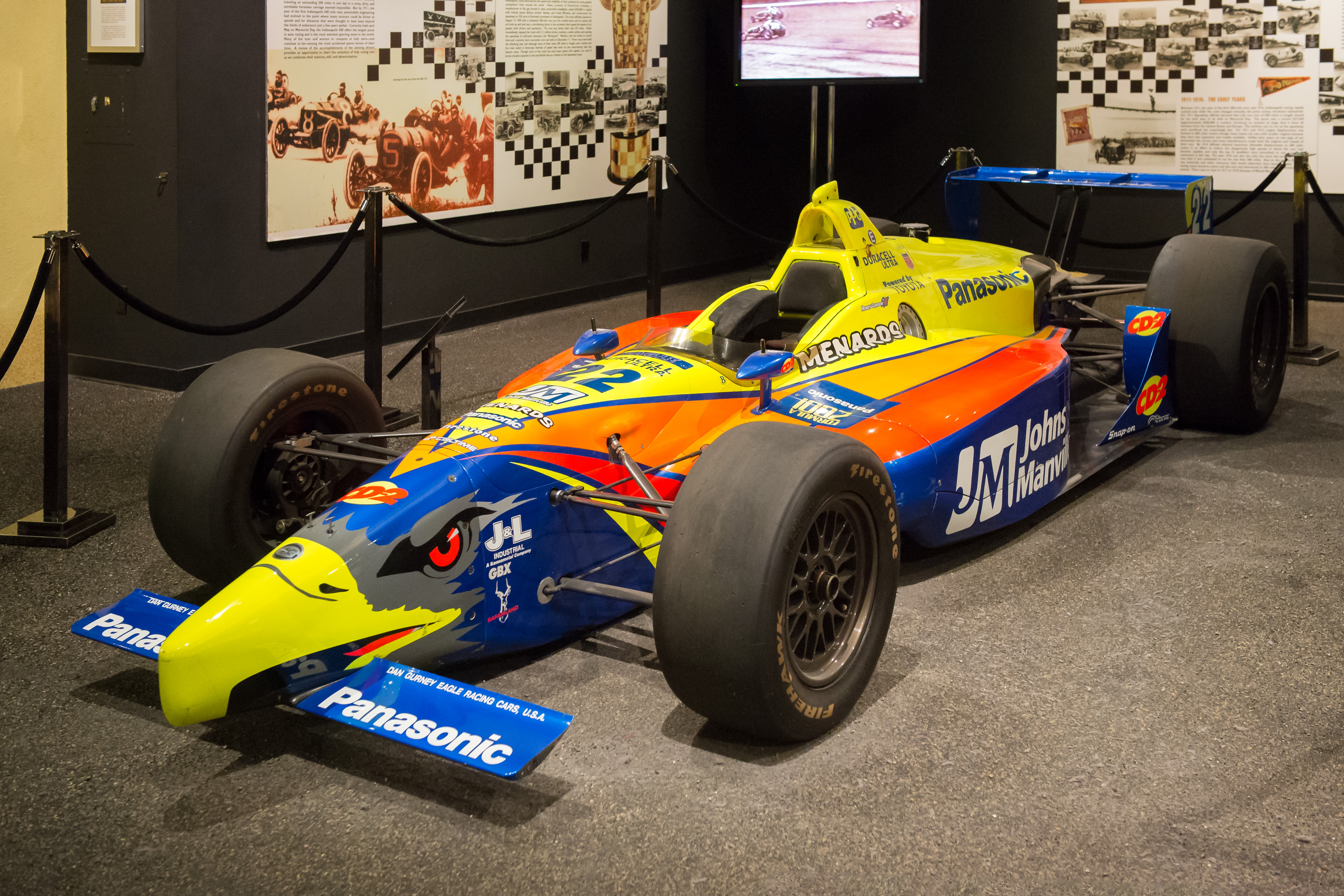
Gordon's Eagle 997 he drove for the 1999 CART season

Gordon's first start in the CART IndyCar series came in 1992. His first full season and Indy 500 start would come in 1993 with A. J. Foyt's team. He raced for Derrick Walker from 1994 to 1996. With Walker, he captured his first career pole in 1994 (Toronto), and both his CART career wins in 1995 (Phoenix and Detroit). For 1999, Gordon fielded his own team in the series with little success as the Toyota power the team used was still sub-par in performance.

Gordon raced ten times in the Indy 500 from 1993 to 2004 fielding his own team in 1999, 2000 and 2004. He, along with John Andretti, Tony Stewart, Kurt Busch, Kyle Larson, and Katherine Legge are the only six drivers to race in the Coca-Cola 600 and Indy 500 in the same day. In 1999, Gordon came within one lap of winning the Indianapolis 500, driving his own car sponsored by John Menard. After racing hard all day, he was in the lead and trying to conserve enough fuel to finish the race without a final pit stop, but his fuel ran out coming out of turn 3 on the penultimate lap and he had to give up the lead to Sweden's Kenny Bräck.

During his time in open-wheel, Gordon earned a reputation as a tough and sometimes overly aggressive racer. According to Gordon, though his decision to leave open wheel was based largely on "safety concerns", significantly more plausible an explanation to Gordon's estrangement from top-tier opened-wheel racing in North America is directly attributable to a high-profile incident during the 1996 Grand Prix of Cleveland, where Gordon was evidenced to have exited his vehicle mid-race, after a mechanical failure, and while standing atop his car, Gordon kicked the Ford Motor Company logo on live national television. Gordon and Ford would not make amends until 2007, when Gordon's NASCAR team switched to the manufacturer.

In 2001, Gordon, following his departure from Morgan-McClure Motorsports, re-joined Foyt's team for the Indianapolis 500. The team was a joint venture between AJ Foyt Racing and Richard Childress. With the car, Gordon qualified on the front row and dominated early on before strategic pit stops shuffled him to mid-pack by the time the race was over. It was one of Gordon's best performances at the Indianapolis 500, and it later opened up the doors for Gordon to join Childress' Busch team later that year.

== Stock cars ==
Gordon made his debut in stock car racing in November 1990 at Atlanta Motor Speedway, driving for Junie Donlavey in the Automobile Racing Club of America season finale; he finished 21st, but turned heads by winning the pole for the event.

=== NASCAR ===
==== Cup Series ====
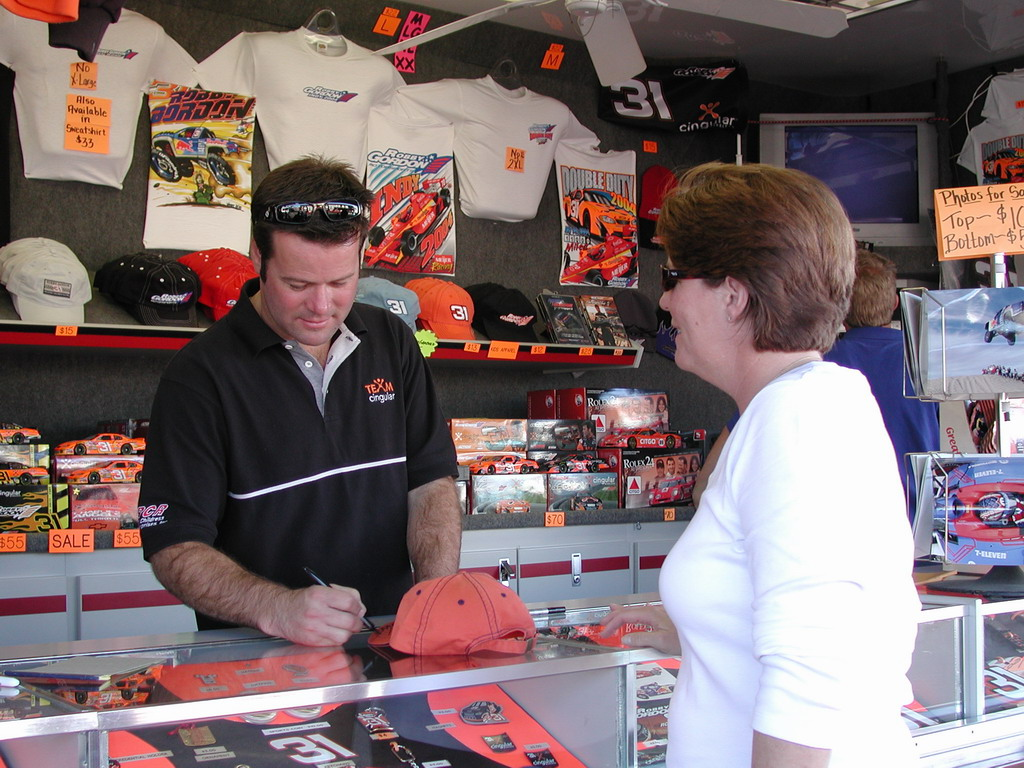
Gordon signing autographs at his souvenir trailer, a very common sight during most NASCAR weekends

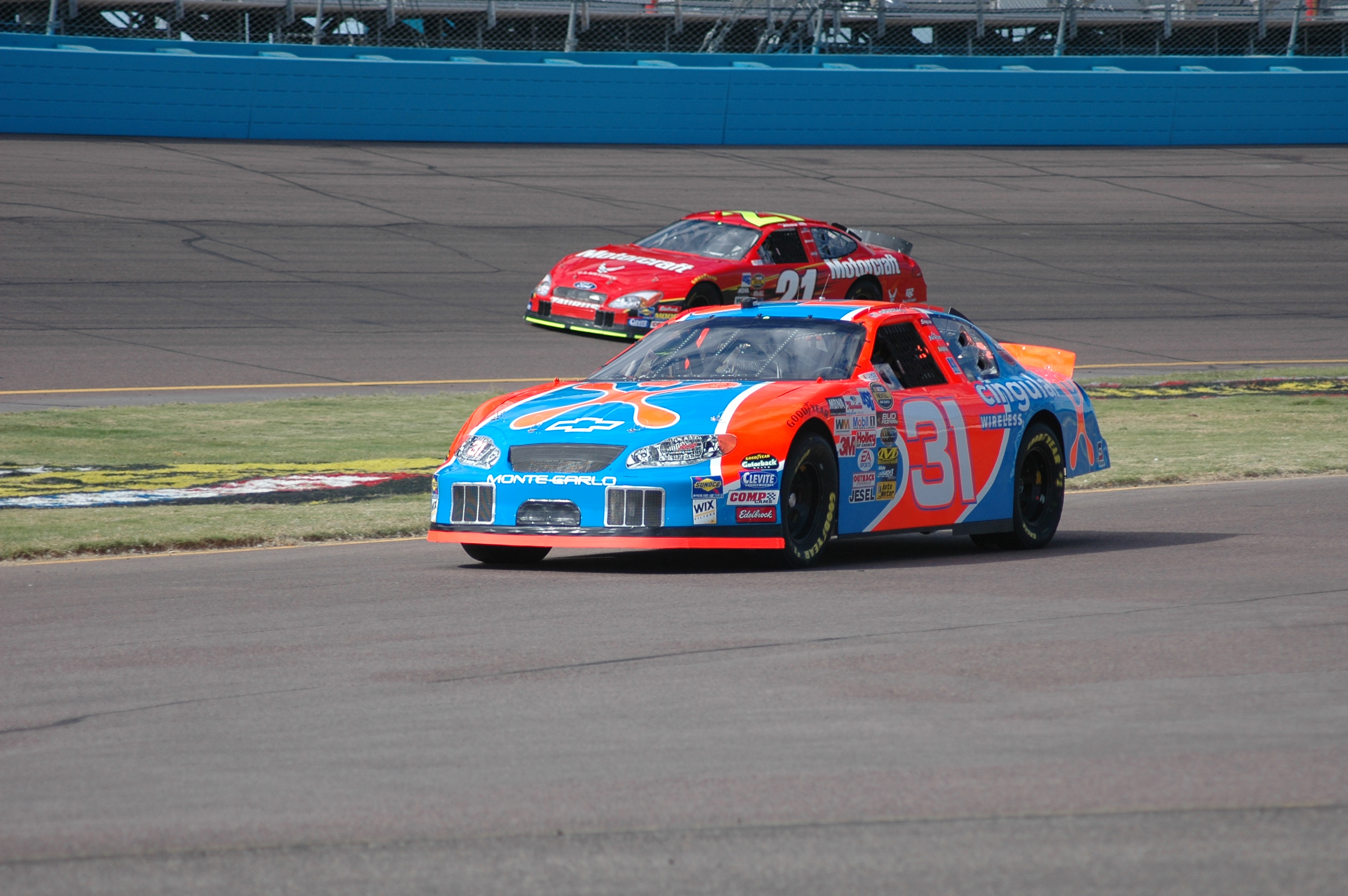
2004 racecar

Gordon's Winston Cup debut came in 1991, driving two races, including the Daytona 500 for Junie Donlavey in the No. 90 Ford. In 1993, Gordon drove the No. 28 Texaco-sponsored Ford for Robert Yates Racing at Talladega in the team's first race after the death of driver Davey Allison. In 1994, Gordon drove in one race for Michael Kranefuss starting and finishing 38th at Michigan. In 1996, Gordon raced at Charlotte in what was one of the first starts ever for Dale Earnhardt, Inc. He also raced at Rockingham and Phoenix for Felix Sabates. Gordon's first full-time ride came in 1997 with Felix Sabates' Team SABCO. Gordon raced in 22 starts with SABCO, and captured the pole at Atlanta. He also finished fourth at Watkins Glen, his only top-ten finish of the year. In 1998, Gordon ran only one race, in the No. 96 CAT car for Buz McCall, at Sears Point. He returned to NASCAR full-time in 2000, attempting to run his own team. Again, the results were disappointing; he failed to qualify for several races and finished with only two top-tens in seventeen starts.

Gordon started the 2001 season driving for Morgan-McClure Motorsports in the No. 4 Kodak-sponsored Chevrolet, but was replaced by Kevin Lepage after only five races. Gordon returned to racing in a one-off agreement with Ultra Motorsports, where he replaced the team's regular driver Mike Wallace in the No. 7 NationsRent-sponsored Ford for the June race at Sears Point. Gordon was leading that race near the end, but was passed by Tony Stewart, when Gordon repeatedly fought to hold off a lapped Kevin Harvick, which gave Stewart the chance to overtake Gordon and win the race.

Later in the same season, Gordon joined Richard Childress Racing as a replacement for an injured Mike Skinner. In the rescheduled season finale at New Hampshire, Gordon was engaged in a closing-laps battle with eventual champion Jeff Gordon (no relation). With 16 laps to go, leader Jeff Gordon (who ended up leading 257 of the 300 laps) was stuck behind the 12th place No. 77 car of Robert Pressley trying to stay on the lead lap, with Robby right on his tail. In the middle of turns three and four, Robby gave a bump to Jeff while he had slowed down to try and pass the lapped car of Mike Wallace, sending him into Wallace's No. 12 car and inflicting damage on the 24 car. Jeff was black flagged while attempting to retaliate under caution, and Robby went on to earn a controversial first career victory. The race, which had originally been scheduled for September, was postponed after the September 11 attacks, and after the event Gordon announced he would donate all his winnings to the victims of the 9/11 attacks.

Gordon continued to race for Richard Childress Racing in 2002. He crashed in the Daytona 500 and had a string of poor finishes in the spring. He performed well at Sonoma and led the most laps at Watkins Glen with 21 and finished third. He had a top-ten run at the Bank of America 500 but crashed in a ten-car pileup which also collected teammates Jeff Green and Kevin Harvick. Gordon finished twentieth in the final points standings, which was, at the time, his highest finishing position in his career.

In 2003, Gordon broke out and compiled his best season statistically. He finished sixth in the Daytona 500 and finished 10th in the Aaron's 499. He also led 29 laps at Richmond and finished fourth in the rain-shortened race. Then, he earned his first road course win at Infineon Raceway, after a controversial but legal pass under caution of his then-teammate, Kevin Harvick. Gordon continued running well during July, finishing seventh at Chicagoland, and then sixth at the 2003 Brickyard 400. Gordon took his third career win later in the year at Watkins Glen. He, Jeff Gordon, Tony Stewart, and Kyle Busch are the only drivers to win both road course events (at Infineon Raceway and Watkins Glen) in one season since the two became part of the current Sprint Cup schedule. Part of the reason for Gordon's success in 2003 was his pairing with Kevin Hamlin, a veteran crew chief. Despite his success with Hamlin, RCR replaced Hamlin with crew chief Chris Andrews for 2004.

2004 was a big disappointment after the 2003 campaign. With Andrews, Robby Gordon had a string of races in which he finished at the back of the field. His first top-ten finish of the season was the spring race in Darlington, and then had a series of DNF's. His best races, as expected, were at the road course races and the restrictor-plate races. He led 22 laps at Talladega before finishing fifth, and then led sixteen laps at Watkins Glen, racing Tony Stewart for the win late in the race. He then was involved in a controversial incident with Greg Biffle at Loudon that led to NASCAR slapping the No. 31 team with a two-lap penalty, a $15,000 fine and a 50-point deduction in the point standings, and also led to the team putting Gordon on probation.

While having a bad Cup Season in 2004, Robby Gordon and John Menard restarted their own Busch Series team, Robby Gordon Motorsports, in which they fielded the single No. 55 Fruit-of-the-Loom-sponsored Chevrolet, supplied by Earnhardt-Childress Racing Engines. The No. 55 Busch Series team, which competed in 25 of the 34 scheduled races, performed so dramatically well, that Robby and Menard decided to field the team in Cup for 2005. Despite Richard Childress asking Gordon to stay on RCR, Gordon announced in late 2004 that he would be operating his own Nextel Cup team, the No. 7 Jim Beam-sponsored Chevrolet.

For 2005, Gordon moved his Busch Series team up to the Nextel Cup, and was the only owner/driver left. Gordon's primary sponsor was Jim Beam Bourbon; his crew chief was originally Bob Temple before he was replaced by Greg Erwin. Fruit of the Loom was the primary sponsor for nine races in the 2005 season. His friend John Menard had his hardware corporation, Menards also become sponsors, as well as Harrah's. Gordon again struggled as an owner/driver, finishing with only two top-tens in 29 starts and failing to qualify for several races.

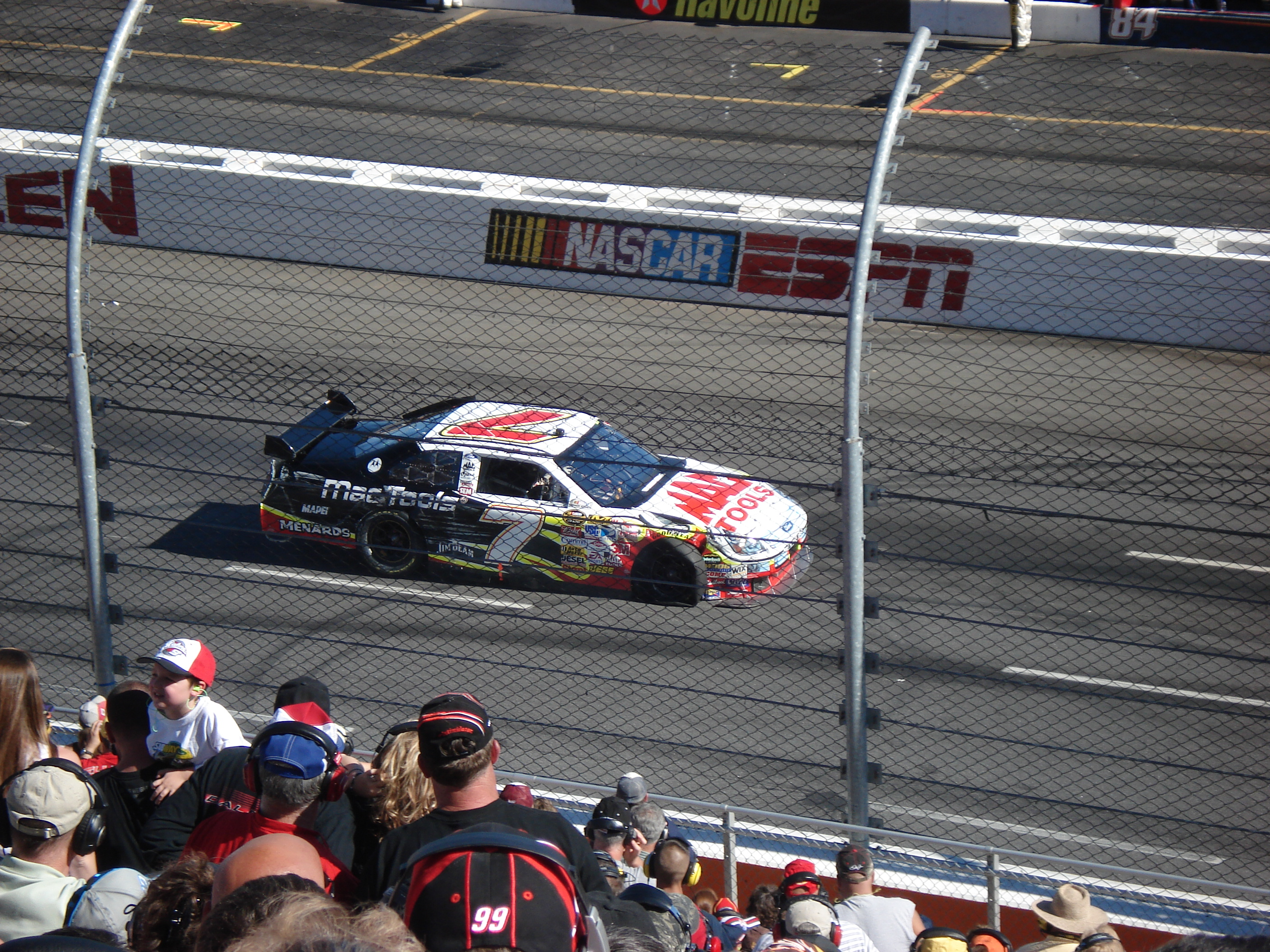
Gordon racing at Martinsville in October 2007.

In 2006, Gordon's team used engines from Dale Earnhardt, Inc., and showed slight improvement over the previous year's performance over the first few races. He performed well at Sonoma and Watkins Glen, qualifying and finishing in the top-ten in both races. For the 2007 season, Gordon switched to the Ford Fusion, with engines supplied from Roush-Yates. He started his season with a fifteenth-place finish in the 2007 Daytona 500, and picked up a few top-ten finishes, before he had a break-out race at Sears Point in which he qualified second, led a race-high 48 laps, and finished sixteenth. He had two top-tens by year's end, and finished 26th in points.

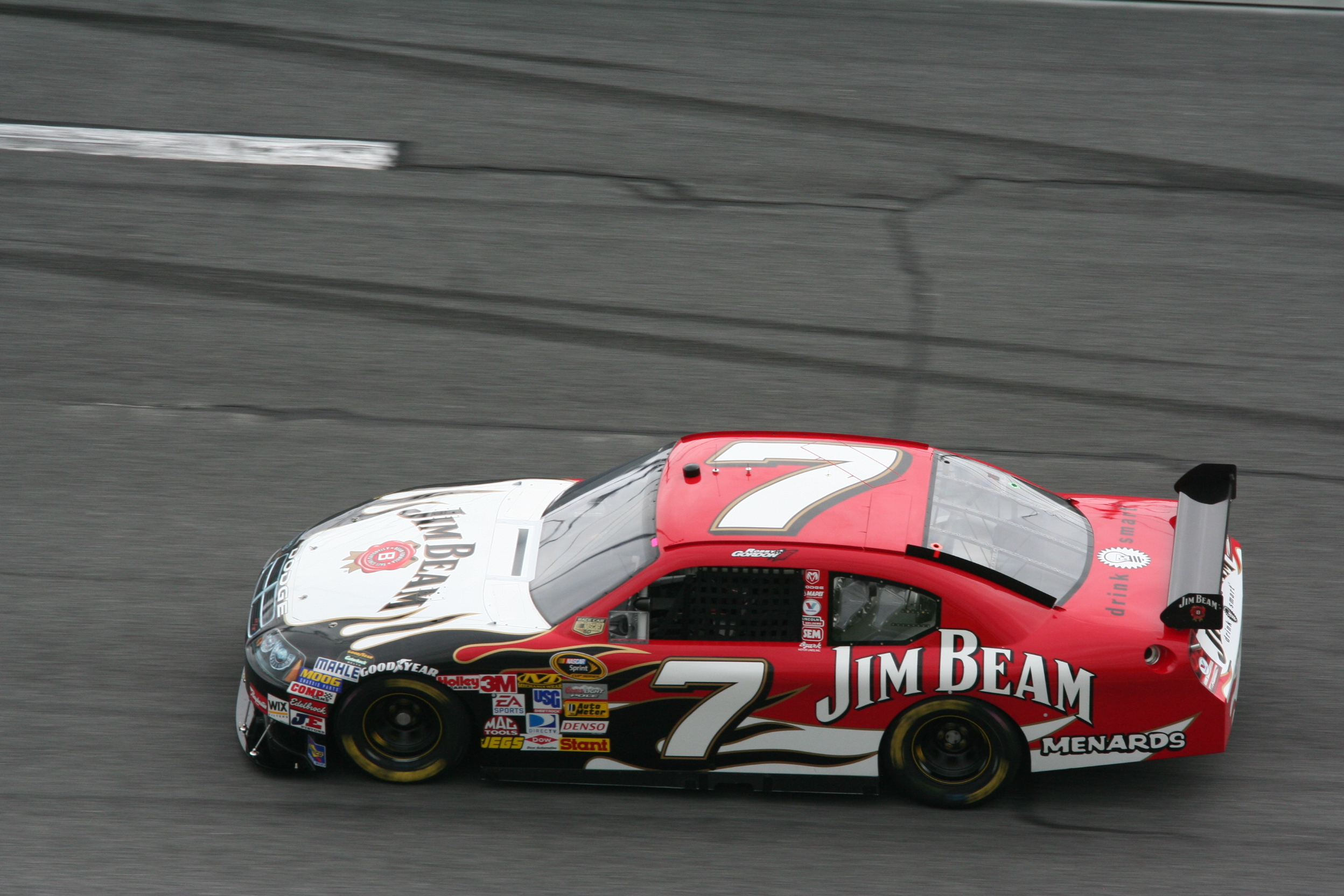
2008 racecar

On February 1, 2008, Gordon said he would go to Dodge in 2008, marking his fourth change in as many years. He also announced a technical, manufacturing and marketing services agreement with Gillett Evernham Motorsports. After dropping to 33rd in points, Gordon announced he would be running Toyotas in 2009, which would be his fifth change in as many years.

Gordon competed in fewer races in 2010, as Jim Beam did not renew its contract. In October, he founded Speed Energy as a means to generate funding for RGM. The team finished 34th in 2009 owner's standings. In January 2010, Gordon formed an alliance with BAM Racing, his sixth change in six years. In 2010, with Ted Musgrave driving, his team failed to qualify at Pocono, the first time since the 2005 race at Texas. He performed well at Sonoma in the Toyota Save Mart 350 and ended up second to Jimmie Johnson, which secured some part-time sponsorship for RGM. A penalty involving another team moved the No. 7 back into the top-35. Due to a commitment in Argentina, Bobby Labonte drove the No. 7 at Loudon. P. J. Jones and Kevin Conway have also shared the No. 7; Gordon entered a No. 07 car for a number of races.

Gordon secured a sponsorship to compete in the 2012 Daytona 500, but poor performance resulted in Gordon racing only at Phoenix and the road-course race at Sonoma. He failed to qualify for early-season races at Las Vegas and Fontana. At that point, sponsorship money dried up, and Gordon's team made no further starts in 2012. By 2013, Gordon's NASCAR career ended, as he was unable to attract sponsorship for any more NASCAR seasons. The No. 7 was taken by Dave Blaney of Tommy Baldwin Racing. In 2013, Gordon officially closed his NASCAR team in Charlotte and changed his shop to form the Stadium Super Truck series.

==== Nationwide Series ====
Gordon's first Busch Series experience came in 2001 when he ran three races for Richard Childress Racing in the No. 21 Rockwell Automation Chevrolet. His best finish was fifth at Watkins Glen International.

In 2004, after a four-year hiatus, Gordon and longtime partner John Menard, Jr., started their own program, Robby Gordon Motorsports, letting Gordon return to team ownership for the first time since their failed Cup team in 2000. The primary sponsor was Fruit-of-the-Loom, and the team was supplied by Richard Childress Racing, Gordon's Cup team at the time. The brand-new team selected the No. 55 and Gordon would drive in 25 NBS races. With the No. 55, Gordon earned numerous top-ten finishes, nearly won the restrictor plate Busch races that year, and earned one win which came at Richmond in the No. 55 Fruit-of-the-Loom Chevrolet. From 2004 to 2010 drivers that have driven for Robby Gordon Motorsports included P. J. Jones, Bobby Labonte, David Gilliland, Kevin Conway, Scott Wimmer, Reed Sorenson and Johnny Sauter. The No. 55 performed so tremendously well that, even though the original plans for 2005 was to run a full Busch Series season, Gordon chose to move the team up to the Cup Series with support from Ultra Motorsports owner Jim Smith. In 2005, Robby Gordon Motorsports participated in four Busch Series Races with two races being on the road courses in Mexico City, and Watkins Glen, and two being on oval tracks. The primary sponsor of the team for 2005 was Red Bull Energy Drink, although Red Bull would depart at year's end.

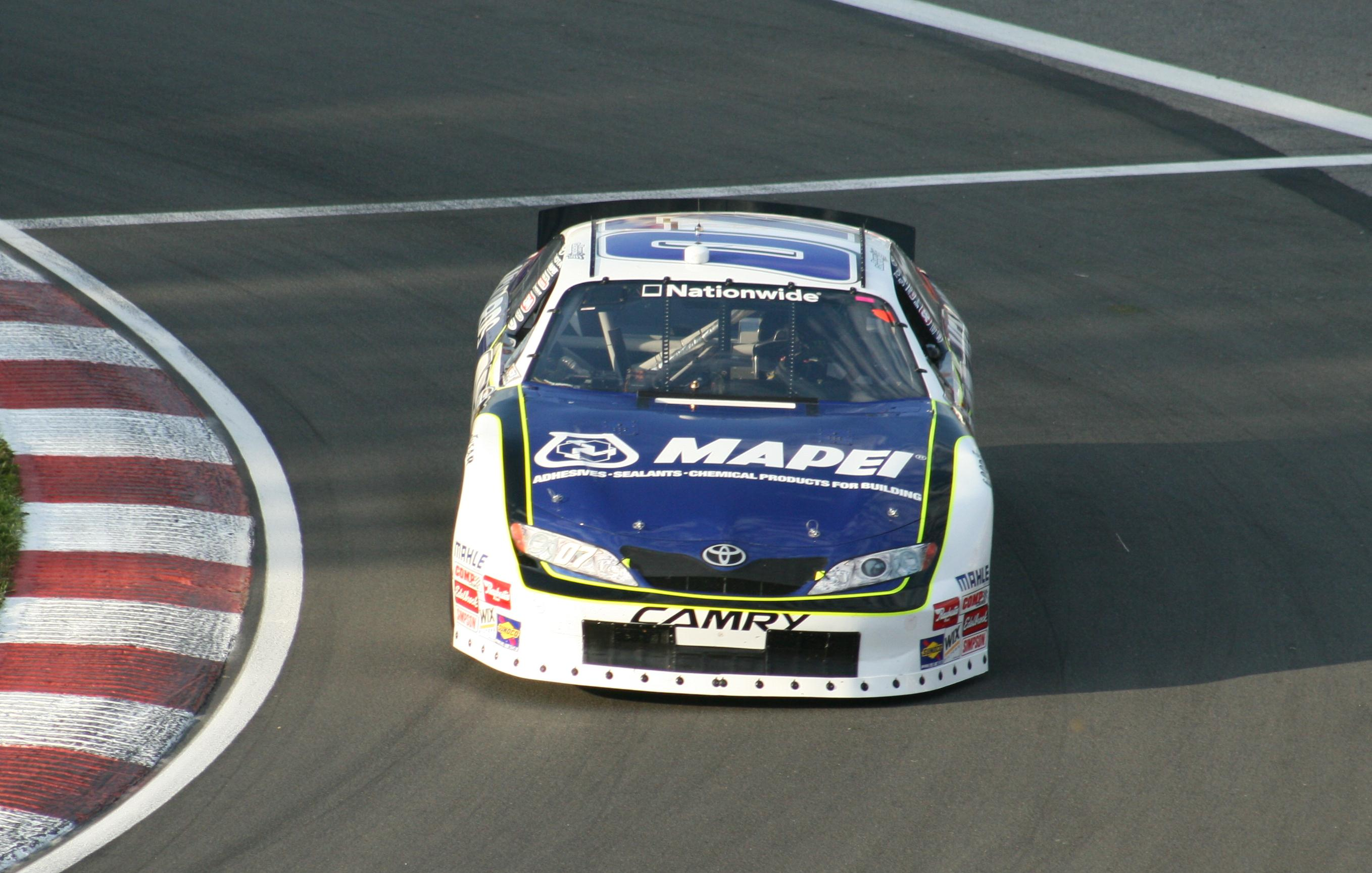
Gordon in the qualification for the 2010 NAPA Auto Parts 200 at Circuit Gilles Villeneuve in Montreal.

Gordon participated in several Busch races in 2006, including a few for Dale Earnhardt Jr.'s Nationwide team (JR Motorsports). The most notable highlight of his season was a thrilling second-place finish at Watkins Glen on August 12. Driving his own No. 7 Chevy, Gordon went door-to-door with Kurt Busch, driver of the No. 39 car for Penske South Racing, for the final few laps. Gordon gained ground in the chicane, almost catching Busch. The two cars went wildly into the grass and dirt, almost wrecking each other. Gordon was able to save his car, as Busch went down the final straightaway to win the race. While being interviewed in victory lane, Busch gave Gordon praise for a great race and said it reminded him of his race with Ricky Craven at Darlington in 2003.

In 2007, Gordon only had a few top tens in the NBS and came near to a win at Montreal before being disqualified by NASCAR for ignoring a penalty. He was further in trouble when he reacted to the penalty by intentionally crashing Marcos Ambrose to retaliate for a previous crash – an action that denied Ambrose (who dominated the race) the win and got Gordon suspended from the Sprint Cup Race at Pocono the next day. A backup driver and one of Gordon's friends, P. J. Jones took over for Gordon upon his suspension. Gordon, to make up for the incident, gave Ambrose a free race for RGM at Watkins Glen International the next weekend to make his first Sprint Cup start but because of rain, Ambrose did not qualify. Gordon, his sponsors and fans have said to this day that he won the 2007 NAPA 200 but nonetheless have accepted the penalty. In 2010, Gordon announced that he made himself a banner and makeshift trophy similar to the NAPA 200 trophy saying he won the 2007 NAPA 200 and when asked by reporters about how he was going to recover in 2010's Montreal race Gordon chuckled and said "You mean since I won? We've still got the banner hanging on our wall. We came back for redemption, and we'll do the best job we can."

On March 28, 2008, Gordon and the No. 22 Supercuts Dodge Team of Fitz Motorsports joined forces for a part-time schedule in the NASCAR Nationwide Series after driver Mike Bliss left the team to drive the No. 1 Chevrolet owned by James Finch. As of the press release Gordon is slated to drive both the Phoenix and Texas Nationwide Series events in the No. 22 car.

While driving part-time for Fitz, Gordon also drove a couple races for RGM. Gordon drove his No. 55 Mapei/Menards Dodge in the Chicagoland Race in July. He also started the Watkins Glen race in his No. 55 Jim Beam Dodge in 2nd place and finished in nineteenth position.

In 2009, Gordon cut his Busch season to just one single race, at Watkins Glen. There, he drove his No. 55 Hard-Rock Hotel car at the 2009 Zippo 200. Starting third, he was briefly in contention for the win, until he tangled with Joey Logano with seven laps to go. He finished fourteenth.

In 2010, Gordon drove the No. 07 Menards Toyota in the Nationwide series at Montreal as part of his alliance with John Menard for RGM. It was the first time since 2007 that he drove at Montreal due to his altercation with Marcos Ambrose (see below) due to having made amends by skipping the next races at the track. He dominated the last twenty laps of the race but ran out of fuel with two laps to go handing the win to colleague veteran Boris Said and resulted in the top-twenty in the finish.

In 2011, Gordon drove his No. 77 Mapei car at Montreal. He led five laps but broke down from engine failure, finishing 31st.

==== Craftsman Truck Series ====
Gordon has run four career Craftsman Truck Series races with one top-five and two top-ten finishes. He has run for Team SABCO, Bobby Hamilton Racing, and Morgan-Dollar Motorsports.

== Other racing ==
Gordon competed twice in the Race of Champions, first in 2001 in Gran Canaria, where he broke the lap time record. In 2014, Gordon competed in the Nations Cup for Team Americas alongside 2014 World Touring Car champion José María López.

In May 2017, while the Stadium Super Trucks were at Barbagallo Raceway in Perth, Gordon made his Aussie Racing Cars debut. He shared the No. 57 car with fellow SST driver Sheldon Creed; the car was usually run by Bill Hynes, but Hynes wished to focus on SST. Gordon finished eighth after starting last.

== Controversies ==
The first of Gordon’s many career controversies came in the 2001 New Hampshire 300 which was postponed due to the 9/11 terrorist attacks. Jeff Gordon had clinched the 2001 Cup championship the previous week at Atlanta, and this was to be the final race of the season. Robby made the majority of starts in the #31 Richard Childress Racing car after Mike Skinner retired for the rest of the season due to injuries sustained at Chicagoland (Skinner had also been injured earlier in the season at Richmond). With sixteen laps to go, Jeff Gordon was leading and hoping to close his championship season with another win. However, Robby drove up to second place in an impressive outing after he failed to qualify for the previous race. He gained the lead after bumping the rear end of the 24 car as he slowed to avoid lapped cars ahead of them. This led to Jeff’s car sliding up the race track into Mike Wallace and spinning him out thus bringing out the yellow flag. In retaliation, Jeff drove up to Robby’s car under the caution and attempted to cut down one of his tires. His first attempt failed, and before he could make a second he was black flagged by race officials. Jeff served a one lap penalty and ultimately finished in 15th while Robby went on to score his first career Cup Series win. This win earned Robby a contract with RCR to drive the 31 car beyond the 2001 season. Jeff, when interviewed post race, maintained that he should not have been penalized and that Robby should be embarrassed to have won the way he did. In response, Robby said that Jeff should be embarrassed of his retaliation.

In the 2003 Dodge/Save Mart 350, Gordon was eager to try for his second cup win in the No. 31 RCR Chevrolet. Prior to the race, Gordon was vomiting from food poisoning yet still ended Jeff Gordon's streak of domination at Sonoma for six years by dominating the race. Coming to the caution with 38 laps to go, Robby Gordon took advantage of his teammate and friend, Kevin Harvick by passing Harvick in turn 11 under caution and in the final laps was able to hold off Jeff Gordon for his second cup win in the No. 31 RCR team and his first cup win on a road course. Harvick ultimately finished 3rd. His pass under caution was ridiculed by Jeff Gordon, Kevin Harvick, and several other drivers because while the pass was legal it was considered "ungentlemanly". However, Robby Gordon was declared the winner and, in response to the criticism he received from Jeff Gordon, said "He's won enough of these things, and I guess he doesn't like it when someone else rains on his parade." This comment led NASCAR to issue warnings to Robby and Jeff with the instruction to resolve their differences.

A few days before the 2005 Daytona 500, NASCAR penalized ten race teams with Gordon's new No. 7 team among them. His crew chief Bob Temple was fined $50,000 and Robby was deducted 25 driver & owner points for an illegal unapproved installation on his car. Gordon failed to qualify for the race.

During the 2005 running of the Sylvania 300, Gordon was involved in a wreck with Michael Waltrip, the driver of the No. 15 NAPA Chevrolet. The angered Gordon got out of his totaled car and threw his helmet at the No. 15 car as it was passing by. Tony Stewart's No. 20 missed the helmet just seconds after it hit Waltrip's car. When TNT interviewed him about the crash, he stated "You know Michael, everybody thinks Michael's a good guy. He's not the good guy like he actually is. The caution was out and he wrecked me and he's a piece of shit." TNT apologized for his language, and though Gordon apologized after the race he was fined $50,000 and docked fifty drivers points. When asked by some people for the helmet, Gordon decided to auction it for the benefit of the Harrah's Employee Relief Fund, a fund that provides aid to Harrah's employees displaced by Hurricane Katrina. The helmet fetched $51,100, and was purchased by GoldenPalace.com.

During the 2006 Bass Pro Shops 500, Gordon brought controversy by allegedly throwing roll bar padding onto the track at Atlanta Motor Speedway, drawing a caution flag that had a significant impact for the end of the race, especially drivers on pit road, most notably NEXTEL Cup contender Jeff Burton who wound up finishing thirteenth. Video from the race was not conclusive as to whether he did in fact put debris on the track but NASCAR penalized him fifty owners and drivers points and issued him a $15,000 fine. Gordon has denied he intentionally threw the debris.

During the inaugural NAPA Auto Parts 200 at Circuit Gilles Villeneuve in 2007, Gordon was involved in an on-circuit altercation with fellow driver Marcos Ambrose. Gordon passed Ambrose to take the lead at the same time as a multi-car wreck was unfolding behind them; Ambrose spun him, under a yellow flag, to reclaim it seconds later. After an unusually long delay in sorting out the field for the restart, NASCAR eventually determined that Gordon would restart in thirteenth position. Gordon, who had a strong race all day, refused to go to that position, and was black flagged after the restart. After spinning out Ambrose. Gordon did not come in for his penalty and was then given the black flag with diagonal white cross, which meant that his remaining laps would not count. As a result, he finished eighteenth. Following the race, Gordon proceeded to do burnouts on the front straightaway as if celebrating his victory alongside race winner Kevin Harvick. He announced in a post-race interview that he would appeal the result of the race. However, NASCAR suspended Gordon for the following race at Pocono. In a statement released soon after the NASCAR announcement, Gordon apologized for his actions but maintained that NASCAR made a mistake in telling him to line up in the 13th position.

Gordon was docked 100 driver and owner points as a result of rule infractions during Speedweeks of 2008 at Daytona. Gordon's car was found with an unapproved front bumper cover. His crew chief Frank Kerr was suspended for six weeks until April 9, 2008, fined $100,000 and placed on probation until December 31, 2008. Gordon was not fined. Gordon appealed the penalty issued by NASCAR in February, 2008. Gordon issued a press statement. "This was an innocent mistake made by someone not even on our race team. They accidentally sent us the new Dodge noses that haven't yet been approved by NASCAR." According to NASCAR Gordon's Dodge nose says Charger, but it is actually an Avenger and it had the approved nose's part number. On March 5, 2008, the National Stock Car Racing Commission restored the points lost in the penalty and rescinded the suspension of crew chief Kerr. In their ruling, the commission also increased the fine to $150,000.

Gordon's off-road finishes have also been the source of controversy. His second place finish in the San Felipe 250, March 2009, was overshadowed by allegations that in a very remote area he veered off course and drove down a cliff. The maneuver let him bypass a difficult section of the course and get ahead of another competitor without having to pass in what was essentially a four-mile shortcut. Trophy Truck competitor Ed Herbst filed a protest, which was supported by evidence from a pit crew known as the Baja Fools who had set up a pit stop in that section of the course. On investigation, two sets of Toyo tire tracks (identical to those on Gordon's truck) were found which established the four-mile shortcut. The protest was denied based on the fact that given Gordon's average speed, the four-mile shortcut would not have changed the results. After initially filing an appeal of the decision, Herbst, who shared a sponsor with Gordon, elected to withdraw the appeal and the results were deemed final.

Likewise, Gordon was initially declared the winner of the 2009 Baja 500 on June 6, 2009. However, he was stripped of the title and moved to seventh place after it was determined that he violated two rules: one a fueling violation, the other a highway speed violation. A total of 100 minutes in penalties were assessed: 90 minutes for the more serious fueling violation where an amateur video proved that he illegally received fuel on the highway, and 10 minutes for the speed violation.

Gordon's troubles with NASCAR rules continued in 2009. He was caught with excessive rear toe (angle of the wheels to the car) after the May 27, 2009 Coca-Cola 600 at the Charlotte Motor Speedway. This illegal adjustment permits the car to carry more speed into the corner. Gordon was docked fifty points and his crew chief was fined $50,000. Gordon elected not to appeal the infraction.

In 2010, Gordon’s car found to have illegal parts during inspection on May 7, 2010 before a race at Darlington Raceway. Gordon was docked 25 owner points and 25 driver points. His crew chief, Samuel Stanley was fined $25,000 and placed on NASCAR probation for the rest of the year. This fine brought Gordon's five year total to $290,000 paid to NASCAR.

On March 4, 2011, Gordon was placed on indefinite probation in NASCAR due to an altercation he had with driver Kevin Conway in the garage area the night before. According to published reports, the two were involved in a scuffle over lawsuits each had filed against the other. Las Vegas police confirmed that Conway filed a criminal complaint charging Gordon with misdemeanor battery.

After the August 2011 Bristol race, Gordon admitted that he is now a "start and park" driver and will do so for most of the remainder of the season. "Start and park" is a controversial practice whereby a driver starts the race but then immediately parks his car so he can collect the last place prize money and protect his car from any on-track incidents. At Bristol, Gordon completed only 10 laps but pocketed $85,960.

Although in 2012, Gordon made remarks against past-champion Terry Labonte for "starting and parking" after twelve laps at the Daytona 500 qualifying race. As a past champion whose team was not in the top-35 in 2011 owner's points, Labonte was guaranteed a start regardless of how he finished. Gordon stated: "It's just not right. Why take a free ride when the rest of us have to bust our butts to get into the 500?" Labonte responded that his team had only one car and they needed it for the race.

Controversy continued to plague Gordon in 2012. While participating in the Dakar Rally, Gordon was running a strong second after nine stages before being disqualified after stewards ruled that the tire inflation system on his Hummer was illegal after another competitor made an anonymous suggestion to the tech inspectors along the rally route, where it was called into question. Gordon stated that if there was a problem with the system, he would plug it and still win stages. He did so the following day, winning the stage by more than fifteen minutes in front of the second place finisher. Gordon was permitted to continue while the ruling was appealed to the French Automobile Sport Federation (FFSA). Gordon's Hummer crashed and rolled over in the sand dunes of Peru in the penultimate stage of the rally (January 14, 2012), but was set back on its wheels by spectators and Gordon continued on to a tenth place finish of that stage. He then won the final stage the following day, finishing the rally in fifth place overall. The appeal to the FFSA was denied two months later. After Gordon's disqualification was upheld, he was stricken from the race results.

== Personal life ==
Throughout his racing career, Gordon preferred to keep his private life private, and shared few details about his personal life. Though he has never married, he has a son, Max Gordon, from a previous relationship. In 2016, eight-year-old Max competed in a UTV at the Bluewater Desert Challenge with Gordon as his co-driver; later in the year, he became the youngest driver to ever compete and finish the Baja 1000. At the age of twelve, Max raced against his father in the Stadium Super Trucks race at Road America in 2020.

In addition to Speed Energy, Gordon owns various companies under the Speed umbrella such as the UTV manufacturer Speed UTV, remote-control off-road truck brand Speed RC Cars, and racing tool maker Speed Tools. Gordon co-operates Speed UTV with Todd Romano with consultation from Gordon's former engine builder Tony Cola; the brand's vehicles receive inspiration from SST and IndyCar. Speed RC Cars has appeared as a sponsor in SST for drivers like Max.

== Significant victories ==
- 7 SCORE International championships (1986–90, 1996, 2009)
- 3 time Baja 1000 winner (1987, 1989, 2006)
- 4 time Baja 500 winner (1989, 1990, 2005, 2013)
- 9 Dakar Rally stage victories
- 4 time 24 Hours of Daytona winner
- 3 time 12 Hours of Sebring winner
- 3 NASCAR Winston Cup Series wins (New Hampshire 2001, Infineon and Watkins Glen 2003)
- 1 NASCAR Winston Cup Gatorade 125 Win (2003)
- 1 NASCAR Busch Series win (Richmond 2004)
- 2 CART wins (Phoenix and Detroit 1995)
- 1 2008 Central Europe Rally Special wins (Stage 5 Scratch 1 winner (1/2 stage) Hummer)

== Racing record ==
=== NASCAR ===
(key) (Bold – Pole position awarded by qualifying time. Italics – Pole position earned by points standings or practice time. * – Most laps led.)

==== Sprint Cup Series ====
NASCAR Sprint Cup Series results
| Year | Team | No. | Make | 1 | 2 | 3 | 4 | 5 | 6 | 7 | 8 | 9 | 10 | 11 | 12 | 13 | 14 | 15 | 16 | 17 | 18 | 19 | 20 | 21 | 22 | 23 | 24 | 25 | 26 | 27 | 28 | 29 | 30 | 31 | 32 | 33 | 34 | 35 | 36 | NSCC | Pts | Ref |
|---|---|---|---|---|---|---|---|---|---|---|---|---|---|---|---|---|---|---|---|---|---|---|---|---|---|---|---|---|---|---|---|---|---|---|---|---|---|---|---|---|---|---|
| 1991 | Donlavey Racing | 90 | Ford | DAY; 18 | RCH; 26 | CAR | ATL | DAR | BRI | NWS | MAR | TAL | CLT | DOV | SON | POC | MCH | DAY | POC | TAL | GLN | MCH | BRI | DAR | RCH | DOV | MAR | NWS | CLT | CAR | PHO | ATL | | | | | | | | 55th | 194 | |
| 1993 | Robert Yates Racing | 28 | Ford | DAY | CAR | RCH | ATL | DAR | BRI | NWS | MAR | TAL | SON | CLT | DOV | POC | MCH | DAY | NHA | POC | TAL; 42 | GLN | MCH | BRI | DAR | RCH | DOV | MAR | NWS | CLT | CAR | PHO | ATL | | | | | | | 93rd | 37 | |
| 1994 | Kranefuss-Haas Racing | 07 | Ford | DAY | CAR | RCH | ATL | DAR | BRI | NWS | MAR | TAL | SON | CLT | DOV | POC | MCH; 38 | DAY | NHA | POC | TAL | IND | GLN | MCH | BRI | DAR | RCH | DOV | MAR | NWS | CLT | CAR | PHO | ATL | | | | | | 76th | 49 | |
| 1996 | Dale Earnhardt Inc. | 14 | Chevy | DAY | CAR | RCH | ATL | DAR | BRI | NWS | MAR | TAL | SON | CLT | DOV | POC | MCH | DAY | NHA | POC | TAL | IND | GLN | MCH | BRI | DAR | RCH | DOV | MAR | NWS | CLT; 38 | | | | | | | | | 57th | 123 | |
| 1996 | Team SABCO | 40 | Chevy | | | | | | | | | | | | | | | | | | | | | | | | | | | | | CAR; 42 | PHO; 42 | ATL | | | | | | 57th | 123 | |
| 1997 | Team SABCO | 40 | Chevy | DAY; 16 | CAR; 33 | RCH; 28 | **ATL**; 14 | DAR; 34 | TEX; 34 | BRI; 43 | MAR; 41 | SON; 41 | TAL; QL^{†} | CLT; 41 | DOV | POC | MCH | CAL | DAY; 22 | NHA; 34 | POC; 42 | IND; 28 | GLN; 4 | MCH; 17 | BRI; DNQ | DAR; 22 | RCH; 42 | NHA; 24 | DOV; 33 | MAR | CLT | TAL | CAR | PHO | ATL | | | | | 40th | 1495 | |
| 1998 | American Equipment Racing | 96 | Chevy | DAY | CAR | LVS | ATL | DAR | BRI | TEX | MAR | TAL | CAL | CLT | DOV | RCH | MCH | POC | SON; 36 | NHA | POC | | | | | | | | | | | | | | | | | | | 67th | 57 | |
| 1998 | Roehrig Motorsports | 19 | Ford | | | | | | | | | | | | | | | | | | | IND; DNQ | GLN | MCH | BRI | NHA | DAR | RCH | DOV | MAR | CLT | TAL | DAY | PHO | CAR | ATL | | | | 67th | 57 | |
| 2000 | Team Menard | 13 | Ford | DAY; 18 | CAR; 38 | LVS; 13 | ATL; DNQ | DAR; 28 | BRI; 32 | TEX; DNQ | MAR; 40 | TAL; 37 | CAL; 31 | RCH; 37 | CLT | DOV | MCH; 28 | POC | SON; 9 | DAY; DNQ | NHA | POC | IND; DNQ | GLN; 4 | MCH; 34 | BRI; 31 | DAR | RCH; DNQ | NHA | DOV | MAR | CLT; 38 | TAL | CAR; 41 | PHO; DNQ | HOM | ATL; 27 | | | 43rd | 1309 | |
| 2001 | Morgan-McClure Motorsports | 4 | Chevy | DAY; 37 | CAR; 26 | LVS; 34 | ATL; 20 | DAR; 29 | BRI | TEX | MAR | TAL | CAL | RCH | CLT | DOV | MCH | POC | | | | | | | | | | | | | | | | | | | | | | 44th | 1552 | |
| 2001 | Ultra Motorsports | 7 | Ford | | | | | | | | | | | | | | | | SON; 2 | DAY | CHI; 35 | | | | | | | | | | | | | | | | | | | 44th | 1552 | |
| 2001 | Richard Childress Racing | 31 | Chevy | | | | | | | | | | | | | | | | | | | NHA; 25 | POC; 28 | IND; 30 | GLN; 40 | MCH | BRI | DAR | RCH | DOV | KAN; 14 | CLT; DNQ | MAR; 38 | TAL; 19 | PHO; 7 | CAR; 37 | HOM | ATL; DNQ | NHA; 1 | 44th | 1552 | |
| 2002 | Richard Childress Racing | 31 | Chevy | DAY; 13 | CAR; 24 | LVS; 37 | ATL; 18 | DAR; 24 | BRI; 20 | TEX; 41 | MAR; 34 | TAL; 33 | CAL; 12 | RCH; 37 | CLT; 16 | DOV; 8 | POC; 19 | MCH; 33 | SON; 11 | DAY; 29 | CHI; 8 | NHA; 7 | POC; 25 | IND; 8 | GLN; 3 | MCH; 21 | BRI; 20 | DAR; 17 | RCH; 28 | NHA; 17 | DOV; 17 | KAN; 13 | TAL; 12 | CLT; 38 | MAR; 23 | ATL; 20 | CAR; 11 | PHO; 27 | HOM; 26 | 20th | 3632 | |
| 2003 | Richard Childress Racing | 31 | Chevy | DAY; 6 | CAR; 29 | LVS; 23 | ATL; 17 | DAR; 28 | BRI; 17 | TEX; 18 | TAL; 10 | MAR; 21 | CAL; 27 | RCH; 4 | CLT; 17 | DOV; 9 | POC; 28 | MCH; 22 | SON; 1* | DAY; 40 | CHI; 7 | NHA; 5 | POC; 18 | IND; 6 | GLN; 1* | MCH; 6 | BRI; 35 | DAR; 28 | RCH; 29 | NHA; 21 | DOV; 23 | TAL; 12 | KAN; 25 | CLT; 38 | MAR; 36 | ATL; 21 | PHO; 32 | CAR; 20 | HOM; 30 | 16th | 3856 | |
| 2004 | Richard Childress Racing | 31 | Chevy | DAY; 35 | CAR; 36 | LVS; 30 | ATL; 17 | DAR; 4 | BRI; 19 | TEX; 23 | MAR; 30 | TAL; 5 | CAL; 12 | RCH; 24 | CLT; 20 | DOV; 14 | POC; 8 | MCH; 33 | SON; 24 | DAY; 19 | CHI; 17 | NHA; 25 | POC; 7 | IND; 25 | GLN; 16 | MCH; 25 | BRI; 12 | CAL; 9 | RCH; 32 | NHA; 32 | DOV; 23 | TAL; 9 | KAN; 28 | CLT; 18 | MAR; 23 | ATL; 16 | PHO; 35 | DAR; 15 | HOM; 29 | 23rd | 3646 | |
| 2005 | Robby Gordon Motorsports | 7 | Chevy | DAY; DNQ | CAL; 35 | LVS; 39 | ATL; 34 | BRI; DNQ | MAR; 20 | TEX; 37 | PHO; 37 | TAL; DNQ | DAR; DNQ | RCH; 31 | CLT; 27 | DOV; 29 | POC; 39 | MCH; 39 | SON; 16 | DAY; 26 | CHI; 35 | NHA; 30 | POC; 40 | IND; 24 | GLN; 2 | MCH; 30 | BRI; 38 | CAL; 34 | RCH; 35 | NHA; 37 | DOV; 29 | TAL; 23 | KAN; DNQ | CLT; 32 | MAR; 41 | ATL; DNQ | TEX; DNQ | PHO; 8 | HOM; 14 | 37th | 2142 | |
| 2006 | Robby Gordon Motorsports | 7 | Chevy | DAY; 13 | CAL; 26 | LVS; 12 | ATL; 28 | BRI; 26 | MAR; 43 | TEX; 20 | PHO; 41 | TAL; 10 | RCH; 39 | DAR; 13 | CLT; 16 | DOV; 36 | POC; 35 | MCH; 18 | SON; 40 | DAY; 14 | CHI; 19 | NHA; 19 | POC; 13 | IND; 35 | GLN; 4 | MCH; 12 | BRI; 27 | CAL; 43 | RCH; 19 | NHA; 15 | DOV; 41 | KAN; 36 | TAL; 16 | CLT; 25 | MAR; 37 | ATL; 10 | TEX; 39 | PHO; 32 | HOM; 40 | 30th | 3113 | |
| 2007 | Robby Gordon Motorsports | 7 | Ford | DAY; 15 | CAL; 21 | LVS; 17 | ATL; 20 | BRI; 33 | MAR; 34 | TEX; 24 | PHO; 24 | TAL; 41 | RCH; 34 | DAR; 38 | CLT; 22 | DOV; 10 | POC; 41 | MCH; 13 | SON; 16* | NHA; 17 | DAY; 15 | CHI; 36 | IND; 27 | POC; QL^{‡} | GLN; 5 | MCH; 24 | BRI; 20 | CAL; 41 | RCH; 36 | NHA; 31 | DOV; 19 | KAN; 19 | TAL; 29 | CLT; 38 | MAR; 39 | ATL; 21 | TEX; 32 | PHO; 24 | HOM; 27 | 26th | 2770 | |
| 2008 | Robby Gordon Motorsports | 7 | Dodge | DAY; 8 | CAL; 18 | LVS; 42 | ATL; 24 | BRI; 24 | MAR; 40 | TEX; 30 | PHO; 29 | TAL; 11 | RCH; 26 | DAR; 33 | CLT; 43 | DOV; 19 | POC; 36 | MCH; 40 | SON; 36 | NHA; 26 | DAY; 6 | CHI; 25 | IND; 33 | POC; 37 | GLN; 27 | MCH; 37 | BRI; 39 | CAL; 40 | RCH; 42 | NHA; 26 | DOV; 22 | KAN; 37 | TAL; 8 | CLT; 30 | MAR; 40 | ATL; 19 | TEX; 36 | PHO; 28 | HOM; 26 | 33rd | 2770 | |
| 2009 | Robby Gordon Motorsports | 7 | Toyota | DAY; 34 | CAL; 30 | LVS; 15 | ATL; 26 | BRI; 21 | MAR; 40 | TEX; 39 | PHO; 39 | TAL; 29 | RCH; 16 | DAR; 28 | CLT; 3 | DOV; 33 | POC; 31 | MCH; 17 | SON; 36 | NHA; 25 | DAY; 22 | CHI; 34 | IND; 28 | POC; 33 | GLN; 18 | MCH; 37 | BRI; 32 | ATL; 16 | RCH | NHA; 24 | DOV; 34 | KAN; 34 | CAL; 38 | CLT; 30 | MAR; 37 | TAL; 32 | TEX; 27 | PHO; 22 | HOM; 39 | 34th | 2699 | |
| 2010 | Robby Gordon Motorsports | 7 | Toyota | DAY; 28 | CAL; 33 | LVS; 32 | ATL; 43 | BRI; 22 | MAR; 34 | PHO; 14 | TEX; 31 | TAL; 20 | RCH; 28 | DAR; 38 | DOV; 31 | CLT; 33 | POC | MCH; 33 | SON; 2 | NHA | DAY; 12 | CHI; 38 | IND; 36 | POC | GLN; 36 | | | | | NHA; 26 | DOV | KAN | CAL | CLT; 33 | MAR; 22 | TAL; 18 | TEX; 35 | PHO; 33 | HOM | 34th | 2028 | |
| 2010 | Robby Gordon Motorsports | 07 | Toyota | | | | | | | | | | | | | | | | | | | | | | | MCH; 39 | BRI; 40 | ATL | RCH | | | | | | MAR; DNQ | | | | | 34th | 2028 | |
| 2011 | Robby Gordon Motorsports | 7 | Dodge | DAY; 16 | PHO; 32 | LVS; 32 | BRI; 39 | CAL; 34 | MAR; 23 | TEX; 31 | TAL; 20 | RCH; 35 | DAR; 37 | DOV | CLT; 38 | KAN | POC | MCH; 37 | SON; 18 | DAY; 34 | | | IND; 43 | POC; 35 | GLN; 24 | MCH | BRI; 43 | ATL; 39 | RCH; 37 | CHI; 39 | NHA; 40 | DOV | KAN | CLT; 38 | TAL; 37 | MAR | TEX | PHO; 32 | HOM | 34th | 268 | |
| 2011 | Robby Gordon Motorsports | 77 | Dodge | | | | | | | | | | | | | | | | | | KEN; DNQ | NHA | | | | | | | | | | | | | | | | | | 34th | 268 | |
| 2012 | Robby Gordon Motorsports | 7 | Dodge | DAY; 41 | PHO; 41 | LVS; DNQ | BRI; Wth | CAL; DNQ | MAR | TEX | KAN | RCH | TAL | DAR | CLT | DOV | POC | MCH | SON; 39 | KEN | DAY | NHA | IND | POC | GLN | MCH | BRI | ATL | RCH | CHI | NHA | DOV | TAL | CLT | KAN | MAR | TEX | PHO | HOM | 52nd | 11 | |
^{†} - Qualified but replaced by Joe Nemechek · ^{‡} - Qualified but replaced by P. J. Jones

===== Daytona 500 =====
| Year | Team | Manufacturer | Start | Finish |
|---|---|---|---|---|
| 1991 | Donlavey Racing | Ford | 35 | 18 |
| 1997 | Team SABCO | Chevrolet | 20 | 16 |
| 2000 | Team Menard | Ford | 17 | 18 |
| 2001 | Morgan-McClure Motorsports | Chevrolet | 41 | 37 |
| 2002 | Richard Childress Racing | Chevrolet | 12 | 13 |
| 2003 | Richard Childress Racing | Chevrolet | 3 | 6 |
| 2004 | Richard Childress Racing | Chevrolet | 30 | 35 |
| 2005 | Robby Gordon Motorsports | Chevrolet | DNQ | |
| 2006 | Robby Gordon Motorsports | Chevrolet | 20 | 13 |
| 2007 | Robby Gordon Motorsports | Ford | 39 | 15 |
| 2008 | Robby Gordon Motorsports | Dodge | 26 | 8 |
| 2009 | Robby Gordon Motorsports | Toyota | 31 | 34 |
| 2010 | Robby Gordon Motorsports | Toyota | 34 | 28 |
| 2011 | Robby Gordon Motorsports | Dodge | 30 | 16 |
| 2012 | Robby Gordon Motorsports | Dodge | 17 | 41 |

==== Nationwide Series ====
NASCAR Nationwide Series results
| Year | Team | No. | Make | 1 | 2 | 3 | 4 | 5 | 6 | 7 | 8 | 9 | 10 | 11 | 12 | 13 | 14 | 15 | 16 | 17 | 18 | 19 | 20 | 21 | 22 | 23 | 24 | 25 | 26 | 27 | 28 | 29 | 30 | 31 | 32 | 33 | 34 | 35 | NNSC | Pts | Ref |
|---|---|---|---|---|---|---|---|---|---|---|---|---|---|---|---|---|---|---|---|---|---|---|---|---|---|---|---|---|---|---|---|---|---|---|---|---|---|---|---|---|---|
| 2001 | Richard Childress Racing | 21 | Chevy | DAY | CAR | LVS | ATL | DAR | BRI | TEX | NSH | TAL | CAL | RCH | NHA | NZH | CLT | DOV | KEN | MLW | GLN; 5 | CHI | GTY | PPR | IRP | MCH | BRI | DAR | RCH | DOV | KAN; 11 | CLT; 23 | MEM | PHO | CAR | HOM | | | 60th | 389 | |
| 2004 | Robby Gordon Motorsports | 55 | Chevy | DAY; 3 | CAR; 14 | LVS; 19 | DAR; 7 | BRI; 23 | TEX; 3 | NSH; 5 | TAL; 7 | CAL; 12 | GTY; 10 | RCH; 19 | NZH | CLT | DOV; 32 | NSH; 14 | KEN; 12 | MLW | DAY; 26 | CHI; 6 | NHA | PPR | IRP; 15 | MCH; 12 | BRI; 39 | CAL | RCH; 1 | DOV | KAN; 14 | CLT; 29 | MEM | ATL; 4 | PHO; 4 | DAR | HOM; 37 | | 21st | 3105 | |
| 2005 | Robby Gordon Motorsports | 55 | Chevy | DAY; 6 | CAL | | | | | | | | | | | | | | | | | | | | | | GLN; 2 | MCH | BRI | CAL | RCH | DOV | KAN | CLT; 31 | MEM | TEX | PHO | HOM | 78th | 395 | |
| 2005 | Robby Gordon Motorsports | 83 | Chevy | | | MXC; 40 | LVS | ATL | NSH | BRI | TEX | PHO | TAL | DAR | RCH | CLT | DOV | NSH | KEN | MLW | DAY | CHI | NHA | PPR | GTY | IRP | | | | | | | | | | | | | 78th | 395 | |
| 2006 | Robby Gordon Motorsports | 7 | Chevy | DAY | CAL | MXC | LVS | ATL | BRI | TEX | NSH | PHO | TAL | RCH | DAR | CLT; 40 | DOV | NSH | KEN | MLW | DAY | CHI | NHA | MAR | GTY | IRP | GLN; 2 | | | | | | | | | | | | 64th | 526 | |
| 2006 | JR Motorsports | 88 | Chevy | | | | | | | | | | | | | | | | | | | | | | | | | MCH; 3 | BRI | CAL; 9 | RCH | DOV | KAN | CLT | MEM | TEX | PHO | HOM | 64th | 526 | |
| 2007 | Robby Gordon Motorsports | 55 | Ford | DAY; 11 | CAL | MXC | LVS | ATL; 12 | BRI | NSH | TEX | PHO | TAL | RCH | DAR | CLT; 32 | DOV | NSH | KEN | MLW | NHA | DAY | CHI; 34 | GTY | IRP | CGV; 18 | GLN; 36 | MCH | BRI | | | | | CLT; 7 | MEM | TEX; 13 | | | 47th | 1130 | |
| 2007 | Fitz Motorsports | 22 | Dodge | | | | | | | | | | | | | | | | | | | | | | | | | | | CAL; 9 | RCH | | | | | | | | 47th | 1130 | |
| 2007 | Baker Curb Racing | 27 | Ford | | | | | | | | | | | | | | | | | | | | | | | | | | | | | DOV; 31 | KAN | | | | PHO; 20 | HOM | 47th | 1130 | |
| 2008 | Fitz Motorsports | 22 | Dodge | DAY | CAL | LVS | ATL | BRI | NSH | TEX; 20 | PHO; 27 | MXC | TAL | RCH | DAR | CLT | DOV | NSH | KEN | MLW | NHA | DAY | | | | | | | | | | | | | | | | | 73rd | 367 | |
| 2008 | Robby Gordon Motorsports | 55 | Dodge | | | | | | | | | | | | | | | | | | | | CHI; 29 | GTY | IRP | CGV | GLN; 19 | MCH | BRI | CAL | RCH | DOV | KAN | CLT | MEM | TEX | PHO | HOM | 73rd | 367 | |
| 2009 | Robby Gordon Motorsports | 55 | Toyota | DAY | CAL | LVS | BRI | TEX | NSH | PHO | TAL | RCH | DAR | CLT | DOV | NSH | KEN | MLW | NHA | DAY | CHI | GTY | IRP | IOW | GLN; 14 | MCH | BRI | CGV | ATL | RCH | DOV | KAN | CAL | CLT | MEM | TEX | PHO | HOM | 122nd | 121 | |
| 2010 | Robby Gordon Motorsports | 07 | Toyota | DAY | CAL | LVS | BRI | NSH | PHO | TEX | TAL | RCH | DAR | DOV | CLT | NSH | KEN | ROA | NHA | DAY | CHI | GTY | IRP | IOW | GLN | MCH | BRI | CGV; 14 | ATL | RCH | DOV | KAN | CAL | CLT | GTY | TEX | PHO | HOM | 105th | 126 | |
| 2011 | Robby Gordon Motorsports | 77 | Dodge | DAY | PHO | LVS | BRI | CAL | TEX | TAL | NSH | RCH | DAR | DOV | IOW | CLT | CHI | MCH | ROA | DAY | KEN | NHA | NSH | IRP | IOW | GLN | CGV; 31 | BRI | ATL | RCH | CHI | DOV | KAN | CLT | TEX | PHO | HOM | | NA | 0^{1} | |

==== Craftsman Truck Series ====
NASCAR Craftsman Truck Series results
| Year | Team | No. | Make | 1 | 2 | 3 | 4 | 5 | 6 | 7 | 8 | 9 | 10 | 11 | 12 | 13 | 14 | 15 | 16 | 17 | 18 | 19 | 20 | 21 | 22 | 23 | 24 | 25 | 26 | NCTC | Pts | Ref |
|---|---|---|---|---|---|---|---|---|---|---|---|---|---|---|---|---|---|---|---|---|---|---|---|---|---|---|---|---|---|---|---|---|
| 1996 | Team SABCO | 42 | Chevy | HOM | PHO | POR | EVG | TUS | CNS | HPT | BRI | NZH | MLW | LVL | I70 | IRP | FLM | GLN | NSV | RCH | NHA | MAR | NWS; 13 | SON | MMR | PHO | | | | 68th | 274 | |
| 1996 | Roehrig Motorsports | 18 | Chevy | | | | | | | | | | | | | | | | | | | | | | | | LVS; 6 | | | 68th | 274 | |
| 1997 | Roehrig Motorsports | 18 | Dodge | WDW | TUS | HOM | PHO | POR | EVG | I70 | NHA | TEX | BRI | NZH | MLW | LVL | CNS | HPT | IRP | FLM | NSV | GLN | RCH | MAR | SON | MMR | CAL; 30 | PHO | LVS | 123rd | 73 | |
| 2004 | Morgan-Dollar Motorsports | 47 | Chevy | DAY | ATL | MAR | MFD | CLT | DOV | TEX | MEM | MLW | KAN | KEN | GTW | MCH | IRP | NSH | BRI; 4 | RCH | NHA | LVS | CAL | TEX | MAR | PHO | DAR | HOM | | 71st | 160 | |

* Season still in progress
^{1} Ineligible for series points

=== ARCA Permatex SuperCar Series ===
(key) (Bold – Pole position awarded by qualifying time. Italics – Pole position earned by points standings or practice time. * – Most laps led.)

ARCA Permatex SuperCar Series results
| Year | Team | No. | Make | 1 | 2 | 3 | 4 | 5 | 6 | 7 | 8 | 9 | 10 | 11 | 12 | 13 | 14 | 15 | 16 | 17 | 18 | APSC | Pts | Ref |
|---|---|---|---|---|---|---|---|---|---|---|---|---|---|---|---|---|---|---|---|---|---|---|---|---|
| 1990 | Donlavey Racing | 90 | Ford | DAY | ATL | KIL | TAL | FRS | POC | KIL | TOL | HAG | POC | TAL | MCH | ISF | TOL | DSF | WIN | DEL | **ATL**; 21 | 97th | - | |

=== American open-wheel racing ===
(key) (Races in bold indicate pole position)

==== CART ====
| Year | Team | No. | Chassis | Engine | 1 | 2 | 3 | 4 | 5 | 6 | 7 | 8 | 9 | 10 | 11 | 12 | 13 | 14 | 15 | 16 | 17 | 18 | 19 | 20 | Pos. | Pts | Ref |
|---|---|---|---|---|---|---|---|---|---|---|---|---|---|---|---|---|---|---|---|---|---|---|---|---|---|---|---|
| 1992 | Chip Ganassi Racing | 6 | Lola T91/00 | Ford XB V8t | SRF | PHX | LBH | INDY | DET; 17 | POR; 13 | MIL; 21 | NHA | TOR; 8 | MCH | CLE; 8 | ROA; 18 | VAN; 17 | MOH | NAZ | LAG | | | | | 20th | 10 | |
| 1993 | A. J. Foyt Enterprises | 14 | Lola T92/00 | Ford XB V8t | SRF; 3 | PHX; 18 | | | | | | | | MCH; 15 | | | VAN; 23 | | | LAG; 10 | | | | | 10th | 84 | |
| 1993 | A. J. Foyt Enterprises | 14 | Lola T93/00 | Ford XB V8t | | | LBH; DSQ | INDY; 27 | MIL; 10 | DET; 8 | POR; 8 | CLE; 6 | TOR; 6 | | NHA; 5 | ROA; 20 | | MOH; 2 | NAZ; 4 | | | | | | 10th | 84 | |
| 1994 | Walker Racing | 9 | Lola T94/00 | Ford XB V8t | SRF; 23 | PHX; 7 | LBH; 3 | INDY; 5 | MIL; 6 | DET; 3 | POR; 4 | CLE; 11 | **TOR**; 6 | MCH; 13 | MOH; 4 | NHA; 13 | **VAN**; 2 | ROA; 25 | NAZ; 23 | LAG; 13 | | | | | 5th | 104 | |
| 1995 | Walker Racing | 5 | Reynard 95i | Ford XB V8t | MIA; 13 | SRF; 14 | PHX; 1 | LBH; 22 | **NAZ**; 4 | INDY; 5 | MIL; 5 | **DET**; 1 | POR; 8 | ROA; 26 | TOR; 5 | CLE; 6 | MCH; DNS | MOH; 8 | NHA; 9 | VAN; 3 | LAG; 15 | | | | 5th | 121 | |
| 1996 | Walker Racing | 5 | Reynard 96i | Ford XB V8t | MIA; 3 | RIO; 15 | SRF; 16 | LBH; 13 | NAZ; 22 | 500; 20 | MIL; 17 | DET; 26 | POR; 10 | CLE; 18 | TOR; 9 | MCH; 8 | MOH; 18 | ROA; 17 | VAN; 10 | LAG; 15 | | | | | 18th | 29 | |
| 1997 | Hogan Racing | 9 | Reynard 97i | Mercedes-Benz IC108D V8t | MIA | SRF | LBH | NAZ | RIO | GAT | MIL | DET | POR | CLE | TOR | MCH | MOH | ROA | VAN | LAG | FON; 8 | | | | 26th | 5 | |
| 1998 | Arciero-Wells Racing | 24 | Reynard 98i | Toyota RV8C V8t | MIA | MOT | LBH | NAZ; 7 | RIO | GAT; 13 | MIL; 20 | | POR; 23 | | | | | | | | | | | | 23rd | 13 | |
| 1998 | Arciero-Wells Racing | 24 | Reynard 97i | Toyota RV8C V8t | | | | | | | | DET; 14 | | | | | | | | | | | | | 23rd | 13 | |
| 1998 | Arciero-Wells Racing | 24 | Reynard 98i | Toyota RV8D V8t | | | | | | | | | | CLE; 23 | TOR; 13 | MCH; 27 | MOH; 11 | ROA; 12 | | | HOU; 13 | SRF; 16 | FON; 9 | | 23rd | 13 | |
| 1998 | Arciero-Wells Racing | 24 | Reynard 97i | Toyota RV8D V8t | | | | | | | | | | | | | | | VAN; 23 | LAG; 13 | | | | | 23rd | 13 | |
| 1999 | Team Gordon | 22 | Reynard 98i | Toyota RV8D V8t | MIA; 19 | MOT; 8 | LBH; 16 | NAZ; 19 | | | | | | | | | | | | | | | | | 20th | 27 | |
| 1999 | Team Gordon | 22 | Swift 010.c | Toyota RV8D V8t | | | | | RIO; 14 | GAT; 27 | MIL; 24 | POR; 17 | CLE; 9 | ROA; 8 | TOR; 13 | MCH; 26 | DET; 25 | MOH; 10 | | | | | SRF; 8 | | 20th | 27 | |
| 1999 | Team Gordon | 22 | Eagle 997 | Toyota RV8D V8t | | | | | | | | | | | | | | | CHI; 10 | VAN; 22 | LAG; 19 | HOU; 21 | | | 20th | 27 | |
| 1999 | Team Gordon | 22 | Eagle 987 | Toyota RV8D V8t | | | | | | | | | | | | | | | | | | | | FON; 11 | 20th | 27 | |

==== IndyCar Series ====
| Year | Team | No. | Chassis | Engine | 1 | 2 | 3 | 4 | 5 | 6 | 7 | 8 | 9 | 10 | 11 | 12 | 13 | 14 | 15 | 16 | Pos. | Pts | Ref |
|---|---|---|---|---|---|---|---|---|---|---|---|---|---|---|---|---|---|---|---|---|---|---|---|
| 1996-97 | Walker Racing | 50 | Reynard 95i | Ford XB V8t | NHA | LVS; 14 | WDW | PHX | | | | | | | | | | | | | 37th | 27 | |
| 1996-97 | Team SABCO | 42 | G Force GF01 | Oldsmobile Aurora V8 | | | | | INDY; 29 | TXS | PPR | CLT | NHA | LVS | | | | | | | 37th | 27 | |
| 1999 | Team Menard | 32 | Dallara IR9 | Oldsmobile Aurora V8 | WDW | PHX | CLT | INDY; 4 | TXS | PPR | ATL | DOV | PPR | LVS | TXS | | | | | | 31st | 32 | |
| 2000 | Team Menard | 32 | Dallara IR-00 | Oldsmobile Aurora V8 | WDW | PHX | LVS | INDY; 6 | TXS | PPR | ATL | KTY | TXS | | | | | | | | 29th | 28 | |
| 2001 | A. J. Foyt Enterprises | 41 | Dallara IR-01 | Oldsmobile Aurora V8 | PHX | HMS | ATL | INDY; 21 | TXS | PPR | RIR | KAN | NSH | KTY | GAT | CHI | TXS | | | | 45th | 9 | |
| 2002 | Team Menard | 31 | Dallara IR-02 | Chevrolet Indy V8 | HMS | PHX | FON | NAZ | INDY; 8 | TXS | PPR | RIR | KAN | NSH | MCH | KTY | GAT | CHI | TXS | | 39th | 24 | |
| 2003 | Andretti Green Racing | 27 | Dallara IR-03 | Honda HI3R V8 | HMS | PHX | MOT | INDY; 22 | TXS | PPR | RIR | KAN | NSH | MCH | GAT | KTY | NAZ | CHI | FON | TXS | 33rd | 8 | |
| 2004 | Robby Gordon Motorsports | 70 | Dallara IR-04 | Chevrolet Indy V8 | HMS | PHX | MOT | INDY; 29 | TXS | RIR | KAN | NSH | MIL | MCH | KTY | PPR | NAZ | CHI | FON | TXS | 36th | 10 | |

===== Indianapolis 500 results =====
| Year | Chassis | Engine | Start | Finish | Team |
|---|---|---|---|---|---|
| 1993 | Lola | Ford-Cosworth | 25 | 27 | Foyt |
| 1994 | Lola | Ford-Cosworth | 19 | 5 | Walker |
| 1995 | Reynard | Ford-Cosworth | 7 | 5 | Walker |
| 1997 | G-Force | Oldsmobile | 12 | 29 | SABCO |
| 1999 | Dallara | Oldsmobile | 4 | 4 | Menard |
| 2000 | Dallara | Oldsmobile | 4 | 6 | Menard |
| 2001 | Dallara | Oldsmobile | 3 | 21 | Foyt/Childress |
| 2002 | Dallara | Chevrolet | 11 | 8 | Menard/Childress |
| 2003 | Dallara | Honda | 3 | 22 | Andretti Green |
| 2004 | Dallara | Chevrolet | 18 | 29 | Gordon |

=== International Race of Champions ===
(key) (Bold – Pole position. * – Most laps led.)

International Race of Champions results
| Year | Make | 1 | 2 | 3 | 4 | Pos. | Points | Ref |
|---|---|---|---|---|---|---|---|---|
| 1996 | Pontiac | DAY; 2 | TAL; 2* | CLT; 12 | MCH; 4 | 2nd | 54 | |
| 1997 | Pontiac | DAY; 8 | CLT; 2 | CAL | MCH; 2 | 2nd | 63 | |

=== Dakar Rally ===
| Year | Class | Vehicle | Position | Stages won |
|---|---|---|---|---|
| 2005 | Cars | (Germany) Volkswagen | 12th | 2 |
| 2006 | Cars | (United States) Hummer | DNF | 0 |
| 2007 | Cars | (United States) Hummer | 8th | 1 |
| 2008 | Event cancelled – replaced by the 2008 Central Europe Rally | | | |
| 2009 | Cars | (United States) Hummer | **3rd** | 0 |
| 2010 | Cars | (United States) Hummer | 8th | 1 |
| 2011 | Cars | (United States) Hummer | DNF | 0 |
| 2012 | Cars | (United States) Hummer | DSQ | 1 |
| 2013 | Cars | (United States) Hummer | 14th | 2 |
| 2014 | Cars | (United States) Hummer | DNF | 0 |
| 2015 | Cars | (United States) Hummer | 19th | 1 |
| 2016 | Cars | (United States) Gordini | 25th | 0 |
| 2017 | did not enter | | | |
| 2018 | did not enter | | | |
| 2019 | Cars | (United States) Arctic Cat | 49th | 0 |

=== Stadium Super Trucks ===
(key) (Bold – Pole position. Italics – Fastest qualifier. * – Most laps led.)

Stadium Super Trucks results
| Year | 1 | 2 | 3 | 4 | 5 | 6 | 7 | 8 | 9 | 10 | 11 | 12 | 13 | 14 | 15 | 16 | 17 | 18 | 19 | 20 | 21 | 22 | SSTC | Pts | Ref |
|---|---|---|---|---|---|---|---|---|---|---|---|---|---|---|---|---|---|---|---|---|---|---|---|---|---|
| 2013 | PHO; 3 | LBH; 2 | **LAN**; 1 | SDG; 3 | SDG; 1 | STL; 2 | TOR; 6 | TOR; 2 | CRA; 2 | CRA; 3 | OCF; 1 | OCF; 2 | OCF; 4 | CPL; 2 | | | | | | | | | 1st | 403 | |
| 2014 | STP; 1 | STP; 2 | LBH; 1 | IMS; 1 | IMS; 5 | DET; 2 | DET; 5 | DET; 3 | AUS; 3 | TOR; 2 | TOR; 2 | OCF; 1* | OCF; 2* | CSS; 1* | LVV; 1 | LVV; 2 | | | | | | | 1st | 492 | |
| 2015 | ADE; 2 | ADE; 2 | ADE; 2 | STP; 3 | STP; 3 | LBH; 3 | DET; 1 | DET; 6 | DET; 7 | AUS; 2 | TOR; 3 | TOR; 3 | OCF; 2 | OCF; 3 | OCF; 2 | SRF; 4 | SRF; 2 | SRF; 3 | SRF; 8 | SYD; 8 | LVV; 1 | LVV; 2 | 2nd | 584 | |
| 2016 | ADE; 4 | ADE; 3 | ADE; 2 | STP; 5 | STP; 9 | LBH; 11 | LBH; 2* | DET | DET | DET; 6 | TOW; 11 | TOW; 1* | TOW; 10 | TOR; 4 | TOR; 3 | CLT; 3 | CLT; 10 | OCF; 1 | OCF; 5 | SRF; 5 | SRF; 1* | SRF; 4 | 3rd | 444 | |
| 2017 | ADE; 12 | **ADE**; 3 | ADE; 4 | STP; 1* | STP; 3 | LBH; 4 | LBH; 1* | PER; 4 | PER; 1 | PER; 2 | DET | DET | TEX; 2 | TEX; 4 | HID; 2* | HID; 3 | HID; 2 | BEI; 2 | GLN; 1* | GLN; 2 | ELS; 3 | **ELS**; 3 | 3rd | 530 | |
| 2018 | ELS; 4* | ADE; 11 | ADE; 1* | ADE; 10* | LBH; 2 | LBH; 4 | PER; 5 | PER; 11 | DET; Rpl^{†} | DET; Rpl^{†} | TEX; 5 | TEX; 3 | ROA; 1 | ROA; 6 | SMP; 4 | SMP; 4 | HLN; 10 | HLN; 5 | MXC; 1 | MXC; 4 | | | 3rd | 410 | |
| 2019 | COA; 2 | COA; 5 | TEX; 7 | **TEX**; 3 | LBH; 9 | LBH; 1* | TOR; 3 | TOR; 4 | MOH; 4 | MOH; 6 | MOH; 1 | MOH; 4 | ROA; 2* | ROA; 6 | ROA; 3* | POR; 4 | POR; 4 | SRF; 1 | SRF; 4 | | | | 2nd | 422 | |
| 2020 | ADE; 1* | ADE; 2 | ADE; 2 | ROA; 3 | ROA; 2 | | | | | | | | | | | | | | | | | | N/A^{1} | – | |
| 2021 | STP; 4 | STP; 3 | MOH; 3 | MOH; 1* | MOH; 4 | MOH; 2* | NSH; 1* | NSH; 5 | LBH; 4 | LBH; 1* | | | | | | | | | | | | | 2nd | 270 | |
| 2022 | LBH; 2 | LBH; 1 | MOH | MOH | NSH | NSH | BRI; 3 | BRI; 4 | | | | | | | | | | | | | | | 5th | 123 | |
| 2023 | LBH; 2 | LBH; 4 | NSH; 14 | **NSH**; 1* | | | | | | | | | | | | | | | | | | | 4th | 90 | |
| 2024 | LBH; 2 | LBH; 7 | ADE; 1 | ADE; 1 | | | | | | | | | | | | | | | | | | | 1st | 114 | |
| 2025 | LBH; 3 | LBH; 9 | | | | | | | | | | | | | | | | | | | | | 4th | 38 | |
| 2026 | LBH; 2 | LBH; 2 | | | | | | | | | | | | | | | | | | | | | -* | -* | |
^{†} – Replaced by Russell Boyle, points went to Gordon

^{*} Season in progress.
^{1} Standings were not recorded by the series for the 2020 season.

Sporting positions
| Preceded by First | Stadium Super Trucks Champion; 2013–2014 | Succeeded by Sheldon Creed |
