= Christopher Polvoorde =

American off-road racer

- Nationality: American
- Born: July 28, 2000 (age 26) Hemet, California
- Current team: Polvoorde Racing
- Car number: 94

Championship titles
- 2021 2019 2019 2016 2015–2016 2015: GAS Pro Lite; Crandon Pro Lite; Lucas Oil MidWest Short Course League Pro Lite; LOORRS Mod Kart Challenge Cup; Crandon Mod Kart; LOORRS Mod Kart

Awards
- 2017 2014: LOORRS Pro Lite Rookie of the Year; LOORRS Mod Kart Rookie of the Year

Christopher Polvoorde (born July 28, 2000) is an American off-road racer from Southern California. He has raced in many different forms of off-road competition including short course, desert racing, and rally raid, while also dabbling in other disciplines like dirt track racing.

He has competed in short course series like Great American Shortcourse and Lucas Oil Off Road Racing Series, as well as desert championships in SCORE International, National Off-Road Racing Association, and King of the Hammers. In 2019, Polvoorde swept the Lucas Oil Mid West Short Course League, winning all seven races and the Crandon International Off-Road Raceway Pro Lite World Championship.

== Racing career ==
Throughout his career, Polvoorde mainly races the No. 94 STEEL-IT / TIS Wheels Ford Ranger under the Polvoorde Racing Banner. His father Chip Polvoorde, crew Chief Jimmy Davidson, and driving coach Cory Kruseman who also works with Polvoorde as his spotter, make up the program's backbone.

=== Short course racing ===
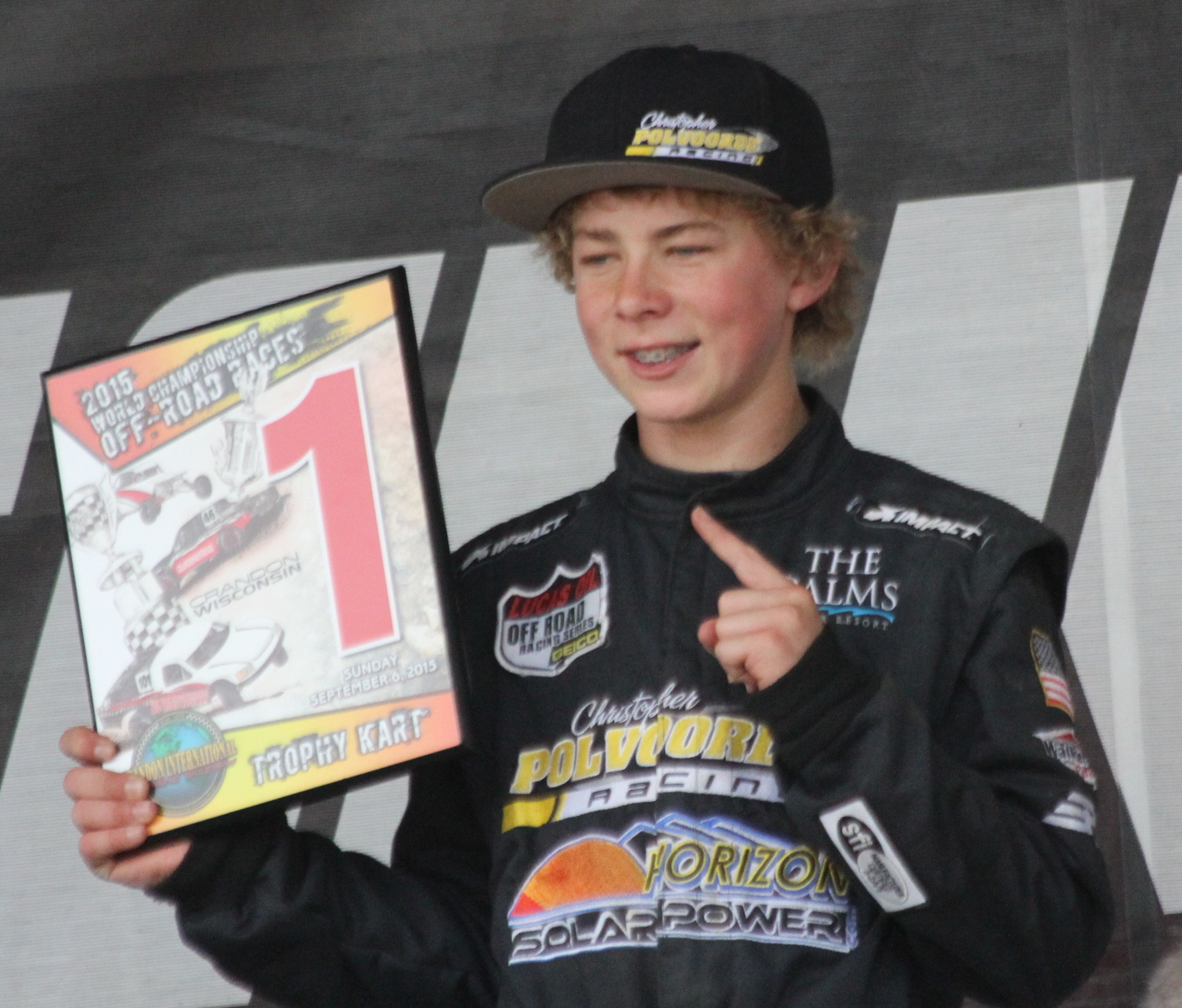
Polvoorde in 2015 after winning in Trophy Karts

Polvoorde began his motorsport career racing in the Lucas Oil Off Road Racing Series' Modified Kart Division, which is known to produce talent such as five-time LOORRS champion and future NASCAR champion Sheldon Creed, Hailie Deegan, Darren Hardesty Jr., Mitch Guthrie, Mitchell Dejong, Myles Cheek, Jerett Brooks, and RJ Anderson. He won Rookie of the Year honors in 2014.

In 2015, Polvoorde won the LOORRS Mod Kart title and the Crandon Mod Kart World Championship, and backed up the latter in 2016. He also won the 2016 LOORRS Mod Kart Challenge Cup.

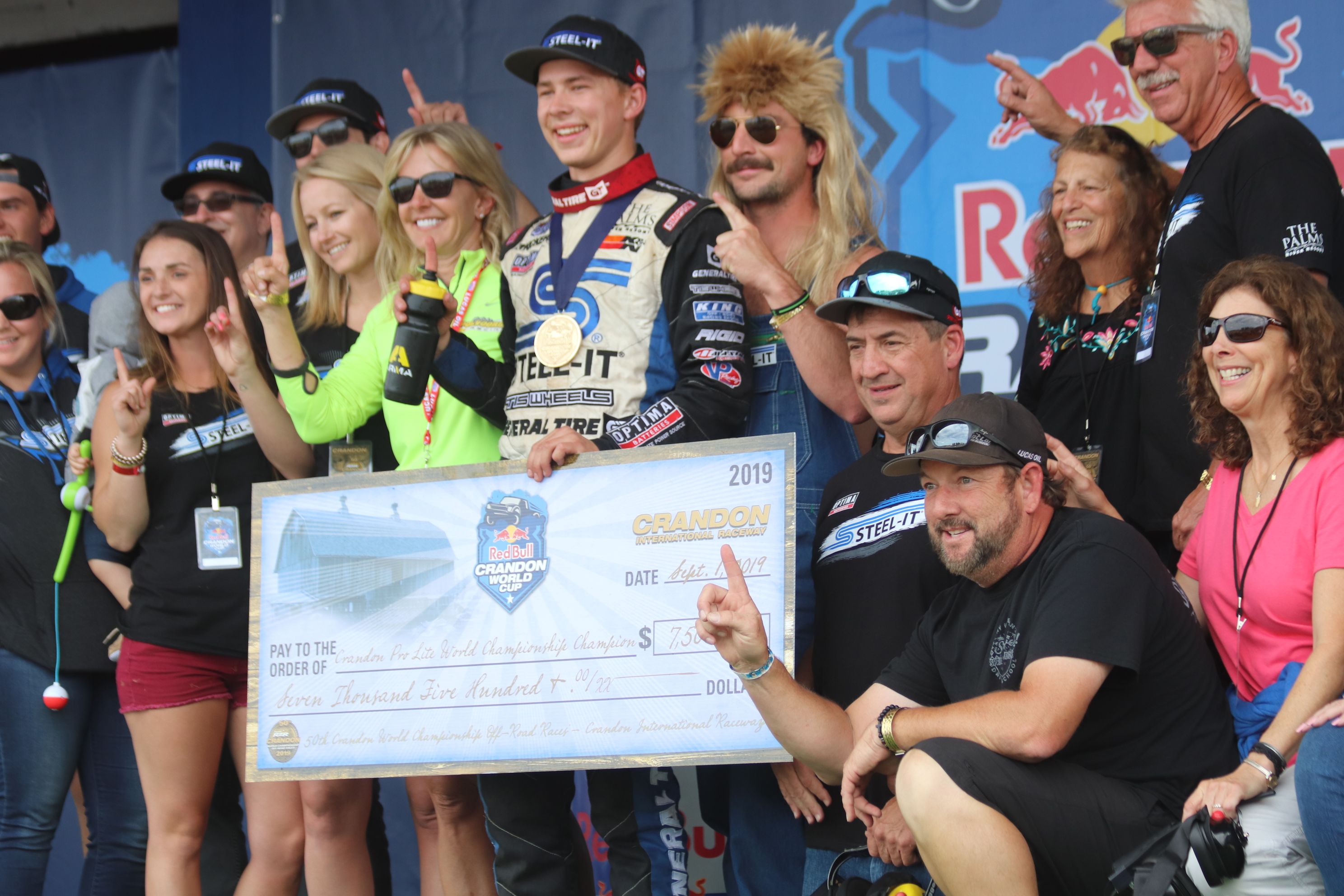
Polvoorde with his 2019 Pro Lite crew at Crandon

Polvoorde graduated to the LOORRS Pro Lite class in 2017 and claimed Rookie of the Year. A two-win campaign and third-place points finish followed.

Polvoorde won his first professional racing championship in the Lucas Oil Midwest Short Course League (LOMSCL) by winning all seven races to claim the Pro Lite Championship. He also won the Crandon Pro Lite World Championship.

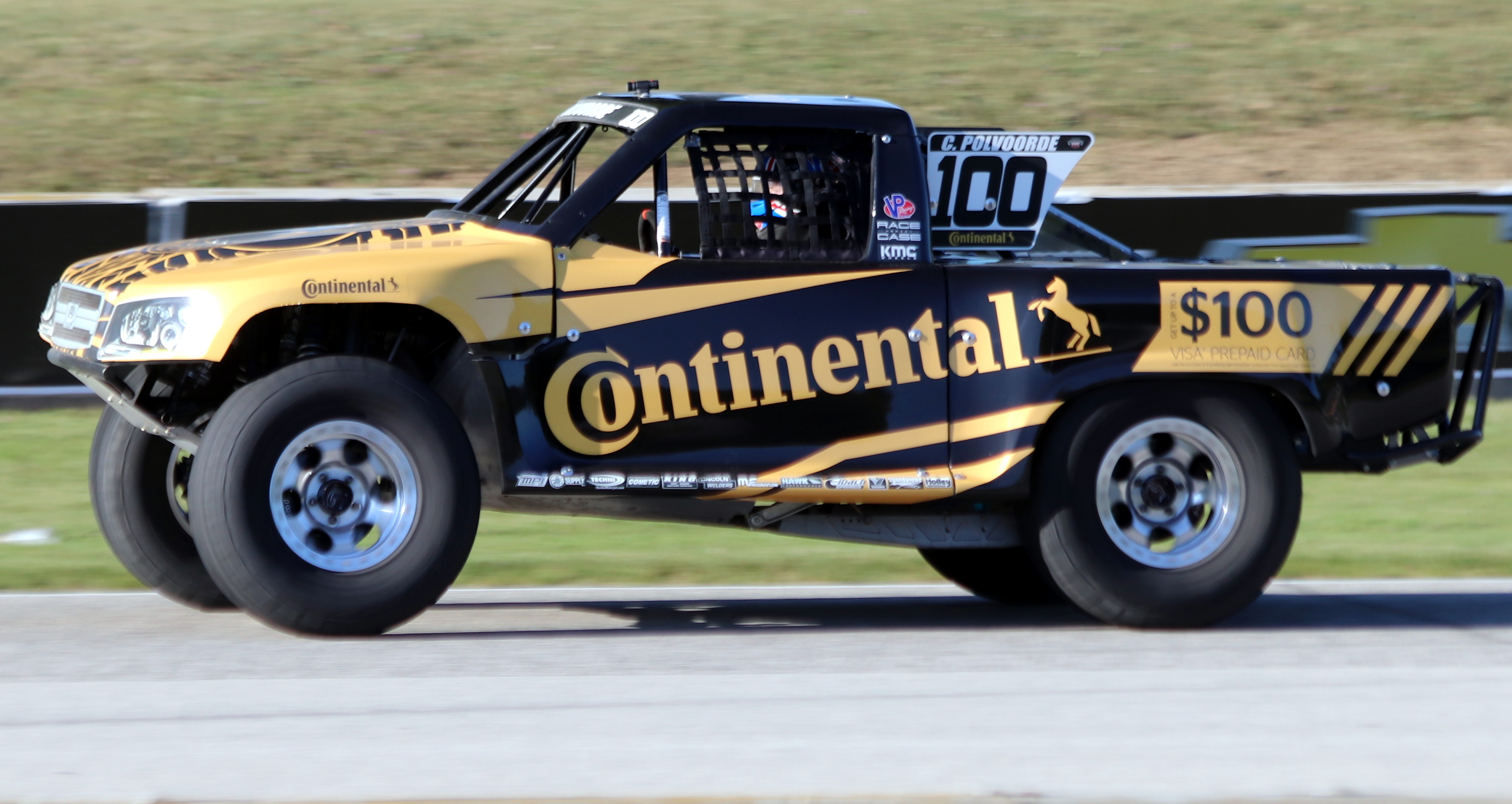
2019 Stadium Super Truck at Road America

Also during the 2019 season, Polvoorde was invited to be a guest driver of Continental Tire's No. 100 in the Stadium Super Trucks Series. He was one of five drivers to take the wheel of the specially branded Continental Tire's Truck and their flagship program, a $100 prepaid Visa card promotion. Polvoorde has been supported by General Tire which falls under Continental's umbrella. He raced Rounds 13, 14, and 15 of the 2019 Stadium Super Truck Series at Road America in Wisconsin and finished well in all three events.

Polvoorde finished runner-up in the 2020 LOORRS Pro Lite standings, the final year before the series folded.

=== Desert racing ===
In 2018, Polvoorde entered a classic Ford F100 in the National Off-Road Racing Association Mexican 1000 Rally. Racing No. 9494 in the Vintage Open Class, Christopher finished 2nd in his division and 24th overall with a total race time of 19 Hours, 57 Minutes, and 5 Seconds

Polvoorde races the factory backed Team Honda Talon 1000R, in the ULTRA 4 King of the Hammers, "the toughest one-day off-road race on the planet" as the event's tagline presents. During the 2020 UTV event, Polvoorde raced the No. 94 Honda Talon 1000R to a 17th-place finish. 130 competitors started the event and only 33 were able to finish the course. He also competed in that year's Mint 400.

=== Other racing ===
In 2018, Polvoorde along with his co-driver Jimmy Davidson raced in the Asia Baja 1000, a stage rally race through Inner Mongolia and allowed for Polvoorde to experience a different side of motorsports culture. Polvoorde reported finishing the event and qualifying 15th out of 150 competitors.

In 2019, under the banner of Kruseman Motorsports, Polvoorde was part of a six-car team entered in the Lucas Oil Chili Bowl. He drove the Palms Resort / FK Rod Ends / Lucas Oil Speedway No. 94 with driving coach Cory Kruseman assisting him in adapting to the midget race car. Kruseman is a driving coach who has worked with various racers on car control and is a former Chili Bowl champion. This was Polvoorde's first appearance at the event. He advanced to the C Feature 2, but did not finish and did not start the N Feature 2.

== Sponsors ==
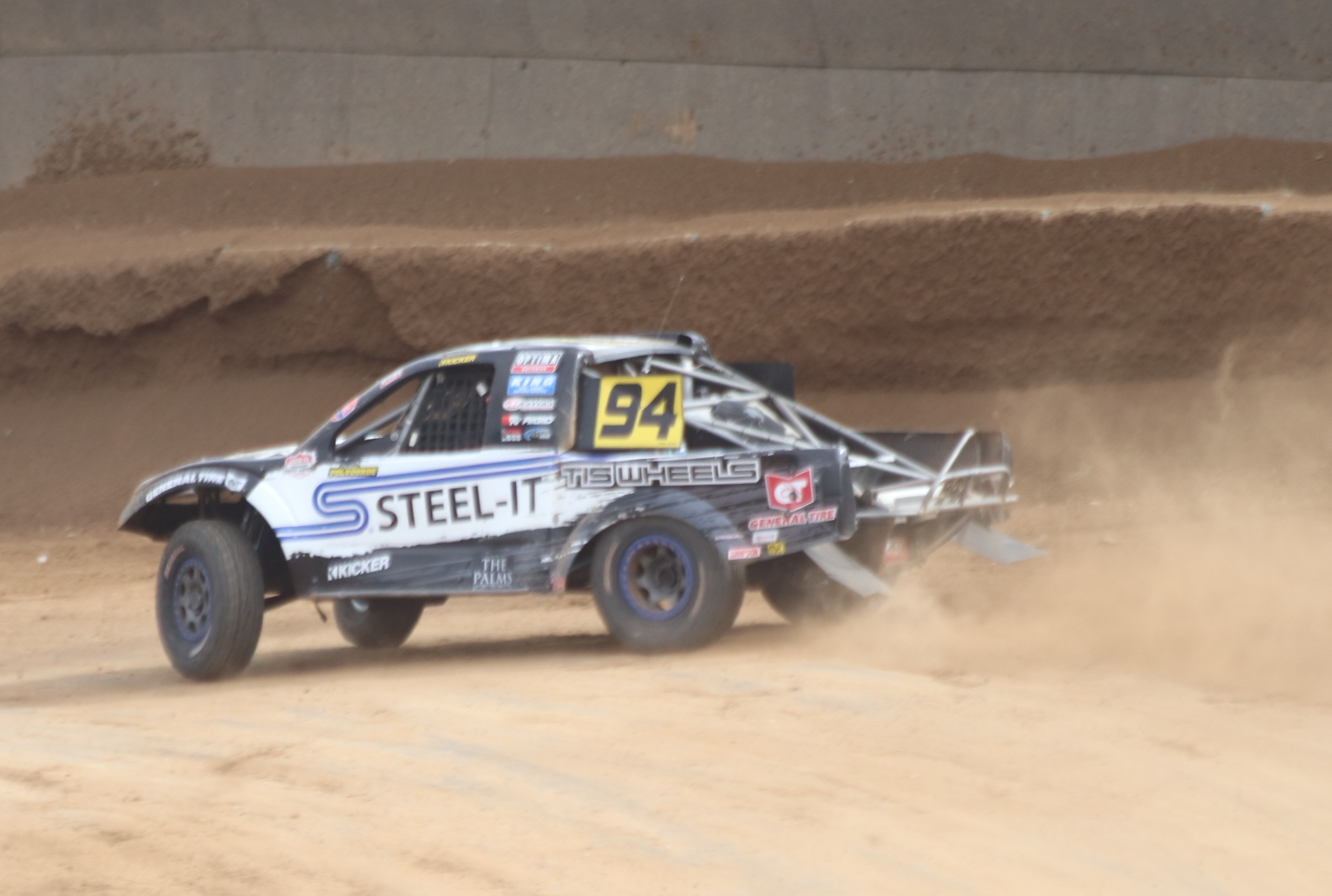
2019 Pro Lite truck at Crandon

- Honda Power Sports and Honda Racing Corporation: Polvoorde competed in desert racing for Team Honda Talon Factory Racing.
- Ford Motor Company and Ford Performance: Polvoorde built two project vehicles for Ford and debuts at the 2019 SEMA Show.
- General Tire
- Optima Batteries: Regularly taps Polvoorde and activates him in big events and promotions such as the Hi-Performance Expo Powered By Optima Batteries at Circuit of the Americas, Moab 4x4 Expo, and the Sand Hills Open Road Challenge.
- TIS Wheels
- STEEL-IT: Polvoorde is the primary backed short course off-road racer driving the No. 94 STEEL-IT Pro-Lite.

== Personal life ==
Polvoorde is a full-time college student attending University of San Diego on scholarship seeking a double major in finance and real estate through the USD School of Business.

== In media ==
- Polvoorde appears on Season 2, Episode 2 of the Fuse television show T-Pain's School of Business. Originally aired on August 13, 2019, Polvoorde is featured in an interview and is seen giving T-Pain a hot lap in his two-seater Pro Lite around Glen Helen Raceway.
- As a regular participating medial liaison, Polvoorde is often seen on local morning news field reports before events. He was seen on Channel 8 KLAS News Now in Las Vegas highlighting the SEMA Show on November 3, 2021 giving a ride-a-long to reporter Rocky Nash in his Pro Lite.
- Polvoorde began a YouTube vlog in 2019 and started uploading weekly videos every Wednesday to allow viewers to follow his career and off-track life. As of the ending of 2020 racing season, Polvoorde has 62 videos uploaded with 255,206 views and 1,540 subscribers.
- In 2020, University of San Diego spotlighted and recognized Polvoorde's achievements as a professional off-road racer in their online News Center.

== Motorsports career results ==
=== Career summary ===
Season	Series	Races	Wins	Podiums	Poles	Points	Position	Ref
2012	LOORRS Junior 1 Karts	2	0	0	N/A	294	17th	
2013	LOORRS Modified Karts	6	0	0	N/A	142	21st	
2014	LOORRS Modified Karts	15	1	7	N/A	170	**2nd**	
2015	LOORRS Modified Karts	17	7	11	N/A	630	**1st**	
2016	LOORRS Modified Karts	13	3	9	N/A	568	**3rd**	
2016	LOORRS Pro Lite	5	0	0	0	170	19th	
2017	LOORRS Pro Lite	13	0	4	0	514	4th	
2018	LOORRS Pro Lite	11	2	4	1	493	**3rd**	
2019	Lucas Oil Midwest Short Course League Pro Lite	7	7	7	N/A	50	**1st**	
2019	LOORRS Pro Lite	9	0	9	0	361	6th	
2019	Stadium Super Trucks	3	0	1	0	54	12th	
2020	LOORRS Pro Lite	10	2	4	1	465	**2nd**	

=== Stadium Super Trucks ===
(key) (Bold – Pole position. Italics – Fastest qualifier. * – Most laps led.)

Stadium Super Trucks results
Year	1	2	3	4	5	6	7	8	9	10	11	12	13	14	15	16	17	18	19	SSTC	Pts	Ref
2019	COA	COA	TEX	TEX	LBH	LBH	TOR	TOR	MOH	MOH	MOH	MOH	ROA; 4	ROA; 3	ROA; 6	POR	POR	SRF	SRF	12th	54	
