= Ryan Beat =

American racing driver (born 1986)

- Born: March 31, 1986 (age 40) El Cajon, California, U.S.

Championship Off-Road career
- Debut season: 2020
- Current team: Ryan Beat Motorsports
- Car number: 51
- Engine: Chevrolet

Previous series
- 2019, 2022–2023: Stadium Super Trucks

Championship titles
- 2017–2019: LOORRS Pro Lite

Awards
- 2018, 2020: Rick Huseman Award

Ryan Beat (born March 31, 1986) is an American professional off-road racing driver. He competes in the Championship Off-Road Series, driving the No. 51 Pro 2 Chevrolet for his team Ryan Beat Motorsports.

A two-time Lucas Oil Off Road Racing Series (LOORRS) champion in the Pro Lite class, Beat competed full-time in LOORRS from 2011 to 2020. Following LOORRS' shutdown, he moved to Championship Off-Road. He has also raced in the Stadium Super Trucks.

== Early life and career ==
Beat was born in El Cajon, California, and began racing dirt bikes at the age of five. While racing for the factory Kawasaki team, he shattered his arm in a riding accident. His friend asked him to race a trophy cart and he accepted. He finished third in his first race and with help from Kenny Osborn and Black Rhino, built a UTV. He won in his third start and after 10 race wins in the SR1 UTV class, decided to build a Pro Lite truck in 2012 and finished second in the championship points that year.

== Racing career ==
=== 2011 ===
Beat signed with the Hart & Huntington team, co-owned by the professional motorcyclist, Carey Hart. He campaigned the No. 851 SR-1 UTV under the Hart & Huntington umbrella.

=== 2012 ===
Beat was one of three drivers for Hart & Huntington Off Road racing the No. 51 ProLite for his first full season. In August, at Wild West Motorsports Park in Reno, Nevada, Beat posted his first career Lucas Oil Off Road Racing Series (LOORRS) win in the ProLite class.

=== 2013 ===
In the Lucas Oil Challenge Cup, Beat finished third in PRO-4 for Premiere Motorsports Group. In the last seven races of the LOORRS season, Beat finished in the top-five, six times with two podiums.

=== 2014 ===
Beat almost quit off-road racing but then started his own team, Ryan Beat Motorsports (RBM) in 2014.

=== 2015 ===
Beat won his first Pro Lite race in LOORRS competition as a driver/owner in the No. 51 Pro Lite truck.

=== 2016 ===
After the first two races of the season, Beat broke his foot while unloading his race truck. After surgery, and building a special brake pedal, Beat continued racing that year. Racing the No. 51 in the Pro-Lite class, Beat captured three wins and finished third in the points.

=== 2017 ===
In 2017, Beat traveled to Crandon, Wisconsin to compete at the birthplace of short course racing, Crandon International Raceway. Beat won his first race there.

=== 2018 ===
Beat returned to Team GT in the No. 51 Pro Lite truck. Competing in the No. 51 Pro Lite truck, Beat won the season opener at Wild Horse Pass Motorsports Park in Chandler, AZ. Beat went on to win the LOORRS Pro Lite Championship that year, never finishing off the podium. His first championship since entering the Pro-Lite class in 2012.

=== 2019 ===
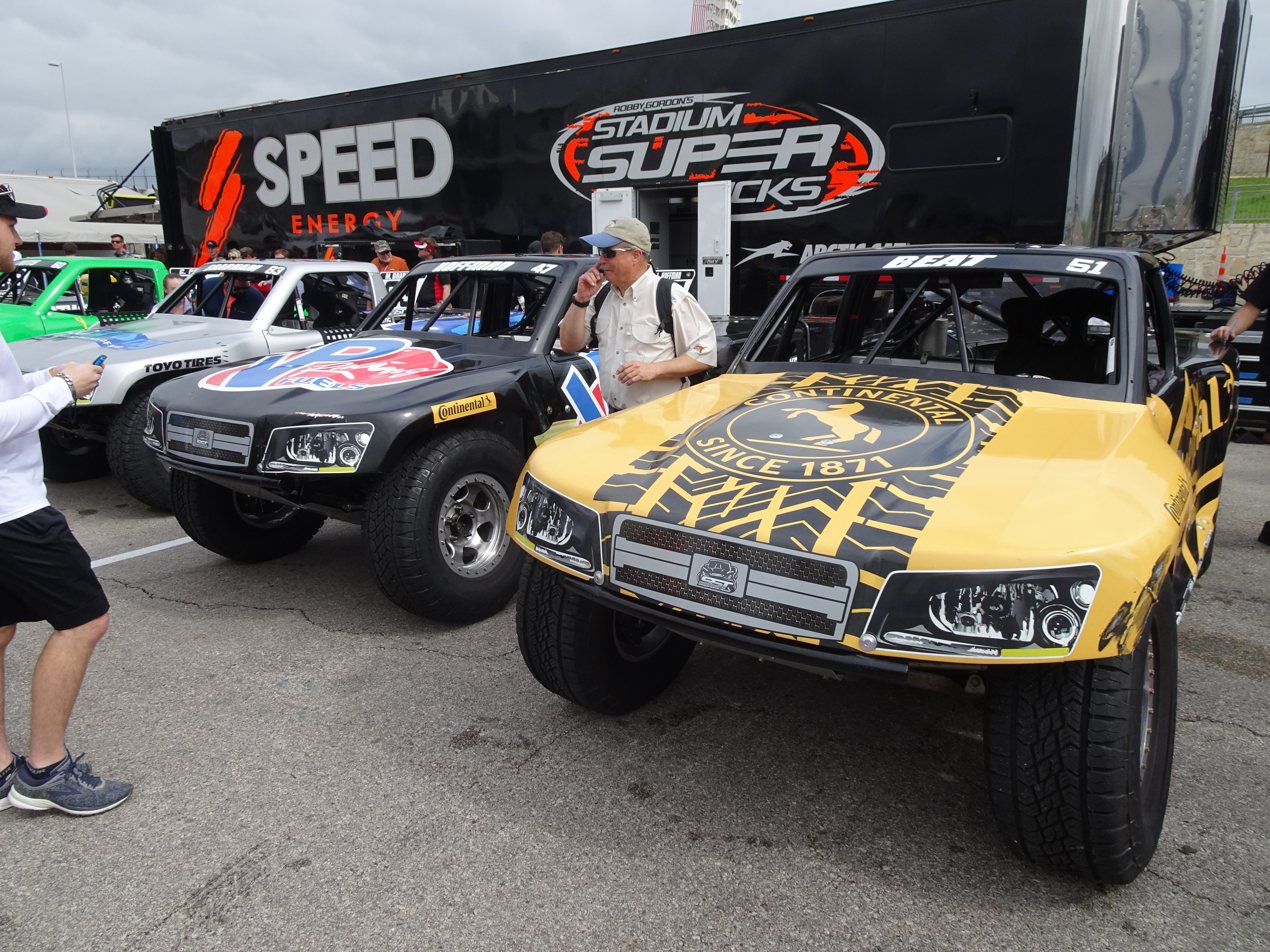
Beat's Stadium Super Truck (right) at Circuit of the Americas in 2019

Beginning in 2019, Beat wanted to win back-to-back Pro Lite Championships in the Lucas Oil Off Road Racing Series. Beat started the year with a win and finished outside the top five just one time. He then finished the year as back-to-back Pro-Lite champion (also winning the championship in 2018). At the conclusion of the 2019 season, he prepared to move to the Pro 2 class in 2020.

Beat also made his Stadium Super Trucks debut in the season opener at Circuit of the Americas, where he drove the No. 51 Continental Tire truck. He scored a podium in the first race by finishing third.

=== 2020 ===
Beat moved to the Pro 2 class and won in the Lucas Oil Off Road Racing Series and Championship Off-Road Series. He also finished on the podium ten times.

=== 2021 ===
In 2021, Beat moved to Championship Off-Road full time to race in the Pro 2 and new PRO SPEC classes; Ryan Beat Motorsports was the only team in the series with factory backing from Chevrolet. He also moved R/BM from California to North Carolina. Beat raced the first of its kind PRO SPEC truck in the 2021 Championship Off-Road Series, designing and building a race-ready benchmark prototype.

=== 2022 ===
Ahead of the 2022 Championship Off-Road season, Ryan Beat Motorsports expanded to field five trucks: a Pro 2 for the eponymous owner; three Pro Lites for Carson Parrish, Mason Prater, and newcomer Brody Eggleston; and a Pro SPEC for rookie Gray Leadbetter. The 2022 Champ Off Road season kicked off at Antigo. As an owner, Beat made history when his driver, Leadbetter, became the first female to win a professional Champ Off-Road race in the PRO-SPEC class. Leadbetter would go on to win the PRO-SPEC championship, becoming the first female to win a championship in Champ Off-Road history. The win also gave Beat an additional championship as a car owner. Beat closed out the 2022 Champ Off Road season with three podium finishes at Antigo, Crandon, and ERX. In addition to short course off-road racing, Beat entered his second career Stadium Super Truck race in Nashville. Following a battle for the lead, Beat finished fourth.

=== 2023 ===
Beat competed for the first time at The Great American Shortcourse series' season opener at King of the Hammers on Monday, February 6th. He qualified on the pole in the PRO-2 class, and after an inverted start, he raced from sixth to win.

== In media ==
Beat served in the 2015 film Furious 7.

Beat was featured in a General Tire commercial that aired from 2018 to 2021.

== Motorsports career results ==
=== Career summary ===
SEASON	CLASS	TEAM	RACES	POLES	WINS	TOP 5	TOP 10	POS
2010	UTV	Osborne Racing	4	1	2	3	4	9th
2011	UTV	Hart & Huntington	10	4	4	4	9	7th
2011	Pro Lite	Hart & Huntington	8	0	0	0	4	13th
2012	Pro Lite	Hart & Huntington	15	0	1	8	14	2nd
2013	Pro Lite	Hart & Huntington	16	0	0	2	4	17th
2013	Pro 2	Hart & Huntington	8	0	0	1	6	15th
2013	Pro 4	Hart & Huntington	10	0	0	6	10	10th
2014	Pro Lite	Hart & Huntington	16	0	0	8	11	5th
2015	Pro Lite	Ryan Beat Motorsports	17	0	1	6	10	8th
2016	Pro Lite	Ryan Beat Motorsports	16	6	3	13	13	3rd
2017	Pro Lite	Ryan Beat Motorsports	14	1	1	8	10	7th
2018	Pro Lite	Ryan Beat Motorsports	11	3	4	9	10	1st
2019	Pro Lite	Ryan Beat Motorsports	10	3	2	8	10	1st
2020	Pro 2	Ryan Beat Motorsports	10	2	1	9	10	3rd
2021	Pro 2	Ryan Beat Motorsports	12		2	7	9	4th
2022	Pro 2	Ryan Beat Motorsports	12		0	5	5	9th

=== Stadium Super Trucks ===
(key) (Bold – Pole position. Italics – Fastest qualifier. * – Most laps led.)

Stadium Super Trucks results
Year	1	2	3	4	5	6	7	8	9	10	11	12	13	14	15	16	17	18	19	SSTC	Pts	Ref
2019	COA; 3	COA; 6	TEX	TEX	LBH	LBH	TOR	TOR	MOH	MOH	MOH	MOH	ROA	ROA	ROA	POR	POR	SRF	SRF	15th	37	
2022	LBH	LBH	MOH	MOH	NSH; 4	NSH; 8	BRI	BRI												10th	34	
2023	LBH; 6	LBH; 11	NSH; 5	NSH; 14																8th	48	

^{*} Season in progress.
