= Mid America Off Road Association =

- Sport: Off road racing
- Category: Motorsports
- Jurisdiction: United States
- Abbreviation: MAORA
- Founded: 1972
- Headquarters: P.O. Box 664; Greenup, Illinois 62428
- President: Spencer Rising-Moore
- Secretary: Lyndsey Fasbender
- Other key staff: Vice President: Brian Daffron Treasurer: Debbie Carlen Tech Director: Dave Fasbender

Official website
- www.maoraracing.us

The Mid America Off Road Association (MAORA) is an American off road racing sanctioning. It has sanctioned off road racing events since 1972. Web site www.maoraracing.us

== History ==
MAORA is a non-profit race sanctioning organization. MAORA was created in 1972 to organize off-road enthusiasts and generally promote the sport of off-road racing. MAORA offers two Driver's points series and sets the rules and regulations to be followed by racers, track owners and promoters. Club officers are elected annually by the membership.

== Current Classes ==
MAORA has 2 divisions of classes. One is the "Pro" classes, with the other being "Trophy Classes." The pro classes usually feature the more experienced racers, with more technologically advanced vehicles, whereas the trophy classes feature a "run-what-you-brung" format, meaning almost no rules. The more novice racers generally race in the Trophy classes. The pro classes race for money, while top finishers in the trophy classes receive trophies. Although class descriptions do not say this, all vehicles MUST have approved fuel cells, roll cages, racing seats, and safety belts. All drivers must wear approved safety gear which includes fireproof suits and Snell approved helmets.

Class 7E

With the E standing for Economy, Class 7E is a fairly inexpensive route into off road racing. Very few modifications are allowed, and the trucks still must remain very close to stock. Engine modifications are all but banned, and suspension parts must remain stock, and in stock location. Class 7E is a pro class.

Class 7S

For many, many years, MAORA's Class 7S was reserved for the 6-cylinder mini-trucks. In the early 2000s, MAORA's rules were changed to allow ANY 2-wheel drive pick-up truck to be raced in Class 7s, with no restrictions. is a pro class.

Class 7X

This is MAORA's Trophy Class for mini trucks. As per MAORA rules, Class 7X trucks must remain almost bone stock, with exceptions for safety items, such as the addition of racing seats, roll cages, fuel cells, and battery placement. All suspension pieces must remain stock, as well as all driveline components. They must also retain stock frames, and stock bodies, as well as retaining opening doors.

- Class 10

One of MAORA's newest classes, Class 10 is an almost unlimited buggy class. All that is required is that the engine have no more than 4 cylinders.

- Class 1-2 1600

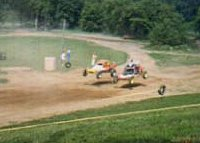
2 Class 1600 is one of the most popular "Pro" classes in all of off-road racing. With most parts being relatively stock, and engine modifications limited, class 16 provides a more level playing field and is a relatively inexpensive class compared to most other forms of motorsports.

== Proposed and former Classes ==
Side by Side

There is a movement in MAORA to start a class of race vehicles designed around popular Side by Side (UTV) vehicles, such as those offered by Yamaha, Polaris, Arctic Cat, and Kawasaki. The class is very popular in other off-road racing series throughout the US.

== Types of Races ==
- Short Course

Short-course racing generally takes place on relatively short (usually under 1 mile) long. The races are a specified number of laps, usually 10. Each class will race 3 "heats." The best average finish in all 3 heats is declared the winner of the event.

- Enduro

Enduro races are the Midwest's answer to desert off-road racing. These events take place on long tracks, usually between 1-mile (1.6 km), and 5 miles (8.0 km) long. These races are run very much like desert races, in that all of the cars are on the track at the same time, but start at different intervals. These races are raced for a period of time, as opposed to being a specified number of laps. A normal Enduro race is 3 hours.

== MAORA Logos ==
One of MAORA's first logos.

A newer MAORA logo featuring the Midwestern states. This was used up until about 2002.

An updated MAORA logo used from 2000-2001.

== See also ==
- Off road racing
- Sandrail
- Dune buggy
- Baja Bug
