= Formula Off Road =

Form of off-road racing 4x4 motorsport

Formula Off Road is a form of off-road racing 4x4 motorsport. It started in Iceland, where it known as "torfæra", gained popularity in the Nordic countries which have a Nordic competition and was introduced to the United States in 2016.

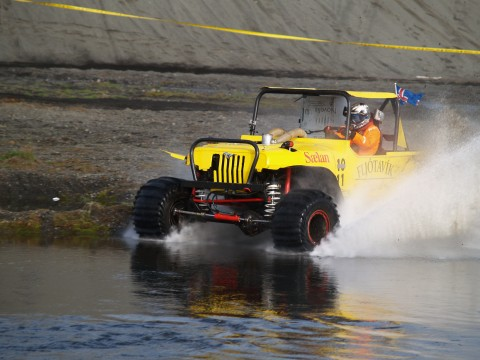
Formula Off Road driving on water

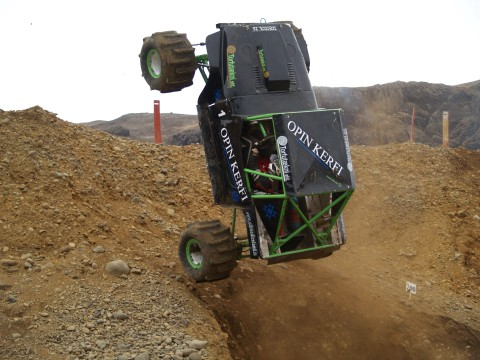
Formula Off Road truck driving up a slope

Formula Off Road is a form of motorsport where drivers compete in precision driving through steep hills and extreme terrain with 4WD vehicles.

== History ==
Formula Off Road originated in Iceland in the 1960s. In the hopes of raising funds, groups of Icelandic rescue workers started to show their 4WD cars in action in the Icelandic hills. It soon became more of a competition between the teams, and soon they started building specially made vehicles for just this purpose.

The story of Formula Off Road began in Iceland May 2, 1965 when the first Formula Off Road competition was hosted by Bifreiðaklúbbur Reykjavíkur (Reykjavik's Car Club), or BKR for short. After that race Egill Gunnar Ingólfsson claimed the title First Winner of Formula Off Road. With that competition, Þorkell Guðnason and fellow members of BKR made the foundation of what we call today a Formula Off Road Championship.

26 January 1980 a national association of racers, Landssamband íslenzkra akstursíþróttamanna (LÍS), was founded. They organized a calendar for formula offroad, made a unified scoring system, managed the national championship and made sure safety protocols are being fulfilled.

At the beginning there was only one class but in 1985 the second class was added to the competition because some of the contestants began to drive with multi-paddle tires. That's when Modified Class and Unlimited Class came to exist. During these years contestants arrived on their daily drive cars, took off the equipment they didn't need in the race itself, changed their tires to multi-paddle and started the race.

Earlier, a roll bar was the only requirement but not the complete roll cage as it is today. In 50 years of Icelandic Formula Off Road there haven't been any serious injuries that can be traced to lack of security measures in the cars.

Formula Off-road competitions have always been a great part of the Icelandic motorsport.

The first Formula Off-road competition abroad was in Sjöbo in Sweden, 29 July 1990. Jeppaklubbur Reykjavíkur organized the competition in cooperation with Wettern Offroaders. Formula Off-road then started to occur regularly in Sweden, Finland, Norway and Denmark.

In 1996 the first Nordic Formula Off Road competition was held. Two Swedes, one Norwegian and several Icelanders competed. From 1997 to 2008 a Nordic tournament was held in Iceland, but 2004 was the first time all Scandinavian countries participated. A competing Nordic tournament was held in the Scandinavian countries in 2000–2008. Those two tournaments where merged in 2009 and organized by FIA north European zone (FIA-NEZ).

On 4 June 2000, there was the first and only Formula Offroad race in Swindon, England. 14 Icelanders, two Swedes and one Norwegian competed on tracks that had more fauna and clay than are usually present in Iceland. As a result, the multi-paddle tyres were removed, and more conventional tyres used instead.

In 2016, 1-2 October, was the first Formula Off-road competition in the Bikini Bottoms Off-Road Park in Tennessee, USA. 16 Icelanders and 4 Americans competed. In 2017 the Icelandic film "Spólað yfir hafið" was released, focusing on the trip of Icelandic off-road drivers to compete in that race. Morgunblaðið gave the film four out of five stars.

July 21, 2018 in Akranes, Iceland, Andrew Blackwood became the first American to compete in Icelandic Formula Offroad Competition driving the Unlimited-class Draumurinn. A car well known in Icelandic competition, Draumurinn (The Dream) is owned by Gestur J. Ingolfsson and is based in Akureyri, Iceland.

== Racing and strategy ==
Formula Off Road is held in several locations for each tournament. Rock mines are a common location. Each location has multiple tracks which are competed on in a single day. Multiple competitions make up a tournament, an national tournament and the Nordic tournament. Each car has multiple assistants acting like mechanics, preparing the car and making repairs during competition.

=== Classes ===
There are currently three competing classes in Formula Off Road:

- Street Legal Class - Equipped with lights, license plates and subject to annual inspection these vehicles are road-safe and often street driven just as they are raced.
- Modified Class - the shape of the body must resemble a mass-produced vehicle. Bonnet, side body panels, and front and rear fenders must be installed and resemble the original vehicle.
- Unlimited Class - the major league class

The difference between the classes is mainly in the tyres. Unlimited Class 4x4s are allowed to use paddle tyres which dig into the earth between hops.

The two classes compete on similar tracks. For both classes the length of body must at least cover the wheelbase of the vehicle.

=== Risks ===
Racing cars can flip over and roll down the side of the hill. Suspension and drive shaft failures are commonly seen in races. The drivers are protected by a roll cage, a full-face helmet with neck support, five-point harnesses, a homologated bucket seat, flame resistant overalls, shoes and gloves, special arm restraints and other safety measures as required by the rules.

Spectators can sometimes be pelted with sand, earth or small stones kicked up by the rear tires.

=== Point system ===
Drivers are ranked by accumulated points. Points are awarded in a similar way to other types of motorsport.

Each driver has to go as far as they can and gets no help from the team during the attempt. Stopping incurs a penalty of 10 points. Backing up is allowed but incurs a 40-point penalty. Touching a marker is 20 penalty points. Driving over a marker is 50 points or 100 if only one wheel is still on the course. Faults at the final gate incur only half as many points. Winners score 20 points, with 15 for second place, 12 for third and fewer for each subsequent place. On each track a driver can earn up to 350 points depending on how far they go or if they get any points deducted for faults.

Timed courses give points according to time. The fastest time set scores 350 points. Other drivers are deducted 1 point for every 1/10th of a second slower than the fastest time. The highest total number of points wins.

There is often also a special award given for the most spectacular driving in each class. There is not a lot of money in the sport and the winner only gets a medal and a cup.

Each competition is held in accordance with the FIA International Sporting Code (ISC) and has six to eight tracks.

== Vehicles ==
The Formula Off Road style 4x4 is highly modified. A typical example usually has the following modifications:

- Locked front and rear differentials as well as the centre transfer case.
- Gear-ratios are lowered and usually have slightly higher ratios up front. This makes the front wheels turn a little faster and makes the vehicle easier to steer in the extreme situations.
- Engines are eight-cylinder petrol engines. A nitrous system gives an extra couple of hundred bhp when the pedal is floored. Recent seasons (as of 2018) have seen more and more variants with fast spooling turbochargers instead, also making non-V8 base engines viable like the Honda K24 or Volvo T5.
- An automatic transmission with a torque converter with a stall speed of about 5,000rpm. Driveline kicks in around 5,000rpm.
- Sand drag tyres for maximum traction. The Unlimited Class allows the use of paddle tyres that are built on racing slicks with the paddles welded on. The Modified Street Class uses die-cast sand drag tyres with slightly smaller shovels.
- Suspension is made to accommodate fast changing surfaces. The older trucks have coil springs while newer trucks have air springs that are easier to adjust according to each track. A new type of suspension is also being tested by at least one contestant. It's similar to your typical motorcycle, where the shock absorber and the suspension arm is built into a single unit.
- A specially built roll cage is required for all vehicles.
- Steering is hydraulic and not allowed on the street.

== See also ==
- Baja SAE, a similar competition between university teams
