= 2019 Stadium Super Trucks =

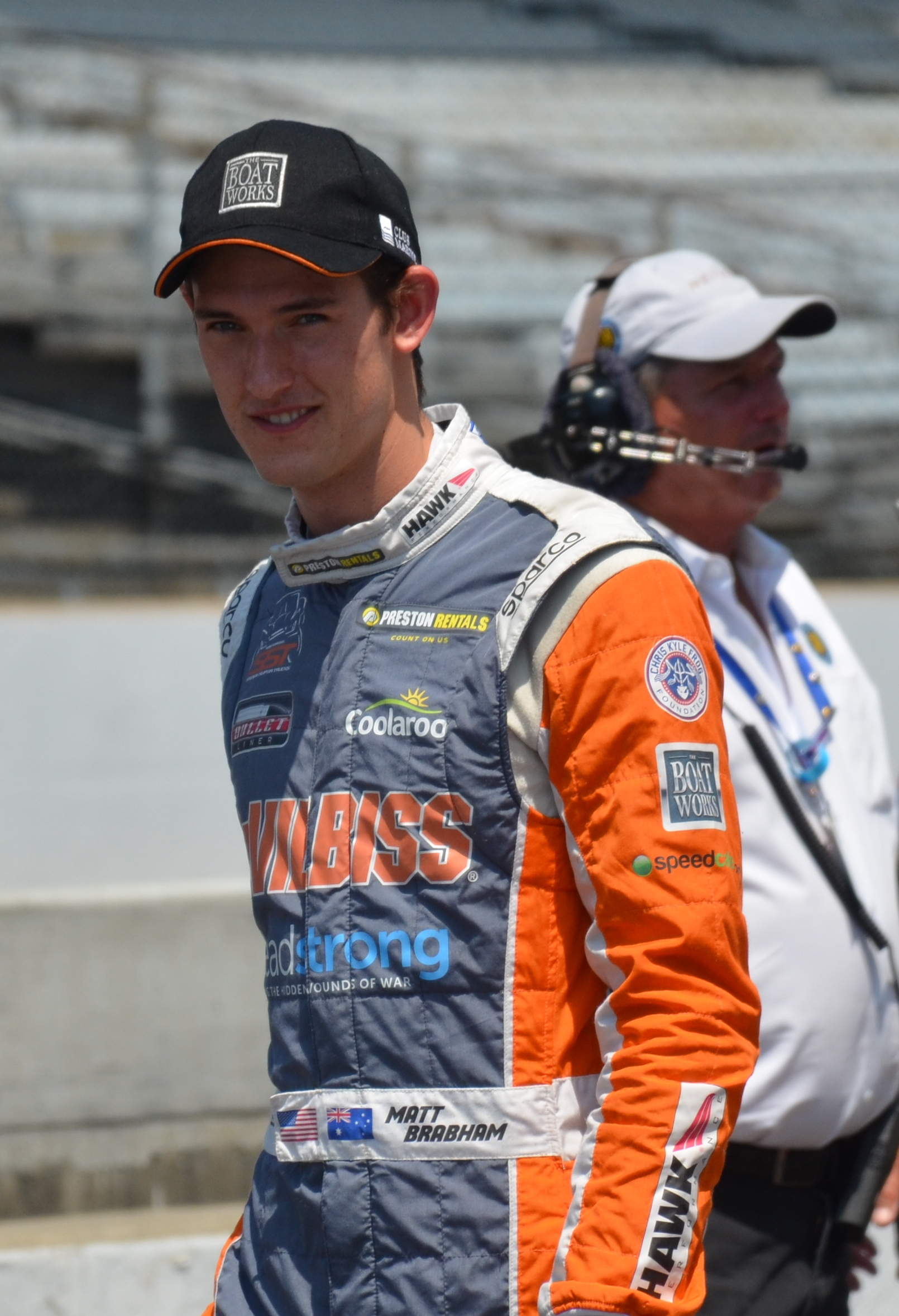
Matthew Brabham, the 2019 champion

The 2019 Speed Energy Stadium Super Trucks were the seventh season of the Stadium Super Trucks series. Defending champion Matthew Brabham retained his title with a five-win season and a 54-point advantage over runner-up Robby Gordon.

The 2019 season saw the return of the trucks to Australia to finish the year, ending a year-long ban on the series by the Confederation of Australian Motor Sport (CAMS). This eventually led to the creation of the Boost Mobile Super Trucks championship for the 2020 season.

== Drivers ==
No.	Driver	Races
2	(United States) Sheldon Creed	3–6
7	(United States) Robby Gordon	All
9	(Japan) E. J. Chiba	5–6
16	(United States) Greg Biffle	16–19
21	(Australia) Matt Nolan	18–19
22	(United States) Zach Van Matre	5–6
25	(United States) Casey Mears	7–8, 11–12
25	(Netherlands) Arie Luyendyk Jr.	9–10
39	(Australia) Russell Ingall	18–19
43	(United States) Ryan Eversley	7–8
44	(United States) John Holtger	13–15
47	(United States) Jeff Hoffman	1–17
51	(United States) Ryan Beat	1–2
55	(United States) Gavin Harlien	All
57	(United States) Bill Hynes	All
60	(United States) Travis PeCoy	1–2
60	(United States) Cole Potts	5–19
67	(Australia) Paul Morris	18–19
68	(United States) Blade Hildebrand	1–6
83	(Australia) Matthew Brabham	All
87	(Australia) Toby Price	18–19
93	(Canada) Russell Boyle	7–8
100	(United States) Greg Biffle	9–10
100	(United States) Ryan Eversley	11–12
100	(United States) Christopher Polvoorde	13–15
2020	(United States) Sheldon Creed	16–17
2021	(United States) Casey Mears	16–17
Sources: (Note: Sorted by round: Austin (Races 1–2); Texas (Races 3–4); Long Beach (Races 5–6); Toronto (Races 7–8); Mid-Ohio 1 (Races 9–10); Mid-Ohio 2 (Races 11–12); Road America (Races 13–15); Portland (Races 16–17); Surfers Paradise (Races 18–19))

== Schedule ==
Round	Track	Location	Date	Supporting
1	Circuit of the Americas	Austin, Texas	March 23–24	IndyCar Classic
2	Texas Motor Speedway	Fort Worth, Texas	March 31	O'Reilly Auto Parts 500
3	Long Beach Street Circuit	Long Beach, California	April 13–14	Grand Prix of Long Beach
4	Exhibition Place	(Canada) Toronto, Ontario	July 13–14	Honda Indy Toronto
5	Mid-Ohio Sports Car Course	Lexington, Ohio	July 27–28	Honda Indy 200
6	Mid-Ohio Sports Car Course	Lexington, Ohio	August 9–10	B&L Transport 170
7	Road America	Elkhart Lake, Wisconsin	August 23–24	CTECH Manufacturing 180
8	Portland International Raceway	Portland, Oregon	August 31–September 1	Grand Prix of Portland
9	Surfers Paradise Street Circuit	(Australia) Surfers Paradise, Queensland	October 26–27	Gold Coast 600

== Season summary ==
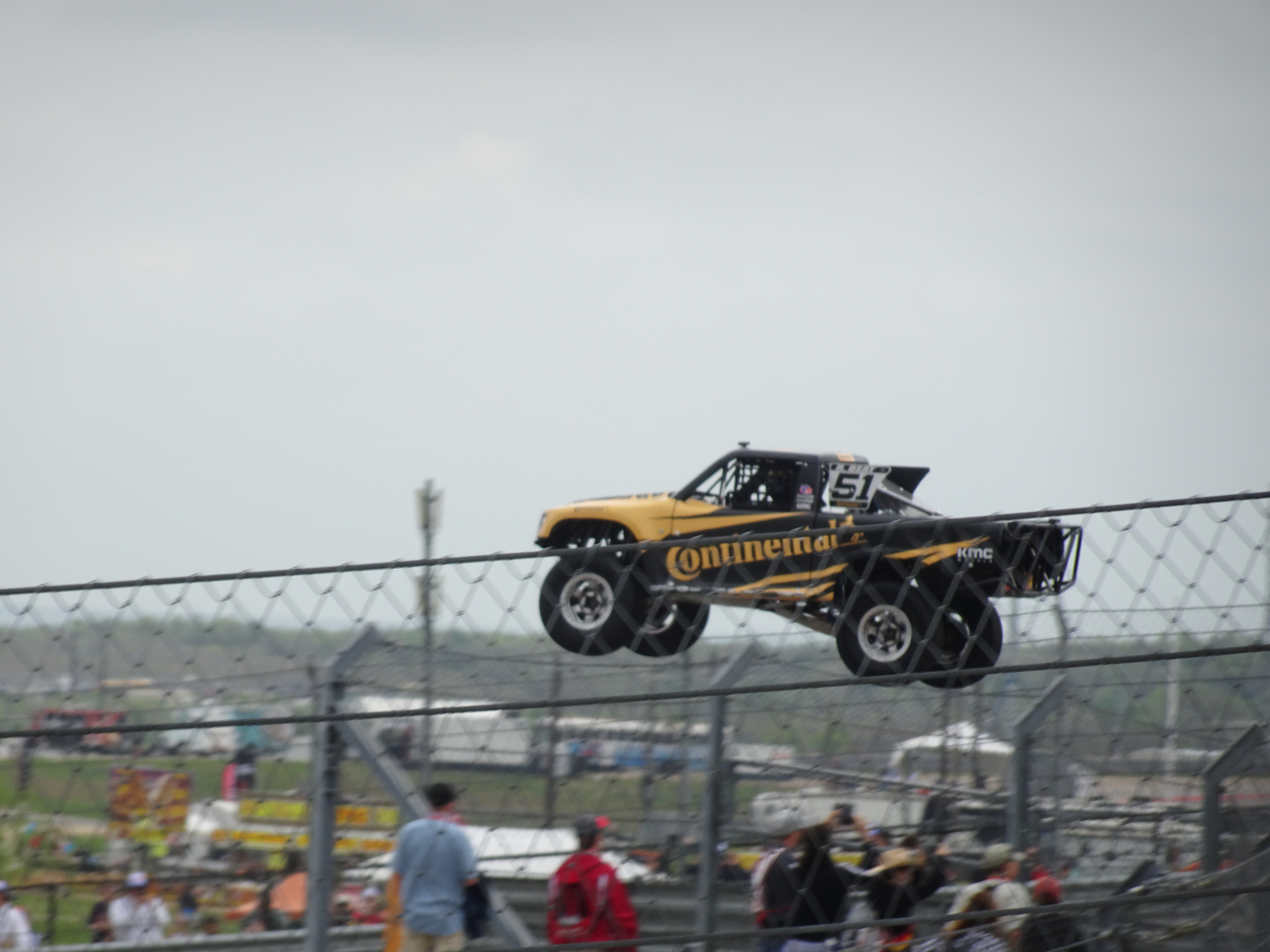
Ryan Beat jumping the Continental Tire truck after turn 1 at Circuit of the Americas

The 2019 season began at the Circuit of the Americas in Austin, running as a support event to the IndyCar Series' IndyCar Classic. Continental AG's Continental Tire brand made its SST debut during the weekend, providing the TerrainContact A/T tire for four drivers and fielding a truck for Ryan Beat; two-time SST champion Sheldon Creed, NASCAR veteran Greg Biffle, and sports car driver Ryan Eversley also drove the truck during the season. Blade Hildebrand and Matthew Brabham won the weekend's races, the former recording his first career SST victory.

A week later, the series remained in Texas to join the Monster Energy NASCAR Cup Series' O'Reilly Auto Parts 500 weekend at Texas Motor Speedway; it was SST's first weekend as an undercard to strictly NASCAR events, and the third consecutive season it raced at the track. SST's racing, dubbed the Outdoor Powersports Offroad Rumble, saw Creed win both races. In the first event, Brabham, Robby Gordon, and Jeff Hoffman were involved in a wreck that saw the trio roll over on the ramp. The following race featured Bill Hynes rolling onto a barrier for a red flag; shortly after the event was halted, Gordon nearly collided with a safety vehicle attending to Hynes' truck, but braked on time; Gordon explained his radio with race officials had failed.

At Long Beach, Baja 1000 racer and SST test driver Zach Van Matre made his series debut, while Japanese driver E. J. Chiba returned to SST for the first time since Texas in 2018. In the first race, Brabham battled with Creed for the win, with the former securing the position with two laps left and holding on to the win. Gordon won the second round.

In July, the series returned to Honda Indy Toronto for the first time since 2016. NASCAR driver Casey Mears and Canadian driver Russell Boyle ran their first race of the year, while Eversley made his SST debut. Cole Potts won the first round after it was shortened due to weather, while Gavin Harlien won the second; with two second-place finishes, Brabham claimed the overall weekend victory.

On July 27–28, SST competed at Mid-Ohio Sports Car Course for the first time, with Biffle and series veteran Arie Luyendyk Jr. making their first starts of the season. Biffle and Harlien battled for much of the first race before the latter fell back with mechanical issues. On the final restart, Potts took the lead from Biffle to win the round. Harlien started on the pole for the second race and led every lap. The series returned to the track two weeks later to support the NASCAR Xfinity Series' B&L Transport 170. Gordon won the Friday round and Brabham on Saturday.

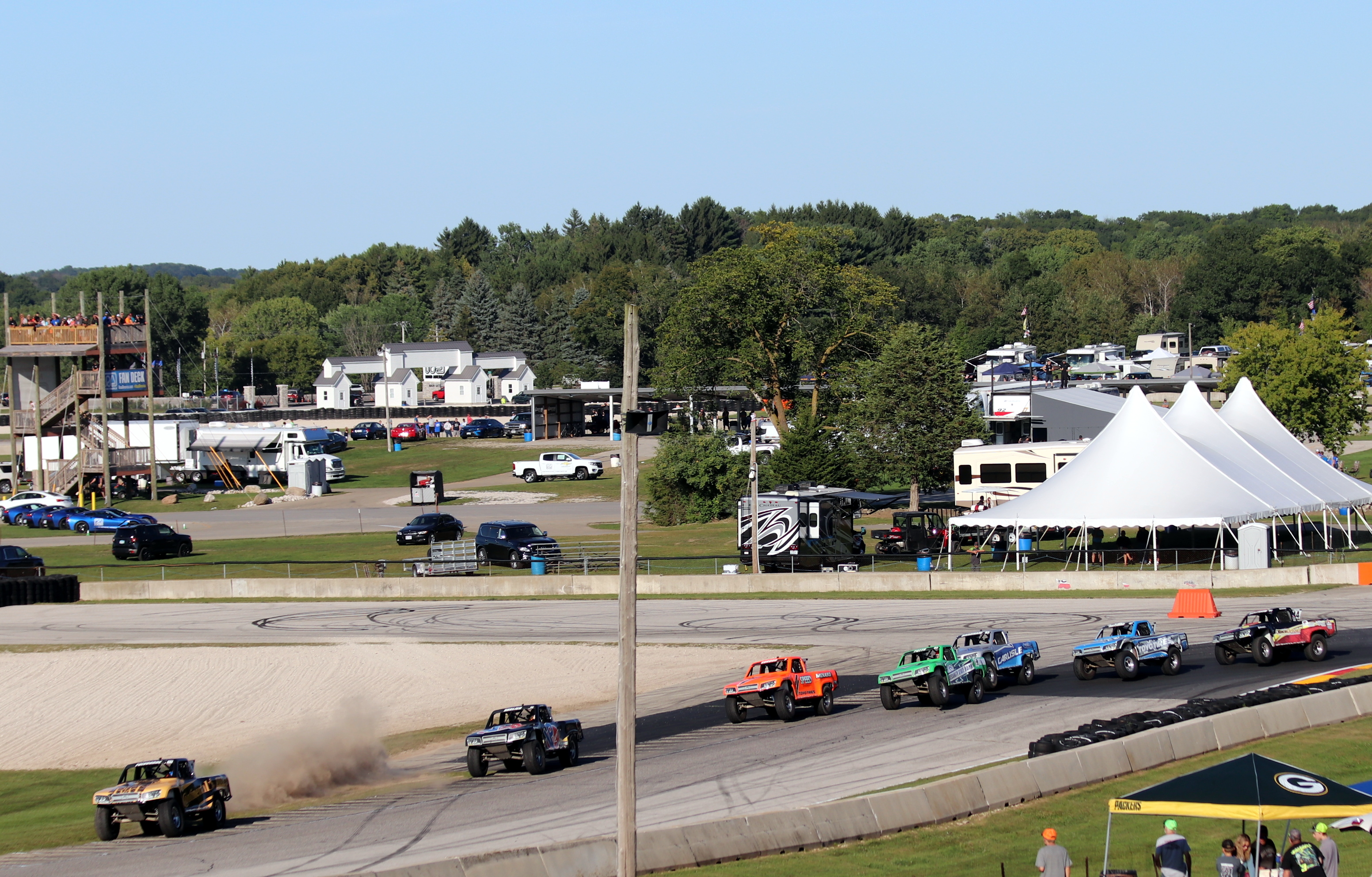
Field of trucks in Round 15 at Road America

At Road America, a pair of off-road racers in 14-year-old John Holtger and 19-year-old Christopher Polvoorde made their SST debuts. In the first race, Brabham made contact with Harlien on the final lap that sent the two into a spin that Potts capitalized on to win. Brabham and Harlien were involved in further battles in the second round until the former exited with mechanical failure, with the latter winning the second and third races.

Nine drivers, including four with stock car racing experience (Creed, Gordon, Harlien, and Mears), ran the Portland International Raceway weekend with IndyCar. Creed, in his first SST race since Long Beach, won the first round, while Brabham won race two. Kevin Savoree, head of Grand Prix of Portland organizer Green Savoree Racing Promotions, described the series as being a "fan favorite" that helped raise interest in the weekend.

In late October, SST returned to Australia for the Gold Coast 600 weekend at Surfers Paradise Street Circuit, consummating an agreement formed between the series and the Confederation of Australian Motor Sport (CAMS) to lift the latter's ban on the former in 2018. Reigning Dakar Rally champion Toby Price, Aussie Racing Cars driver Matt Nolan, former Supercars Championship winner Russell Ingall, and 2017 series champion Paul Morris returned to the series for the weekend, while Biffle joined for his first racing in Australia. In the first race, Price dominated by leading nearly every lap from the pole but was spun by Brabham in turn 11 on the final lap, leading to Gordon taking the win. The second race saw Morris battle with Potts for much of the event before the two collided at the white lap, which Brabham capitalized on to win.

== Results and standings ==
=== Race results ===
Round	Race	Event	Fastest qualifier	Pole position	Most laps led	Winning driver	Ref
1	1	Austin	(Australia) Matthew Brabham	(United States) Travis PeCoy	(United States) Blade Hildebrand	(United States) Blade Hildebrand	
1	2	Austin	(Australia) Matthew Brabham	(United States) Gavin Harlien	(United States) Gavin Harlien	(Australia) Matthew Brabham	
2	3	Texas	(United States) Jeff Hoffman	(United States) Bill Hynes	(United States) Sheldon Creed	(United States) Sheldon Creed	
2	4	Texas	(United States) Jeff Hoffman	(United States) Robby Gordon	(United States) Sheldon Creed	(United States) Sheldon Creed	
3	5	Long Beach	(United States) Sheldon Creed	(Japan) E. J. Chiba	(United States) Sheldon Creed (Australia) Matthew Brabham	(Australia) Matthew Brabham	
3	6	Long Beach	(United States) Sheldon Creed	(United States) Blade Hildebrand	(United States) Robby Gordon	(United States) Robby Gordon	
4	7	Toronto	(Australia) Matthew Brabham	(United States) Casey Mears	(United States) Cole Potts	(United States) Cole Potts	
4	8	Toronto	(Australia) Matthew Brabham	(United States) Ryan Eversley	(United States) Gavin Harlien	(United States) Gavin Harlien	
5	9	Mid-Ohio (IndyCar)	(Australia) Matthew Brabham	(United States) Bill Hynes	(United States) Gavin Harlien	(United States) Cole Potts	
5	10	Mid-Ohio (IndyCar)	(Australia) Matthew Brabham	(United States) Gavin Harlien	(United States) Gavin Harlien	(United States) Gavin Harlien	
6	11	Mid-Ohio (NASCAR)	(Australia) Matthew Brabham	(United States) Bill Hynes	(United States) Casey Mears	(United States) Robby Gordon	
6	12	Mid-Ohio (NASCAR)	(Australia) Matthew Brabham	(United States) Bill Hynes	(Australia) Matthew Brabham	(Australia) Matthew Brabham	
7	13	Road America	(United States) Jeff Hoffman	(United States) John Holtger	(United States) Cole Potts (Australia) Matthew Brabham (United States) Gavin Harlien (United States) Robby Gordon	(United States) Cole Potts	
7	14	Road America	(United States) Jeff Hoffman	(United States) John Holtger	(United States) Gavin Harlien	(United States) Gavin Harlien	
7	15	Road America	(United States) Jeff Hoffman	(United States) John Holtger	(United States) Robby Gordon	(United States) Gavin Harlien	
8	16	Portland	(United States) Sheldon Creed	(United States) Bill Hynes	(United States) Sheldon Creed	(United States) Sheldon Creed	
8	17	Portland	(United States) Sheldon Creed	(United States) Jeff Hoffman	(Australia) Matthew Brabham	(Australia) Matthew Brabham	
9	18	Surfers Paradise	(United States) Robby Gordon	(Australia) Toby Price	(Australia) Toby Price	(United States) Robby Gordon	
9	19	Surfers Paradise	(United States) Robby Gordon	(United States) Cole Potts	(Australia) Paul Morris	(Australia) Matthew Brabham	

=== Drivers' championship ===
Rank	Driver	(Texas) COA		(Texas) TEX		(California) LBH		(Canada) TOR		(Ohio) MOH				(Wisconsin) ROA			(Oregon) POR		(Australia) SRF		Points
1	(Australia) Matthew Brabham	6	1	5	2	1*	2	2	2	3	2	7	1*	3*	8	4	5	1*	2	1	476
2	(United States) Robby Gordon	2	5	7	**3**	9	1*	3	4	4	6	1	4	2*	6	3*	4	4	1	4	422
3	(United States) Gavin Harlien	8	**3***	3	4	4	3	7	1*	8*	**1***	6	8	5*	1*	1	2	5	3	10	402
4	(United States) Cole Potts	Rpl^{†}	Rpl^{†}			5	7	1*	3	1	5	4	3	1*	2	2	6	2	9	**7**	362
5	(United States) Jeff Hoffman	7	2	6	5	3	5	4	9	5	3	5	2	**6**	**4**	**5**	9	**3**			307
6	(United States) Bill Hynes	5	7	**4**	7	6	9	8	5	**7**	7	**8**	**7**	7	5	8	**8**	9	7	3	275
7	(United States) Sheldon Creed			1*	1*	2*	4										1*	6			179
8	(United States) Blade Hildebrand	1*	4	2	6	10	**6**														114
9	(United States) Greg Biffle									2	4						3	8	4	8	105
10	(United States) Casey Mears							**6**	7			2*	5				7	7			100
11	(United States) Ryan Eversley							9	**8**			3	6								61
12	(United States) Christopher Polvoorde													4	3	6					54
13	(United States) John Holtger													**8**	**7**	**7**					41
14	(Australia) Paul Morris																		8	2*	38
15	(United States) Ryan Beat	3	6																		37
16	(Australia) Toby Price																		**6***	5	34
17	(Australia) Russell Ingall																		5	6	31
18	(Canada) Russell Boyle							5	6												31
19	(Netherlands) Arie Luyendyk Jr.									6	8										28
20	(Japan) E. J. Chiba					**8**	8														26
21	(United States) Zach Van Matre					7	10														25
22	(Australia) Matt Nolan																		10	9	24
	(United States) Travis PeCoy	**4**^{†}	8^{†}																		
Rank	Driver	(Texas) COA		(Texas) TEX		(California) LBH		(Canada) TOR		(Ohio) MOH				(Wisconsin) ROA			(Oregon) POR		(Australia) SRF		Points

Legend
Color	Result
Gold	Winner
Silver	2nd place
Bronze	3rd place
Green	4th–5th place (Top 5)
Light Blue	6th–10th place (Top 10)
Dark Blue	Finished (Outside Top 10)
Purple	Did not finish (DNF)
Red	Did not qualify (DNQ)
Brown	Withdrew (Wth)
Black	Disqualified (DSQ)
White	Did not start (DNS)
White	Race cancelled or abandoned (C)
Blank	Did not participate (DNP)
Blank	Driver replacement (Rpl)
Blank	Race not held (NH)
Blank	Not competing

**In-line notation**
**Bold**	Pole position (1 point; except Indy)
Italics	Ran fastest race lap
^{L}	Led race lap (1 point)
*	Led most race laps (2 points)
^{1–12}	Indy 500 "Fast Twelve" bonus points
^{c}	Qualifying canceled (no bonus point)
RY	Rookie of the Year
R	Rookie

Points	Position														
Points	1st	2nd	3rd	4th	5th	6th	7th	8th	9th	10th	11th	12th	13th	14th	15th
Heat	12	10	8	7	5	4	3	2	1						
Final	25	22	20	18	16	15	14	13	12	11	10	9	8	7	6

Bonuses
Most laps led	3
Position gained	1
Fastest qualifier	1

==== Driver replacements ====
Key	No.	Original driver	Replacement driver	Race	Ref
†	60	Cole Potts	Travis PeCoy	Austin	
All points scored by the replacement went to the original driver.
