= Off-road racing =

Format of racing

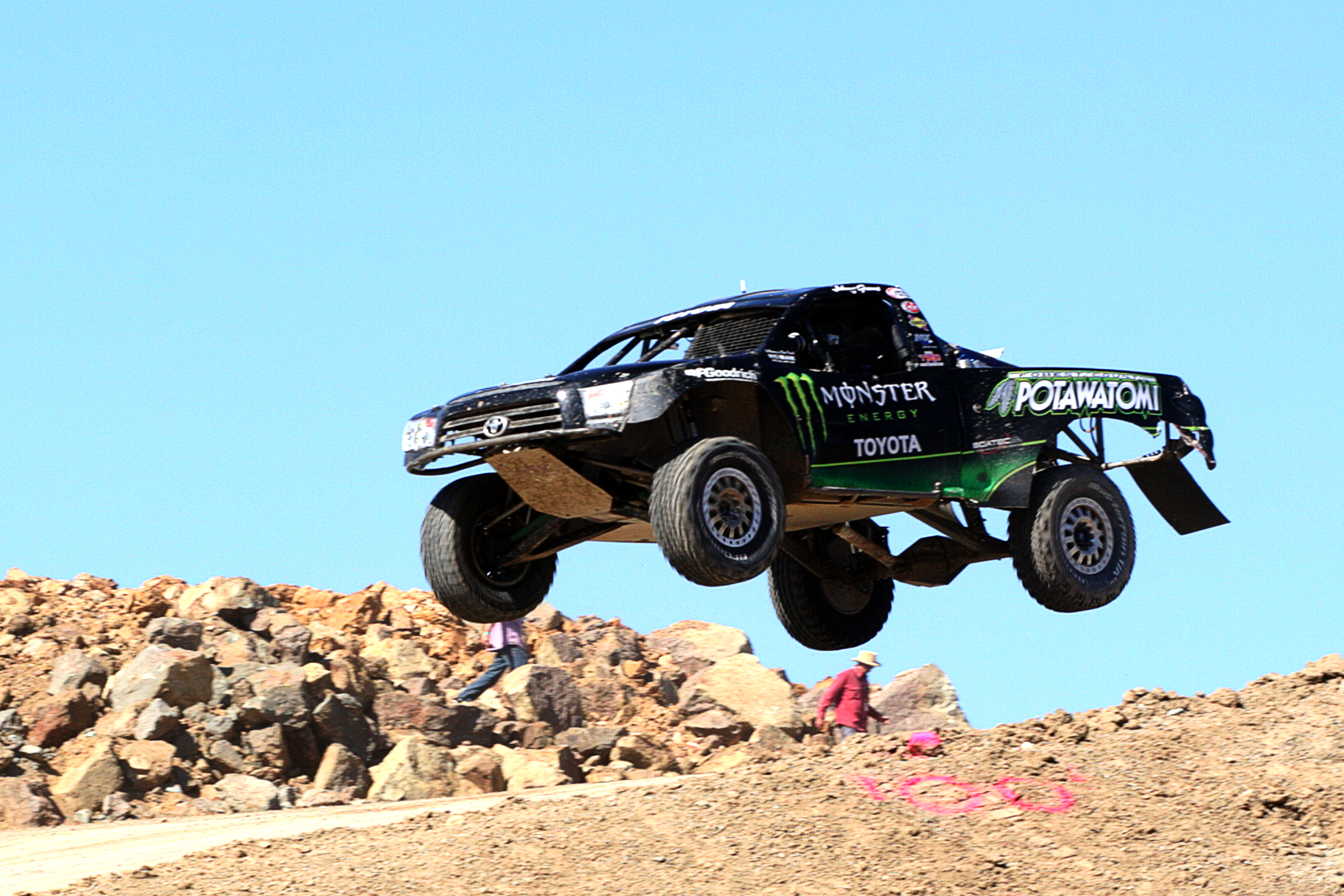
- Johnny Greaves off-road truck at a 2007 CORR event

Characteristics
- Mixed-sex: Yes
- Type: Outdoor, Motorsports racing

Presence
- Olympic: No
- Paralympic: No

Off-road racing is a form of motorsports consisting of specially-modified vehicles including cars, SUVs, trucks, motorbikes, quadbikes and buggies racing in off-road environments (e.g. snow, dirt, mud, etc.).

== North America ==
=== Desert racing ===
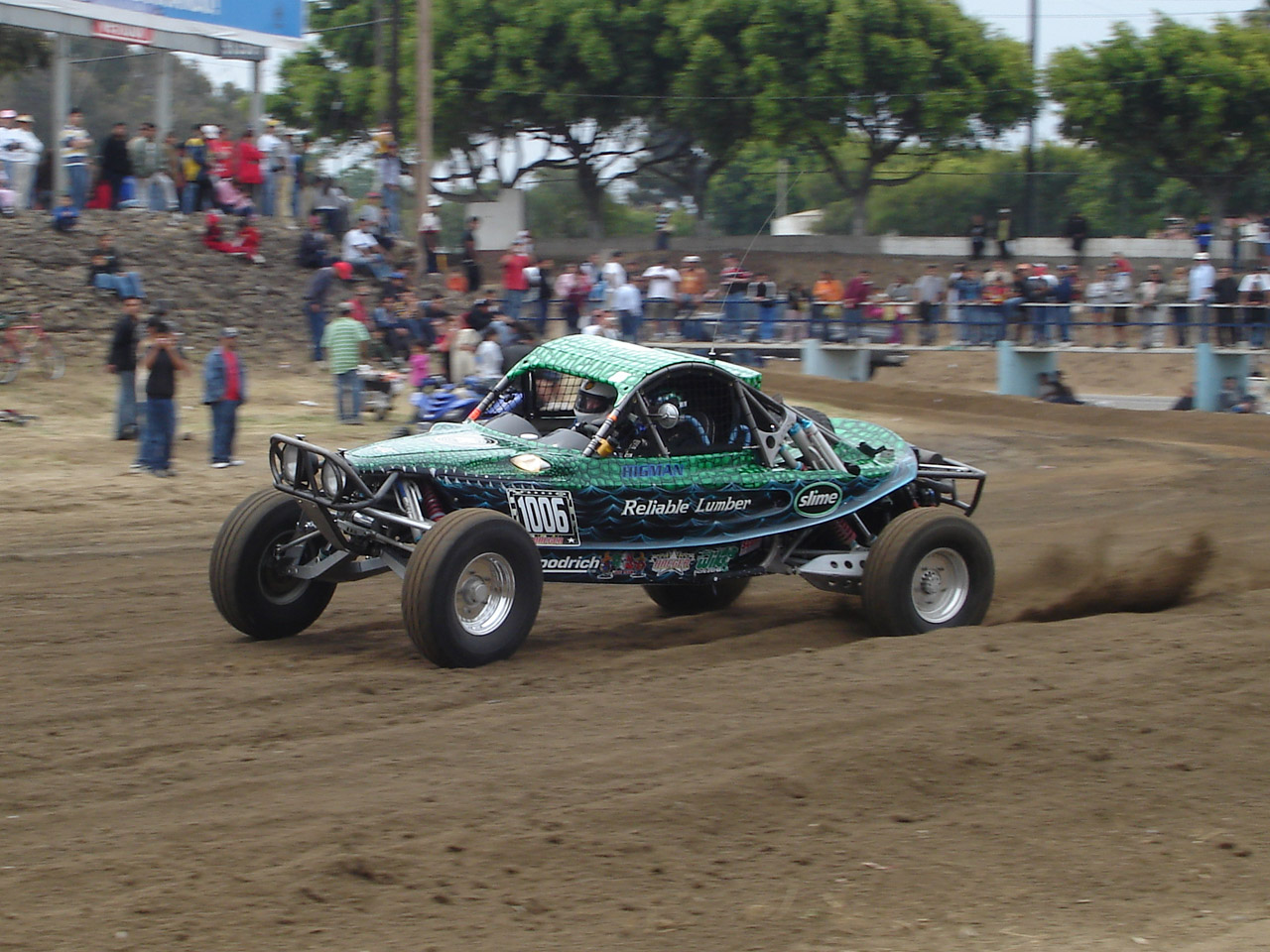
2007 Baja 500

Desert racing began in the early 20th century. An early racing sanctioning body in North America was the National Off-Road Racing Association (NORRA) co-founded in 1967 by Ed Pearlman. The first event was a race across the Mexican desert, south-eastwards through most of the length of Baja California, originally from Ensenada to La Paz. The event was first called the Mexican 1000, and it later became known as the Baja 1000. The event is now sanctioned by SCORE International.

Most desert races are set up on government recreational land and have tracks that run anywhere from 25 to 1000 miles. Various classes of vehicles run a different number of laps depending on the size of the engine or the set-up of the suspension system. Currently, there are several smaller series. One of the most popular is the Best in the Desert series, which is known for the Vegas to Reno race (the longest off-road race in the US with the 2009 Vegas to Reno race measuring 1000 miles).

The Mojave Off-Road Racing Enthusiast (MORE) series started in 1997 as a small, family-oriented race series. MORE uses tracks set up on desert land in the Barstow and Lucerne Valley regions of the Mojave Desert in California. Mojave Desert Racing series has drawn many competitors from the now defunct CORR races.

On August 14, 2010, a modified Ford Ranger pickup truck, racing in the MDR sanctioned "California 200", careened off the track into a group of spectators, killing eight, and raising questions about the future of off-road racing on public lands.

King of the Hammers is one of the most popular desert races and it was started in 2007 by Dave Cole and Jeff Knoll.

=== Short course racing ===
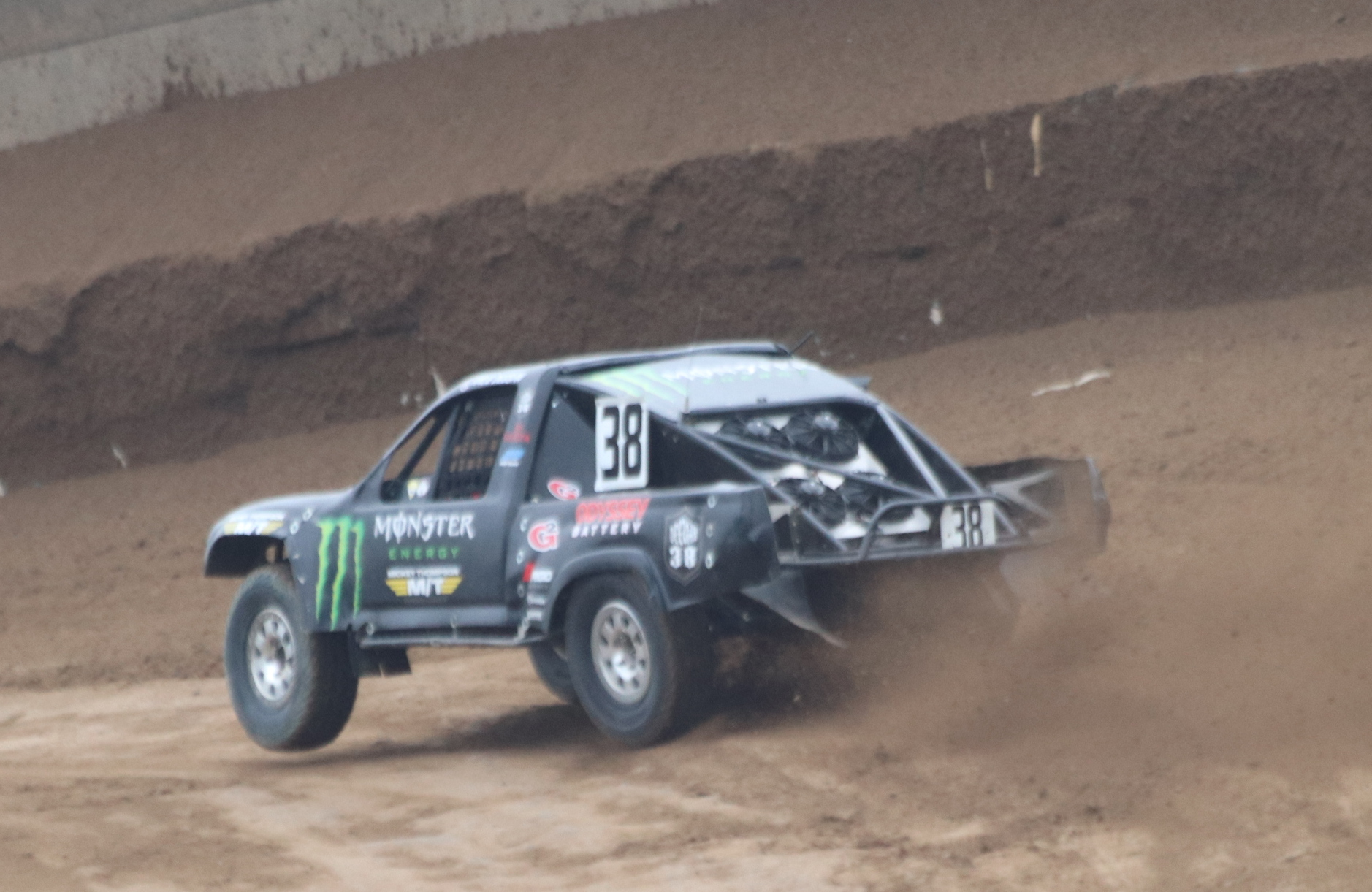
Hailie Deegan racing in Pro Lite at Crandon in 2018

Short course off-road racing is held on a circuit of less than five miles (such as Crandon International Off-Road Raceway). The races involve left and right turns of various radii, jumps, and occasional washboard runs and gravel pits. Another format made popular by the Mickey Thompson Entertainment Group was called stadium racing, where off-road racing vehicles were used in a temporary off-road racetrack constructed inside a stadium. The U.S. Off Road Championship Series was held by Pace Motorsports in the late 90s and shown on TNN Motor Madness. In 2012, Robby Gordon created the Stadium Super Trucks, an offshoot of the Micky Thompson Entertainment Group; after racing primarily in stadiums and off-road courses during its inaugural season in 2013, the series has since placed more emphasis on asphalt tracks like street circuits and road courses.

A simpler, shorter track format is popular at many county fairs, and is called Tough (or Tuff) Truck competition. These tracks are ordinarily much shorter and feature individual, timed runs.

During the 2010s, there were two major organizations promoting short course off road racing in the United States. The TORC: The Off Road Championship, derived from series racing in the Midwestern United States, promoted races in Eastern, Midwestern, and some Western venues before cancelling all events in 2018. The Lucas Oil Off Road Racing Series (LOORRS) focused on promoting events mainly on the West Coast until its closure in 2020. Both series featured professional off-road drivers and race teams.

There are also several grassroots organizations, one of the longest-tenured being the Mid America Off Road Association, which promotes short course off-road racing in Illinois, Indiana, and Ohio.

=== Other formats ===
The general idea of off-road racing can also extend to include hillclimbing or any other form of racing that does not occur on a specified, paved track. The Frozen Rush features off-road trophy trucks racing on snowy ski slopes. Among drivers, the Pikes Peak International Hill Climb is one of the oldest and most popular hillclimbs in the United States.

== New Zealand ==
In New Zealand, off-road racing runs its own class structure and has a multiple-round national championship. Its flagship event, the two-day, 1000 km Taupo 1000, is a stand-alone international endurance race which is currently held every other year. The event started life in 1992, as the "made for television" Bridgestone 1000. The original Bridgestone 1000 was held over two days, in a large man made forest located outside the resort town of Taupo. There were six laps of 160km each. The event was open to motorcycles, quad bikes, offroad race cars, SUVs and rally cars. The Bridgestone 1000 was the first Offroad Endurance Race in New Zealand to include teams from Australia, New Zealand and the USA.

== Europe ==
In Europe, "off-road racing" refers to events on unsealed circuits such as autocross or rallycross. European "bajas" are types of Cross-Country Rallies. Beach racing events are also held predominately in northern Europe.

In Scandinavian countries, "off-road" racing can refer to a type of motorsport known as Formula Off Road, which involves driving extensively modified vehicles through a difficult course up an uphill terrain.

There are many other type of races in Europe. Most Eastern Europe countries have their own National Offroad Championships and many other races from 1 day to 7 days .

== Australia ==
Australian off-road racing has a similar format to North America, involving various classes of highly-modified vehicles with differing level of engine and physical restrictions racing anywhere from 20-600 kilometres usually over a weekend. It differs in format to North America due to its high use of private land and class restrictions. Multiple series currently exist in both national, state and club forms, often decreasing in track and weekend-total length down that order. Two organisations individually cover and organise the majority of events, them being Motorsport Australia and Australian Auto Sport Alliance; these separate organisations involve licensing, permits, funds handling and timing in their roles, among many more.

=== Classes ===
Off-road vehicles in Australia are organised into classes to organise and improve competition. The below information is according to the specifications of Australian Off Road Racing Australia. The first class is the 'Pro' or 'Unlimited' Class, buggies and truggies limited to an engine capacity of 6000cc, inclusive of adjusting factors due to turbo charging or other correction factors. These are generally the fastest cars in events. Next is Class 1, or 'Pro-Lites', them being buggies and truggies having an engine restriction of 3500cc naturally-aspirated. After that is Class 2, commonly known as Super 1650's, are buggies and truggies with two crew members and sport an engine restriction of 1650cc naturally aspirated, inclusive of correction factors. Next is Class 3, a more uncommon class of buggies and truggies with two crew members and an engine restriction of 1330cc inclusive of correction factors. After that is Class 4, involving automobiles that comply with the Wild 2WD technical regulations and are limited to an engine capacity of 6000cc, inclusive of correction factors. Next is Class 5, involving two-crew automobiles complying with the Power 2WD technical regulations and limited to an engine capacity the same as Class 4. After that is Class 6, two-crew automobiles that comply with the Super PRV technical regulations and are limited to an engine capacity between 1201cc and 2050cc, inclusive of correction factors. Next is Class 66, similar to Class 6 but limited to 1200cc naturally-aspirated. After that is Class 7, two-crew automobiles that comply with the Stock 4WD technical regulations and are limited to an engine capacity of 6000cc, inclusive of correction factors. Next is Class 8, including automobiles that comply with the Super 4WD technical regulations and have an engine capacity of 6000cc inclusive of correction factors. Finally is Class 10, buggies and truggies that comply with the Wild 2WD technical regulations and are limited to an engine capacity of 2500cc naturally-aspirated.

=== Popular races ===
The most popular off-road race in Australia is the Finke Desert Race near Alice Springs, Northern Territory. It involves a 460km-long race to the small community of Aptula (Finke) and back again, racing alongside what was the Old Ghan railway for a large portion. Many years after its inception in 1976, it now boasts media coverage and a large field contending for the title of the 'King of the Desert'.

== See also ==
- Off-road Motorsports Hall of Fame
- Desert racing
- Beach racing
