= King of the Hammers =

Off-road race in Johnson Valley, California, US

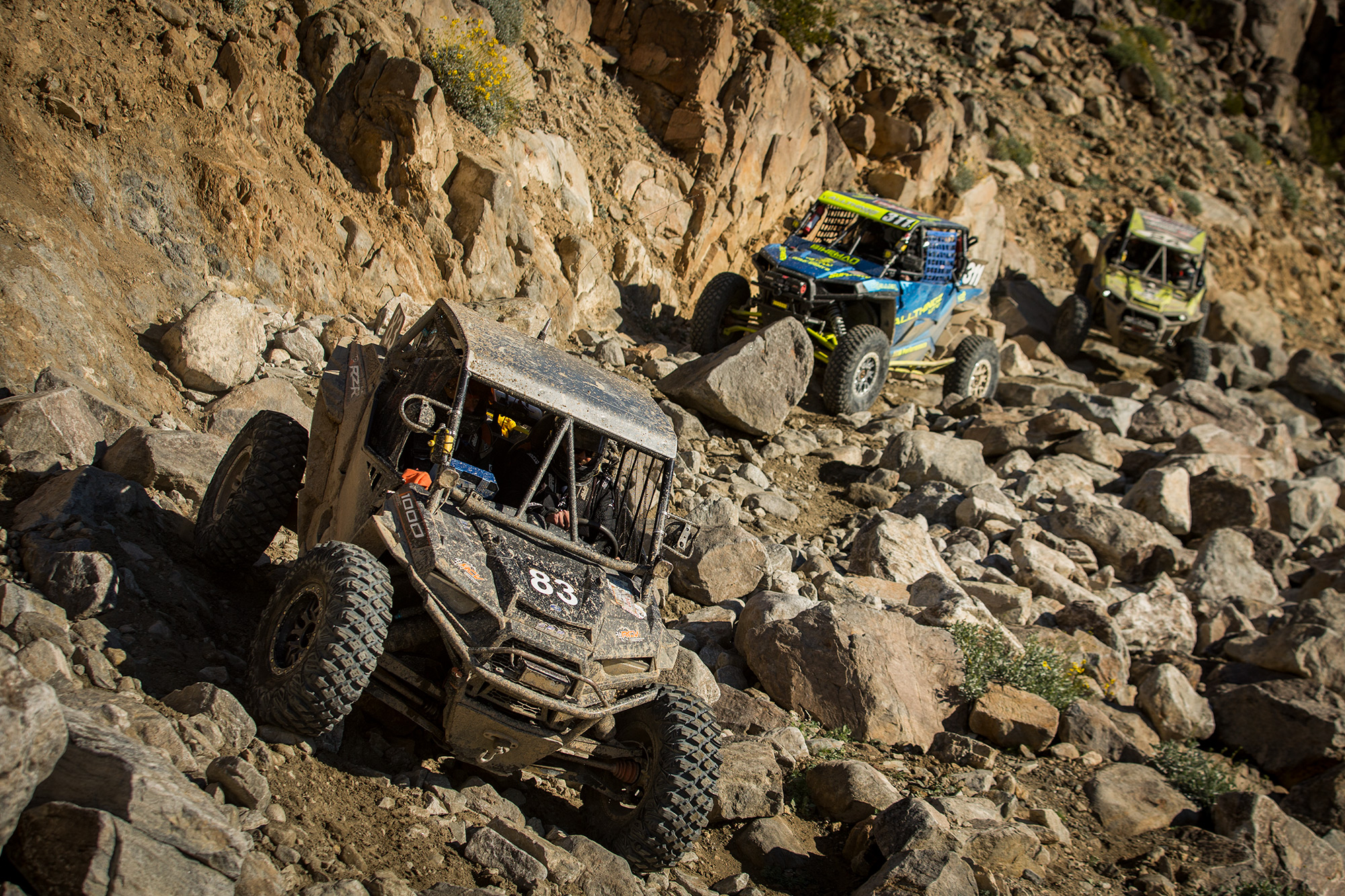
King of the Hammers 2019

King of the Hammers is an off-road race that combines desert racing and rock crawling. This race is held in February on Means Dry Lake at Johnson Valley, California, United States. The race is broadcast live on Ultra 4 Racing's website. King of The Hammers race week has expanded from one race. It is now a series of five races that run throughout the week. The races include a Can AM UTV event on Sunday, the ULTRA4 vs. Rock Bouncer shootout on Monday, the Every Man Challenge Race on Wednesday, and the Toyo Desert Invitational (Unlimited Trophy Trucks) on Thursday.

== Hammertown ==
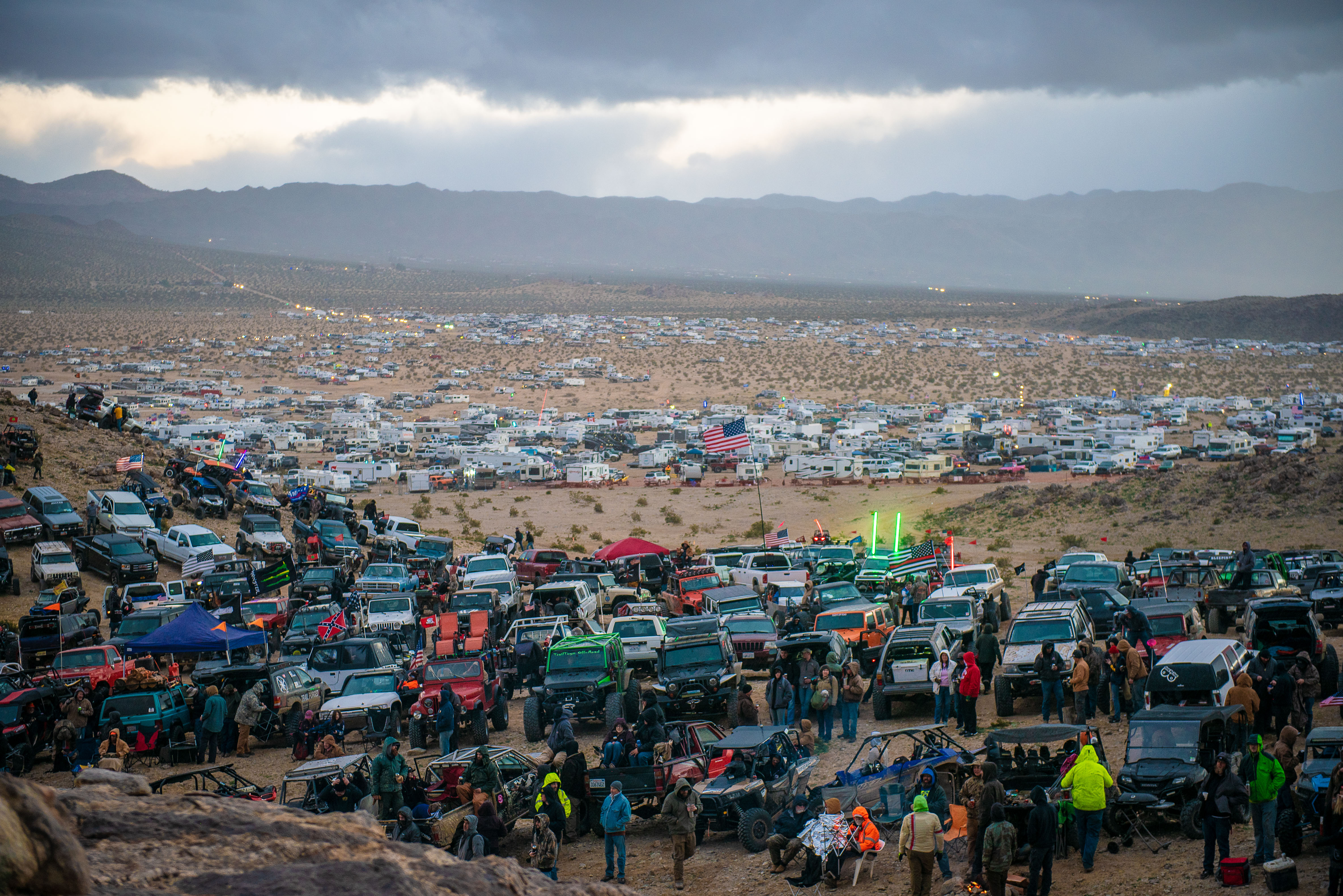
Johnson Valley during the race

King of the Hammers take place in Johnson Valley, a Bureau of Land Management (BLM) area near Yucca Valley. For the nine-day race week, the Means Dry Lake bed turns into a temporary settlement nicknamed Hammertown. In 2022 there were roughly 400 teams and 80,000 spectators in attendance for the event.

== History ==
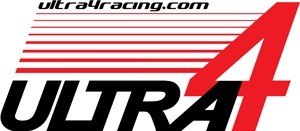
Ultra 4 Racing logo

The King of the Hammers was founded by Jeff Knoll and Dave Cole in 2007, who organized it in a bar via outlining it on a napkin. A trial run was conducted with 12 teams nicknamed the OG13. The OG13 are always invited back to race year after year. All past winners, dubbed "Kings", are also invited annually.

The first official race was in 2008, though no spectators were present. Approximately 50 drivers took part. Race teams started in 30-second intervals from Means Dry Lake bed and navigated through the desert on a 50–60 mile set race course to their first rock course.

In 2013, the United States Marine Corps intended to convert the area into an expanded training facility, as the branch needed the additional land for live-fire training in an area similar to where they would be actually fighting. Opposition from Johnson Valley politicians prevented a total takeover from occurring, and the two parties instead brokered an agreement under the 2014 National Defense Authorization Act (NDAA) that allowed the Marines to receive a large portion of the land, resulting in course adjustments. The compromise between Johnson Valley and the Marines gave roughly 43,000 acres to the former, 79,000 acres to the later, and 53,000 for joint use. The Marines could use their share for two 30-day periods every year, while the rest of the time would be for off-road purposes. However, a petition on the White House website asserted the deal was still unnecessary, arguing that it was fiscally irresponsible and a future burden on taxpayers, especially as the nearby Marine Corps Air Ground Combat Center Twentynine Palms is the largest Marine base in the world. The petition gained 29,456 signatures, though it was not enough to prevent the agreement from going through. There are no reports on the numbers by which the bill, known as H.R. 1676 and the "Johnson Valley National Off-Highway Vehicle Recreation Area Establishment Act", passed or how many revisions the bill had prior to its success.

The community surrounding the Johnson Valley off-road area gains around $71 million a year from off-roaders going to and from the area.

== Sponsors ==
In 2014, Mopar brought their new 5.7 liter engine out to the races, an off-road race version of the (then) recently announced Scat Package performance upgrade Hemi engine. For the race, KOH Nitto Tire returned again as a sponsor for nine competitors after sponsoring six the previous year. Three of the nine entries that Nitto sponsored in 2014 were previous winners: Jason Scherer (2009), Loren Healy (2010), and Erik Miller (2012).

== Vehicles and rules ==
The race vehicles used at the King of the Hammers are known as Ultra 4 vehicles, which are capable of speeds over 100 miles per hour for the desert sections, but still contain gear ratios of 100-to-1 or lower for technical rock crawling. This Ultra4 class is unlimited 4400, and every vehicle is custom fabricated by each team. Traditional design for the front drive-train is a straight axle design, but independent front suspension is becoming a popular design for the high speeds achieved in the wide open plains of the desert. Most racers use highly modified engines that can produce up to 800 horsepower. Forty-inch tires are common, and racers use beadlock wheels.

Competitors start side-by-side, two vehicles every thirty seconds, and must complete the 165-mile course in fewer than 14 hours. Each team must pass through seven checkpoints and at all times while staying within one hundred feet of the centerline of the course. KOH is a no-chase-team race; repairs can only be done on the track by the racers or in the pit area. A last chance qualifier takes place before the race on a two-mile course. 35-50 teams attempt to qualify for the big race.

== 4400 Class "Race of Kings" ==
1st Place Finishers:

- 2007: JR Reynolds and Randy Slawson
- 2008: Shannon Campbell
- 2009: Jason Scherer and Jason Berger
- 2010: Loren Healy and Rodney Woody
- 2011: Shannon Campbell
- 2012: Erik Miller and Robert Ruggiero
- 2013: Randy Slawson and Michael Slawson
- 2014: Loren Healy and Casey Trujillo
- 2015: Randy Slawson and Michael Slawson
- 2016: Erik Miller
- 2017: Shannon Campbell
- 2018: Jason Scherer
- 2019: Jason Scherer
- 2020: Josh Blyler
- 2021: Randy Slawson and Dustin Emick
- 2022: Raul Gomez
- 2023: Raul Gomez
- 2024: JP Gomez
- 2025: Kyle Chaney
- 2026: Randy Slawson and Dustin Emick

2nd Place Finishers:

- 2007:
- 2008:
- 2009: Casey Currie
- 2010: Brad Lovell
- 2011: Tony Pellegrino
- 2012: Rick Mooneyham
- 2013: Shannon Campbell
- 2014: Tony Pellegrino
- 2015: Erik Miller
- 2016: Jason Scherer
- 2017: Wayland Campbell
- 2018: Erik Miller
- 2019: Erik Miller
- 2020: Erik Miller
- 2021: JP Gomez
- 2022: Jason Scherer
- 2023: Jason Scherer
- 2024: Brett Harrell
- 2025: JP Gomez

3rd Place Finishers:

- 2007:
- 2008:
- 2009:
- 2010:
- 2011:
- 2012: Shannon Campbell
- 2013: Chicky Barton
- 2014: Bill Baird
- 2015:
- 2016: Raul Gomez
- 2017: Jason Scherer
- 2018: Wayland Campbell
- 2019: Shannon Campbell
- 2020: Marcos Gomez
- 2021: Raul Gomez
- 2022: Josh Blyler
- 2023: Josh Blyler
- 2024: John Webb

== 4500 Yukon Gear and Axle Modified Class ==
1st Place Finishers:

- 2007:
- 2008:
- 2009:
- 2010:
- 2011:
- 2012:
- 2013:
- 2014:
- 2015:
- 2016:
- 2017:
- 2018:
- 2019:
- 2020:
- 2021:
- 2022:
- 2023: Duane Garretson
- 2024: Duane Garretson

2nd Place Finishers:

- 2007:
- 2008:
- 2009:
- 2010:
- 2011:
- 2012:
- 2013:
- 2014:
- 2015:
- 2016:
- 2017:
- 2018:
- 2019:
- 2020:
- 2021:
- 2022:
- 2023: Troy Digby
- 2024: Shad Kennedy

3rd Place Finishers:

- 2007:
- 2008:
- 2009:
- 2010:
- 2011:
- 2012:
- 2013:
- 2014:
- 2015:
- 2016:
- 2017:
- 2018:
- 2019:
- 2020:
- 2021:
- 2022:
- 2023: Peter Doolan
- 2024: Steve Crawford

== 4600 Curry Enterprise Stock Class ==
1st Place Finishers:

- 2007:
- 2008:
- 2009:
- 2010:
- 2011:
- 2012:
- 2013:
- 2014:
- 2015:
- 2016:
- 2017:
- 2018:
- 2019:
- 2020:
- 2021:
- 2022:
- 2023: Loren Healy
- 2024: Bailey Cole

2nd Place Finishers:

- 2007:
- 2008:
- 2009:
- 2010:
- 2011:
- 2012:
- 2013:
- 2014:
- 2015:
- 2016:
- 2017:
- 2018:
- 2019:
- 2020:
- 2021:
- 2022:
- 2023: Brad Lovell
- 2024: Loren Healy

3rd Place Finishers:

- 2007:
- 2008:
- 2009:
- 2010:
- 2011:
- 2012:
- 2013:
- 2014:
- 2015:
- 2016:
- 2017:
- 2018:
- 2019:
- 2020:
- 2021:
- 2022:
- 2023: Bailey Cole
- 2024: Alex McNeal

== 4800 Branik Motorsports Legends Class ==
1st Place Finishers:

- 2007:
- 2008:
- 2009:
- 2010:
- 2011:
- 2012:
- 2013:
- 2014:
- 2015:
- 2016:
- 2017:
- 2018:
- 2019:
- 2020:
- 2021:
- 2022:
- 2023: Jeremy Jones
- 2024: Randy Slawson

2nd Place Finishers:

- 2007:
- 2008:
- 2009:
- 2010:
- 2011:
- 2012:
- 2013:
- 2014:
- 2015:
- 2016:
- 2017:
- 2018:
- 2019:
- 2020:
- 2021:
- 2022:
- 2023: Scott Foley
- 2024: Stephen Rose Jr

3rd Place Finishers:

- 2007:
- 2008:
- 2009:
- 2010:
- 2011:
- 2012:
- 2013:
- 2014:
- 2015:
- 2016:
- 2017:
- 2018:
- 2019:
- 2020:
- 2021:
- 2022:
- 2023: Dan Fresh
- 2024: Jeremy Jones

== EV Class ==
1st Place Finishers:

- 2007:
- 2008:
- 2009:
- 2010:
- 2011:
- 2012:
- 2013:
- 2014:
- 2015:
- 2016:
- 2017:
- 2018:
- 2019:
- 2020:
- 2021:
- 2022:
- 2023:
- 2024:

2nd Place Finishers:

- 2007:
- 2008:
- 2009:
- 2010:
- 2011:
- 2012:
- 2013:
- 2014:
- 2015:
- 2016:
- 2017:
- 2018:
- 2019:
- 2020:
- 2021:
- 2022:
- 2023:
- 2024:

3rd Place Finishers:

- 2007:
- 2008:
- 2009:
- 2010:
- 2011:
- 2012:
- 2013:
- 2014:
- 2015:
- 2016:
- 2017:
- 2018:
- 2019:
- 2020:
- 2021:
- 2022:
- 2023:
- 2024:

== Can Am Class ==
1st Place Finishers:

- 2007:
- 2008:
- 2009:
- 2010:
- 2011:
- 2012:
- 2013:
- 2014:
- 2015:
- 2016:
- 2017:
- 2018:
- 2019:
- 2020:
- 2021:
- 2022:
- 2023:
- 2024:

2nd Place Finishers:

- 2007:
- 2008:
- 2009:
- 2010:
- 2011:
- 2012:
- 2013:
- 2014:
- 2015:
- 2016:
- 2017:
- 2018:
- 2019:
- 2020:
- 2021:
- 2022:
- 2023:
- 2024:

3rd Place Finishers:

- 2007:
- 2008:
- 2009:
- 2010:
- 2011:
- 2012:
- 2013:
- 2014:
- 2015:
- 2016:
- 2017:
- 2018:
- 2019:
- 2020:
- 2021:
- 2022:
- 2023:
- 2024:

== King of the Motos ==
1st Place Finishers:

- 2007:
- 2008:
- 2009:
- 2010:
- 2011:
- 2012: Graham Jarvis
- 2013:
- 2014:
- 2015:
- 2016:
- 2017:
- 2018:
- 2019:
- 2020: Cody Matthew-Webb
- 2021:
- 2022:
- 2023:

2nd Place Finishers:

- 2007:
- 2008:
- 2009:
- 2010:
- 2011:
- 2012: Kyle Redmond
- 2013:
- 2014:
- 2015:
- 2016:
- 2017:
- 2018:
- 2019:
- 2020: Trystan Hart
- 2021:
- 2022:
- 2023:

3rd Place Finishers:

- 2007:
- 2008:
- 2009:
- 2010:
- 2011:
- 2012: Destry Abbott
- 2013:
- 2014:
- 2015:
- 2016:
- 2017:
- 2018:
- 2019:
- 2020: Manuel Lettenbichler
- 2021:
- 2022:
- 2023:
