= Toyota Tundra =

Full-size pickup truck

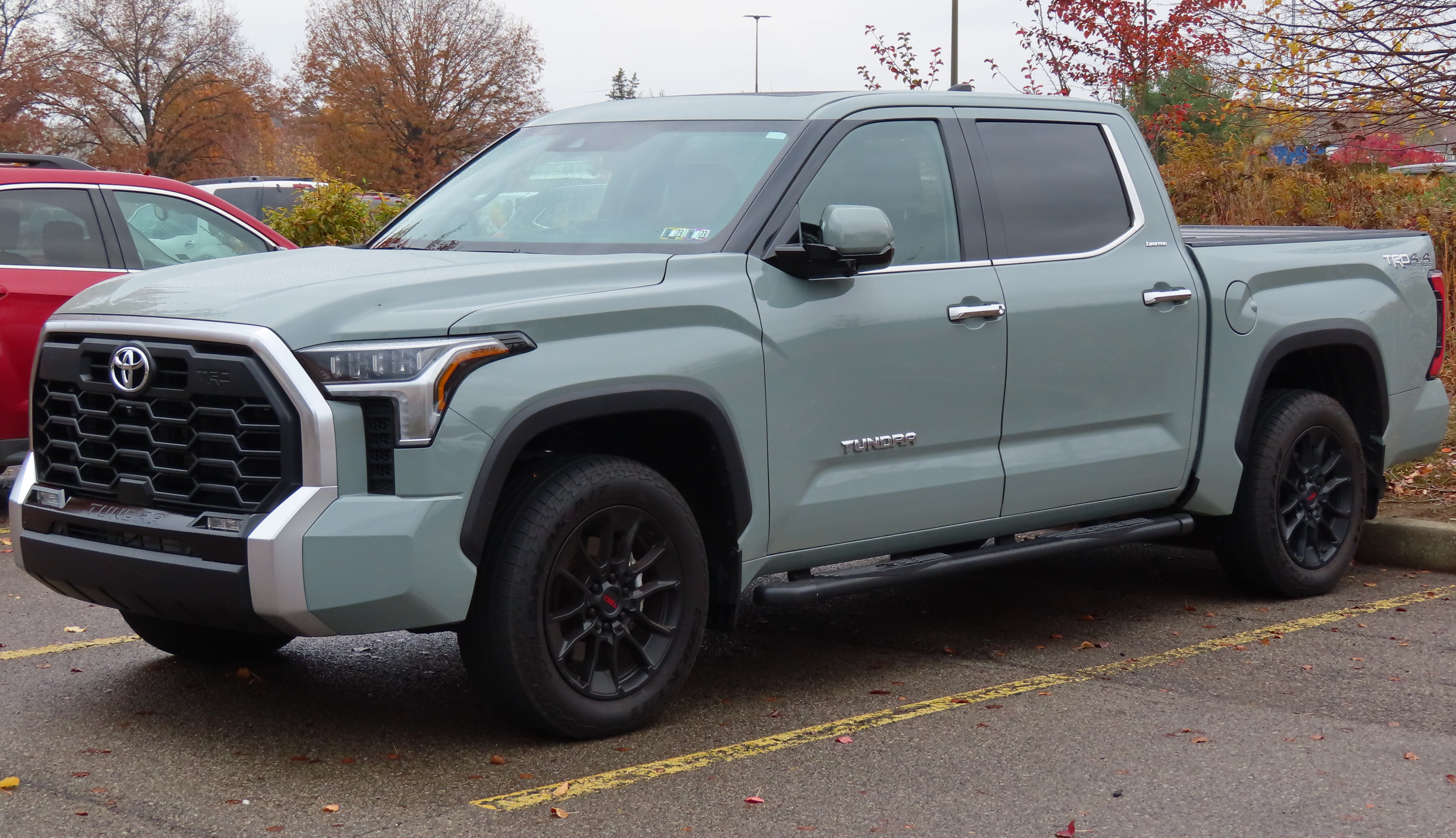
- 2022 Toyota Tundra Limited CrewMax with TRD Off-Road Package (VXKA75, US)

Overview
- Manufacturer: Toyota
- Production: May 1999 – present
- Model years: 2000–present
- Assembly: United States: Princeton, Indiana (TMMI, until 2009); San Antonio, Texas (TMMTX)

Body and chassis
- Class: Full-size pickup truck
- Layout: Front-engine, rear-wheel-drive; Front-engine, four-wheel-drive
- Related: Toyota Sequoia

Chronology
- Predecessor: Toyota T100

The Toyota Tundra (Japanese: トヨタ・タンドラ, Hepburn: Toyota Tandora) is a full-size pickup truck manufactured in the United States by the Japanese manufacturer Toyota since May 1999. The Tundra was the second full-size pickup to be built by a Japanese manufacturer (the first was the Toyota T100), but the Tundra was the first full-size pickup from a Japanese manufacturer to be built in North America. The Tundra was nominated for the North American Truck of the Year award and was Motor Trend magazine's Truck of the Year in 2000 and 2008. Initially built in a new Toyota plant in Princeton, Indiana, production was consolidated in 2008 to Toyota's San Antonio, Texas, factory.

== First generation (XK30/XK40; 1999) ==
First generation
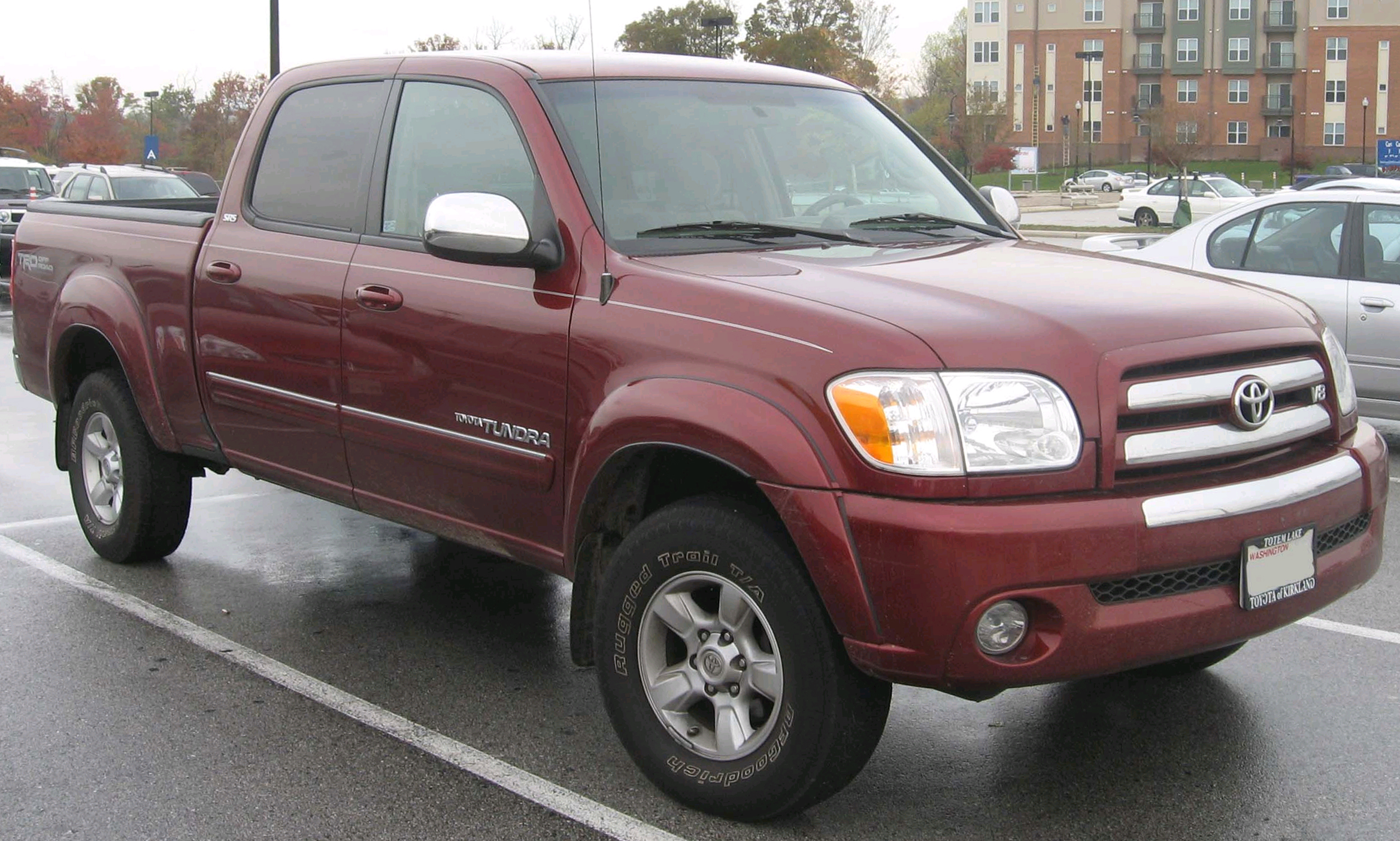

Overview
- Model code: XK30 (rear-wheel drive); XK40 (four-wheel drive)
- Production: May 1999 – December 2006
- Model years: 2000–2006
- Designer: Hideo Kondo, Yusuku Fukushima (1996, 2001)

Body and chassis
- Body style: 2-door regular cab; 4-door extended cab ("Access Cab"); 4-door crew cab ("Double Cab")
- Related: Toyota Sequoia (XK30/XK40)

Powertrain
- Engine: Gasoline: 3.4L 5VZ-FE V6 (VCK30/40; 2000–2004); 4.0L 1GR-FE V6 (GSK30; 2005–2006); 4.7L 2UZ-FE V8 (UCK30/40)
- Transmission: 5-speed manual (2000–2004); 4-speed A340 automatic (2000–2004); 6-speed manual (2005–2006); 5-speed automatic (2005–2006)

Dimensions
- Wheelbase: 128.3 in (3,259 mm); Double Cab: 140.5 in (3,569 mm)
- Length: 2000–04 Access Cab: 217.5 in (5,524 mm); 2005–06 Access Cab: 218.3 in (5,545 mm); Double Cab: 230.1 in (5,845 mm)
- Width: 75.2 in (1,910 mm); Double Cab & Limited: 79.3 in (2,014 mm); Limited Double Cab: 79.7 in (2,024 mm)
- Height: SR5 V8 4WD: 71.1 in (1,806 mm); 2000-04 SR5 Access Cab 4WD: 71.5 in (1,816 mm); SR5 Stepside Access Cab 4WD: 71.3 in (1,811 mm); Limited 4WD: 71.7 in (1,821 mm); 2WD: 70.5 in (1,791 mm); SR5 Access Cab 2WD: 70.7 in (1,796 mm); Limited 2WD: 70.9 in (1,801 mm); Double Cab 4WD: 74.4 in (1,890 mm); Double Cab Limited 4WD: 75.0 in (1,905 mm); Double Cab Limited 2WD: 74.6 in (1,895 mm); Double Cab 2WD: 74.0 in (1,880 mm)
- Curb weight: 3,935–4,215 lb (1,785–1,912 kg)

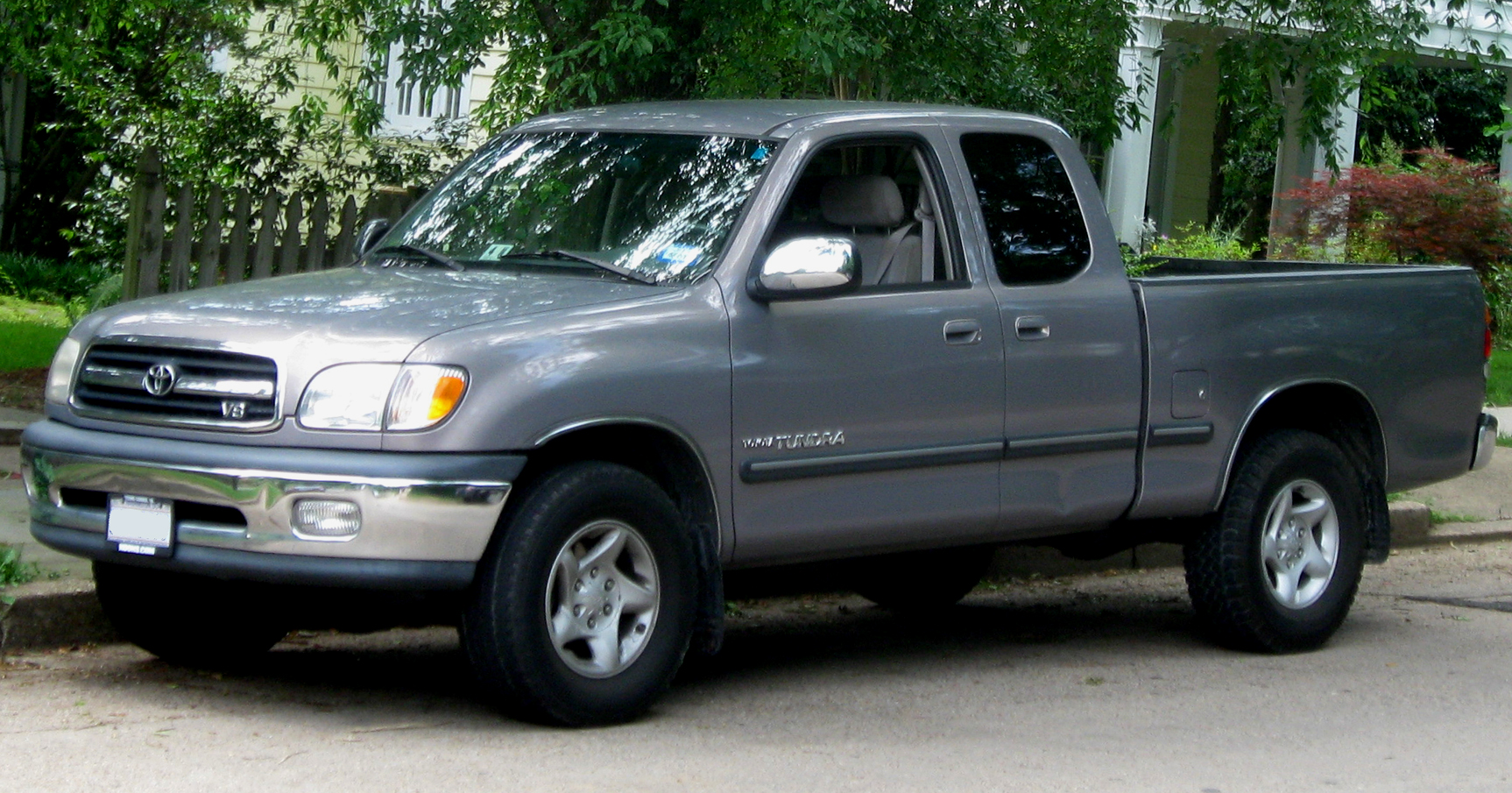
2000-2002 Toyota Tundra Access cab SR5

The first generation Tundra had many similarities with the older Toyota T100 and the compact Toyota Tacoma. These included the shared use of a 3.4L V6 engine which was the top-of-the-line engine in both the Tacoma and T100. The V6 engine would serve as the base engine for the Tundra, while a second engine was added, a 4.7L V8, the first V8 for a Toyota pickup. Model code XK30 denotes rear-wheel drive models, while XK40 is for four-wheel drives.

Publicly introduced in May 1999 as a 2000 model, the Tundra prototypes and "show trucks" were initially known as the T150. However, Ford and automotive journalists criticized the name as being too similar to the market-leader Ford F-150, and following a lawsuit by Ford, the production truck was renamed the Tundra.

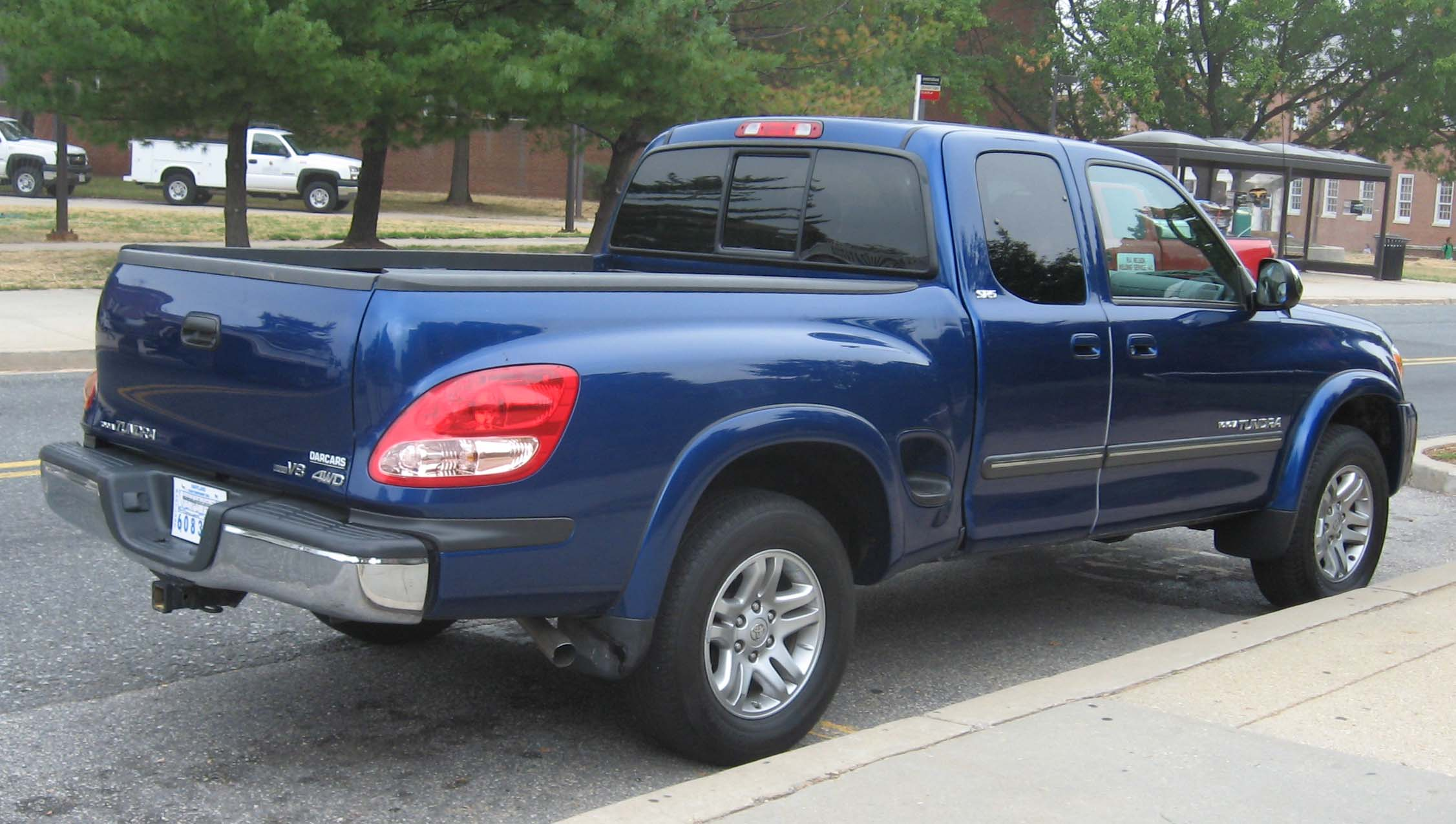
Toyota Tundra stepside

The Tundra was slightly larger than the T100. With a production capacity of 120,000, sales were double the rate of the T100. At its introduction, the Tundra had the highest initial vehicle sales for Toyota in its history. It was selected as Motor Trend's Truck of the Year award for 2000 and Best Full-Size Truck from Consumer Reports. It was assembled in a new Toyota plant in Princeton, Indiana.

Engine choices available in the Tundra were a 24-valve 3.4L V6 engine 5VZ-FE that produced 190 hp (142 kW) and 220 lb⋅ft (300 N⋅m) of torque and an LEV certified 32-valve 4.7L "i-Force" V8 engine 2UZ-FE that produced 245 hp (183 kW) and 315 lb⋅ft (427 N⋅m) of torque. The 3.4L V6 was only available until 2004 and the V8 was upgraded for the 2005–2006 model years alongside a new V6 shared with the Toyota FJ Cruiser.

A Toyota Racing Development (TRD) supercharger was already available for the 3.4L V6 (2000–2003 models) that bumped power to the 260 hp (194 kW) range and 260 lb⋅ft (353 N⋅m) of torque. TRD introduced a second supercharger option for the V8 (2000–2003 models) engine late into its second year of production that increased power to the mid 300 hp (224 kW) range and torque to the 400 lb⋅ft (542 N⋅m) range. The supercharged V8 was dropped when Toyota released the updated VVT-i-equipped 4.7L engine in 2005.

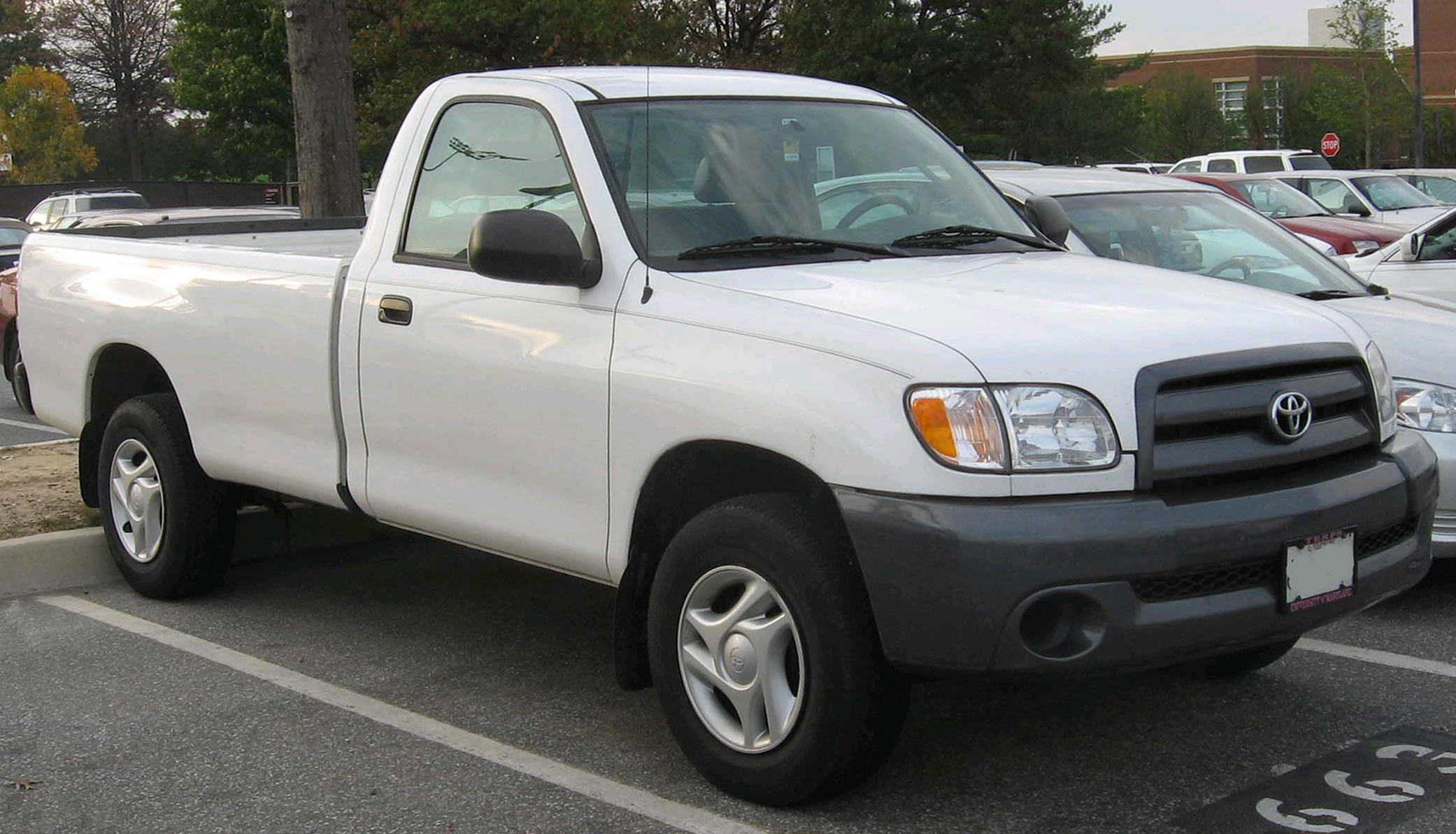
2003-2006 Toyota Tundra regular cab

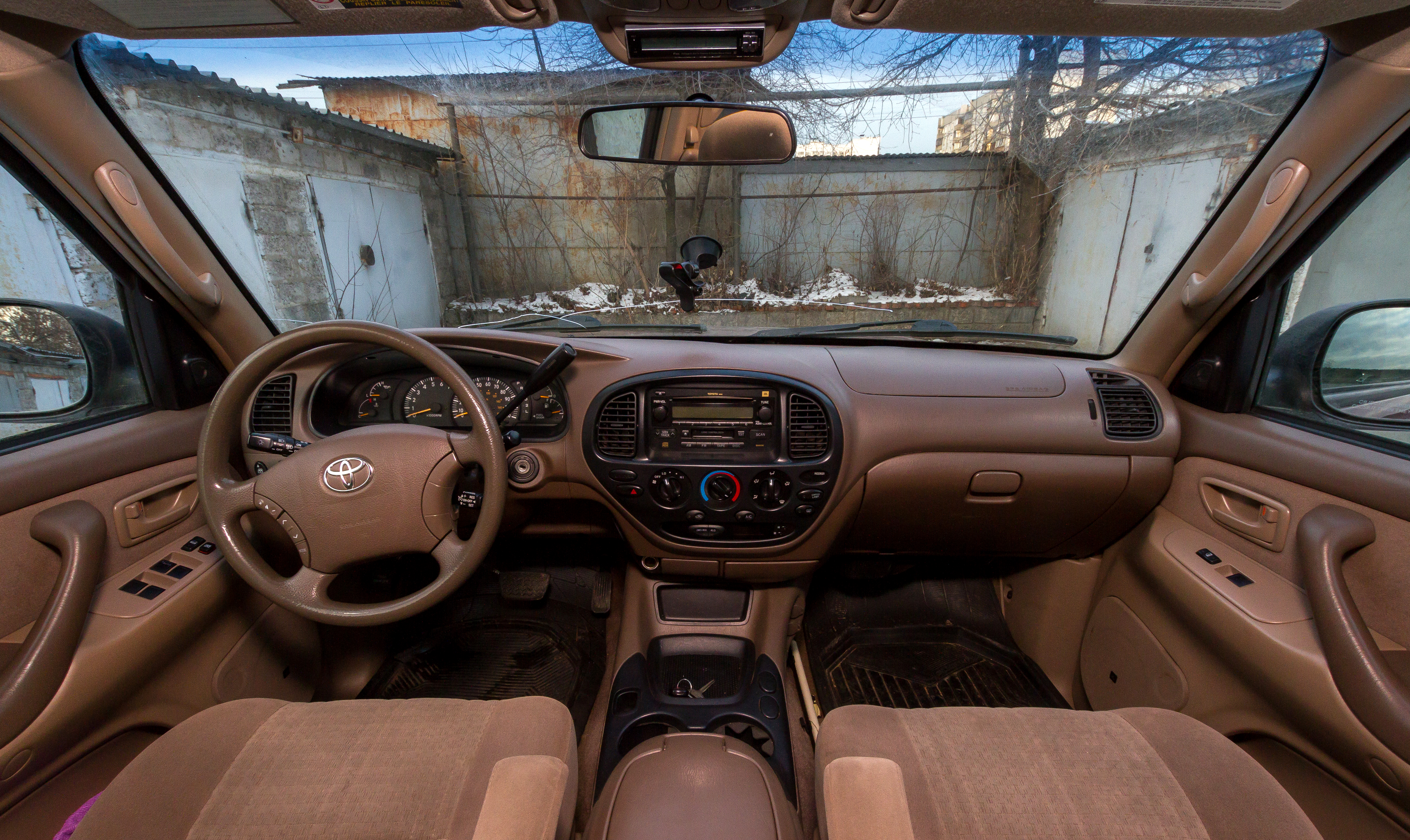
2004 Toyota Tundra interior

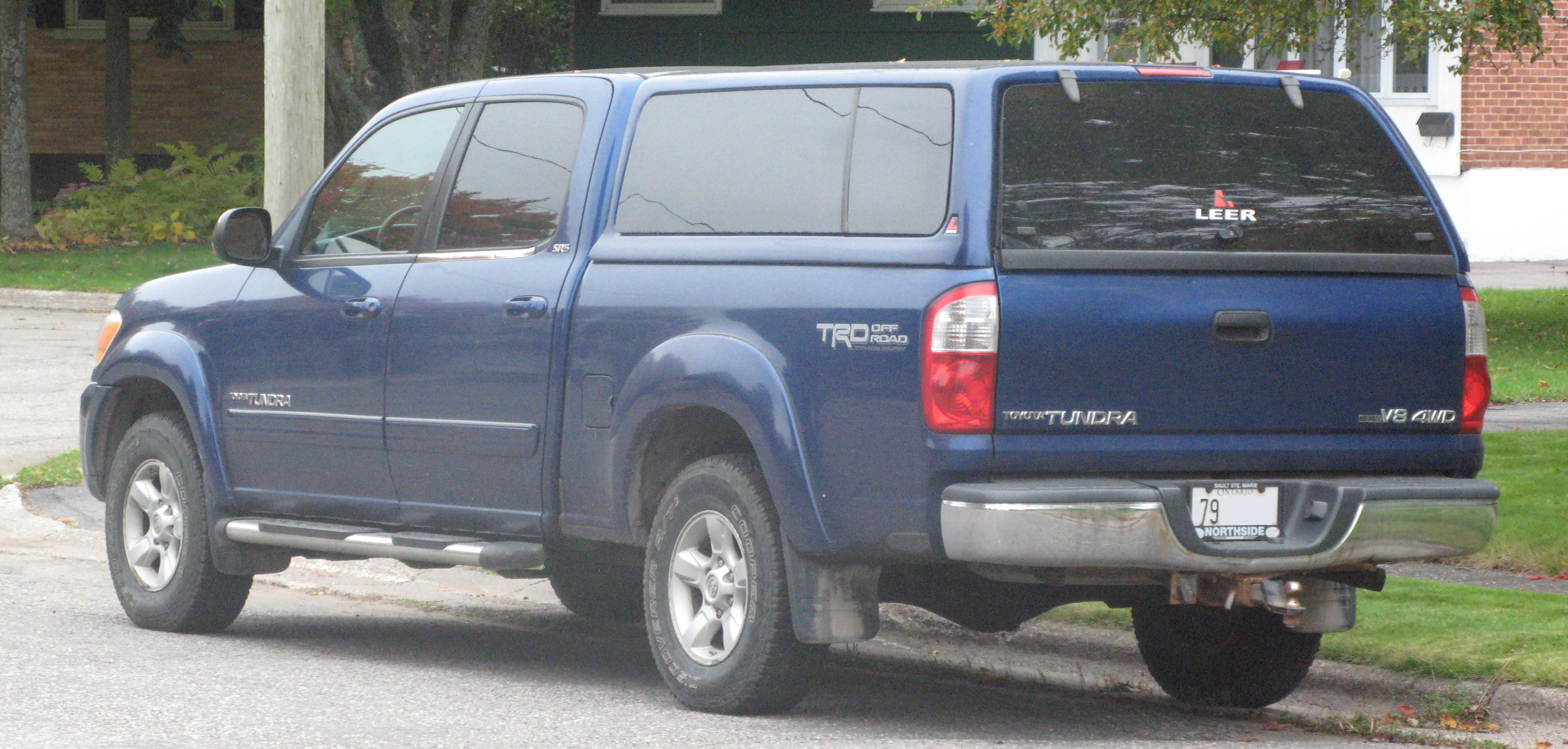
2005 Toyota Tundra Double Cab SR5

The grille was updated in 2002 (for the 2003 model year), along with a new Stepside bed available on Access Cab models. The Tundra Double Cab, also added to the lineup in late 2003 for the 2004 model year, was a crew cab with four rear-opening doors, with many interior and exterior details brought over from the Toyota Sequoia. Its bed was nearly 5 in (127 mm) longer than the competing Nissan Titan or Ford F-150. It is also 13 in (330 mm) longer, 3 in (76 mm) taller, and 4 in (102 mm) wider than the Regular and Access Cab versions, with a 12 in (305 mm) longer wheelbase. The Double Cab was only available with the V8 engine, and carried chassis codes UCK31/41, depending on whether it was equipped with four-wheel drive.

The new V6 engine was introduced in 2005, an aluminum-block 4.0L 1GR-FE rated at 236 hp (176 kW; 239 PS) and 266 lb⋅ft (361 N⋅m) of torque. Also in 2005, the existing 4.7L V8 was updated with Toyota's VVT-i variable valve timing technology and was rated at 282 hp (210 kW; 286 PS) and 325 lb⋅ft (441 N⋅m) of torque while the 2006 versions were rerated at 271 hp (202 kW; 275 PS) and 313 lb⋅ft (424 N⋅m) of torque. The engine however was the exact same for both these years and the rerating was only due to a change in industry standards for how data was determined. Therefore the down-rated changes for 2006 were not actually mechanical in nature.

For the new V6 model, the previous 5-speed manual mated to the 3.4L engine gave way to an optional 6-speed manual for the new 4.0L, and similarly a new 5-speed automatic replaced the older 4-speed. There were never any factory manual options available for the V8. Lastly, for the V8-equipped Tundra, the towing capacity was 6,900 lb (3,130 kg) on the Double Cab and 7,100 lb (3,221 kg) on the Access Cab and Regular Cab models. While suitable for many, the first generation Tundra was reported at the time to not have enough power to compete with heavier-duty offerings of the Big Three (General Motors, Chrysler, and Ford).

In 2003, the T3 Special Edition was sold in conjunction with the release of the film, Terminator 3: Rise of the Machines. It included a TRD performance package, "T3" badging, blacked-out grille and trim pieces, special 17-inch wheels, and T3 limited interior trim. 650 were sold in the US as 4×2 and 200 were sold in Canada as 4×4.

In 2006, the Darrell Waltrip Edition was marketed to honor the NASCAR driver and his participation in the NASCAR Truck Series. Only 2,000 V8-powered Double Cab models were produced. The package included special badging and unique 18-inch wheels.

The Insurance Institute for Highway Safety (IIHS) rated the Tundra "Good" overall in their frontal offset crash test. It was the first full-size pickup awarded a "Good" score; its competitors from Ford and Dodge were rated "Poor," and in the case of GM's entry, "Marginal."

== Second generation (XK50; 2006) ==
Second generation
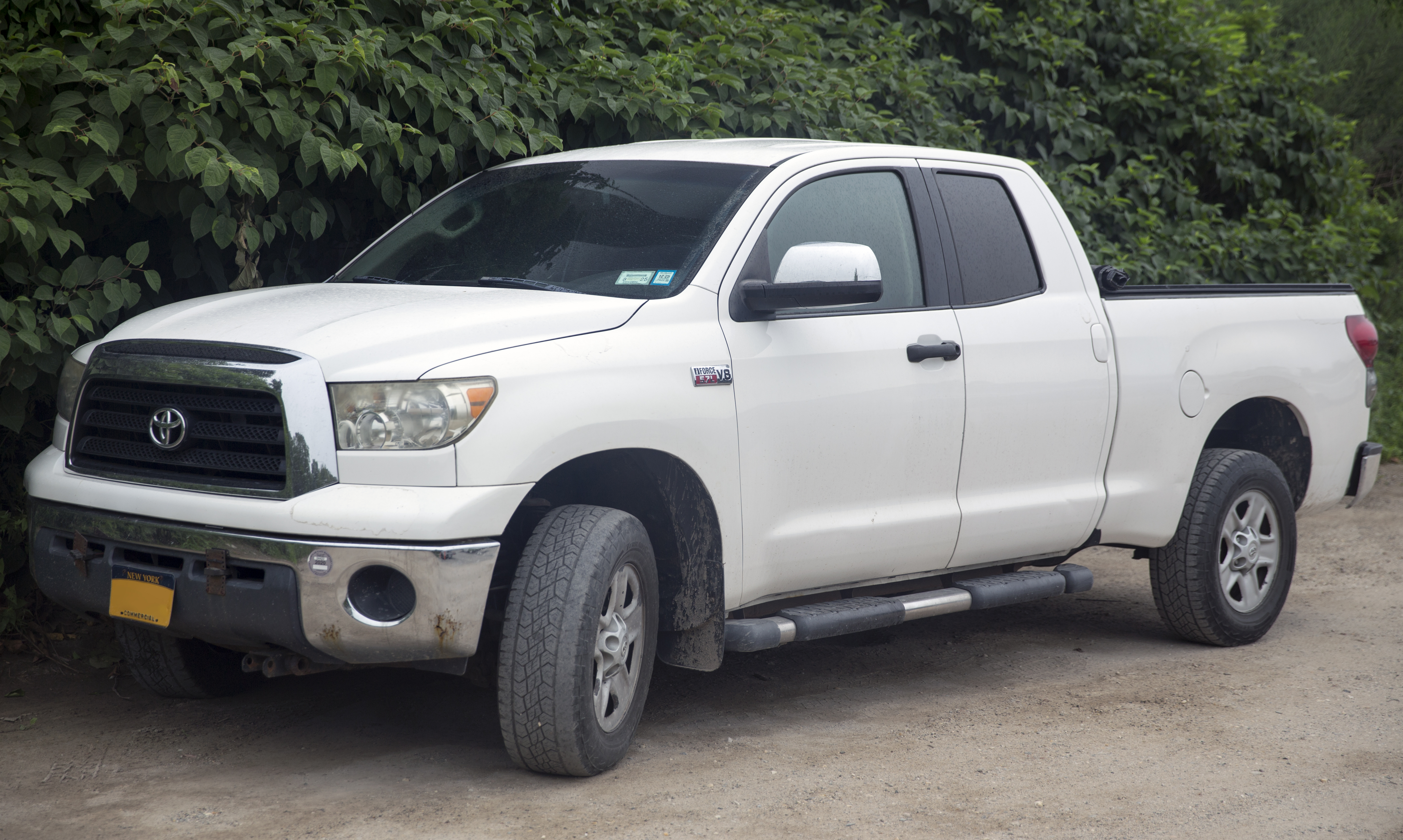

Overview
- Model code: XK50
- Production: November 2006 – October 2021
- Model years: 2007–2021
- Designer: Scott Roller, Miljan Jevremovic, and Kevin Chun; Matt Sperling (facelift: 2011)

Body and chassis
- Body style: 2-door regular cab (2007–2017); 4-door extended cab ("Double Cab"); 4-door crew cab ("CrewMax")
- Platform: Toyota F1
- Related: Toyota Land Cruiser (J200); Lexus LX (J200); Toyota Sequoia (XK60)

Powertrain
- Engine: Gasoline: 4.0L 1GR-FE V6 (VVT-i) 236 hp (2007–2010); 4.0L 1GR-FE V6 (Dual VVT-i) 270 hp (2011–2013); 4.7L 2UZ-FE V8 (VVT-i) 276 hp (2007–2009); 4.6L 1UR-FE V8 (VVT-i) 310 hp (2010–2019); 5.7L 3UR-FE V8 (Dual VVT-i) 381 hp (2007–2021)
- Transmission: 5-speed automatic (A750E/F); 6-speed automatic (AB60E/F); 6-speed automatic (A760E/F)

Dimensions
- Wheelbase: Regular cab 6.5' box: 126.8 (3220 mm); Regular cab 8' box/Double Cab 6.5' box/CrewMax 5.5' box: 145.7 (3700 mm); Double Cab 8' box: 164.6 (4180 mm)
- Length: Regular cab 6.5' box: 209.8 in (5,329 mm); Regular cab 8' box/Double Cab 6.5' box/CrewMax 5.5' box: 228.7 in (5,809 mm); Double Cab 8' box: 247.6 in (6,289 mm)
- Width: 79.9 in (2,029 mm)
- Height: Regular Cab 4WD: 76.2 in (1,935 mm); Regular Cab LB 4WD & Double Cab 4WD: 76.4 in (1,941 mm); CrewMax 4WD: 76.0 in (1,930 mm); Regular & Double Cab 2WD: 75.8 in (1,925 mm); CrewMax 2WD: 75.6 in (1,920 mm)

=== 2007–2013 ===
A larger Tundra was introduced at the February 2006 Chicago Auto Show. It used styling cues from the Toyota Tacoma along with some cues from the Toyota FTX concept truck (also designed by Craig Kember in 2003). The truck featured towing capacity of over 10,000 lb (4,500 kg), and a payload capacity of over 2,000 lb (910 kg), a new 5.7L 3UR-FE V8 engine mated to a new 6-speed automatic transmission. The second generation Tundra had three engine options. The new 5.7L V8 that produces 381 hp (284 kW; 386 PS) and 401 lb⋅ft (544 N⋅m) of torque, and the carry over 4.7L 2UZ-FE V8 rated at 276 hp (206 kW; 280 PS) and 313 lb⋅ft (424 N⋅m) of torque, as well as the previous 4.0L 1GR-FE V6 rated at 236 hp (176 kW; 239 PS) and 266 lb⋅ft (361 N⋅m) of torque.

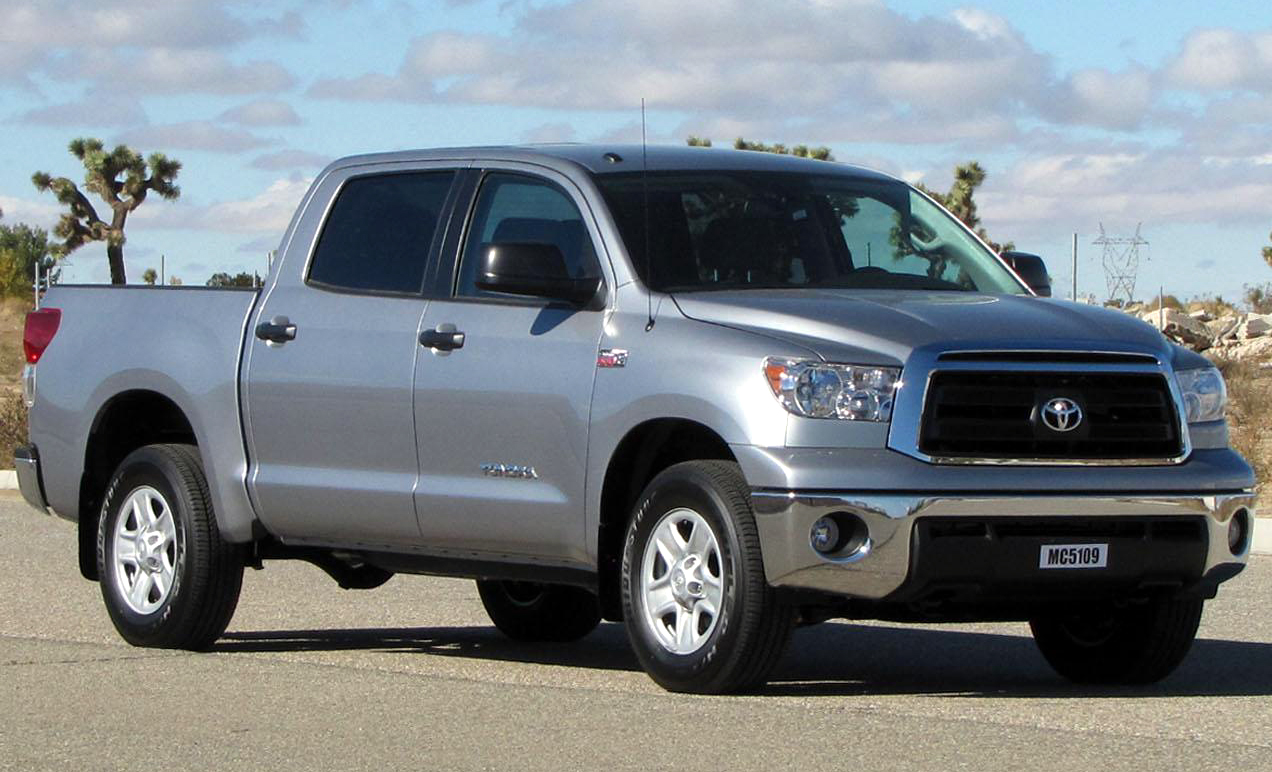
2012 Tundra CrewMax

When the new Tundra was first launched in January 2007, it was available in 31 configurations, which consisted of three bed lengths, three cab configurations, three wheelbases, and two transmissions. The new extended cab now had conventional rear doors instead of the previous generation's rear-hinged doors; it also took the name "Double Cab," which was applied to the first-generation crew cab. The second-generation crew cab was renamed as "CrewMax." The Double Cab and Regular Cab were available with a 6.5-foot (2.0 m) regular bed or an 8-foot (2.4 m) long bed, while the CrewMax was only available with a 5.5-foot (1.7 m) short bed. The Tundra also featured a new 6-speed automatic transmission which could lock the torque converter in fifth and sixth gears with a manual shift mode (which was standard with the 5.7L), giving it a 0–60 mph (0–97 km/h) time of 6.3 seconds and a quarter-mile time of 14.7 seconds.

Toyota designed the new Tundra with construction workers in mind by including extra large door handles, deck rail system, integrated tow hitch, and head restraints that can fit a worker with a hard hat. The Tundra also includes the following as standard: an electronic automatic limited-slip differential (Auto LSD), Vehicle Stability Control, traction control, electronic brakeforce distribution, brake assist, anti-lock brakes, and tailgate assist. However, its starting price was higher than the Chevrolet Silverado Work Truck and Ford F-150 XL.

Some other changes Toyota included in the new Tundra are optional tow mirrors, a 26.4 US gal (100 L; 22 imp gal) fuel tank, available 22-inch (560 mm) alloy wheels, backup camera, Bluetooth, large center console (enough to fit a 15-inch (380 mm) laptop), extra-large disc brakes and calipers, and the aforementioned 6-speed sequential automatic transmission.

All 5.7L Tundras came equipped with a tow package which included engine oil and transmission coolers, an integrated trailer hitch, 4.30:1 axle ratio, and large braking hardware for increased fade resistance. Equipped with the 5.7L V8, the Tundra had a maximum tow rating of 9,000–10,400 lb (4,100–4,700 kg) depending on body configuration. Toyota began rating the Tundra under the SAE J2807 protocol beginning in 2010.

==== Model year changes ====
- The 2008 model added 13 variations, bringing the total number of variations to 44. The 2008 models featured additional standard features at a lower price, and also included a new "Tundra Grade" trim which is slotted below the SR5 trim and geared toward tradespeople and the price-conscious consumer.
- Toyota made E85 fuel capability standard for 2009 Tundras equipped with the 5.7L V8 in select regions. Toyota also updated the TRD Sport package and added a TRD Rock Warrior package. Prices increased 0.4% over the previous 2008 model year.

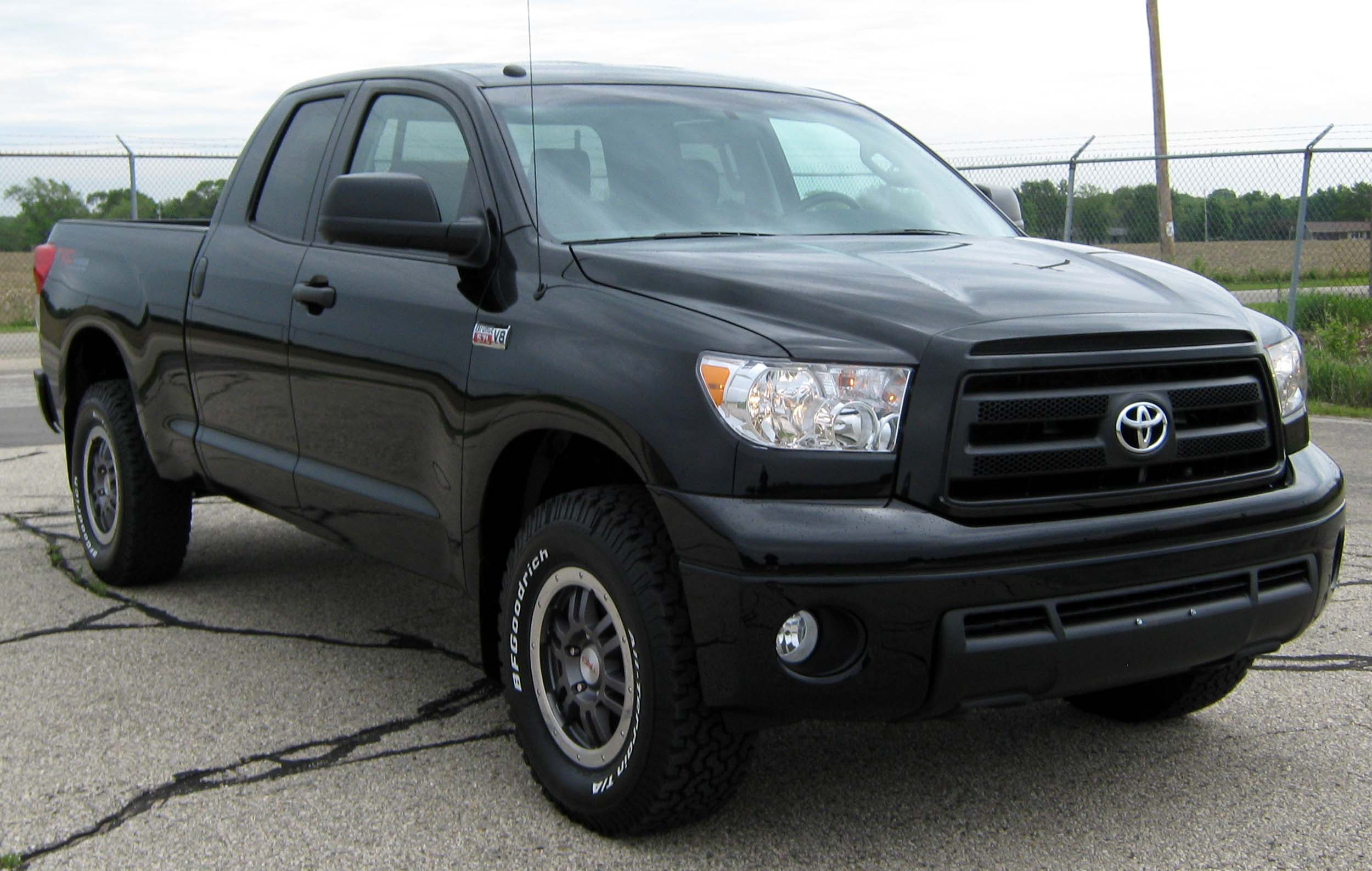
2010 Tundra Double Cab - Rock Warrior model shown

- The 2010 model year Tundra received visual updates to the grille and tail lamps. A premium Platinum trim level was added. A new 4.6 L V8 paired with a 6-speed automatic replaced the previous 4.7 L 2UZ-FE V8 engine. For added safety, driver and front passenger knee airbags became standard and NHTSA frontal crash test scores improved to five stars. The 2010 Tundra began arriving at dealers in late April 2009.

==== Special editions and option packages ====
===== Ivan Ironman Stewart Signature Series Tundra =====
In June 2008, Toyota introduced the Ivan "Ironman" Stewart Signature Series Tundra. Three different packages are offered, one of which includes the TRD Supercharger.

As of 2008, Stewart has won the Baja 500 seventeen times driving Toyota vehicles.

===== Rock Warrior Package =====
For the 2009 model year, Toyota introduced a new off-road themed option package called the TRD Rock Warrior. This option package was only available on the 4x4 Tundras with either the Double Cab or the CrewMax cab. Included are 17-inch TRD forged aluminum wheels, LT285/70R-17 BF Goodrich All-Terrain T/A tires, Bilstein shocks, color-matched front bumper and grille, matte-black rear bumper, and fog lights. The interior included black cloth bucket seats, sport shift knob, and pedal covers. Double cab models received a sliding rear window. The TRD Rock Warrior package was only available in Black or Super White. For the 2011 model year, the Rock Warrior package continued with some minor changes. Manual sliding rear window with privacy glass (Double Cab), and TRD Rock Warrior graphics. (Available only in: Black, Radiant Red, Magnetic Gray Metallic, or Super White.)

===== Platinum Package =====
For the 2010 model year, a new luxury option group called the Platinum package was made available exclusively on CrewMax Tundras. The package included a chrome front bumper, unique 20-inch aluminum wheels, Platinum badges, and a power moon roof. Interior upgrades included a DVD navigation system and backup monitor, JBL sound system with satellite radio and a Bluetooth system, wood grain trim, glass break sensor, and door sill protectors. This option group included heated and ventilated bucket seats with perforated leather trim, power controls, and embroidered headrests.

For 2010–2012, the Platinum was offered as a luxury package. For 2013, the Platinum package was made into a trim level.

==== Engines ====
===== 2007–2009 model years =====
- 4.0 L V6 GR engine 236 hp (176 kW) and 266 lb⋅ft (361 N⋅m) (California Air Resources Board (CARB) LEV II certified)
- 4.7 L V8 UZ engine 276 hp (206 kW) and 313 lb⋅ft (424 N⋅m) (CARB ULEV II certified)
- 5.7 L V8 UR engine 381 hp (284 kW) and 401 lb⋅ft (544 N⋅m) (CARB ULEV II certified)

===== 2010–2013 model years =====
- 4.0 L V6 GR engine 236 hp (176 kW) and 266 lb⋅ft (361 N⋅m) (CARB LEV II certified) (2010)
- 4.0 L V6 GR engine 270 hp (201 kW) and 278 lb⋅ft (377 N⋅m) (CARB LEV II certified) (2011-2013)
- 4.6 L V8 UR engine 310 hp (231 kW) and 327 lb⋅ft (443 N⋅m) (CARB ULEV II certified)
- 5.7 L V8 UR engine 381 hp (284 kW) and 401 lb⋅ft (544 N⋅m) (CARB ULEV II certified)

=== 2014–2021 ===
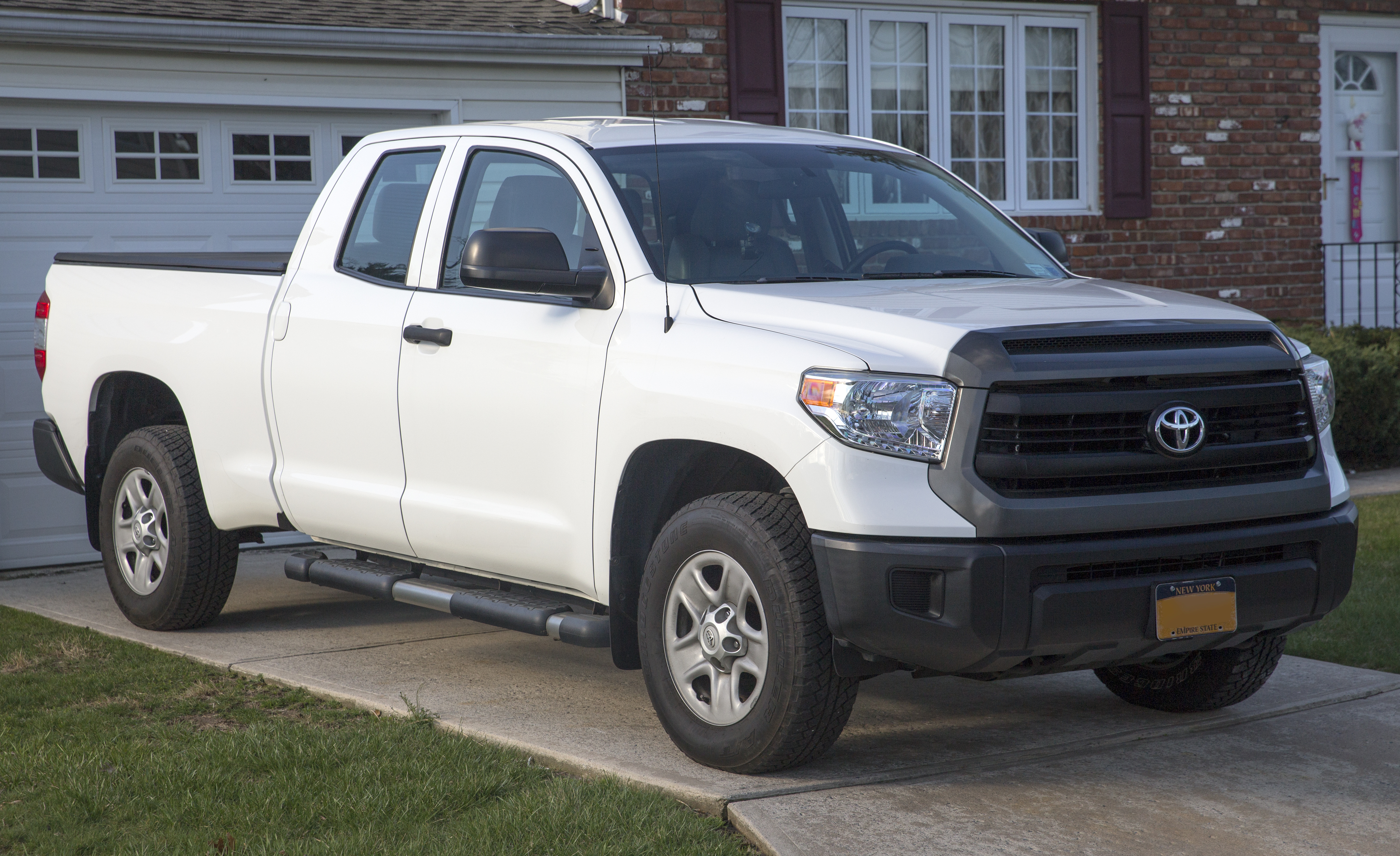
2017 Toyota Tundra SR 4WD Double Cab

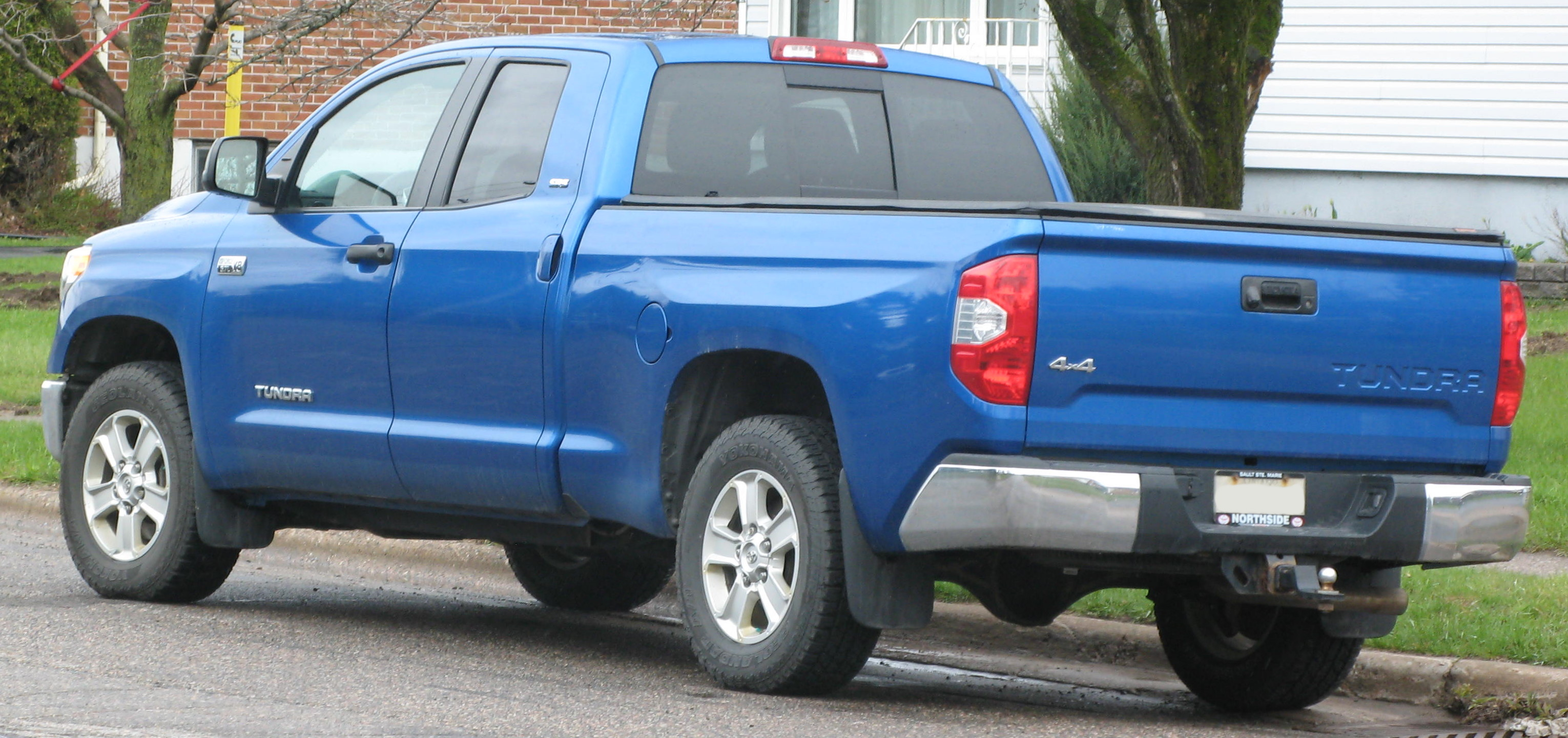
2016 Toyota Tundra SR5 4WD Double Cab

On February 7, 2013, the refreshed 2014 Tundra was introduced at the Chicago Auto Show. The redesign featured a larger grille, more enhanced fenders front and rear, a redesigned tailgate and tail lights, as well as a completely redesigned interior. The only sheet-metal carried over from the previous model was the cab and the doors. The hood line was raised and the tailgate includes a spoiler. The interior featured a standard 3.5-inch information screen, Bluetooth connectivity, and back up camera. The interior included new seats, new gauges, new controls, updated ergonomics, and a redesigned dashboard with improved materials and metal-look surfaces. Toyota kept the same engines used since the MY 2010 update: a 4.0L V6, a 4.6L V8, and a 5.7L V8. However, the 4.0L V6 saw a 34 hp (25 kW) increase in power, and was rated at 270 hp (201 kW) and 278 lb⋅ft (377 N⋅m) of torque.

Toyota retuned the suspension with new damping rates to improve the ride quality over the previous models. The steering rack was re-valved to improve the steering feel. The Tundra lineup included a new premium luxury model called the 1794. The 2014 Tundra was available in five trim levels, the SR, SR5, Limited, Platinum, and 1794. For the 2014 model year, Toyota discontinued the regular cab Tundra with the 6.5 ft (2.0 m) box, but other configurations remained the same.

==== Model year changes ====
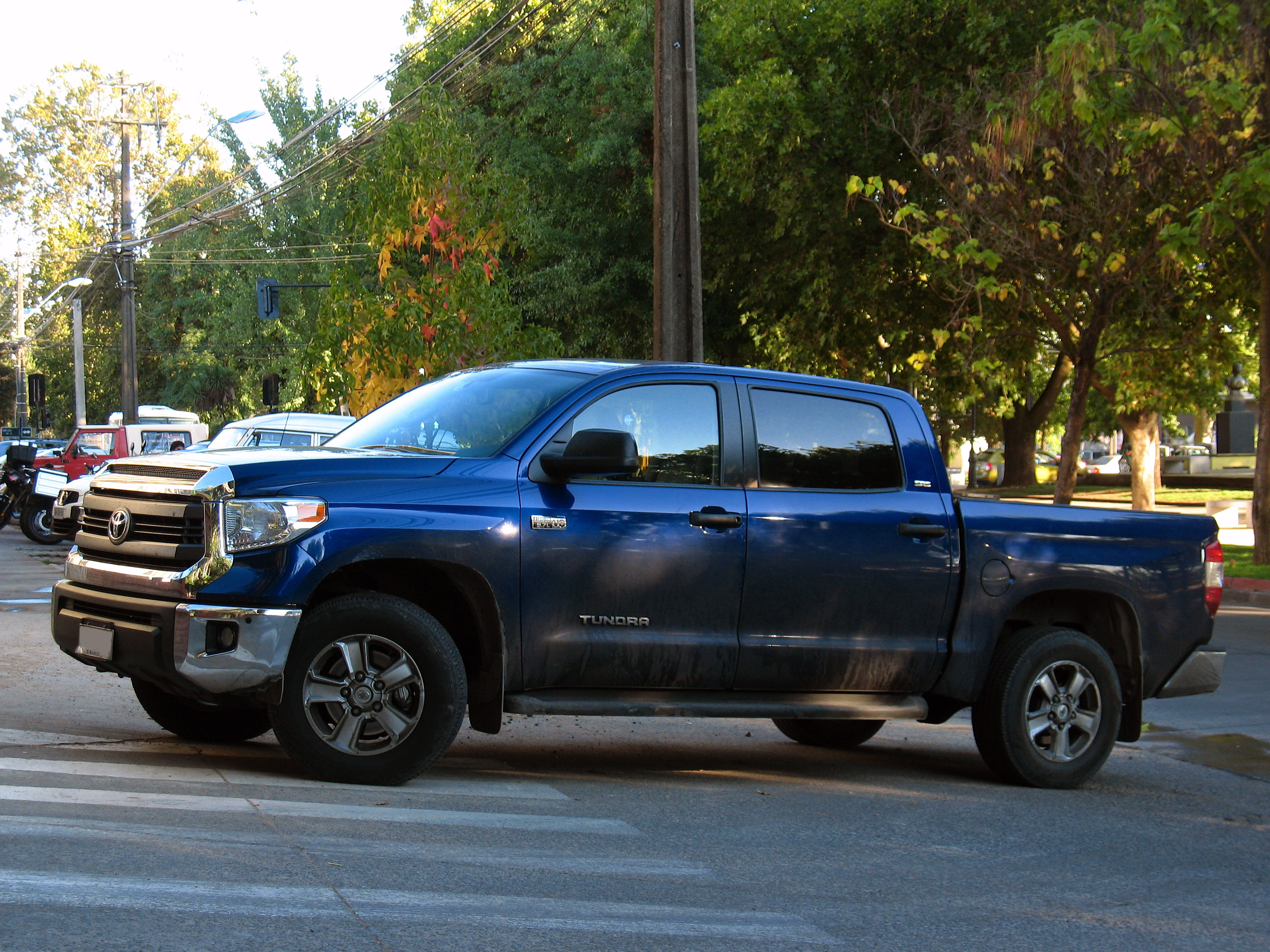
2015 Toyota Tundra SR5 CrewMax in Chile

- The 2015 model year saw the introduction of a sixth trim level, the Tundra TRD Pro, as part of the new TRD Pro family. A rear under seat storage tray was added to SR5 and Limited Double Cab models, and a 3.5" TFT multi-information display was made standard. The 4.0L V6 was also discontinued.
- The 2016 model has an updated front chrome grille on SR5 and 1794 Edition (on 1794 Edition the front bumper center also switched from Silver to Magnetic Gray). A 38-gallon fuel tank option (standard is 26.4 gallons) on 5.7L V8 SR5 models was included with the SR5 Upgrade Package, while it was standard on Limited, Platinum, 1794 Edition, and TRD Pro. 4×2 models were now available with E85 capability. An integrated trailer brake controller was added and was standard on (and exclusive to) all 5.7L V8 models. Blind Spot Monitor and Rear Cross Traffic Alert availability was also expanded as standard equipment on Platinum and 1794 Edition, while also being available on the SR5 (Safety and Convenience Package, which also included front/rear sonar) and Limited (Limited Premium Package). The entertainment system received the updated Entune 2.5 system. The TRD Off-Road Package was also now available on the 1794 Edition. There were also some color changes: Blazing Blue Pearl (8T0) replaced Blue Ribbon Metallic (8T5), Sunset Bronze Metallic (4U3) and Inferno (4X0) were now available on SR5 and Limited (with TRD Off-Road Package (OF)), and the SR was now only available in Super White, Black, and Radiant Red.
- For 2018, the regular cab model with 8 ft (2.4 m) bed was also discontinued, leaving the Double Cab as the entry-level model. The gauge cluster and radio got an update. LED headlights became an option. And Toyota safety sense became standard.
- For 2020, the 4.6L V8 engine was dropped, and the 5.7L V8 became standard across the range.
- For 2021, a pair of new special edition models, the Trail and Nightshade, were introduced that focused on changes to the truck's styling rather than improvements to features.

==== Trim level availability ====
Truck Cab	SR	SR5	Limited	Platinum	1794	TRD Pro
Regular Cab	available	available	not available	not available	not available	not available
Double Cab	available	available	available	not available	not available	available
CrewMax	not available	available	available	available	available	available

==== 1794 Edition ====
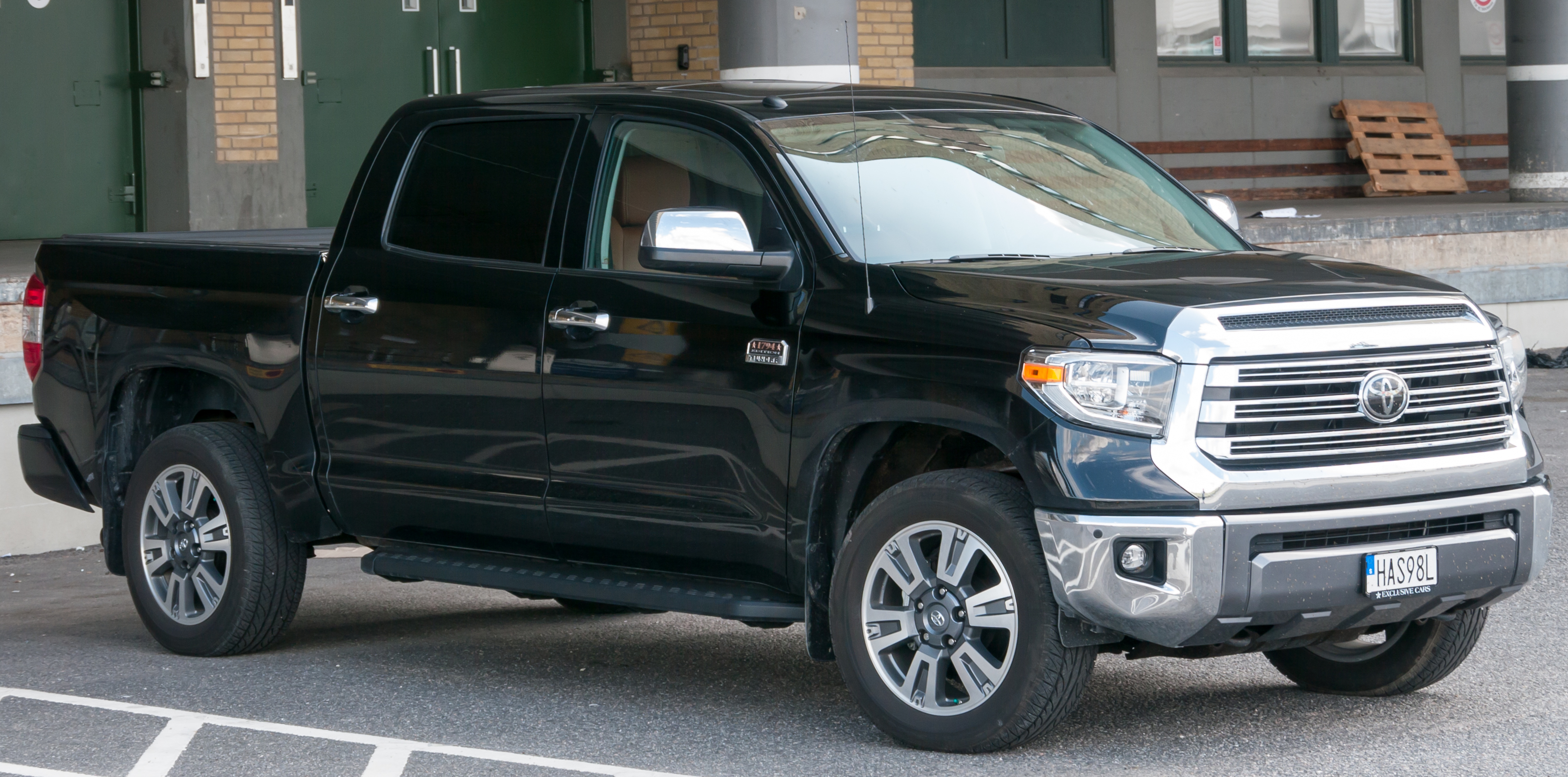
The 1794 Edition Tundra

For the 2014 model year, Toyota introduced the 1794 Edition Tundra, designed as a top-tier luxury model to compete with the Chevrolet Silverado High Country, GMC Sierra Denali, Ford F-150 King Ranch, and Ram Laramie Longhorn. The Toyota Tundra plant sits on land that Toyota purchased from the oldest working cattle ranch in Texas. The 1794 refers to the year that this ranch was established by Spanish colonist Juan Ignacio de Casanova. The 1794 Edition is a Western-themed package which includes Lexus-grade saddle brown leather interior, heated/ventilated/powered front seats, wood-trimmed steering wheel and dash, power sunroof, blind-spot monitoring, an Entune Premium JBL sound system with a navigation system, unique 20" Alloy wheels and 1794 Badging. The seats on the 1794 are finished in leather and a suede-like material and features contrasting stitching. The dash and door panels also have leather-trimmed surfaces along with wood accents.

==== TRD Pro ====
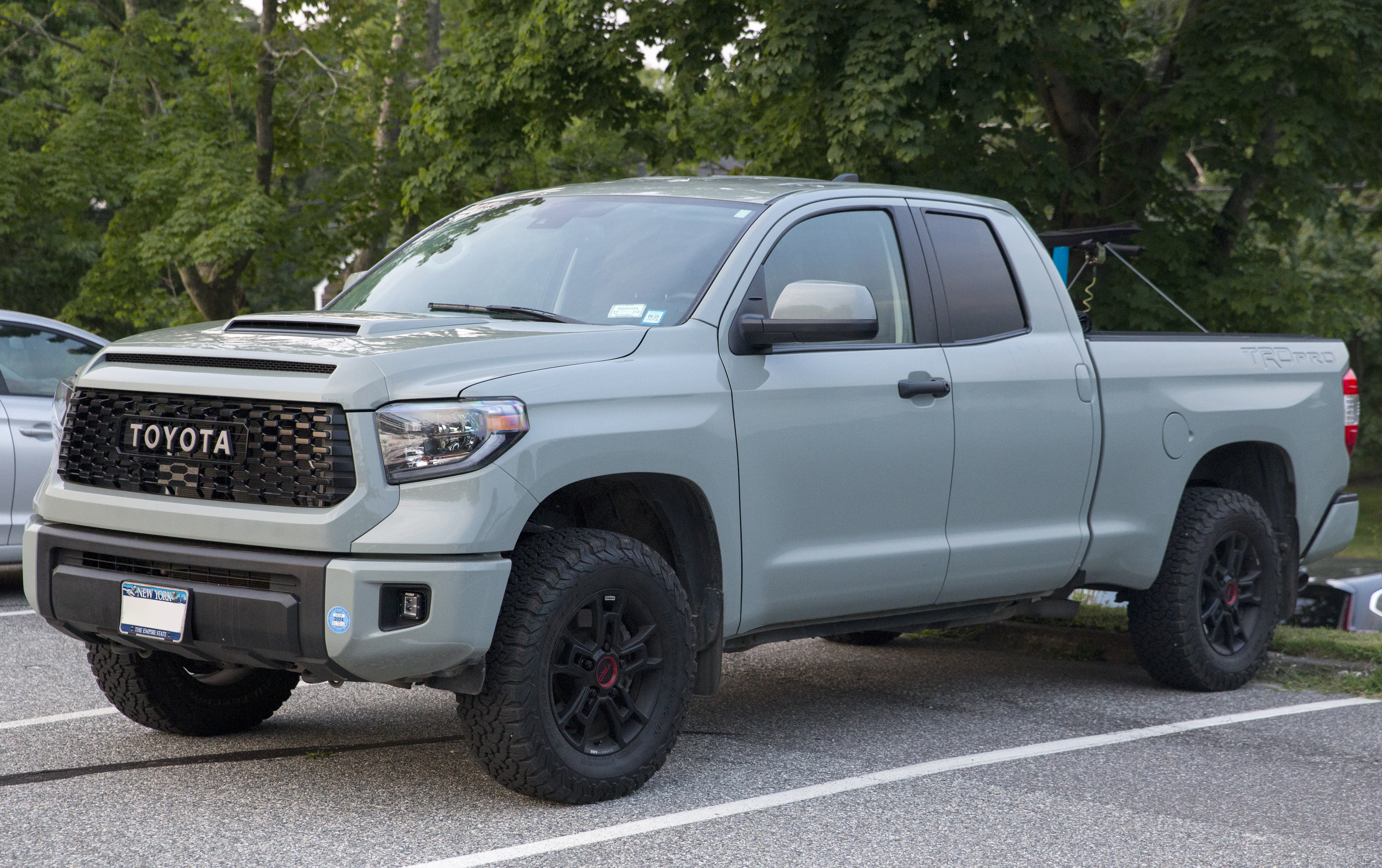
2021 Toyota Tundra TRD Pro

For the 2015 model year, Toyota introduced the TRD Pro option package to compete with the likes of the Ford SVT Raptor and Ram 1500 Rebel. This is marketed as an off-road package that is one step above the standard TRD option package. The TRD Pro includes large 2.5-inch diameter Bilstein remote reservoir shocks at four wheels that allow for a greater extension of the shocks compared to other Tundra shocks. These shocks allow for an additional 1.75 inches (44 mm) of travel in the front and 1.83 inches (46 mm) in the rear and employ a three-stage damping that gets progressively firmer as the suspension compresses. These shocks allow the Tundra TRD Pro to have a front ride height that is 2 inches (51 mm) higher than other Tundras. The front coil springs have a decrease spring rated for more suspension compliance. The TRD Pro also include a 0.25 inches (6 mm) thick aluminum front skid plate and a TRD cat-back dual exhaust system.

The TRD Pro has a unique body-colored grille with a blacked-out center section and the word "TOYOTA" on it instead of the Toyota Emblem. TRD PRO logo is stamped into the sides of the pickup bed, while TRD logos are on the shift knob, center console, and floor mats. The interior features unique TRD Pro upholstery and door trim with contrasting red stitching and an Etune premium audio system with navigation. The tires are P275/65-18 Michelin LTX A/T2 tires on black finished alloy wheels that have unique TRD center caps. The TRD Pro is available in three colours: Inferno, Attitude Black Metallic and Super White. The TRD Pro is available as an option only on the Tundra SR5 4×4 in either the Double Cab with the 6.5 ft (2.0 m) bed or the CrewMax with the 5.5 ft (1.7 m) bed.

For the 2016 model year, the Tundra TRD Pro added Black leather with red contrast stitching and TRD Pro logo. The 38.0-gallon large fuel tank and integrated Trailer Brake Controller was made standard equipment. The color palette was changed to Quicksand (4V6), Magnetic Gray (1G3), and Super White (040). While Super White carried over from 2015, Magnetic Gray (1G3) and Quicksand (4V6) were new. Quicksand was first featured on the FJ-S Cruiser Concept that Toyota and TRD USA used as a testbed for the early TRD Pro Series concept. Quicksand pays tribute to Toyota's iconic FJ40 Land Cruiser.

==== Engines ====
===== 2014–2015 model years =====
- 4.0L V6 GR engine 276 hp (206 kW) and 283 lb⋅ft (384 N⋅m) (CARB LEV II certified) 2014 only
- 4.6L V8 UR engine 310 hp (231 kW) and 327 lb⋅ft (443 N⋅m) (CARB ULEV II certified)
- 5.7L V8 UR engine 381 hp (284 kW) and 401 lb⋅ft (544 N⋅m) (CARB ULEV II certified)

===== Availability =====
	Regular Cab (2014)	Regular Cab (2015)	Double Cab SR (2014)	Double Cab	CrewMax SR5	CrewMax
4.0L V6	standard	not available	standard	not available	not available	not available
4.6L V8	not available	not available	optional	standard	standard	not available
5.7L V8	optional	standard	optional	optional	optional	standard

=== Assembly ===
The second-generation Tundra was initially assembled at two different United States locations—the original Princeton, Indiana, plant supplemented by a newly built San Antonio, Texas, plant. Combined, the two plants gave Toyota a maximum capacity to produce 300,000 Tundra units annually or 100,000 units from the Indiana plant and another 200,000 units from the Texas plant. When designing the Texas plant, Toyota arranged for 21 key Tundra suppliers to set up factories on the same site to avoid logistical issues. However, those suppliers were more vulnerable to a market downturn. Toyota also included a $9 million health care facility to serve workers and their dependents.

The Tundra had 75% North American parts content.

In the second quarter of 2008, Toyota moved all Tundra production to the Texas plant. All Tundra engines and transmissions were built in the United States. As sales fell in 2008, production of the Tundra at San Antonio stopped for three months.

=== Safety ===
The Tundra came equipped with dual front airbags, front row side torso airbags, and rollover sensing side curtain airbags for both the front and rear rows. Vehicle Stability Control, traction control, anti-lock brakes, brake assist, and electronic brakeforce distribution are also standard. For the 2010 model year, a driver and front passenger knee airbag becomes standard.

Toyota's Tundra was the first full-size pickup to have earned the IIHS's Top Safety Pick accolade, followed by the redesigned 2009 Ford F-150. In tests conducted by the IIHS, the Tundra received an overall "Good" score in the frontal offset crash test, the highest possible rating in the side impact crash test, and the maximum score for rear crash protection.

NHTSA crash test ratings (2007):
Frontal Driver	4/5 stars
Frontal Passenger	4/5 stars
Side Driver	4/5 stars
Side Rear Passenger	4/5 stars
Rollover	4/5 stars

The primary difference between IIHS and NHTSA frontal crash testing is the IIHS conducts an offset test where a smaller portion of the vehicle's structure absorbs the energy of the crash. This type of crash test is more demanding on the vehicle's structure, while the full-frontal crash test is more demanding on the vehicle's restraint systems. Both IIHS and NHTSA frontal-impact tests can only be compared among vehicles of similar weights.

Because the Tundra's Vehicle Stability Control system is disabled when the vehicle's 4×4 system is engaged Consumer Reports has questioned the Tundra's Top Safety Pick award. Toyota's response is the Tundra does not feature a center differential which would become a weak point in the drivetrain. However the stability control system remains operational at times when the truck is in 4×2 mode though many drivers will select the 4×4 mode in slippery conditions. As of the 2010 model year, this was corrected. Electronic stability control functions in 4×4 High and is disengaged in 4×4 Low. This is verified by the updated owner's manual, visor instructions, and road tests in snow and ice in 4×4 High. When understeer or oversteer occurs in 4×4 High, a beeping noise is emitted, and the dash indicator lights up yellow indicating that VSC is activated, braking individual wheels to match driver input at the steering wheel.

=== TRD supercharger ===
Toyota began selling a bolt-on TRD supercharger kit for the 5.7L V8 Tundra during June 2008. Power output is increased to 504 hp (376 kW) and 550 lb⋅ft (746 N⋅m) of torque. When the installation is carried out by a Toyota dealership the existing warranty remains intact. This kit features Eaton's TVS Roots-type supercharger which utilizes twin four-lobe rotors, a design shared with the newly introduced Toyota TRD Aurion, Chevrolet Corvette ZR1 and Cadillac CTS-V. TRD discontinued the TRD Supercharger in mid 2015, meaning that the 2015 model year is the last year that has an official TRD ECU reflash available.

Edmunds tested a TRD supercharged Tundra which completed the 1/4 mile in 13.3 sec at 103.8 mph (167.0 km/h). Edmunds previously tested a naturally-aspirated 5.7L V8 Tundra which posted a 14.8 sec at 93.7 mph (150.8 km/h) time. Motor Trend's test of the supercharged Tundra resulted in a 1/4 mile of 13.0 sec at 106.3 mph (171.1 km/h). This Tundra needed 4.4 seconds to run from 0-60 mph (97 km/h).

=== Awards and comparison tests ===
==== Awards ====
- CanadianDriver selected the 2008 Tundra as "Truck King" as the best 1/2-ton pickup with an engine displacing greater than 5.0 Ls, and again as best 1/2-ton with an engine displacing less than 5.0 Ls.
- Trailer Boats awards the Tundra with its 2007 Tow Vehicle of the Year award after completing nearly two weeks of testing.
- Truckin' Magazine awards the Tundra Crew Max with its 2008 Truck of the Year award.
- Motor Trend selected the Tundra its 2008 Truck of the Year. Other competitors tested were the Chevrolet Silverado HD, GMC Sierra HD, and Ford F-250, F-350 and F-450. While the Chevrolet Silverado, Motor Trend's 2007 TOTY was not in the competition, it was defeated by the Tundra in an earlier three round comparison as noted below. However, Motor Trend ranked the Silverado and Sierra ahead in a later comparison test.
- iSeeCars named the Tundra as the pickup truck most original owners keep for 15 Years or more in a 2019 study.

==== Media comparison testing ====
- May 2009: A Motor Trend comparison test with the Ford F150 Supercrew resulted in a defeat.
- April 2009: An Edmunds.com test of 4x4 trucks resulted in a second-place finish for the Tundra.
- November 2008: A test conducted by Pickuptrucks.com rated the Tundra third, Motor Trend was asked to join the test and rated the Tundra fifth.
- 2007: Motor Trend and Truck Trend magazines rate the Tundra ahead of its GM competitor in a three-round battle. Parts of this comparison took place before the Tundra was officially on sale to the public. All sections were published in both magazines.

Introduction Round 1: Head-to-Head Round 2: Down and Dirty Final Round - Up, Over, and Out:

- 2007: Peterson's 4-wheel & Off Road magazine gave the Tundra a second-place finish in their 2008 4x4 of the Year competition. First place went to the Toyota Land Cruiser.
- August 2007: Consumer Reports rates the Tundra as the second best full-size pickup behind the Chevrolet Avalanche.
- April 2007: Car and Driver placed the Tundra third in a five-truck roundup.
- March 2007: Popular Mechanics ranks the Tundra second in a full-size pickup comparison.
- January 2007: Edmunds.com placed the Tundra first in their 1/2-ton comparison test.

== Third generation (XK70; 2021) ==
Third generation
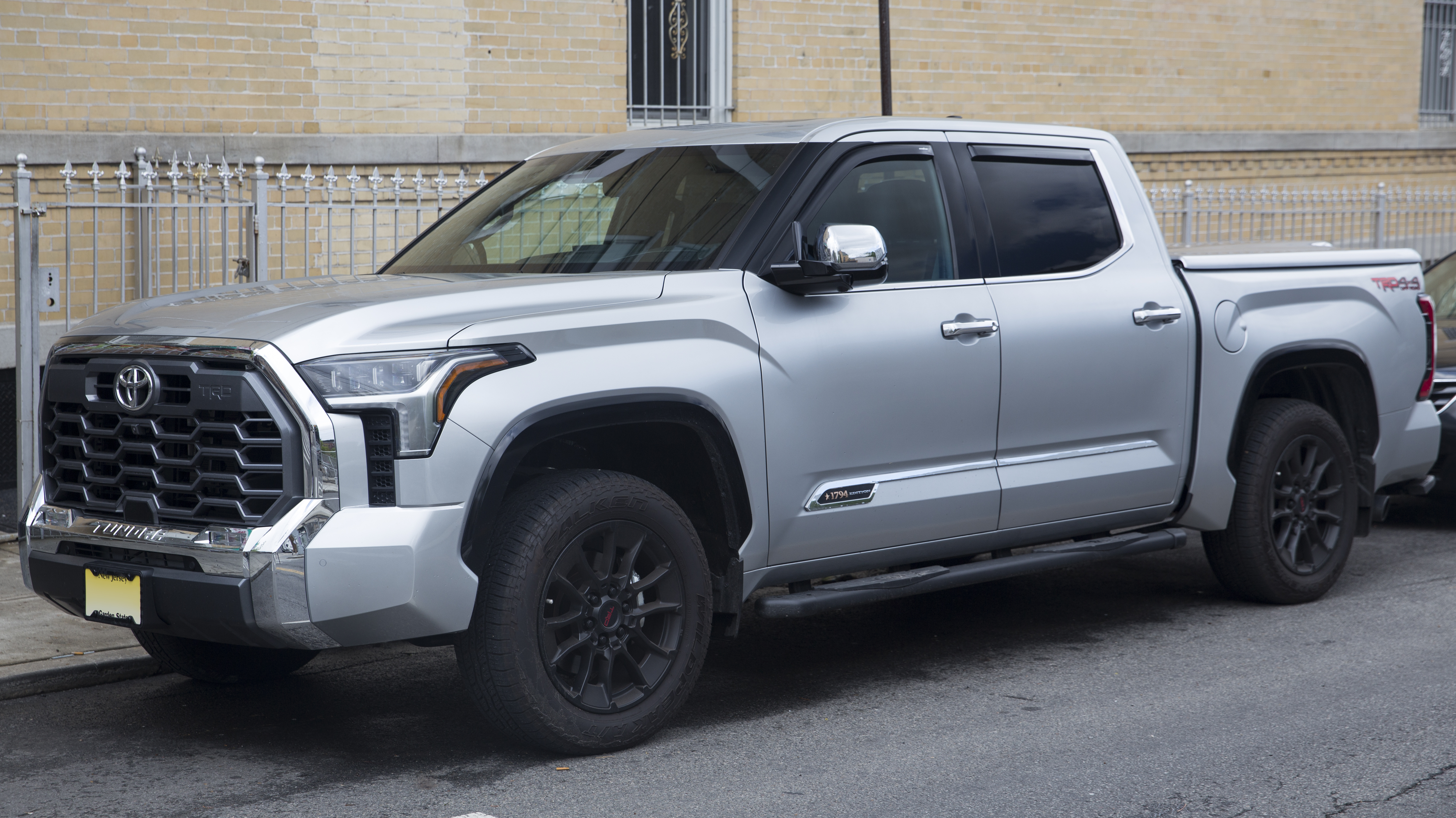
- 2022 Toyota Tundra 1794 Edition TRD CrewMax

Overview
- Model code: XK70
- Production: December 2021 – present
- Model years: 2022–present
- Assembly: United States: San Antonio, Texas (TMMTX); Australia: Clayton South, Victoria (WAG, RHD remanufacturing)
- Designer: Kevin Hunter

Body and chassis
- Body style: 4-door extended cab; 4-door crew cab
- Platform: TNGA: GA-F
- Related: Toyota Sequoia (XK80); Toyota Land Cruiser (J300)/Lexus LX (J310)

Powertrain
- Engine: Gasoline: 3.4 L V35A-FTS twin-turbo V6 (VXKA70/71/72/75/76/77); Gasoline hybrid: 3.4 L V35A-FTS twin-turbo V6 (VXKH70/71/75/76)
- Electric motor: 36 kW (48 hp; 49 PS) L4A0 AC permanent magnet synchronous (hybrid)
- Power output: 348–389 hp (260–290 kW; 353–394 PS) (gasoline); 437 hp (326 kW; 443 PS) (hybrid, combined)
- Transmission: 10-speed AWR10L65 "ECTi Direct Shift" automatic
- Hybrid drivetrain: Parallel (i-Force Max)
- Battery: 1.87 kWh, 6.5 Ah, 288 V NiMH
- Plug-in charging: V2L: 0.4 kW

Dimensions
- Wheelbase: Double cab standard bed and CrewMax short bed: 145.7 in (3,701 mm); Double cab long bed: 164.6 in (4,181 mm); CrewMax standard bed: 157.7 in (4,006 mm)
- Length: Double cab standard bed and CrewMax short bed: 233.6 in (5,933 mm); Double cab long bed: 252.5 in (6,414 mm); CrewMax standard bed: 245.6 in (6,238 mm)
- Width: 80.0 in (2,032 mm)
- Height: 77.0–78.1 in (1,956–1,984 mm)
- Curb weight: Double cab: 5,095–5,565 lb (2,311–2,524 kg); CrewMax: 5,160–6,185 lb (2,341–2,805 kg)

The first official photo of the third-generation Tundra was revealed on June 18, 2021. The pickup truck was officially unveiled during Motor Bella on September 21, 2021. It is built on the body-on-frame GA-F platform. On December 3, 2021, production of the vehicle began in San Antonio, Texas.

The third-generation Tundra is offered with two powertrain options: a 3.4-liter V35A-FTS twin-turbocharged V6 engine producing 348–389 hp (260–290 kW) and 405–479 lb⋅ft (549–650 N⋅m) of torque, or a hybridized version of the V35A-FTS unit with an electric motor housed within the transmission (marketed as "i-Force Max"), producing a total of 437 hp (326 kW) and 583 lb⋅ft (790 N⋅m) of torque. Both powertrain options are mated with a Aisin-sourced 10-speed automatic transmission. For the first time, no V8 engine option was offered. It also had an updated fully-boxed frame and rear coil or air spring suspension. The maximum towing capacity and the maximum payload are increased to 12,000 pounds (5,400 kg) and 1,940 pounds (880 kg) respectively.

The third-generation Tundra is available in seven trim levels, six of which are carried over from the previous generation: SR, SR5, Limited, Platinum, 1794 Edition, and TRD Pro, as well as a newly-added luxury-oriented Capstone trim. SR, SR5, Limited, Platinum, 1794 Edition trims are powered by the regular V35A-FTS engine, while the hybridized unit is available on the Limited and higher trims, and standard on TRD Pro and Capstone trims. Four-wheel drive system is also standard on TRD Pro and Capstone trims.

The Tundra is available in two cab styles, both offering four front-hinged doors: Double Cab (SR, SR5, and Limited only) with either a 6.5-or-8-foot (2.0 or 2.4 m) pickup box, and CrewMax (all trims) with either a 5.5-or-6.5-foot (1.7 or 2.0 m) pickup box (the latter being newly-introduced for the Tundra). A 2-door regular cab model is not offered. A TRD Off-Road Package can be added onto all Tundra trims except SR, TRD Pro, and Capstone. A TRD Sport Package can only be added to the SR5 trim.

====== 3rd Generation Tundra trim specifications ======
Engine (Trans) Trim	iForce (10sp. auto)	iForce MAX (10sp. auto hybrid)
SR	Yes	No
SR5	Yes	No
Limited	Yes	Yes
Platinum	Yes	Yes
1794 Edition	Yes	Yes
TRD Pro	No	Yes
Capstone	No	Yes
Type	3.4 L twin-turbo V6	

=== Updates ===
- In 2022, for the 2023 model year, the SX package became available on the SR5 model with a 6.5 ft (2.0 m) bed on the Double Cab and 5.5 ft (1.7 m) foot bed on the CrewMax.
- In 2023, for the 2024 model year, a new "Terra" color became available only for the TRD Pro trim.
- In 2024, for the 2025 model year, the TRD Rally Package became available on SR5 trim level, and a new "Mudbath" color was available only for the TRD Pro trim.
- In 2025, for the 2026 model year, a new "Wave Maker" color became available only for the TRD Pro trim.
- In 2026, for the 2027 model year, the Tundra received a facelift. The Trailhunter package for SR5 trim was also introduced, all trims upgrade to Toyota Safety Sense 4.0 that debuted on the XA60 series RAV4, and a new "Honeycomb" color became available only for the TRD Pro trim.

=== Australia ===
The Tundra has been sold in Australia since November 2024. It is built in the U.S. in a left-hand drive form and then remanufactured to right-hand drive by the Walkinshaw Automotive Group in Clayton South, Victoria. An initial batch of 300 right-hand drive vehicles meant for a 12-month real-world test was made available for lease in Australia for selected customers in November 2023. The lessees of these vehicles will provide feedback to Toyota Australia as required by the testing program. In Australia, it is available in a sole Limited variant using only the i-Force Max petrol hybrid powertrain. The flagship Premium variant was added in April 2025. Tundra HD (heavy-duty), second-stage remanufacturing, 4495kg gvm, 8500kg gcm, 1900kg front axle, 2700kg rear axle.

=== New Caledonia (France) ===
The Tundra is currently on sale, as of May 2024, in the French Overseas Collectivity of New Caledonia. It is the only place in the entire French Republic where the Tundra can be purchased officially.

=== Japan ===
In December 2025, Toyota announced the Tundra for the Japanese market, as a fully imported vehicle from the US. The Japanese-spec Tundra was unveiled on April 2, 2026 in the sole variant: 1794 Edition.

=== Gallery ===
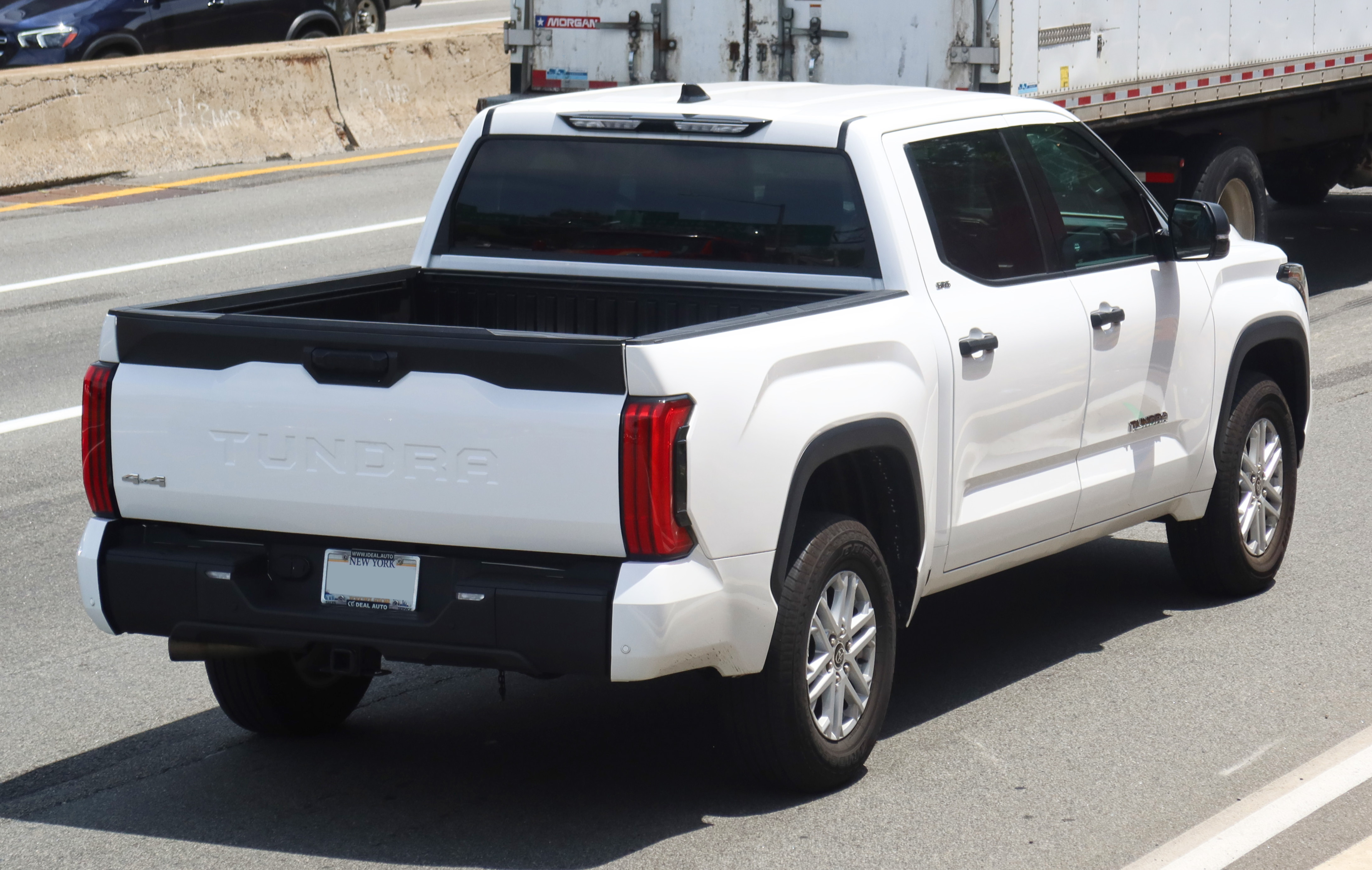
Rear view

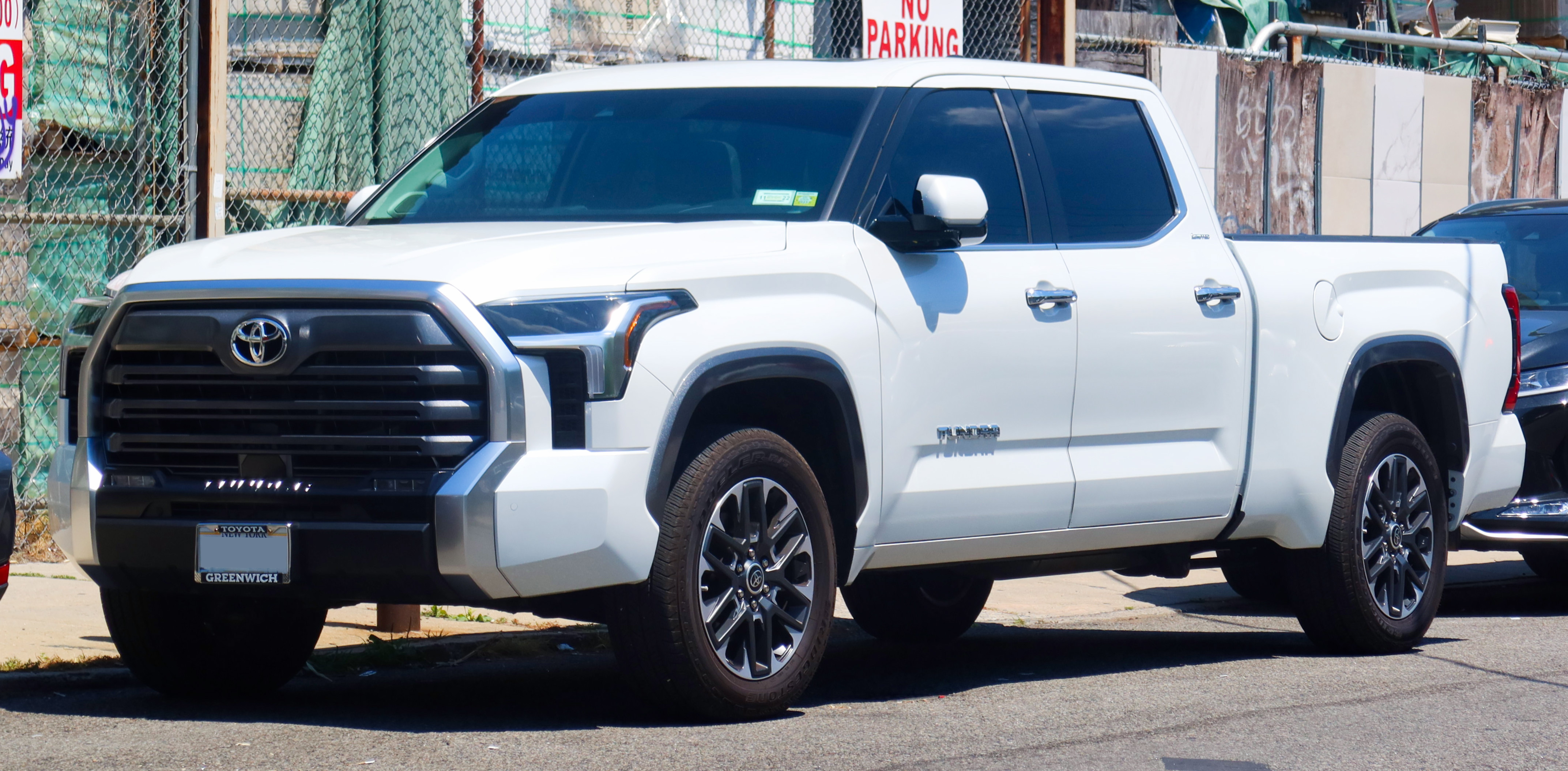
Tundra Limited

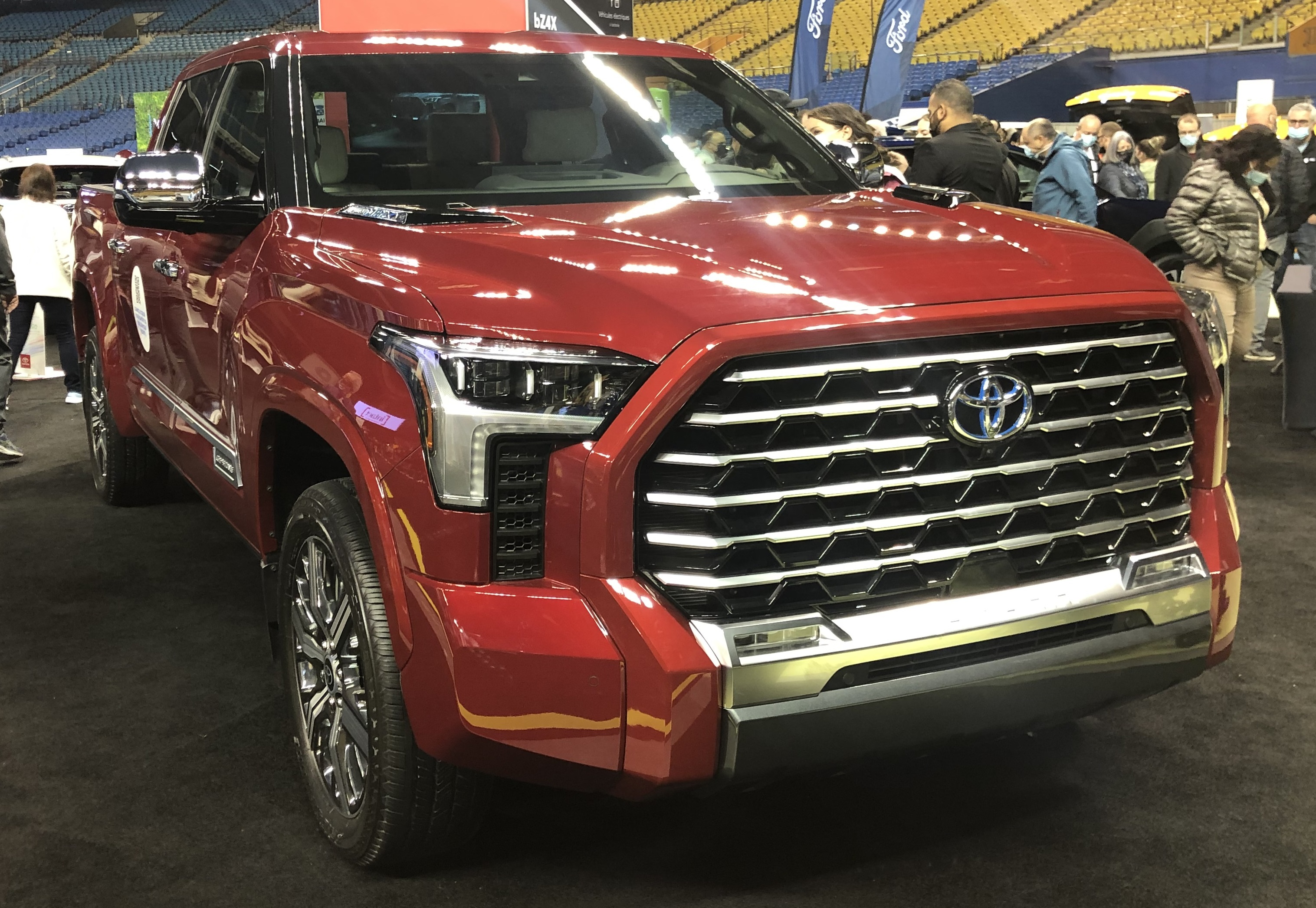
Tundra Capstone

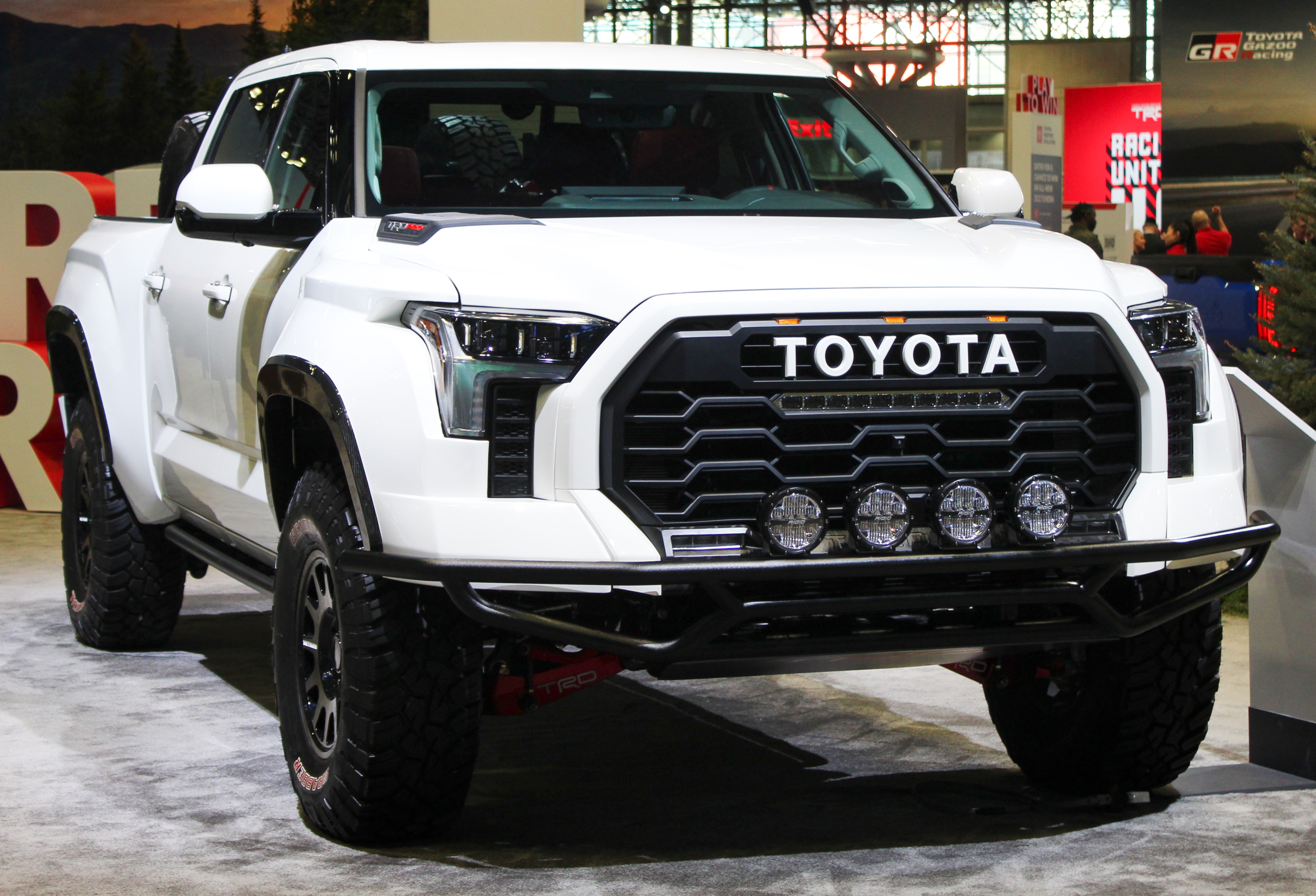
Tundra TRD Pro

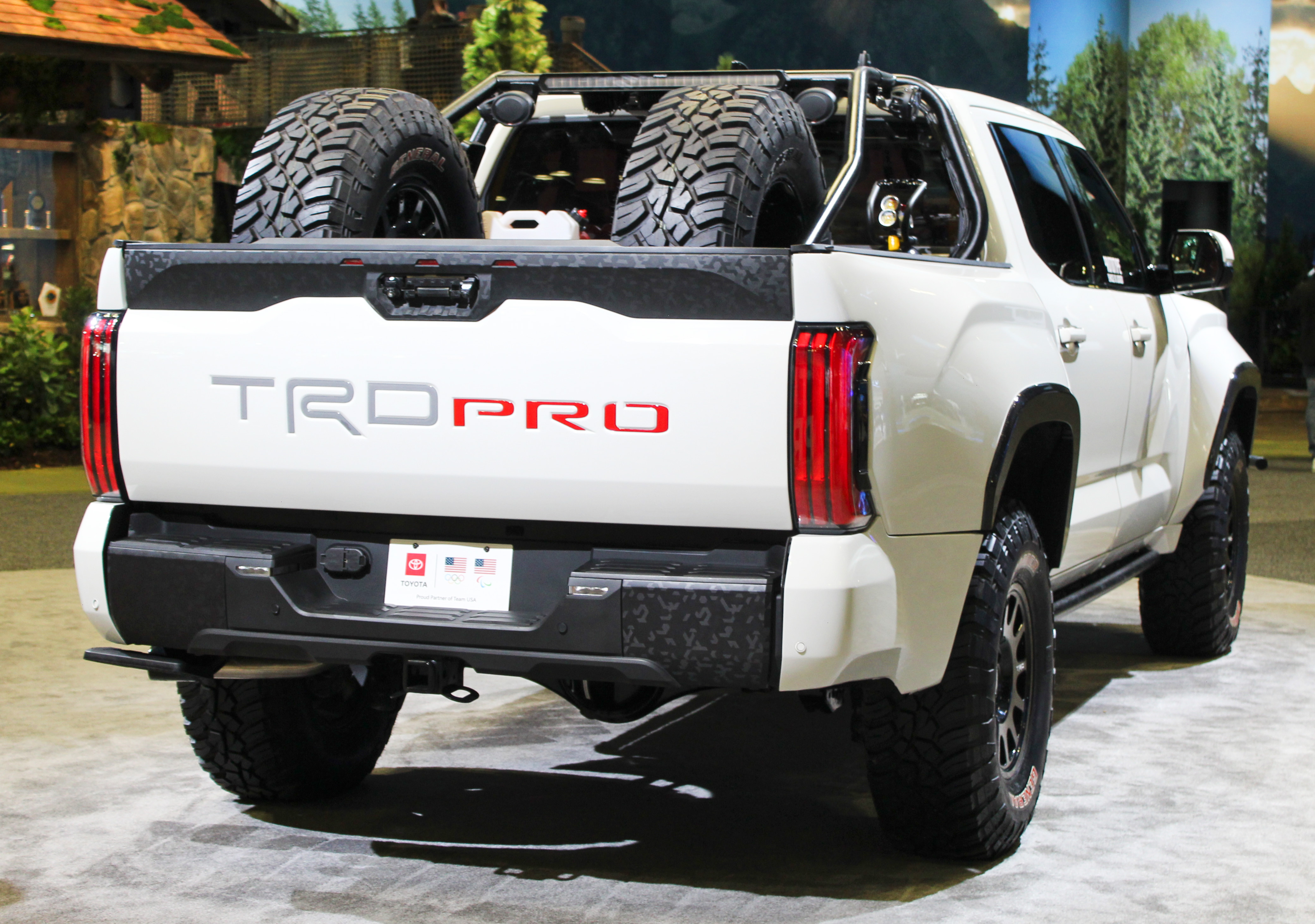
Tundra TRD Pro rear view

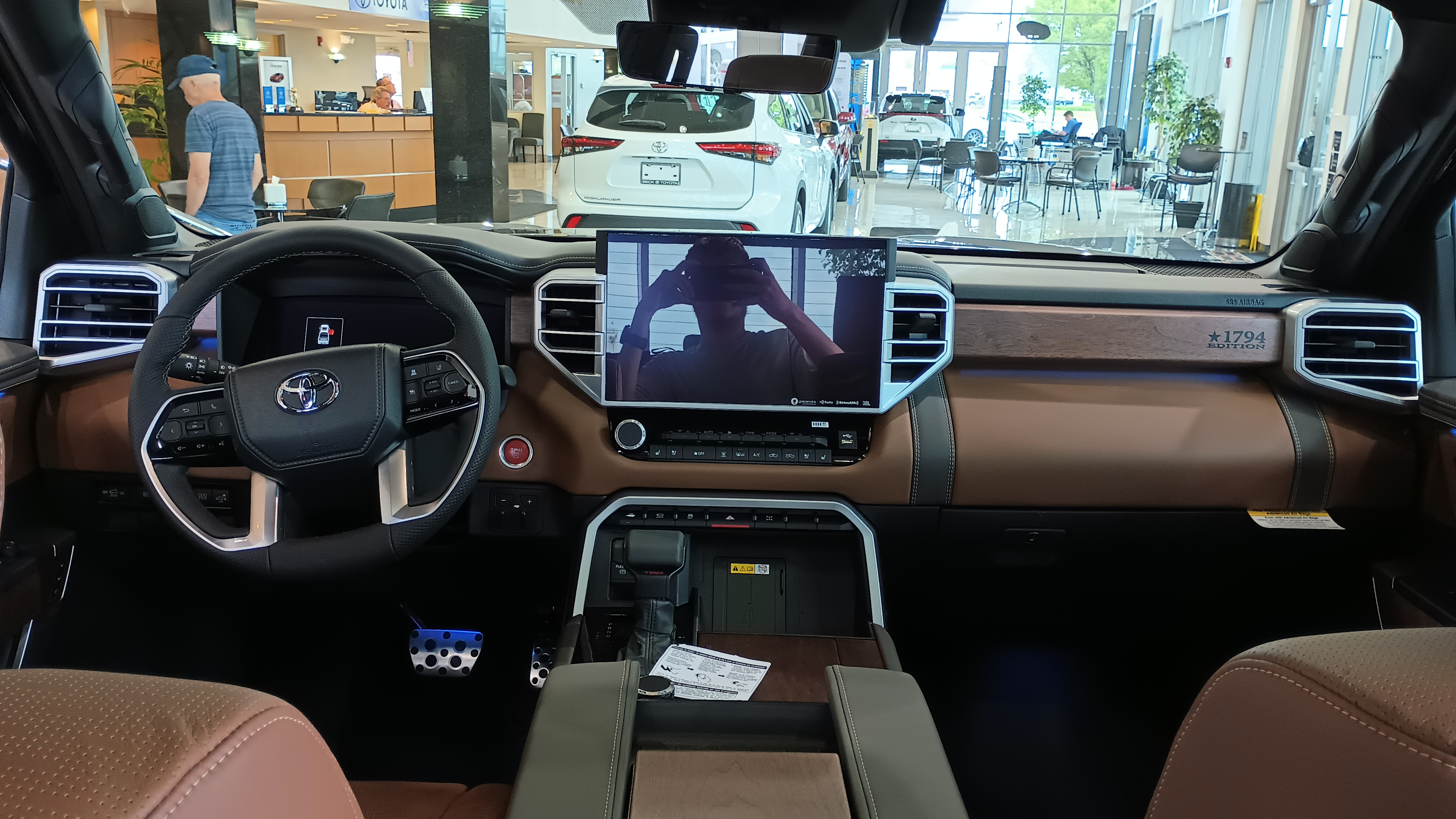
Interior

=== Safety ===
The 2022 Tundra was tested by the IIHS and earned a Top Safety Pick+ award:

IIHS scores
Small overlap front (Driver)	Good	
Small overlap front (Passenger)	Good	
Moderate overlap front	Good	
Side (original test)	Good	
Roof strength	Good	
Head restraints and seats	Good	
Headlights	Good / Acceptable	varies by trim/option
Front crash prevention (Vehicle-to-Vehicle)	Superior	
Front crash prevention (Vehicle-to-Pedestrian, day)	Superior	
Front crash prevention (Vehicle-to-Pedestrian, night)	Advanced	
Child seat anchors (LATCH) ease of use	Good	

ANCAP test results Toyota Tundra Limited & Platinum variants (2025)
Overall
Grading:	50% (Silver)	
Test	Points	%
Pedestrian:	13.47	56%
Safety assist:	6.31	50%

== Recalls and reliability ==
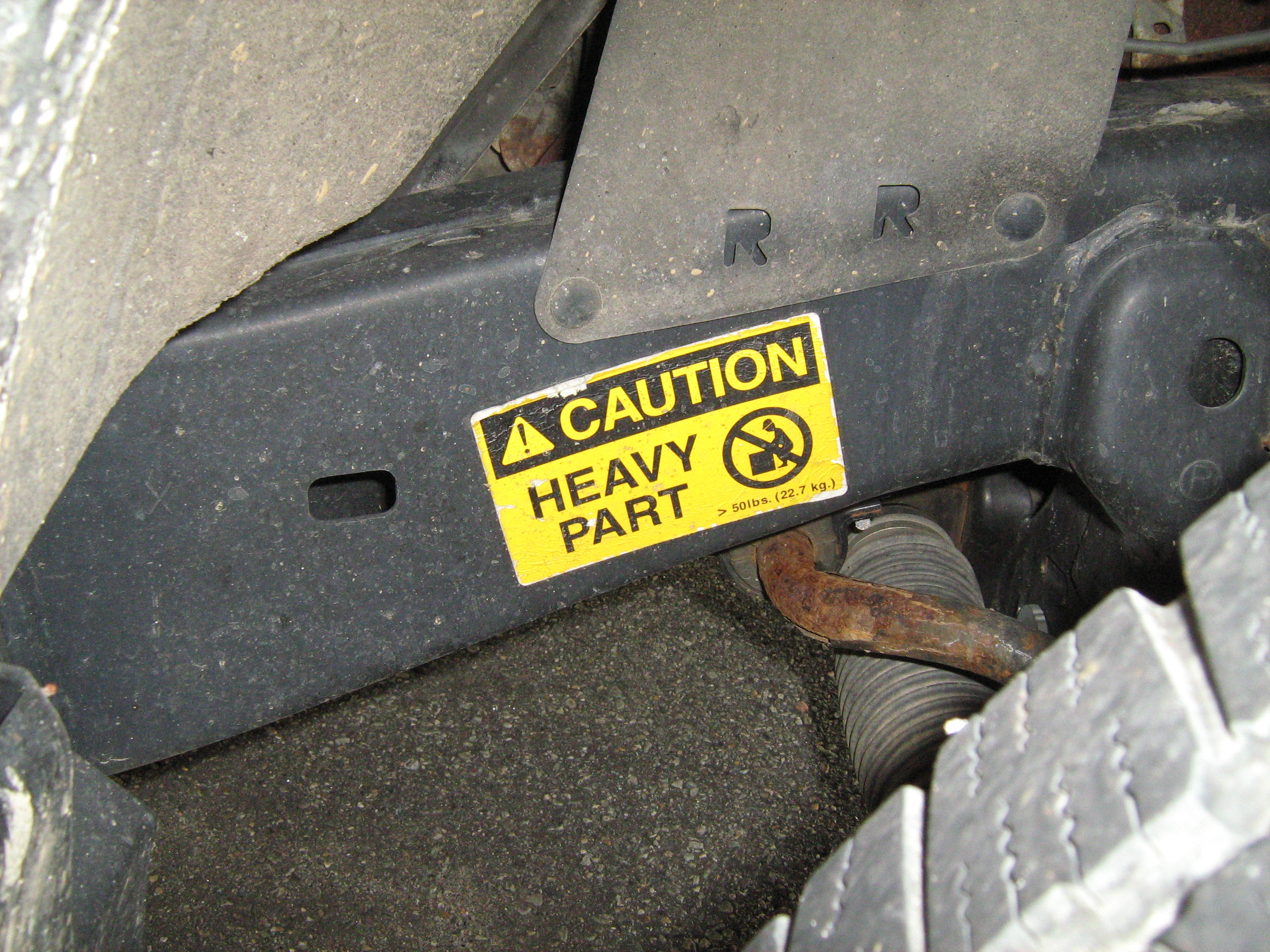
Replacement frame due to excessive rust on a 2000–03 Tundra

During late 2009, Toyota issued a recall on 2000-2003 model year Tundras regarding rust problems of a rear crossmember. This recall involved 110,000 vehicles and followed a similar action for the Sequoia and Tacoma. Tundra owners began complaining of rust issues. In some cases, trucks were inspected by dealers and found to be unsafe to drive. The dealers refused to let the owners take their vehicles without signing an affidavit that they had been informed that Toyota had declared their vehicles unsafe to drive. Complaints were subsequently brought to WCVB-TV Channel 5 investigative reporter Susan Wornick and the story ran repeatedly in spring and fall 2009 prompting the NHTSA to begin an investigation. NHTSA was particularly concerned that owners reported the potential for the spare tire to drop from the vehicle without warning due to corrosion and they opened an investigation on October 6, 2009. Toyota recalled 2000-2001 Tundras, soon expanding it through 2003. If no rust is detected an anti-corrosion compound will be applied, if rust is detected the crossmember will be replaced. While Toyota originally limited the recall to 20 cold-weather states, problems were already evident elsewhere. In March 2010, the recall was expanded throughout the country. Toyota has been replacing frames on affected vehicles rather than paying the 1.5 times Kelley Blue Book value they offered Tacoma owners in a similar campaign for frame rust in Tacomas. Toyota began replacing frames later in the Tacoma campaign.

As of January 2012, Toyota Motor recalled 533,000 trucks and SUVs because of possible steering and suspension problems caused by faulty ball joints. The recall marked a sudden shift in policy for the Japanese automaker after repeatedly denying consumer complaints about ball joint problems and failures in the Tundra and Sequoia. The Toyota recall includes 2004–2007 model year Sequoia full-size sport utility vehicles and 2004–2006 Tundra pickups sold in the U.S. A ball joint in the front suspension may wear out causing the vehicles to be difficult or sometimes impossible to steer. Toyota reported that the defect may be the cause of 11 accidents resulting in six injuries. This could cause the wheel to break off of the lower control arm, cause further damage, and greatly inhibit the ability to control the direction of the truck.

In May 2007, a Toyota spokesperson stated 20 camshaft failures occurred in Toyota's all-new 5.7 L 3UR-FE V8 engine. Toyota said the failures were the result of a flaw in the camshaft casting process, and the supplier of the camshafts has since fixed the error. In the event of a camshaft failure, Toyota will either replace the engine and extend the warranty or repurchase the truck from the owner. Toyota originally intended to begin selling the 5.7L-equipped Tundra during the northern hemisphere summer of 2007 but decided to rush the engine into production in order to match the November 2006 launch date. This decision was the result of product planners and dealers desire for the larger V8's availability at the initial sale.

On December 13, 2007, Toyota Motor Corp recalled 15,600 4×4 2007 model-year Tundras in the United States because a rear propeller shaft joint may fail. According to Toyota, "There is a possibility that a joint in the rear propeller shaft may have been improperly heat-treated, resulting in insufficient hardness ... This may cause a section of the rear propeller shaft to separate at the joint." There has been one reported case of abnormal noises in the affected vehicles. No accidents have been connected to the recall. Tundra owners will be notified beginning in late-December 2007 and are requested to contact their local Toyota dealer for inspection. If the hardness is not correct the dealer will then replace the rear propeller shaft.

The 2007–2010 Tundra was recalled as part of the 2009–10 Toyota vehicle recalls for its accelerator pedal.

Consumer Reports rated the 2013 Toyota Tundra 2WD pickup as having the highest predicted reliability among all full-size pickup trucks. The Toyota Tundra 4WD was rated in second, just below the 2WD model. The Toyota Tundra also was the only full-size pickup to make Consumer Reports most reliable new car and most reliable used cars lists. The Toyota Tundra is recommended by Consumer Reports and is the only full-size truck to have an above-average reliability rating.

The 2022–2023 Tundra was recalled for possible debris left from machining of the engine. This could cause failure of the crank shaft main bearings, leading to reduced power or a stalled condition. This was later extended all non-hybrid Tundras built between December 2022 and February 2024.

== Sales ==
After being on the market for more than a decade, the Tundra had about 17% of the full-size half-ton market.

In 2000, Toyota sold 107,798 Tundras, compared to the Toyota T100 pickup that sold roughly around 50,000 units. By 2005, Toyota managed to sell 126,529 units.

With the added capacity of the San Antonio plant, Toyota planned to sell around 200,000 Tundras for 2007. Toyota missed its sales target for 2007, selling just under 200,000 vehicles. In comparison, for 2007, GMC Sierra sales were over 12,000 more than Tundra, Chevrolet Silverado was more than 422,000 over Tundra, and the Ford F-150 was once again the sales leader with 756,980 units that same year.

Around 70–80% of the Tundra sales were the 5.7 L versions, and 46% were the CrewMax. The standard cab versions were selling at a slower rate than expected.

Calendar year	US (hybrid)	Canada	México
2000	100,445		
2001	108,863		
2002	99,333		
2003	101,316		
2004	112,484		
2005	126,529	1,260	
2006	124,508	2,569	
2007	196,555	11,552	401
2008	137,249	9,477	517
2009	79,385	7,637	1,362
2010	93,309	7,560	703
2011	82,908	6,847	290
2012	101,621	7,241	330
2013	112,732	7,535	233
2014	118,493	9,769	196
2015	118,880	10,829	497
2016	115,489	11,364	473
2017	116,285	9,442	472
2018	118,258	11,738	281
2019	111,673	9,966	178
2020	109,203	11,053	162
2021	81,959	6,653	182
2022	104,246 (15,011)	11,561	372
2023	125,185 (30,303)	13,365	
2024	159,528 (37,010)		
2025	147,610 (30,549)		

=== International markets ===
As of 2015, the Tundra was sold in the United States, Canada, Mexico, Panama, Honduras, Bolivia, Chile, and the French territory of New Caledonia in left-hand drive (LHD) configuration only.

The Tundra also has a grey import presence in several countries that include Japan, Taiwan, China, Australia, the Philippines, Cambodia, Switzerland, the Middle East, and Sweden.

Three hundred Tundra trucks are being leased in Australia, starting in November 2023, as part of Toyota Australia's testing program whereby feedback is sought from the lessees. These trucks are assembled in the U.S. and remanufactured to RHD by the Walkinshaw Group. Toyota Australia and Toyota Motor Company eventually announced in November 2024 to sell the Tundra in the Australian market starting from Q2 2025.

The Tundra, imported from the United States, is scheduled to be officially introduced in Japan during 2026.

== Hallmarks ==
=== NASCAR ===
In 2004, the Tundra joined the NASCAR Craftsman Truck Series and got its first win at Michigan International Speedway on July 31 that year. In 2006, the Tundra got Toyota's first manufacturer championship winning 12 of the 25 races. The model also got the driver and owner championship with Todd Bodine and Germain Racing. The truck won every year from 2006 to 2018.

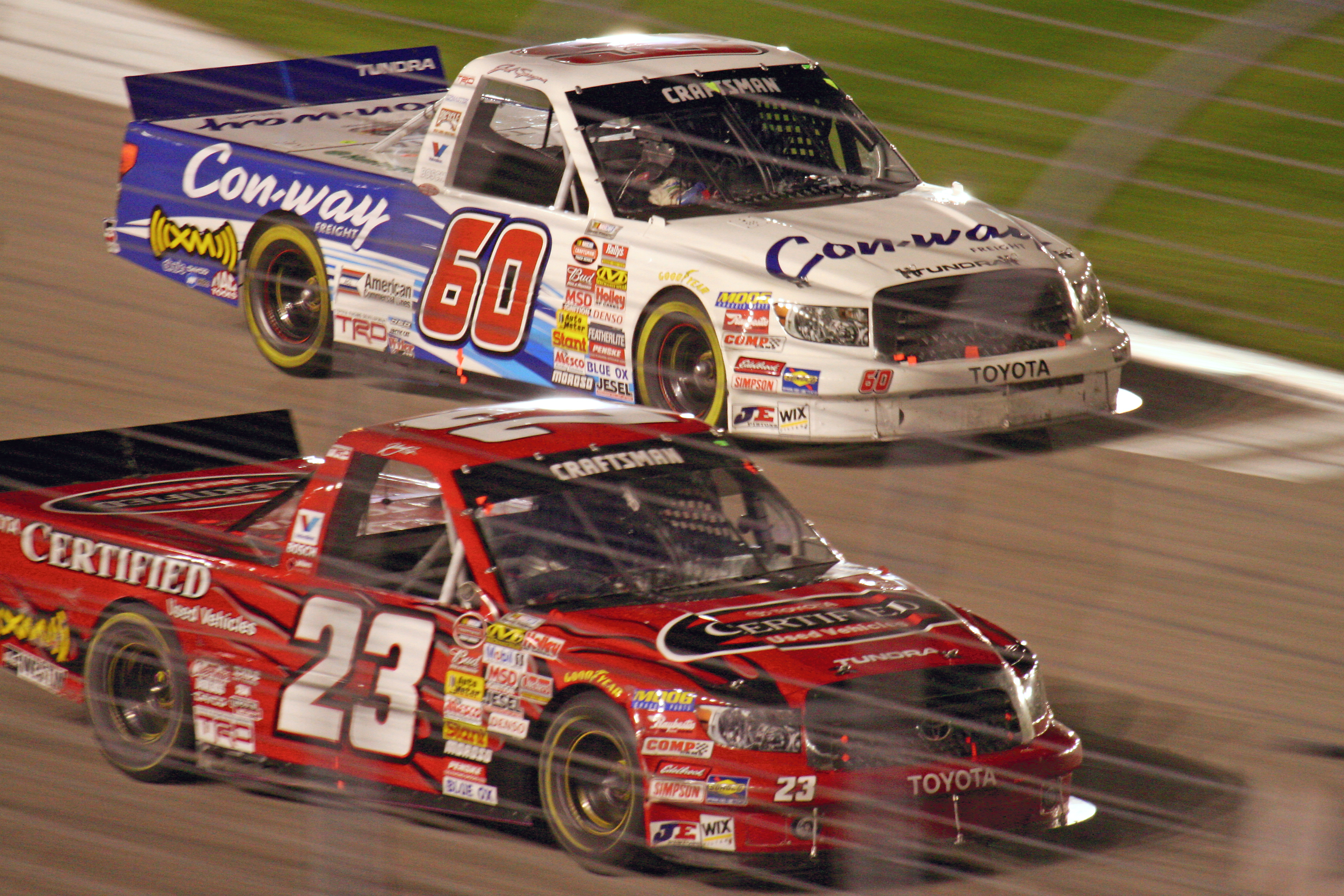
NASCAR Toyota Tundras

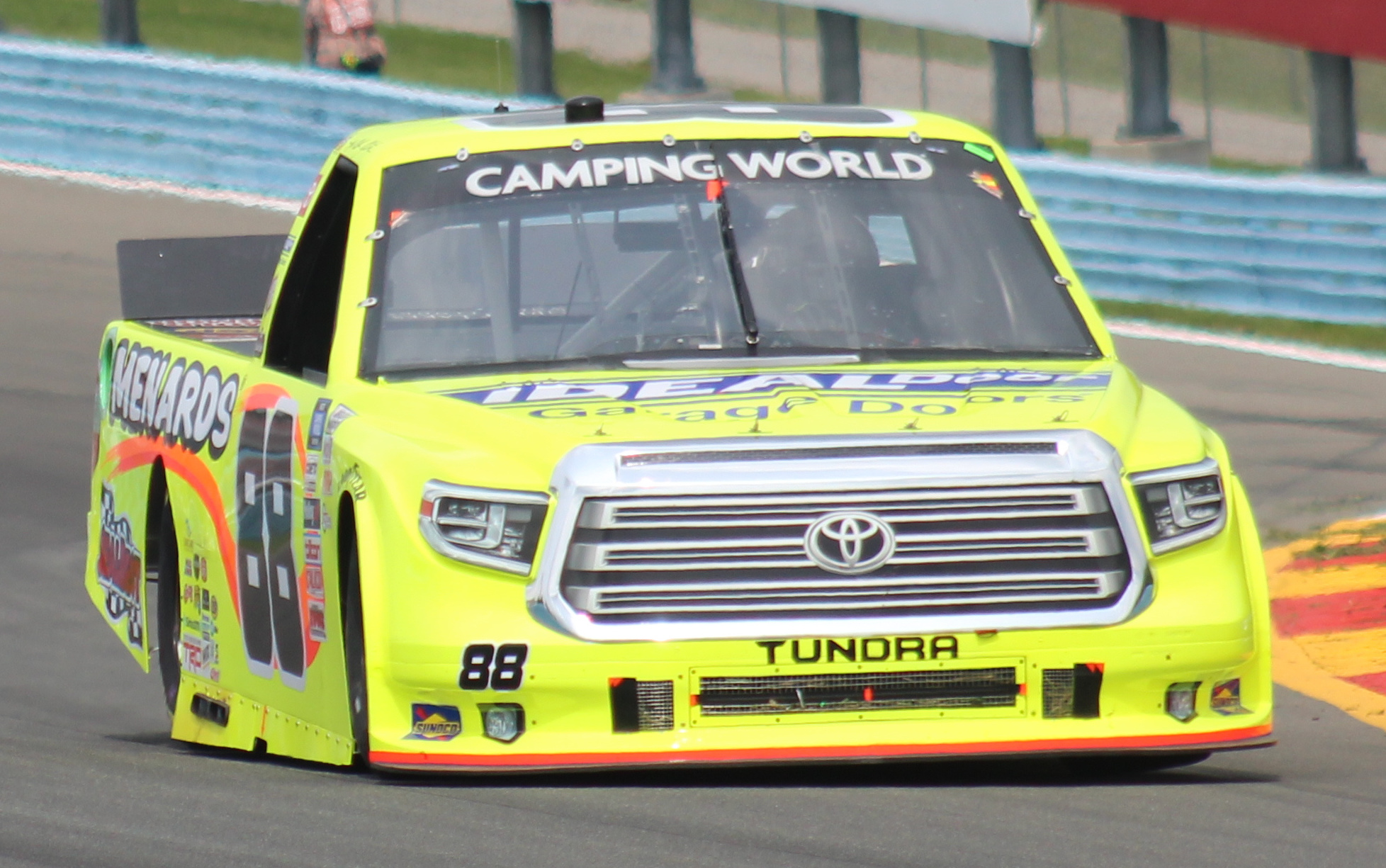
Toyota Tundra NASCAR truck, raced by Matt Crafton at Watkins Glen

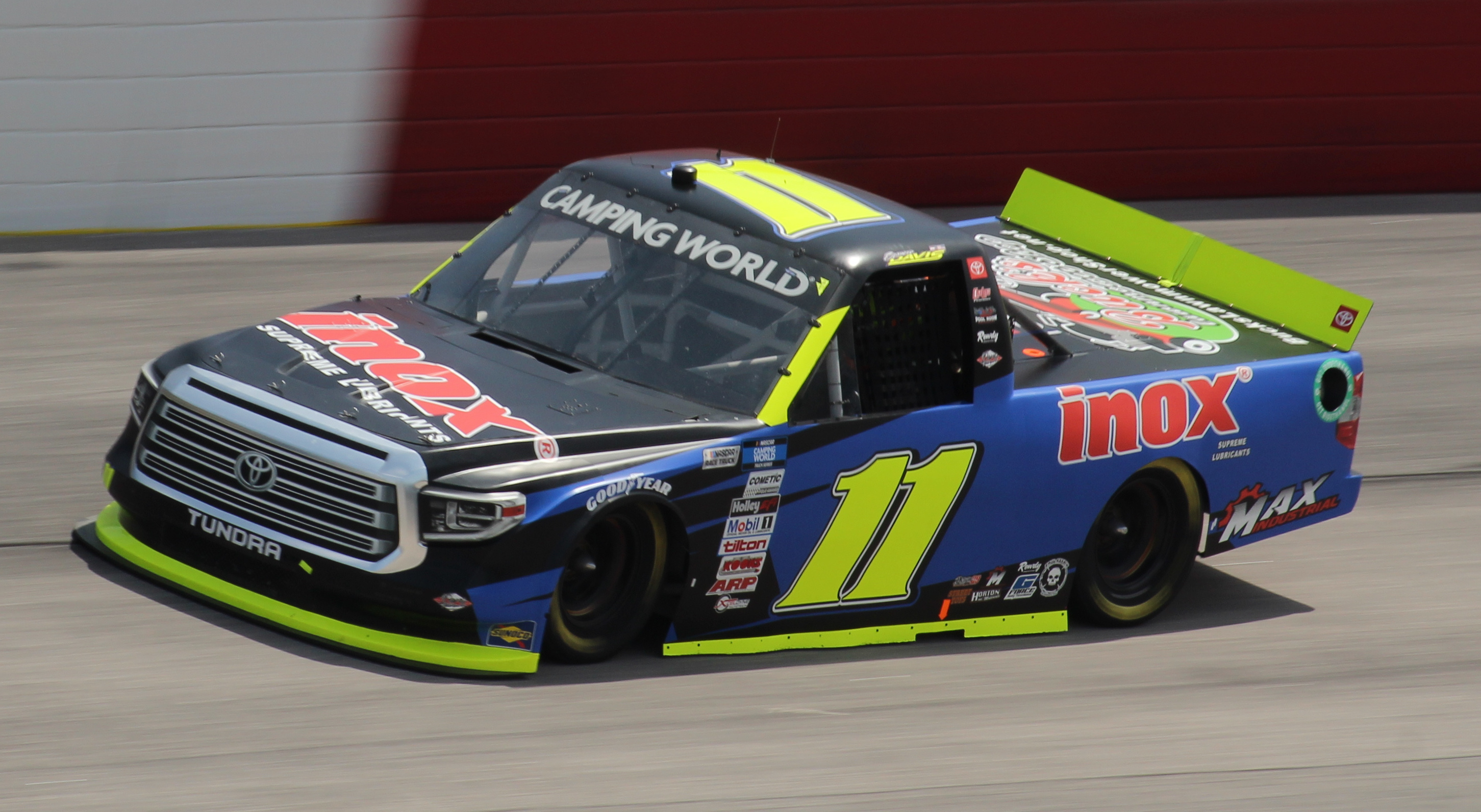
Spencer Davis' truck

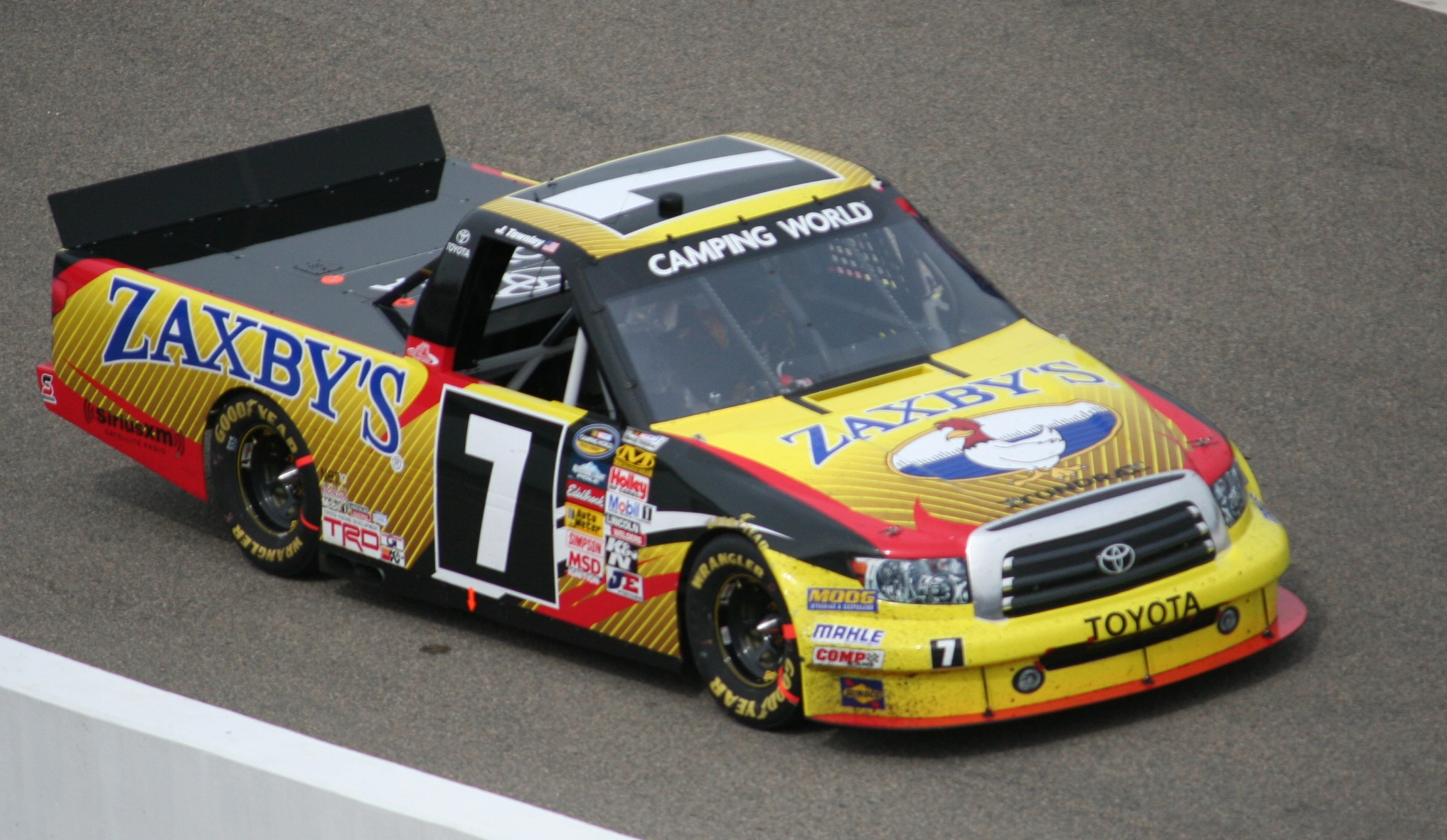
2013 Toyota Tundra

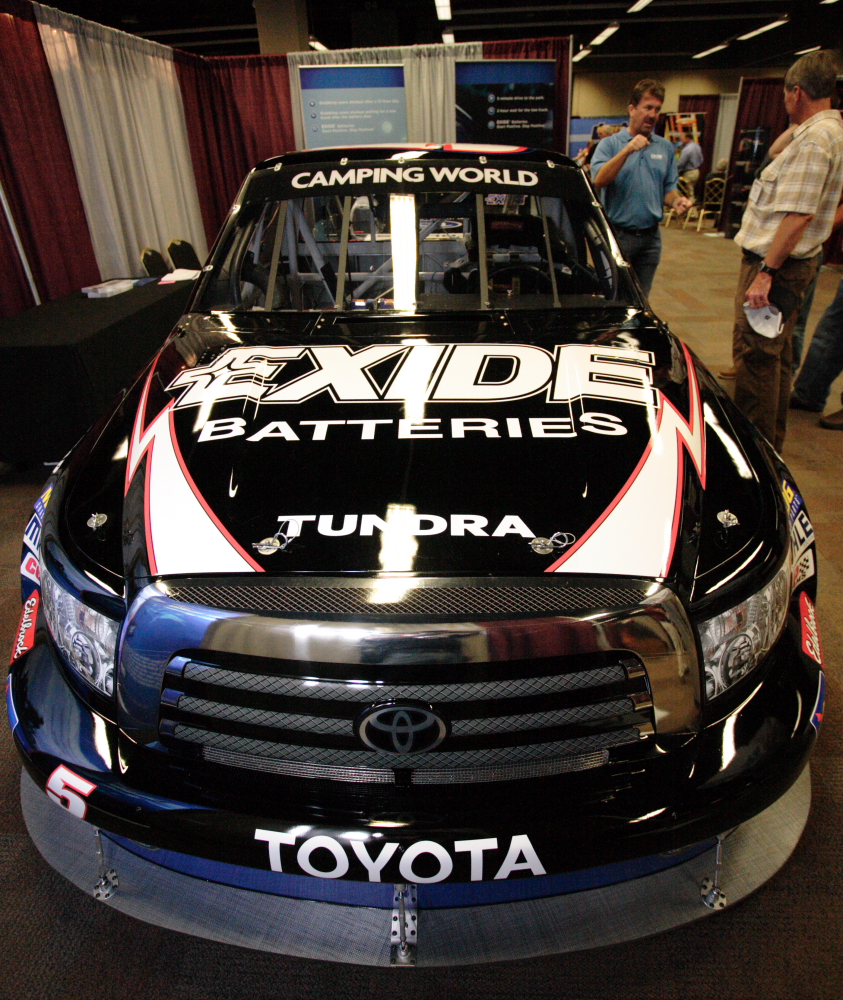
Mike Skinner's #5 Toyota Truck

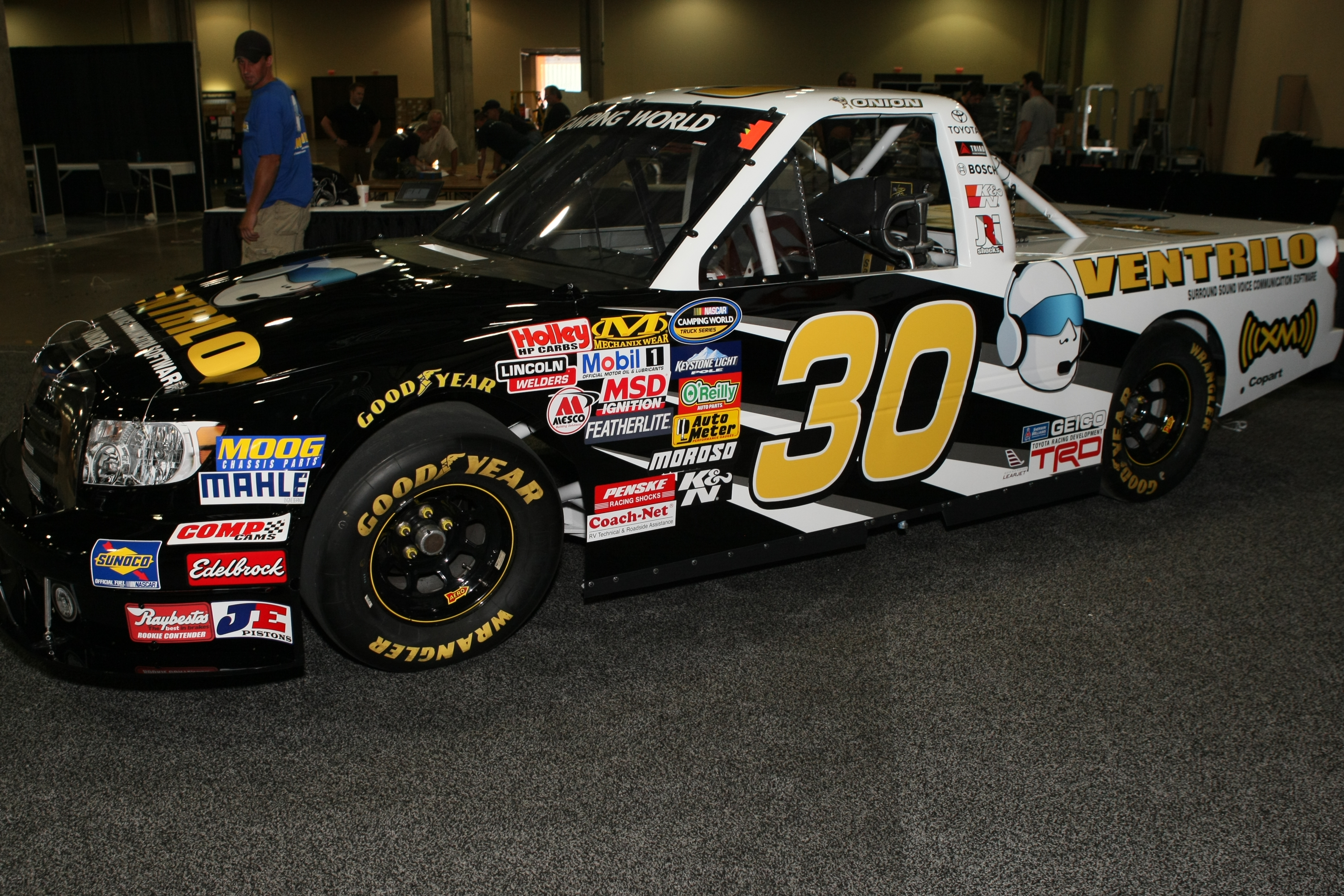
2009 Toyota Tundra NASCAR

=== Pulling the Space Shuttle Endeavour ===
On Friday, October 12, 2012, an unmodified, Toyota Tundra Crew Max pulled the Space Shuttle Endeavour, on top of a special lightweight dolly, across the Manchester Boulevard bridge over Interstate 405. The shuttle's 12-mile (19 km) journey to the California Science Center was primarily performed by four self-propelled robotic transporters. However, due to weight restrictions on the bridge, the shuttle was moved to a lighter non-powered dolly and towed the short distance by the Tundra. Once it had completely crossed the bridge, the shuttle was returned to the robotic transporters to continue its course. Toyota also used this opportunity to film a commercial that aired during the 2013 Super Bowl.

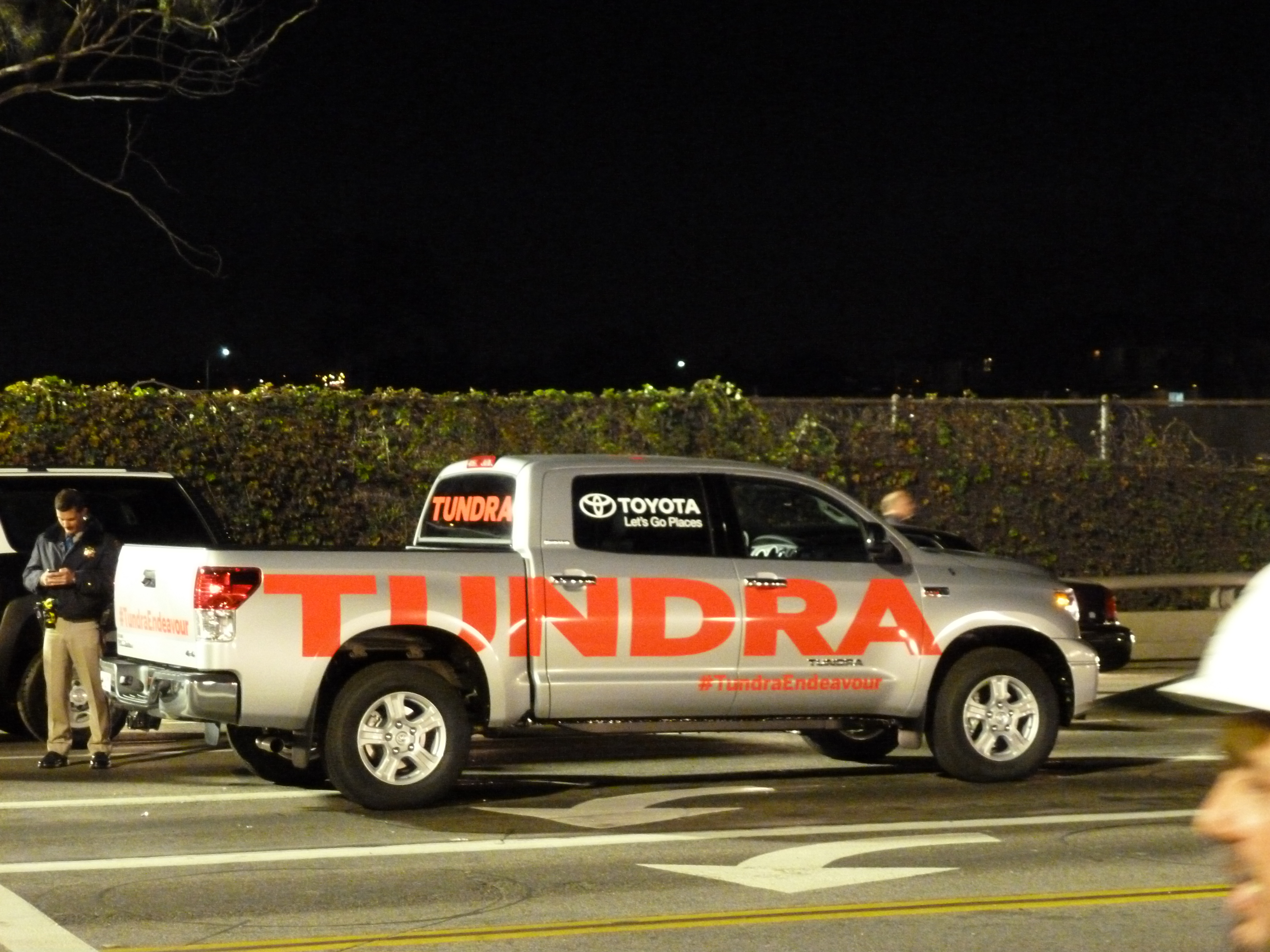
The Toyota Tundra that pulled the Endeavour

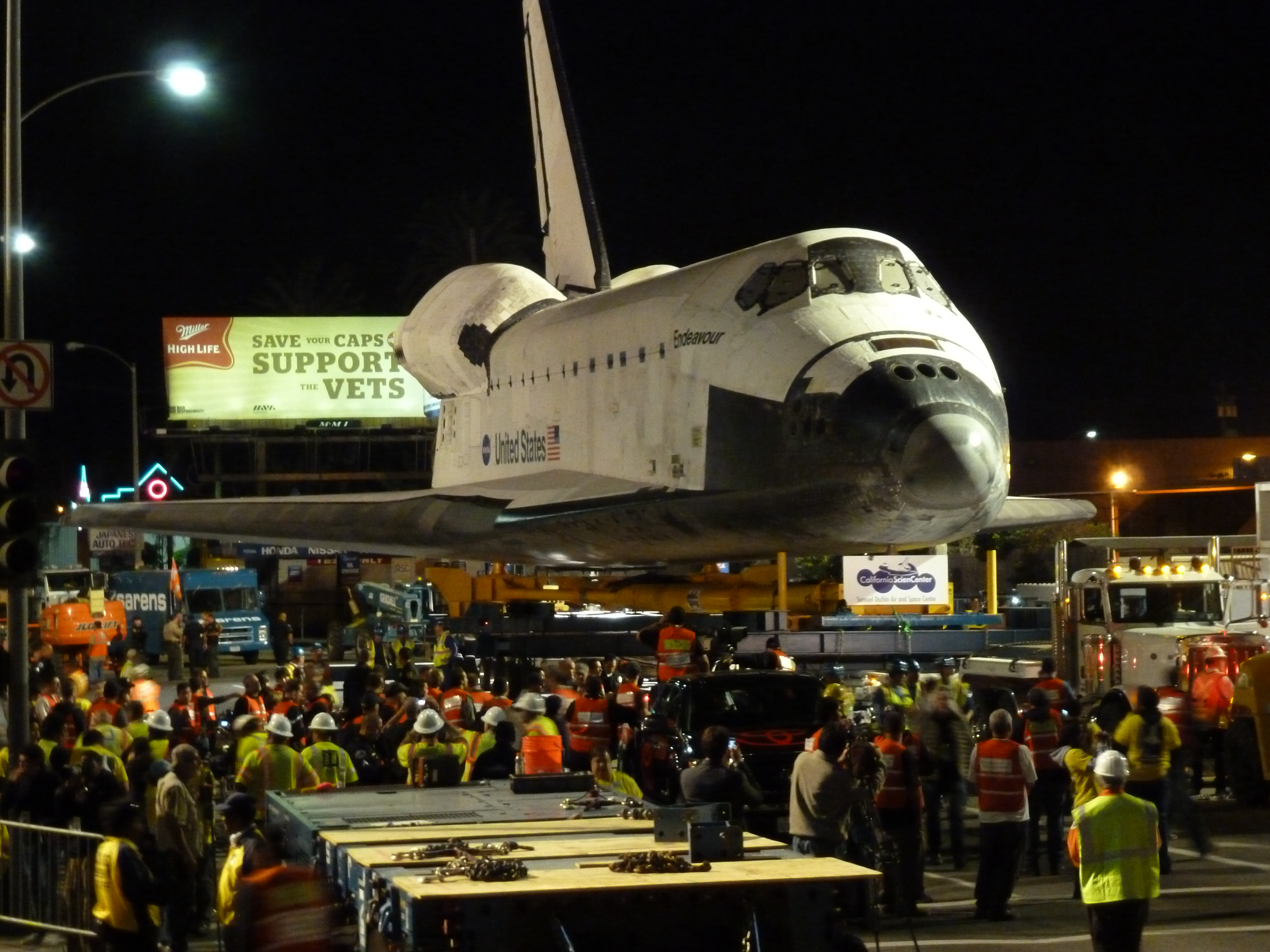
The shuttle awaits to be towed

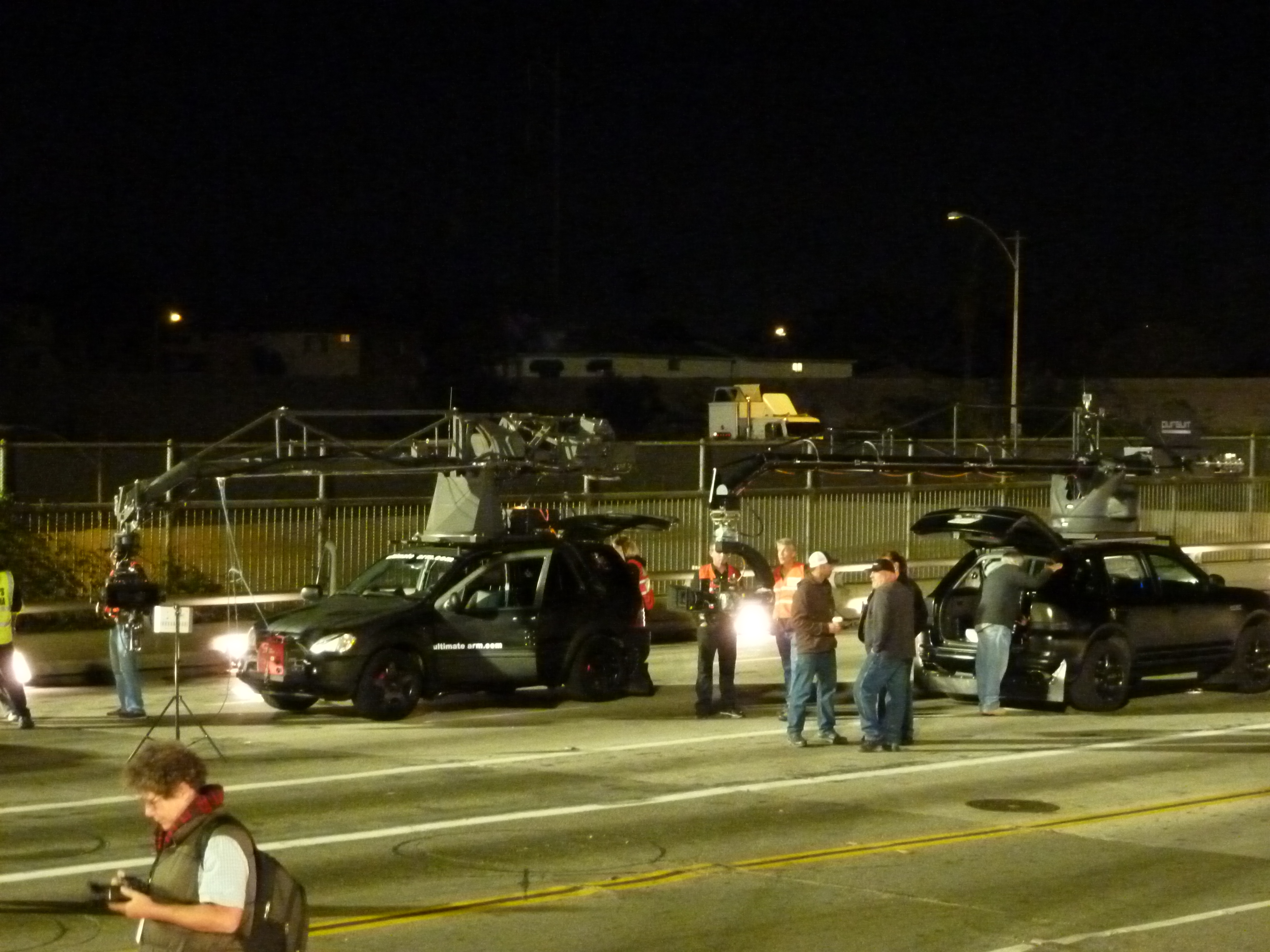
The cars that filmed the event

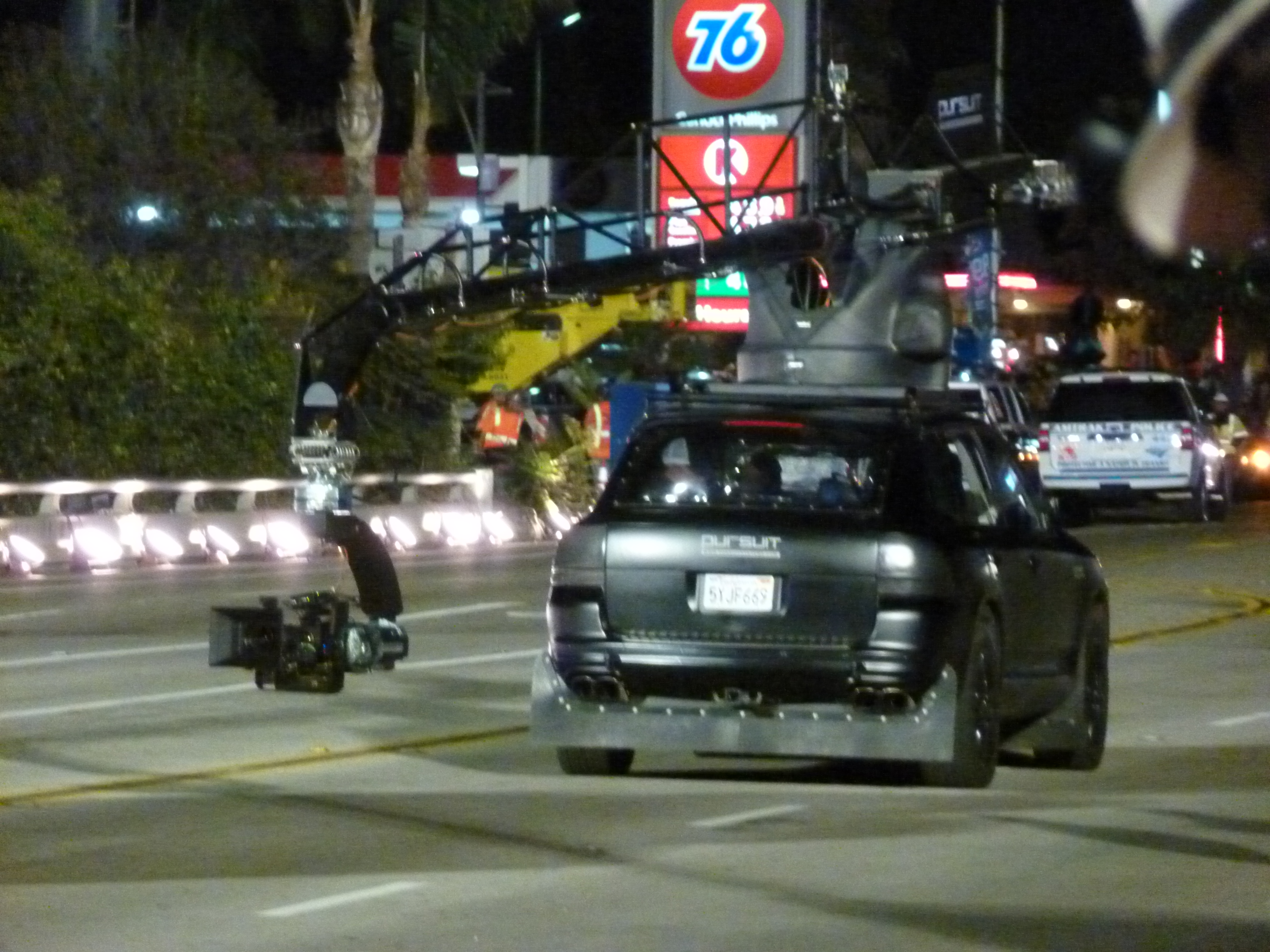
Close up of one of the filming cars

=== Million-mile Tundra ===
In 2016, Victor Sheppard of Houma, Louisiana, clocked in over 1,000,000 miles (1,600,000 km) on his 2007 Tundra. In the eight years of owning the truck, he logged in an average of 125,000 miles (200,000 km) a year and had it serviced at his local dealership a total of 117 times. Toyota Motor Sales, U.S.A., Inc. gave Sheppard a 2016 model year Tundra in exchange for his old truck; the company disassembled the old truck to study its durability and reliability. Nearly every component of the truck was still fully functioning, and only the bed was showing signs of stress and use because it had been used to transport heavy equipment. This truck and everything learned from it aided in the development of the third generation Tundra.
