= Greg Foutz =

American off-road race driver and Ford race-truck builder

- Nationality: (United States) American
- Born: United States
- Current team: Foutz Motorsports
- Former teams: Team Trophylite
- Championships: 4 class championships

Awards
- 4 Baja 1000 class wins

Greg Foutz is an American off-road race driver, race-truck builder, and entrepreneur based in Mesa, Arizona. He is the founder and owner of Foutz Motorsports LLC, a company that builds production-based off-road race trucks and manufactures aftermarket suspension, chassis-protection, and storage components, primarily for Ford Motor Company platforms. He has been credited with four class championships and four Baja 1000 class wins, and has served as Ford's primary stock-class race-truck builder on a series of production-based off-road programs, including the F-250 Super Duty, F-150 SVT Raptor and Raptor R, the 3.5-liter EcoBoost-powered F-150, and later-generation F-150 Raptor and Bronco Raptor race trucks.

Foutz is also the founder of GunMount (gunmount.com), a vehicle-mounted firearm storage product line launched in 2016, and Adapt-A-Panel (adaptapanel.com), a patent-pending modular gear-mounting system introduced in 2020. The Foutz Motorsports off-road race trucks were also licensed as the featured vehicles in the TrophyLite Rally Racing video game released by Phoenix-based 2XL Games in 2010. Foutz is a contributing author at Springfield Armory’s outdoor lifestyle publication The Armory Life as well.

== Off-road racing career ==
=== Early years and Stock Mini class ===
Foutz has been involved with Ford Motor Company in off-road competition since 1996. His team won its first Baja 1000 in 1996 in SCORE's Stock Mini class, racing a Ford Ranger pickup.

=== F-250 Super Duty Stock Full program ===
In 1998, Foutz was selected by Ford Motor Company to build the first F-250 Super Duty to compete in SCORE's Stock Full truck class. That same year, the team won the Vegas to Reno off-road race, then the longest off-road race in the United States. The build was profiled in a contemporaneous Off-Road.com project feature on the "Stock Full" F-250 Super Duty race truck.

In 2009, Foutz Motorsports won its class at the Best in the Desert Vegas to Reno race in a Ford F-250, finishing more than two hours ahead of the second-place truck driven by Randy Merritt.

=== 2008 Ford F-150 SVT Raptor R (Baja 1000) ===
For the 2008 Baja 1000, the Ford F-150 SVT Raptor R race truck was developed as a collaboration between Ford Special Vehicle Team (SVT), Ford Racing, and Foutz Motorsports Inc., based on the upcoming 2010 production Ford F-150 SVT Raptor. The truck completed the 631-mile event in 25 hours, 28 minutes and 10 seconds and finished third in the SCORE Class 8 division. The drivers of record were Steve Olliges, Randy Merritt, Greg Foutz, Bud Brutsman, and SVT vehicle development engineer Gene Martindale.

The 2008 effort was the subject of a feature-length documentary, “Raptor: Born in Baja,” produced by Brentwood Communications with Ford Motor Company. The film premiered at the Egyptian Theatre in Hollywood on June 23, 2009; a one-hour television cut aired on Speed on July 12, 2009.

The retrospective DrivingLine feature “Ford’s Baja Truck History Helped Build The F-150 Raptor Into The Off-Road Weapon It Is Today” identified the 2008 entry as “fairly close to the stock version that went on sale as a 2010 model” and credited it with providing “exceptional hardcore testing for its chassis and drivetrain.”

=== 2010 EcoBoost F-150 Baja 1000 ===
Foutz Motorsports prepared and campaigned the 2011 Ford F-150 EcoBoost race truck used by Ford to validate the new 3.5-liter EcoBoost V6 engine at the 2010 SCORE Baja 1000. The truck completed the 1,061-mile course in 38 hours, 20 minutes.

=== 2017 Ford F-150 Raptor program ===
In 2016, Ford selected Foutz Motorsports to build a stock-bodied second-generation Ford F-150 Raptor race truck around the all-new twin-turbo 3.5-liter EcoBoost V6 and 10-speed transmission. The program was announced ahead of the 2016 Best in the Desert season, with The Detroit News reporting on Ford's decision to enter the new Raptor in BITD's factory stock class. The truck was unveiled at the 2016 SEMA Show in Las Vegas.

During the 2016 BITD season, the team contested the Parker 425, Mint 400, Laughlin Desert Classic, Vegas to Reno, and Bluewater Challenge. At the 49th Baja 1000 in November 2016, the Foutz team—Greg Foutz, Tim Casey, John Swift, and Andy Waters—finished third in the Stock Full class, placing 142nd overall after 35 hours, 59 minutes, and 8 seconds of competition, with approximately 52 seconds to spare under the 36-hour cutoff. Motor Authority reported that the truck was "almost fully stock," with Foutz adding only a safety cage, puncture-resistant fuel cell, racing seats, and an LED lighting package, and re-valving the Fox shocks for the added weight; after the race, the team drove the truck home to Phoenix.

=== Trophylite, Team Trophylite, and the 6100 / Spec TT class ===
Foutz Motorsports has been credited with originating the 6100 / Spec TT class, which the company developed in 2010 as a spec-built truck class for the Trophylite series. The first chassis was constructed for Jim Riley of Azuñia Tequila and debuted at the Best in the Desert Vegas to Reno race, completing the event without major incident. Off-Road.com later reported that the series added a Ford 5.0-liter V8 ("Z-tech") engine option alongside the existing GM package, working with Foutz Motorsports on integration with Trophylite's T-350 transmission.

In 2009, Foutz competed in the SCORE Baja 1000 in a Trophylite truck (Class 7.2) alongside Mike West and Richard Cassey, with the team taking the class win in under 27 hours.

== Foutz Motorsports ==
Foutz Motorsports LLC is headquartered in Mesa, Arizona. Founded in the late 1990s, the company markets itself as "Making Off-Road Great Since 1998." The firm designs and manufactures suspension, bed-cage, light-mount, GPS-mount, and chassis-protection products for the Ford F-150 Raptor (Generations 1 through 3.5), Ford Ranger Raptor, Ford Bronco Raptor, Ford F-150, Ford Super Duty, Ram 1500 TRX and RHO, and 4th-generation Toyota Tacoma platforms. The company has been described as "the team Ford trusts with their Raptor race program," with origins in the 2008 collaborative Raptor R Baja 1000 build.

In 2010, the company licensed its race trucks as the featured vehicles in TrophyLite Rally Racing, a mobile and tablet off-road racing game developed by Phoenix-based studio 2XL Games and based on the General Tire TrophyLite Desert Race Series. The game's in-app environment and continuing feature updates were built using a tool developed by Foutz's software venture, Blackbox Interactive.

== Television and commentary ==
Foutz has worked as an on-air commentator for the Best in the Desert racing series. His race trucks and Ford race builds have been featured in news coverage by The Detroit News, Autoblog, Motor Authority, DrivingLine, Off-Road.com, Motorsport.com, Equipment World, Phoenix New Times, and Off Road Xtreme.

== GunMount and Adapt-A-Panel ==
Foutz is the founder and owner of the GunMount product line, which he launched in 2016 after being approached to build custom rifle carriers for trucks used in high-speed off-road chase support. The line includes a front-seat AR-15 rifle mount and an under-steering-column pistol mount, which the company has identified as its most popular products.

In 2020, he introduced Adapt-A-Panel, a patent-pending modular grid panel system that allows users to configure firearm, tool, and gear mounts in seat-back, roof, bed-wall, and backpack-insert applications. The product uses a grid layout that accepts MOLLE-compatible accessories and rotating grid inserts to match different bolt patterns.

== Writing ==
Foutz is listed as a contributing author at The Armory Life, the digital outdoor lifestyle publication of Springfield Armory, where his published work includes the 2021 feature article "Adapt-A-Panel Gear: Stay Armed In Your Vehicle".

== Selected race results ==
Year	Event	Vehicle / Class	Result	Notes
1996	SCORE Baja 1000	Ford Ranger / Stock Mini	Class win	First Baja 1000 class win for the team
1998	BITD Vegas to Reno	Ford F-250 Super Duty / Stock Full	Class win	First F-250 Super Duty entered in Stock Full class; profiled by Off-Road.com
2008	SCORE Baja 1000	Ford F-150 SVT Raptor R / Class 8	3rd in class	Inaugural Raptor race entry; finish time 25:28:10; subject of "Raptor: Born in Baja" documentary
2009	BITD Vegas to Reno	Ford F-250 / Stock Full	Class win	Won by more than two hours
2009	SCORE Baja 1000	Trophylite / Class 7.2	Class win	Co-drove with Mike West and Richard Cassey; under 27 hours
2010	SCORE Baja 1000	Ford F-150 EcoBoost (3.5L V6)	Class finish	1,061 miles in 38 h 20 min, EcoBoost engine validation
2016	SCORE Baja 1000 (49th)	2017 Ford F-150 Raptor / Stock Full	3rd in class	142nd overall; 35 h 59 min 8 s, ~;52 seconds under cutoff; covered by Motor Authority

== See also ==
- Ford F-150 SVT Raptor
- Ford F-150 Raptor
- Baja 1000
- Best in the Desert
- SCORE International
- Trophy truck
