= Norman Motorsports =

San Diego's Offroad Racing Team

Norman Motorsports is the professional Trophy Truck #8 offroad racing team based in San Diego, California. It is owned and operated by Roger Norman. The team races in numerous off-road circuits, including SCORE/Tecate Baja series and Best In The Desert.

In the first year of racing the SCORE points series, the team took home the overall win at the Terribles Primm 300. In 2025, Norman Motorsports finished in 8th place in the Trophy Truck category in the Baja 1000.

A video game (Baja: Edge of Control) was released at the end of September 2008 for Xbox 360 and PlayStation 3 featuring the #8 Norman Motorsports trophy truck in team livery. The game was created by 2XL Games of Phoenix, Arizona.

== Operations ==
Norman Motorsports is moving into a new 16,400-square-foot (1,520 m^{2}) facility located at 9434 Bond Avenue in El Cajon, California. The new facility will be ready in January 2009 and is located next door to Fortin Transmissions and near Ivan Stewart's Pro Truck, Paul Mishell's Racer Services and McMillin Racing's facility. Currently Norman Motorsports is leasing 7,000 square feet (650 m^{2}) at Wide Open in Irvine, California. El Cajon and Lakeside have the largest concentration of off-road businesses, teams, and enthusiasts in the country. It is also where the off-road business first took root in the United States.

== Races ==
SCORE/Tecate Baja 1000, Baja 500, San Felipe 250 and Best in the Desert (BiTD) Vegas to Reno.

== Drivers ==
Roger Norman, Larry Roeseler, Larry Ragland, Rhys Millen
