= J. N. Roberts =

American motorcycle racer (1941–2026)

James Nelson Roberts
- Born: James Nelson Roberts; December 12, 1941; Evansville, Indiana, U.S.
- Died: August 18, 2026 (aged 83); Helena, Montana, U.S.
- Other name: J. N. Roberts
- Occupations: Motorcycle racer, film industry stuntman
- Years active: 1969–1997

James Nelson Roberts II (December 12, 1941 – August 18, 2026) was an American professional off-road and enduro motorcycle racer and a film industry stuntman. In the 1960s and early 1970s, he was a dominant motorcycle competitor in American desert racing centered in the Mojave Desert of Southern California. At one point in his desert racing career, Roberts won 27 consecutive desert races, earning him the unofficial nickname of King of the Desert. Roberts was inducted into the AMA Motorcycle Hall of Fame in 1999 and, into the Off-road Motorsports Hall of Fame in 2009. He is also a member of the Hollywood Stuntmen's Hall Of Fame.

== Desert racing career ==
James Nelson Roberts II was born on December 12, 1941, in Evansville, Indiana, and grew up nearby. He moved to Southern California in the 1960s after serving in Okinawa with the United States Marine Corps. He worked as a carpenter on film sets at Universal Studios and, began competing in off-road desert motorcycle races during his spare time.

When Roberts began his desert racing career in the early 1960s, most desert racers preferred heavy, ungainly, British parallel twin cylinder motorcycles. He was among the first desert racers to adopt lighter motorcycles with single cylinder, two-stroke engines. Despite the horsepower advantage of the larger motorcycles, Roberts' Husqvarna motorcycle weighed only 245 pounds making it more nimble and agile than the larger motorcycles. Where riders of larger motorcycles tended to use speed and momentum to plough through desert obstacles, Roberts appeared to be dancing away from obstacles, standing upright on the foot pegs, rarely sitting down. He began recording victories in the huge AMA District 37 desert races against as many as 1,000 competitors.

Roberts teamed with Malcolm Smith to win the motorcycle division in the 1967 Mexican 1000, later to be known as the Baja 1000. He won the Barstow to Vegas desert race four times in a row. He also won the Mint 400, the Baja 500 and the Baja 1000 twice each. Roberts also represented the United States at the 1971 and 1972 International Six Days Trial. The International Six Days Trial is a form of off-road motorcycle Olympics that is the oldest annual competition sanctioned by the FIM, dating back to 1913.

Roberts pioneered a number of safety innovations in the field of off-road racing. He did this by incorporating protective gear from other sports with his own: bolting a football helmet face guard to his motorcycle helmet, wearing football shoulder pads, (as well as a baseball catcher's shin guards). These changes were considered to be the first steps in the evolution of modern safety equipment.

== Film industry career ==
Following in the footsteps of fellow Motorcycle Hall of Fame members Carey Loftin and Bud Ekins, Roberts began to work in the film industry where his riding talents made him useful as a stuntman. During his desert racing career, Roberts became acquainted with fellow motorcyclist and future film director, Hal Needham. After Needham had established himself as a successful director, he discovered that Roberts was a carpenter at Universal Studios, and decided to help Roberts become a stuntman. Needham helped Roberts get a job on the film Little Big Man (1970), where he dressed and painted up to portray one of the Sioux and Cheyenne who attacked General Custer in the film. Roberts impressed observers with a motorcycle stunt in the film Suppose They Gave a War and Nobody Came (1970) and, doubled for Paul Newman for motorcycle scenes in the film, Sometimes a Great Notion (1970). His best known stunt work occurred during motorcycle chase scenes in the Charles Bronson films The Mechanic (1972) and The Stone Killer (1973).

As his career progressed, Roberts moved from specializing in horses to specializing in violent car chases and crashes. Roberts also had small acting roles in thirteen films. Needham inducted Roberts into the Viewfinders motorcycle club, an extremely exclusive club of fellow stuntmen and Hollywood actors who also competed in motorcycle desert races. Other members included Needham, Pernell Roberts from Bonanza and Steve McQueen.

== Death ==
Roberts died on August 18, 2026, at the age of 84.

== Awards ==
Roberts was inducted into the AMA Motorcycle Hall of Fame in 1999. In 2009, Roberts was inducted into the Off-road Motorsports Hall of Fame.

Roberts appeared in the motorcycle documentary films On Any Sunday (1971), Dust to Glory (2005), and in Full Circle, The Legend Lives (2008).
