= Roger Norman (racing driver) =

American racing driver

Roger Norman is an American professional offroad racing competitor. He has raced in numerous off-road circuits, including SCORE International/Tecate Baja series and Best In The Desert (BITD). In late 2012 Norman purchased the SCORE International series from Sal Fish.

== Personal life ==
Roger Norman was born in Washington. Norman is the husband to Elise Norman. His mother is Fran Muncey and his late stepfather is Bill Muncey. This stepfather is a hall of fame unlimited hydroplane racer who won 62 races and 8 gold cups. Roger's father Don R. Norman had a passion for off-roading and brought Roger into the sport. Don Norman is 78 years of age recently competed in the SCORE Baja 1000 for the first time along with seven other family members. The car was sponsored by Roger Norman and finished 3rd in class and 119th overall.

Norman began building his construction and real estate business at a young age and moved to Reno, Nevada.

== Racing career ==
=== 1990s ===
In 1996, Norman entered the Vegas to Reno race with motorcycle icon Chris Haines in a Class 1 car. Their wives were the only pit crew they had. He soon found himself part of Rod Hall’s factory-backed Hummer team in 1998, and by 1999, he and Hall had won the BITD championship.

=== 2000s ===
In 2001 Norman won the SCORE International Baja 1000 with Chad Hall in a factory backed Hummer H-1. He claimed a victory in the Wide Open Baja Challenge in 2004 co-driving with Bob Sutton, Rod Millen and actor Paul Newman. That win was repeated in 2005 with Sutton, Millen and Mike “Mouse” McCoy. In the 2006 BITD Vegas to Reno, he teamed with Reno friend John Harrah in Class 1500 to post a third in class and sixth overall performance – that was exactly 10 years after his first desert race. 2008 marked Norman's first season in the SCORE Trophy Truck division. Norman and Larry Roeseler took home the overall winner and 1st in Class at the 2008 Terrible's SCORE Primm 300 in Primm, NV. and the SCORE Baja 1000 overall.

== Norman Motorsports ==
Norman started Norman Motorsports as a professional off-road racing team. The fleet consists of 3 racing Trophy Trucks and 2 Trophy Truck Pre-runners.
