= Gus Vildósola =

Mexican Off-Road Racer

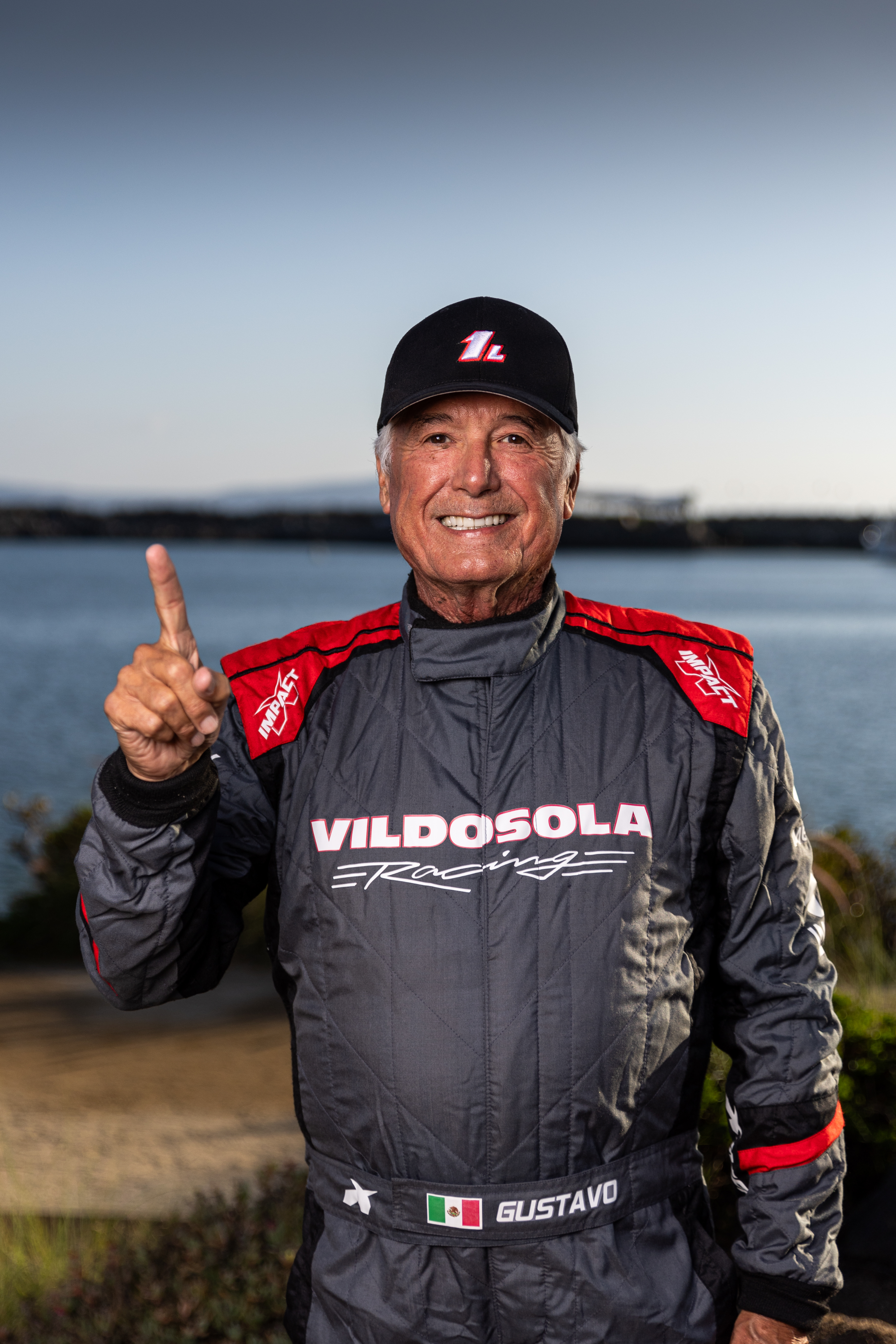
GVR.

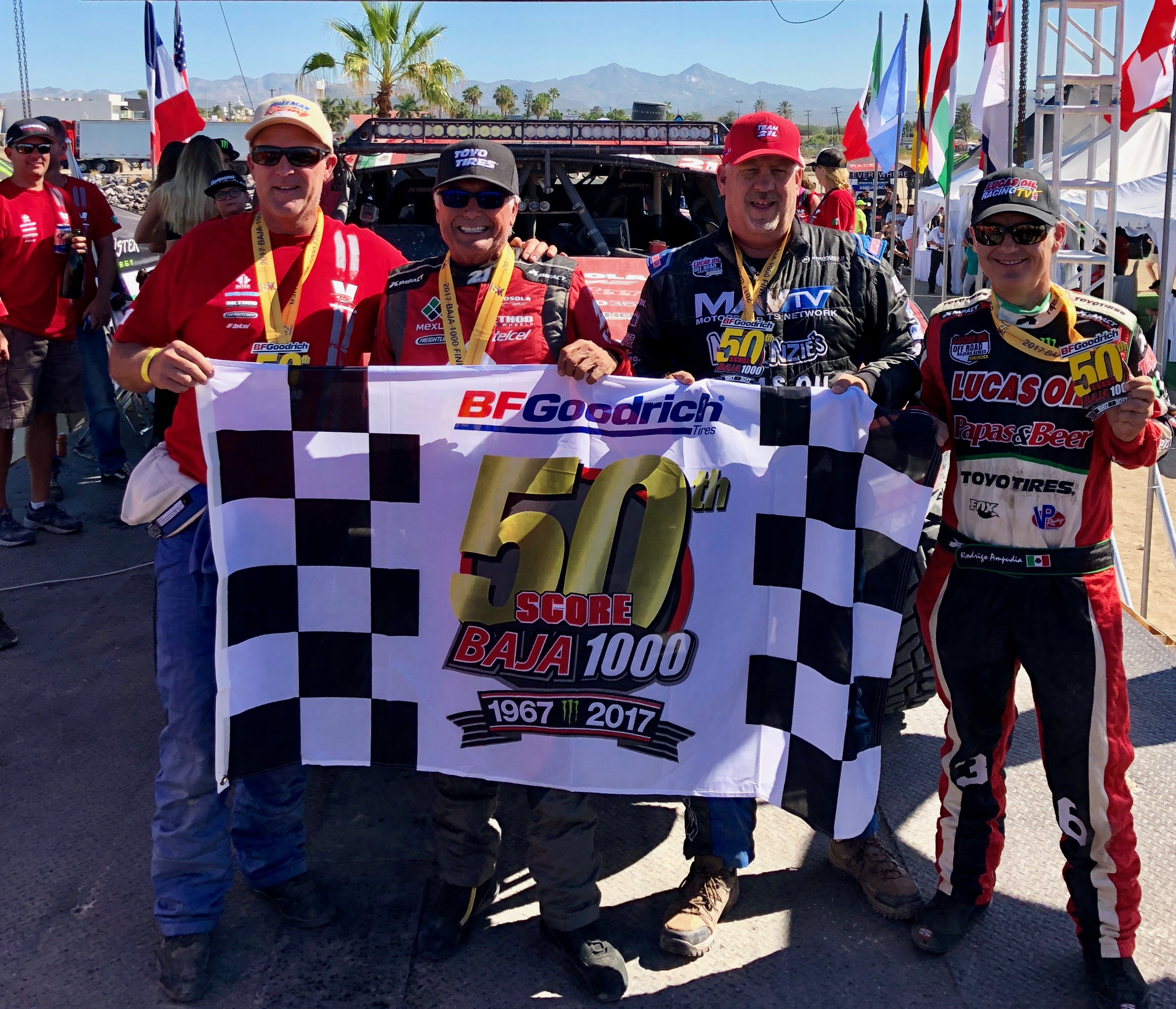
Gus Vildosola with Team 12L at the 2017 Baja 1000 finish line with Mike Coleman, Scott Bailey and Rodrigo Ampudia

Gustavo Vildósola Ramos (born May 19, 1953, in Mexicali, Baja California, Mexico) is a Mexican off-road racer and entrepreneur.

== Racing career ==
Gustavo Vildósola Sr also known as "GVR" has been in off-road racing since 1968. He started racing in local races in the Mexicali area.

Vildosola had his first taste of the Baja 1000 in 1984 when one of his cousins invited him to race with him in a 5-1600. In 1995, he decided to build his own 5-1600. He quickly jumped into larger engine vehicles.

In 1996, Ivan Stewart built a ProTruck for him which he raced for two years and achieved a second place in the championship.

Vildósola raced in the a SCORE Class 1 buggy from 1998 to 2001. The next year he moved on to the premiere class, the Trophy Trucks.

In 2003, Vildósola took his first overall race win during the San Felipe 250 sharing driving with Rob MacCachren becoming the first Mexico national team to win a SCORE International race. In the Baja 1000 that year, Vildósola and MacCachren shared the wheel, again finishing third in the trophy truck class.

In the 2004 Baja 1000, Vildósola finished sixth in the trophy truck class timing 17:56.13 (56.65 mph).

During the 40th Baja 1000 in 2007, Vildósola and his son Tavo Vildósola finished second place making it, at the time, the best finish position ever achieved by a Mexico national team in the Baja 1000, This achievement was only surpassed by Vildosola Racing itself on 2010 winning the overall on the 43rd edition of the premiere off-road desert race.

Vildósola won the overall in the 43rd edition of the Tecate Score Baja 1000 making him, alongside his son Tavo Vildósola the first Mexican national to win the Baja 1000 overall. His Trophy Truck #21 of team Vildosola Racing raced to the finish line in 19:00.04. Since 1973, the 4-wheel vehicles had not won the overall time over the motorcycles.

The 2011 season started with Vildosola Racing taking third place overall on the 2011 SCORE Laughlin Desert Challenge with a final time of 1:56:37 (51.45 mph)

Gus participated in the CODE Off-Road Casas Geo Grand Prix in 2011 where he raced a Class 11 bug. Gus and team finished third with a time of 3:26.14 and 33.17 mph (53.38 km/h) during the special race which had the peculiarity of having Trophy Truck drivers driving as guests of the Class 11 teams.

After a good start on the 2011 San Felipe 250, Tavo and Gus were leading the race until on race mile 90 the trophy truck had a broken transmission which took Vildósola's crew nearly an hour to fix. The team finished 13th with a time of 5:03.57.

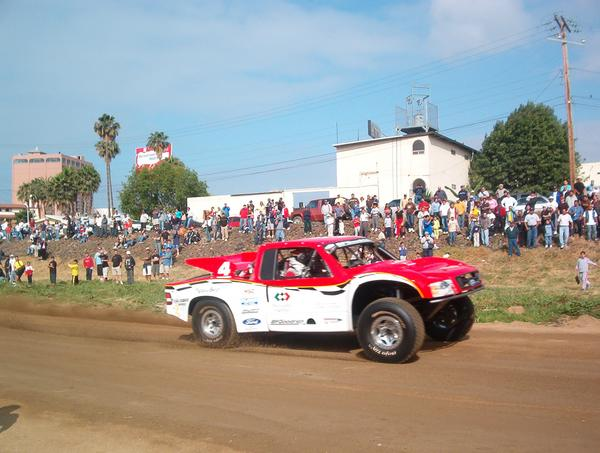
Gustavo Vildósola Sr aka "GVR" driving his Trophy Truck during the 2005 Baja 500

Vildosola Racing presented a new Trophy Truck for the 2012 Tecate SCORE Baja 500. The new Trophy Truck was built by Dave Clark and Vildosola Racing, its lighter and narrower than the old truck and also was built to use 42" wheels. The team started 22nd and was able to pass several drivers after a transmission failure left them out of the race while running 6th.

For the 2012 Baja 1000, Tavo and Gus had a 28th starting position draw, (started 25th after a few withdrawals) which would make things harder for them as they would have a lot of dust and trucks before them. Around race mile 1000, Vildósola had passed all of his competitors and for the second time in a row on a peninsula run won the Baja 1000 overall, beating the motorcycles again, only the second time this happens since 1973, the previous time been in 2010 when Vildósola won the overall. The father and son duo stopped the clocks at 19:45:00 (56.79 mph) and made history again, being the only Mexico national team to have two Baja 1000 titles as the overall winners of the race. Gus drove from race mile 618 to 785 leaving the rest of the driving duties to his son Tavo but managing all of the logistics and pit crews.

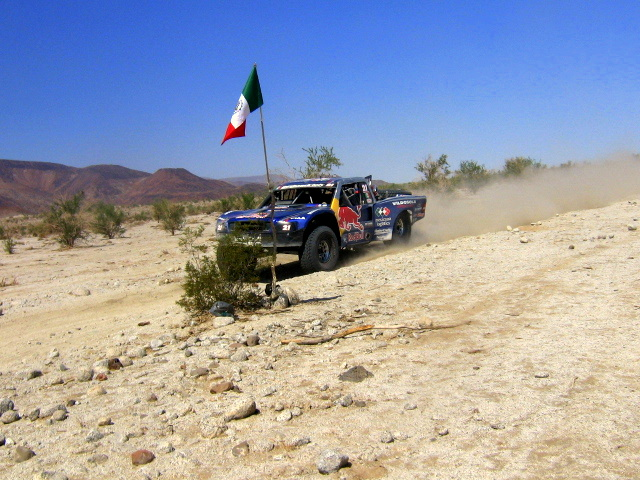
Vildosola Racing SCORE Trophy Truck during the 2011 CODE Off Road Mexicana Logistics 300

Five days after the 2012 Baja 1000, a protest was filed against Vildósola from the BJ Baldwin team which accused Vildósola of having made an illegal pit on the highway. The protest was accepted by SCORE International against their own rules, since protests cannot be filed after 24 hours of the unofficial results being made public. SCORE penalized Vildósola by 90 minutes, demoting him to eighth place overall and stripping him from the race win.

The 2013 San Felipe 250 was won by Vildósola who finished second only three seconds behind Bryce Menzies, but Menzies had failed to cross a Virtual Check Point which cost him a 5-minute penalty giving Vildósola his second overall win on the San Felipe 250.

== Best results ==
Year	Series	Race	Finish	Class
1996	SCORE International	San Felipe 250	1st	ProTruck
2000	SCORE International	Baja 2000	5th	Class 1
2003	SCORE International	San Felipe 250	1st	SCORE Trophy Truck
2003	SCORE International	Baja 1000	3rd	SCORE Trophy Truck
2004	SCORE International	Baja 1000	6th	SCORE Trophy Truck
2007	SCORE International	Baja 500	9th	SCORE Trophy Truck
2007	SCORE International	Baja 1000	2nd	SCORE Trophy Truck
2009	CODE Off-Road	Race Ready 275	1st	SCORE Trophy Truck
2009	SCORE International	Baja 1000	4th	SCORE Trophy Truck
2010	Best In The Desert	Vegas to Reno	5th	SCORE Trophy Truck
2010	NORRA	Mexican 1000 Rally	1st	Class 12
2010	CODE Off-Road	Mexicana Logistics 300	1st	SCORE Trophy Truck
2010	SCORE International	Baja 1000	1st	SCORE Trophy Truck
2011	SCORE International	SCORE Laughlin Desert Challenge	3rd	SCORE Trophy Truck
2011	CODE Off-Road	Casas Geo Grand Prix	3rd	Class 11
2012	CODE Off-Road	Mexicana Logistics 300	4th	SCORE Trophy Truck
2012	SCORE International	Baja 1000	8th	SCORE Trophy Truck
2013	SCORE International	San Felipe 250	1st	SCORE Trophy Truck

== Vildosola Racing ==
Gus Vildósola founded the Vildosola Racing team in 1968. Today, the team races two Trophy Trucks and two Pre-runners and several chase trucks.

== Personal life ==
Vildósola is the CEO, founder and owner of Mexicana Logistics.

On June 8, 2012, Vildósola was awarded the 2012 Distinguished Executive award by the Asociación de Ejecutivos de Ventas y Mercadotecnica de Mexicali, an award that his late father and grandfather had also been awarded.

He is the father of the off-road racer Tavo Vildósola
