= Steve Olliges =

Steve Olliges is an American off-road racer from Las Vegas, Nevada. He has over 30 class wins and 7 championship titles to his credit in the SCORE International and Best in the Desert racing series. Olliges continues to reside in Las Vegas, Nevada, with his wife and their two children.

== Childhood ==
Growing up in Nevada, Olliges realized his passion for the desert and off-road racing at an early age. His parents, Ed and Patty Olliges, are the owners of Friendly Ford in Las Vegas. With the combination of desert terrain and Blue Oval loyalty it was only natural that Steve would gravitate towards a sport that combined his automotive heritage with the landscape of his hometown.

At eleven years old, Olliges was invited to attend the legendary Mint 400 race by the late Gordon Grimus, author of The Off-Road Racer. The exciting experience kick-started Olliges’ lifelong passion for desert racing.

After graduating high school in 1981, Olliges went on to attend UNLV, where he majored in Sports and Fitness Management and minored in Education. Before his 21st birthday, he entered a Ford Bronco (owned by Hal Sealund of KbarS bronco's) in the Mint 400 race. Although Olliges did not finish the race, the experience stayed with him and off-road racing would become an important aspect of his future.

== Business ==
Moving to the San Diego area after college, Olliges temporarily put his love of desert racing on hold while he gained valuable experience working at El Cajon Ford in Southern California. After three years, Olliges moved back to Nevada and worked his way through the ranks of his family's Ford dealership.

The turn of the millennium proved to be the beginning of a new era both personally and professionally. Olliges opened Team Ford in Las Vegas, which quickly developed a loyal following of racer support. With the help of the off-road community, Team Ford is the number one volume dealer in Nevada. As a product of this success, Olliges added the Lincoln and Mercury franchises to Team Ford in 2009.

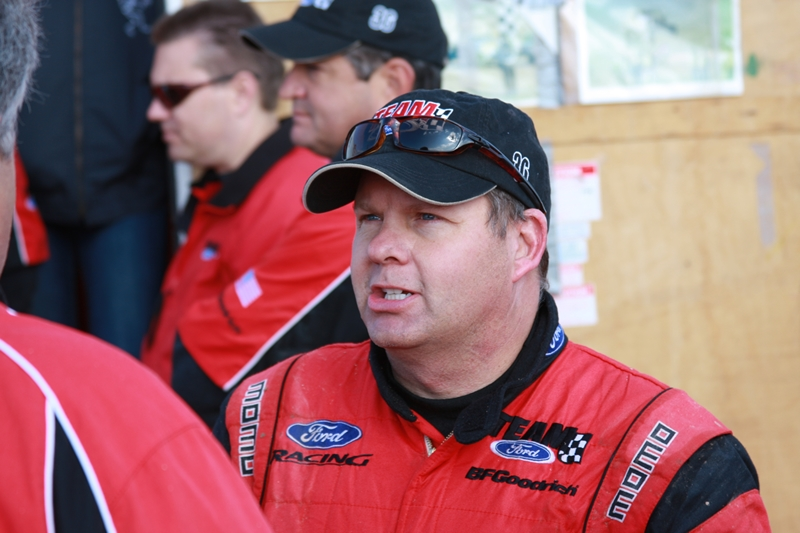
Steve preparing for a desert race.

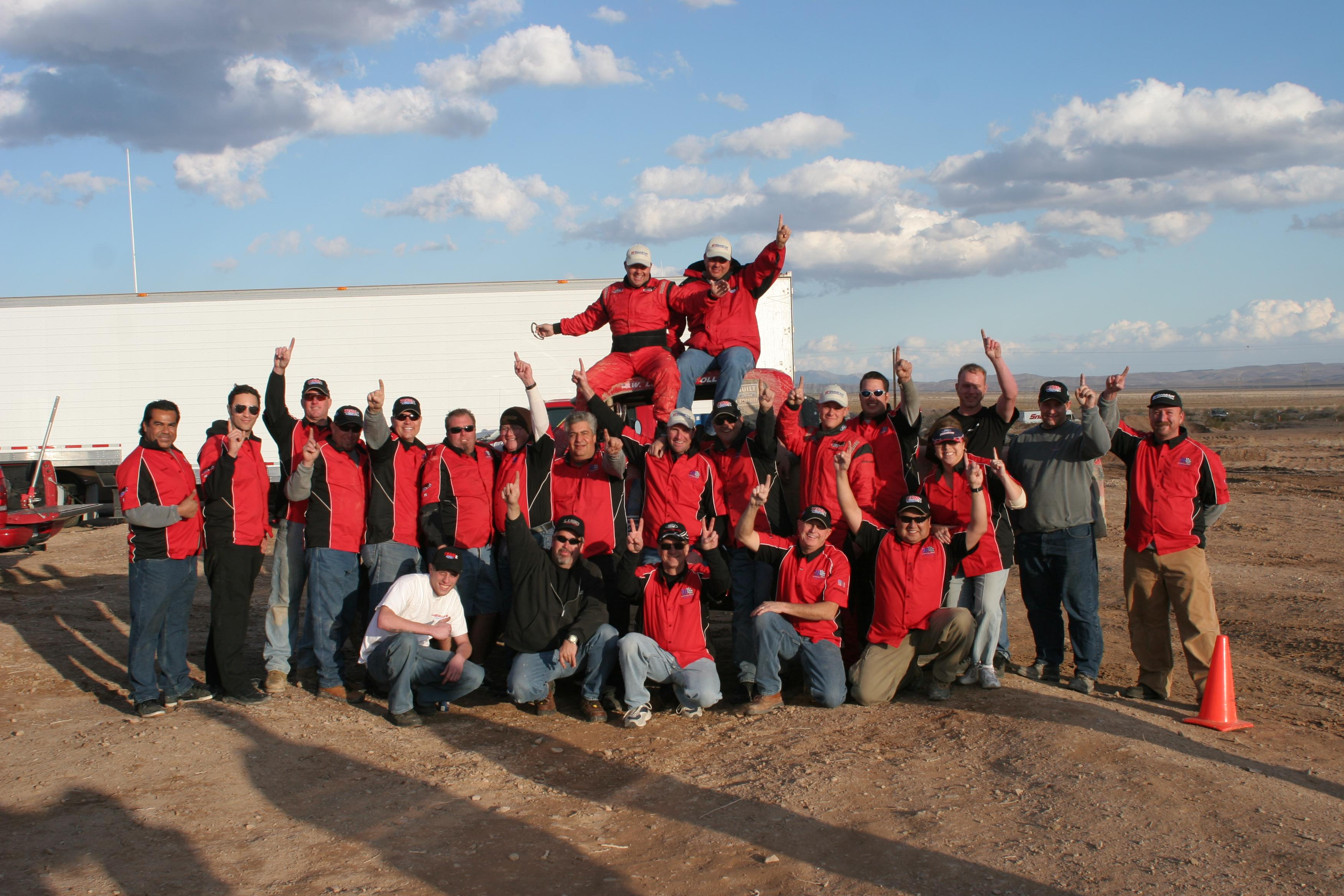
Team Ford Trophy Truck Support Team.

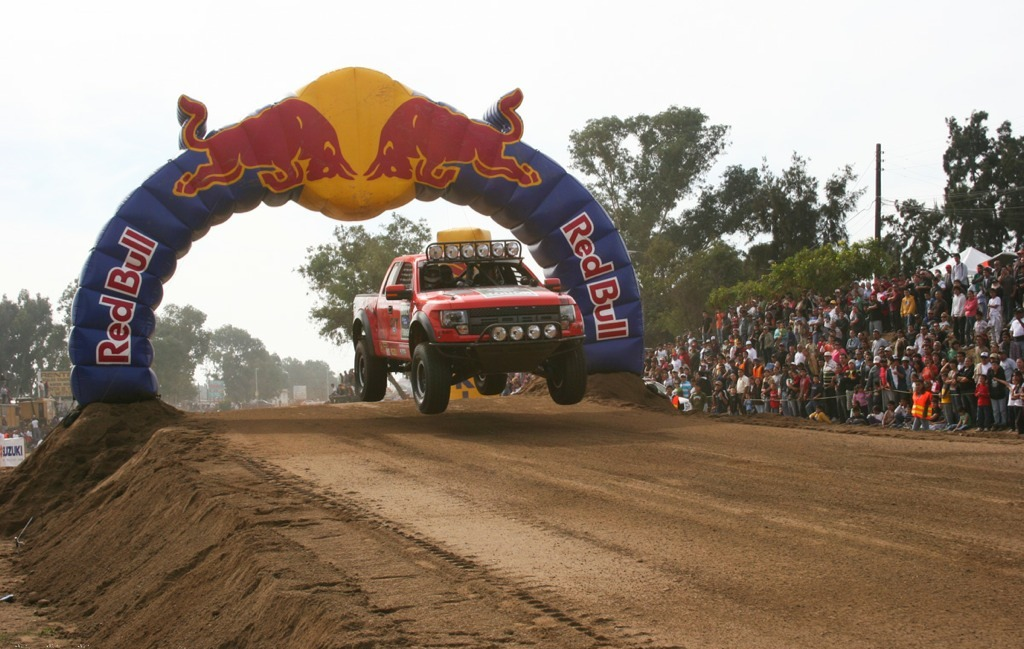
Racing the Ford Raptor.

== Racing career ==
The family business kept Olliges very busy, but he never lost his appetite for motorsports. In 1994 Olliges won the SCORE International series championship in his Ford Lightning F-150 and was also invited to join the Rough Riders with Ford racers such as Rob MacCachren and Scott Taylor.

In 2000, Olliges partnered up with Rob MacCachren again to win the Best in the Desert Series championship in a class 7S Ford Ranger Edge. What began as a one-year agreement to race Ford's newly launched Ranger evolved into a five-year partnership culminating in three championship titles.

With the launch of the Ford F-150 SVT Raptor race program at the 2008 Baja 1000, life has come full circle. Staying loyal to Ford through their entire racing careers, Steve Olliges and Rob MacCachren once again teamed up as the drivers of record for the Raptor race program for the entire 2009 Best in the Desert Series.

For 2011, Olliges joined forces with fellow Ford Rough Rider John Swift to compete in Best In The Desert's premiere Trick Truck class for the entire BITD season and select SNORE events. They won the SNORE Battle at Primm and finished third in BITD for the season in their No. 28 Geiser-built Ford Trick Truck with the distinctive retro paint job. History runs deep with the team, as the No. 28 was used by John Swift on his Rough Rider Ford Ranger in years past. For 2012 Olliges and Swift finished fifth in BITD's Trick Truck class, finishing every mile of every race and posting the sixth fastest average speed across all classes.
