= Justin Peck (off-road racer) =

American professional driver

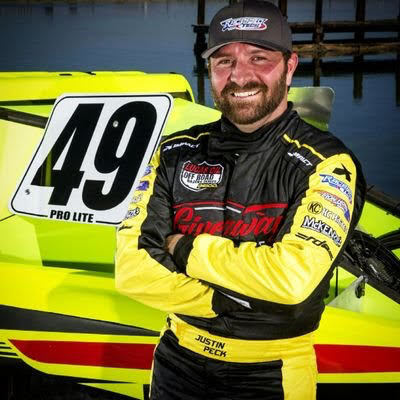
- Born: Salt Lake City, Utah, U.S.
- Occupations: Professional Lucas Oil Pro 2 off-road driver, business owner, motivational speaker, author
- Website: https://www.justinpeck.com

Justin Peck is a professional driver in the Best in the Desert series and the Lucas Oil Off Road Racing Series driver, owner of RacePro Technologies race team, author, competitive bodybuilder, mental health advocate, speaker, and founder of Gear 49, a motorsports nutrition company.

== Early life ==
Peck knew he wanted to become a racer when he was 17 years-old while at a track race with his father. He later bought his first motorcycle at the same age. Peck became a father at 18, and he competed in his first race at 20. Peck was diagnosed with bipolar disorder at the age of 26, a condition he has had since he was 13 years old. Peck has claimed to suffer from depression since the age of nine.

== Racing career ==
Peck has over 27 years of racing experience. He is the back-to-back series champion in off-road motorcycles, a USRA series champion, national winner and third overall winner of The Challenge of America Series, a UKC multi-time series champion, and the only pro off-road driver in the state of Utah.

Throughout his racing career, Peck claims to have broken 84 bones, required 19 surgeries, and had 200 screws surgically inserted into his body. He has also gone on record saying that he's died twice.

=== RacePro Technologies ===
Peck is the founder of RacePro Technologies, an off-road racing team that competes in the Lucas Oil Off Road Series. The team currently runs three professional race cars, five regional race cars, and one national junior race car.

=== Gear49 Nutrition ===
Peck is also the founder of Gear49 Nutrition, a nutritional supplement company that creates products for bodybuilders and racers. The company name is derived from Peck's father, who drove a truck for a living. His handle was "Number Nine." After his father died from cancer, Peck has said that he races "for number nine" and now drives under the number 49.

=== United States Motorsport Association ===
Peck also founded the United States Motorsport Association along with several construction companies and two investment companies.

== Mental illness ==
Peck has stated that he has suffered from depression since he was nine years-old and experienced his first panic attack at 13. Also at 13, Peck claims he became bipolar, although he was not officially diagnosed with the disorder until 2005 after a suicide attempt. He was diagnosed Class 1, indicating episodes that last six months to two years in either phase.

== Memoir ==
Peck is the author of "Bulletproof," a memoir that discusses his battle with mental illness and bipolar disorder. The title is inspired by Peck's failed attempt to shoot himself during a depressive episode when his gun malfunctioned. The gun did not fire, and from then on, Peck considered himself "bulletproof." According to Peck, he keeps the misfired bullet in his nightstand as a reminder of his struggles.

== Philanthropy ==
Peck is active in mental health advocacy by speaking about his battle with bipolar disorder at universities, schools, and corporate events and contributing regularly to organizations that aid in bipolar education.

== Personal life ==
Peck has four children whom he credits with keeping him stable through his mental health challenges. He has also struggled with gambling and substance abuse.
