= Jeepspeed =

Jeepspeed is an off-road organization and class of racing vehicle. The Jeepspeed organization was founded by Mike Barnett and Clive Skilton in 2001 after Clive's visit to the Dakar Rally in Africa with his son and multi-time Dakar Rally competitor, Darren Skilton, with the intent to build a racing vehicle and series around the affordable and durable Jeep. Jeepspeed developed relationships with race promoters like MORE and Best in the Desert to create a five to seven race Jeepspeed racing series each season. The class has since expanded into four divisions and opened up to other Jeep and Dodge vehicles.

== Jeepspeed divisions ==
- Jeepspeed Challenge - Stock Class 1700 - Production Class - is for short wheel base Jeeps with 6 Cylinder and 4 cylinder engines produced since 1984, excluding Pentastar DOHC engines and 2018 Wranglers which must run Jeepspeed Class 2700. Wheel suspension travel limited to 10" front and 12" rear. Maximum width 75.5" measured at outside of tires at widest point. Max tire diameter 33". Dirtnewz.com described it was the largest grassroots racing class in America in 2008.
- Jeepspeed Cup - Intermediate Class 2700 -' is for Jeep and Dodge vehicles that maintain the original appearance and profile. The original bulkhead must be retained together with the original cab floor from bulkhead to rear of driver and passenger seat. Hoods and fenders may be of any material but original appearing radiator grill must be retained. Wheel suspension travel limited to 12" front and 14" rear. Maximum width 87" measured at outside of tires at widest point. Max tire diameter 35"
- Jeepspeed Outlaws - Modified Class 3700' - The Jeepspeed Outlaws is an off road racing championship for Jeep or Dodge sport utility vehicles and light trucks that are recognizable as a Jeep or Dodge by brand grill, hood and fenders. Wheel suspension travel limited to 15" front and 24" rear. Maximum width 93" measured at outside of tires at widest point. Max tire diameter 37"
- Jeepspeed Trophy - Open Class 4700 - Class 4700 has been devised to introduce tube and custom frame Jeeps into the General Tire Desert Race Series presented by KMC Wheels. Jeepspeed Class 4700 vehicles may be combined with Class 3700 until sufficient entries in this new class. Jeepspeed Trophy Open Class 4700 will be identical to Jeepspeed Outlaws Modified Class 3700 but with following exceptions; Wheel base restricted to 119". Front wheel travel 15" max. Rear wheel travel open.

== Notable Jeepspeed teams ==
- Barry Thompson
- Billy Bunch
- Eric Sigwing
- Eric Helgeson
- The Currie Family
- Ray Giffith
- Eric Heiden
- Tom and Mike Barnett
- Chris Nissley
- Dust Junkies
- Filarski Bros
- Bruno Zvirzin
- Nissley Racing Team (Chris, Bill & Tom Nissley)
- Ken and Adam Tichy

== Notable Jeepspeed builds ==
- Xtreme 4x4 Television show aired in 2006 season episode 10 titled "Jeepspeed Build" featuring the construction of a Jeepspeed race vehicle.
- The "10 Day Jeepspeed" by Jason Lafortune and TMR crew.
- ATK Wrangler built by Jon Krellwitz and campaigned in the 3700 class (and SCORE International Class 3).
