= Mint 400 =

Motocross racing event

- Location: Primm, Nevada
- Corporate sponsor: The Mint Las Vegas
- First race: 1968

Circuit information
- Surface: Desert off road race

The Mint 400 is an annual American desert off-road race which takes place near Las Vegas, Nevada. It was resumed in 2008 after a 20-year hiatus.

The race was for both motorcycles, until 1977, and four-wheel vehicles (buggies, cars and trucks) sponsored by Del Webb's Mint Hotel and Casino. Webb, a real estate developer and friend of Howard Hughes, was owner of the Mint Hotel in downtown Las Vegas. It became known as The Great American Desert Race.

== History ==
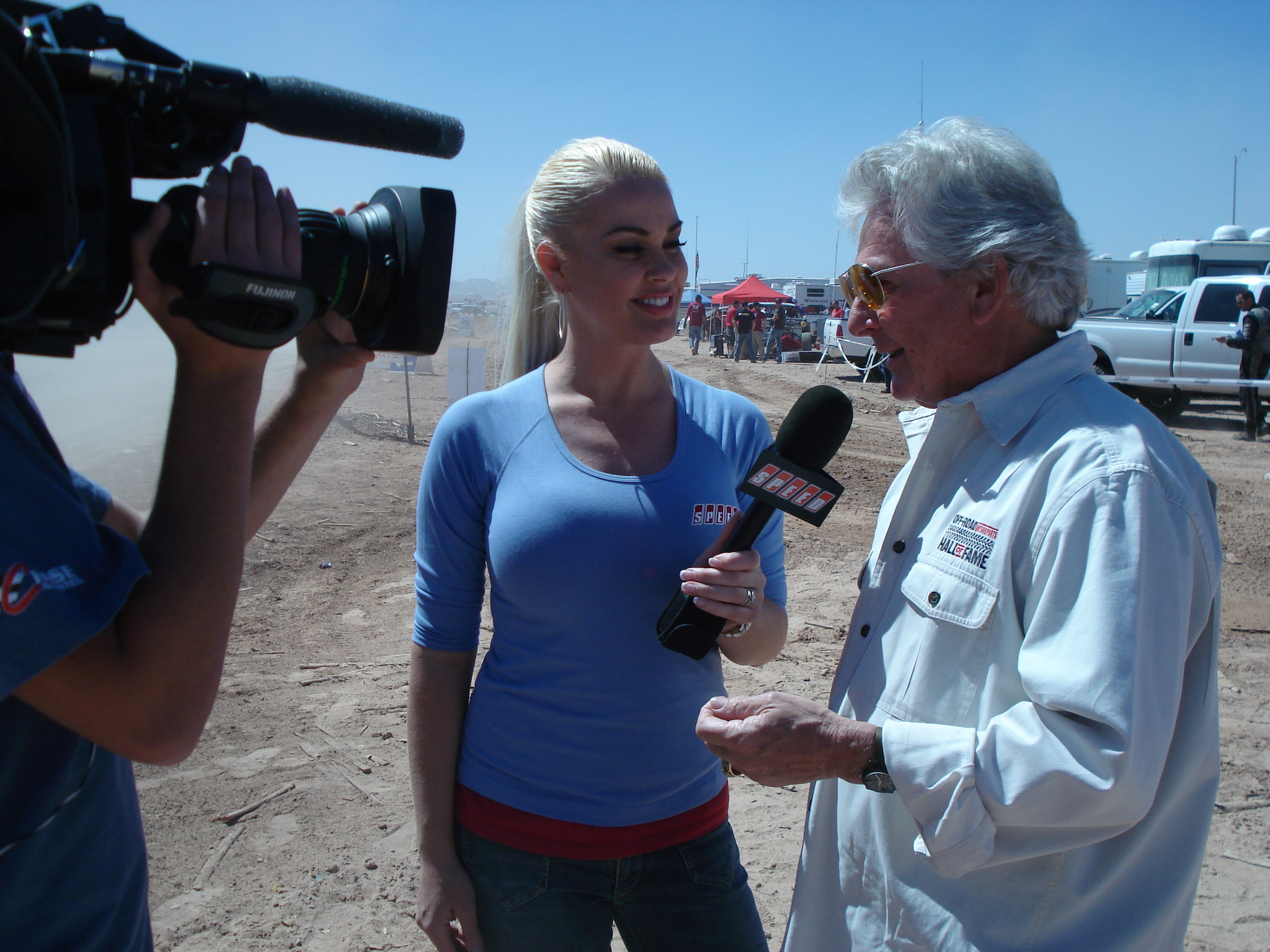
K. J. Howe, former Mint 400 race director, being interviewed by Genevieve Chappell (2009)

Norm Johnson created "The Mint '400' Del Webb Desert Rally" in 1968 in his role as promotions director of The Mint Hotel & Casino. The first race sent 101 vehicles across roughly 400 miles (640 km) of desert, started and ended at The Mint Hotel in Las Vegas with pit-stops at Ash Meadows, Beatty and Lathrop Wells.

The future of the Mint 400 race came into question in 1988 following the sale of Del Webb's Mint Hotel & Casino to Jack Binion, owner of the Horseshoe Club. However, as a testament to the race itself, the prestige and importance of the event created by veteran race director K. J. Howe and the Mint management team and the financial benefit this promotion brought to the City of Las Vegas, under new ownership the annual Mint 400 Off Road Race continued to be run in 1988 and 1989.

New owner Binion felt the race and its ancillary activities along Fremont Street had a negative impact on his casinos. So, the race was no longer held after the 1988 Mint 400.

The Mint was not held for nearly twenty years, then was restarted by long-time sponsor General Tire with help from the Southern Nevada Off-Road Enthusiasts. The race resumed on March 29, 2008. The race was preceded by inspections of the vehicles on Fremont Street in the Fremont East district. SNORE eventually sold the franchise to The Martelli Brothers for the 2011 edition.

In 2012, the Martelli Brothers partnered with off-road industry veteran Casey Folks, owner of the largest off-road desert racing organization in the world, the Best in the Desert Racing Association. The Mint was added to the Best in the Desert championship schedule, and a new 100 mi (160 km) race loop was carved out for the 400 mi (640 km) contest. The number of entries swelled to an astounding three hundred and twenty three race teams, making the Mint 400 one of the largest off-road races in the world.

2012 also saw the introduction of the Method Race Wheels Pit Crew Challenge, an event in which sixteen pit crews from the top unlimited truck teams competed in a head-to-head battle to decide who had the best crew. Each of the three-man teams were given one jack, one impact gun, and one spare tire. The team who completed two tire changes the fastest, advanced to the next round. Over 10,000 spectators on Fremont Street, showed up to cheer on the teams. After several close and heated rounds the General Tire/THR team – which included drivers Mikey Childress, Rick Johnson, and crew member James Walker – out-pitted the field to win.

The Martelli Brothers parted ways with Best in the Desert for the 2020 edition, and created the Unlimited Off-Road Racing series in 2023, which also features the Parker 400 and California 300.

== Winners ==
=== Motorcycle ===
- 1968 J. N. Roberts / Gunnar Lindstrom (Husqvarna) 12:30:32
- 1969 Mike Patrick / Phil Bowers (Yamaha)
- 1970 Mike Patrick / Phil Bowers (Yamaha) 8:53:42
- 1971 J. N. Roberts / Max Switzer (Husqvarna) 9:54:05
- 1972 Rolf Tibblin / Bob Grossi (Husqvarna) 7:16:26
- 1973 Rolf Tibblin / Mitch Mayes (Husqvarna)
- 1974 No race due to 1973 oil crisis
- 1975 Mark Mason / Jack Johnson 7:59
- 1976 Rolf Tibblin / Jack Johnson (Husqvarna)
- 2019 Ricky Brabec / Kendall Norman 4:53:27
- 2022 Dalton Shirey / David Kamo 8:00:21
- 2023 Dalton Shirey 7:34:04.346
- 2024 Preston Campbell 7:37:16.063

=== Overall four-wheel ===
- 1968 Gene Hirst & Al Halz 16:01:32
- 1969 John Johnson & Linda Johnson 12:19:00
- 1970 Drino Miller & Vic Wilson 12:44:34
- 1971 Fritz Kroyer & Bill Harkey 13:30:42
- 1972 Fritz Kroyer & Bill Harkey 8:33:00
- 1973 Parnelli Jones & Bill Stroppe 9:10:00
- 1974 No race due to 1973 oil crisis
- 1975 Gene Hirst & Rick Mears 9:31:46
- 1976 Gene Hirst & Bobby Ferro 10:22:47
- 1977 Malcolm Smith & Bud Feldkamp 9:09.30
- 1978 Malcolm Smith & Bud Feldkamp 8:59.35
- 1979 Bobby Ferro & Glenn Harris 8:34.94
- 1980 Jack Johnson 7:38.37
- 1981 Ron Gardner & Bernie Mayer 8:18:13
- 1982 Jim Temple & Rolf Tibblin 9:32:39
- 1983 Jim Wright & Billy Wright 9:17:52
- 1984 Jim Wright & Billy Wright 9:20:31
- 1985 Jim Temple & Kenny Cox 9:08:16
- 1986 Larry Ragland 8:33:14
- 1987 Steve Sourapas & Dave Richardson 8:50:00
- 1988 Mark McMillin 7:46:16
- 1989 Ivan Stewart 9:34:40
- 1990–1994 Nissan 400
- 1995–2007 No race held
- 2008 Brian Collins & Chuck Hovey 6:36:55
- 2009 Andy McMillin 8:27:35
- 2010 Roger Norman 8:37:29
- 2011 B. J. Baldwin 8:30:37
- 2012 Robby Gordon 6:05:54
- 2013 Bryce Menzies 6:19:59
- 2014 Steve Sourapas & Andy McMillin 6:14:29
- 2015 Justin Lofton 5:57:38
- 2016 Justin Lofton 5:36:10
- 2017 Rob MacCachren 5:30:32
- 2018 Bryce Menzies 5:52:03
- 2019 Justin Lofton 5:24:26
- 2020 Luke McMillin & Jason Duncan 6:49:52
- 2021 Rob MacCachren & Cayden MacCachren 6:56:21
- 2022 Kyle Jergensen & Shawn Shanks 6:43:49
- 2023 Eric Hardin & Andrew Myers 6:46.37
- 2024 Adam Householder & Trevor Ellingham 6:46:57
- 2025 Adam Householder & Trevor Ellingham 6:59:06
- 2026 Kyle Jergensen & Shawn Shanks TT Spec 6:47:23

== Car/Truck Classes ==
- Unlimited Truck (4WD) - Four-Wheel Drive Unlimited vehicles with truck or SUV body.
- Unlimited Truck (2WD) - Two-Wheel Drive Unlimited vehicles with truck or SUV body.
- Unlimited Truck Legends - Unlimited vehicles with truck or SUV body. Drivers over the age of 50.
- Class 1 Unlimited - Unlimited Two or Four Wheel Drive Open Wheel Four Wheel Vehicle
- Class 1 - Unlimited open wheel vehicles
- Unlimited Truck SPEC - Unlimited chassis and suspension truck or SUV with limited engine.
- Class 6800 - Unlimited chassis and suspension truck or SUV with limited engine, drive train and tire size.
- Class 1 SPEC / 6200 - Unlimited 4 wheel, single and two seat vehicles. Limited to IRS. No straight axle suspension.
- Class 8 - Limited Full Size truck or SUV
- 4400: Unlimited - Unlimited Ultra4 vehicle.
- Class 7 - Unlimited chassis Mini or Mid size truck or SUV. Maximum six cylinder engine.
- Class 10 - Unlimited open wheel vehicles with limited engine.
- Class 5 Unlimited - Unlimited Baja Bug
- TrophyLite - Purpose built SPEC race truck, 4 cylinder engine, SPEC suspension, parts and bodies.
- Class 3000 - Limited two(2) or three(3) seat mini or mid-sized vehicle. Engine is limited to sealed SPEC.
- Class 12 - Limited Open Wheel Vehicle
- 1/2 1600 - Limited chassis, limited engine open wheel vehicle.
- Jeepspeed Trophy - Identical to Jeepspeed Outlaws but with open class specific exceptions.
- Jeepspeed Outlaws - Jeep or Dodge sport utility vehicles and light trucks with original frame.
- Class 1450 - Open production full sized or mini truck. Must have production steel body.
- Class 2000 - Production mini or full-size truck. Production steel body and doors must be used.
- Class 7S - Limited Mini or Mid size truck or SUV Sportsman
- Jeepspeed Cup - Jeep and Dodge vehicles that maintain the original appearance and profile.
- Jeepspeed Challenge - Short wheel base Jeeps with 6 Cylinder and 4 cylinder engines.
- 5-1600 - Limited Baja Bug
- Modern Vintage - Race cars 1995 and older.
- Vintage Open - Race cars 1989 and older.
- Vintage - Race cars 1982 and older.
- Class 5500 - Zero one rental car program.
- Stock Production Truck Mini/Mid - Stock Production Mini or Mid size truck or SUV.
- Stock Production Truck Full - Stock Production Full size truck or SUV
- Open Sportsman - Unlimited Vehicle Sportsman Class.
- Class 9 Challenger - Single and two seat vehicles with a maximum wheelbase of 100". Vehicle parts are based on a Type I VW.
- Class 11 - Stock Production VW Bug
- EV Production - Stock Production EV Truck/SUV
- EV Open Production - Open Production EV Truck/SUV
- EV Unlimited - Open EV
- Hybrid Production - Stock Production Hybrid Truck/SUV
- Hybrid Open Production - Open Production Hybrid Truck/SUV
- Hybrid Unlimited - Open Hybrid
- Modern Military -
- Vintage Military -
- Hooptie X Modified - Modified Gambler 500/Hooptie X vehicle
- Hooptie X Stock - Stock Gambler 500/Hooptie X vehicle

== Notable entrants ==
Entrants in this event were worldwide and included some well-known names from racing and people from the television and motion picture industry. Indianapolis 500 winners Parnelli Jones, Al Unser, Rick Mears, and Rodger Ward; off-road champions Mickey Thompson, Ivan Stewart, Jack Flannery, Walker Evans; international off-road competitor, Rod Hall; power boat champion Bill Muncey, film and television stars James Garner, Steve McQueen, Larry Wilcox and Patrick Dempsey; comedian Mort Sahl; astronaut Gordon Cooper and rock musician Ted Nugent have competed in the Mint 400. Jay Leno raced with Jerry Zaiden from Camburg Racing, Heavy D & Diesel Dave from the Discovery Channel show. Diesel Brothers competed in the Mint 400 in 2017. Heavy D & Diesel Dave's race in the Mint 400 was featured on the show in the episode from Season 3, "Race Against the Machine". In 2025 WWE wrestler Stone Cold Steve Austin participated in the race as well.

== Mint 400 girls ==
K.J. Howe, Mint Hotel executive and longtime Mint 400 Race Director, conceived "The Girls of the Mint 400" in 1972 to add PR value to the race. Former mint 400 girls include actress Lynda Carter and Wheel of Fortune's Vanna White, while Mint 400 Girls Tracy Vaccaro and Dona Speir were later Playboy centerfolds. The 1981 race included Angela Aames as a Mint 400 girl.

In 2012, the Miss Mint contest was revived.

== In popular culture ==
Hunter S. Thompson's novel Fear and Loathing in Las Vegas depicts the 1971 race in one of the earliest and best known instances of gonzo journalism. The race is also featured in the 1998 film, Fear and Loathing in Las Vegas based on Thompson's book. The 1993 Nissan 400 was featured in the Film Desert Steel.

The Australian alternative rock band Ammonia named their debut album Mint 400 after the desert race as depicted in Fear and Loathing in Las Vegas.

The 2010 and 2011 Mint 400 were featured on Fuel TV, while the 2012 Mint 400 was aired on Speed.
