= Truggy =

Off-road vehicle

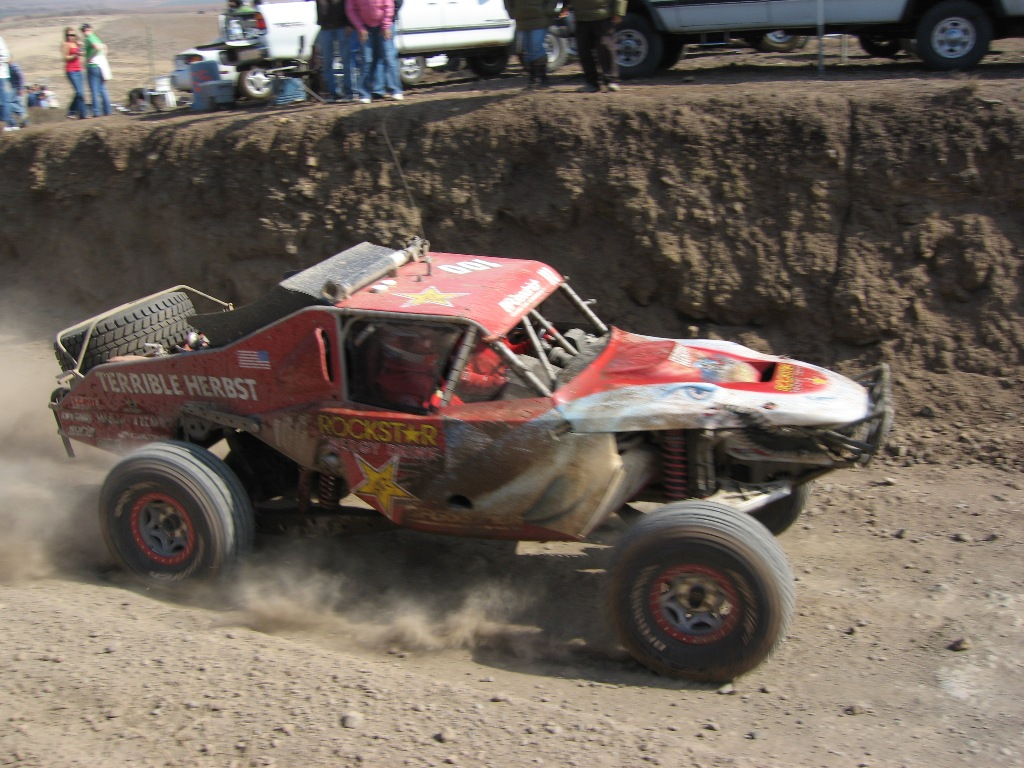
Terrible Herbst Truggy "El Tiburon"

A truggy is a type of high performance off-road racing vehicle that combines features from two older existing categories of off-road racing vehicles, trucks and buggies. The first truggies were built for racing in the SCORE and BITD off-road desert racing series, held in Mexico, California, Nevada and Arizona.

== History ==
Desert off-road racing began in the 1960s in Baja California and expanded over the next 30 years to include dozens of races and several sanctioning organizations. These organizations created a class structure so that while many types of vehicles could race, direct competition could be segmented into groups of similar vehicles. These classes evolved over time, and included classes for near-stock vehicles, as well as "open" classes that permitted unique custom-built vehicles.

One of the most popular and fastest classes in the 1990s was the 'Open Buggy' or 'Unlimited' class, which permitted maximum leeway in designing a vehicle. Most buggies of the era remained loosely based on the architecture of the original VW Beetle automobile, with a rear engine, an independent rear transaxle suspension, and relatively shorter wheelbase. The "open" or "unlimited" buggy classes became the home to extremely high performance vehicles. These "Class 1 unlimited" buggies soon did away with the entire production Volkswagen chassis and sheet metal, and instead used a full tube chassis. In almost all cases they continued to use the rear-engine / transaxle architecture of the VW, replacing the iconic Volkswagen's air cooled 4-cylinder boxer engine with larger and more powerful engines from a variety of manufacturers, especially the related Porsche motors. Transaxle strength was often a limiting factor of these designs, while their greatest attributes included their light weight, extreme wheel travel, strength and overall custom built suitability to the task of racing at high speeds on harsh desert roads.

Another groups of classes that had increasing popularity throughout the 1990s were the various truck based classes, for both mini and full-sized trucks. These truck classes were popular as they reflected more closely the vehicles bought by average American and Mexican consumers for use off-road, as they were based on modified production trucks of the era. The fastest truck classes evolved over time from one with limited modifications to a more open class rules, that permitted massive changes to many aspects of the vehicle, but still generally required using the stock frame and some of the body from a production vehicle. These high-end trucks were both very fast and very reliable. Their greatest attributes included extremely large and powerful front-mounted V8 engines, larger wheels and tires to absorb rough terrain, extremely rugged rear truck axles, and increasingly long travel suspension.

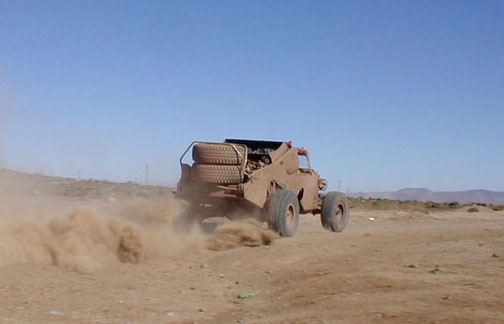
Truggy racing the Baja 1000

In 1994 SCORE decided to run the Parker 400 off-road race over two days. Day one would see the new class of Trophy Trucks run on the course, and day two would see all other classes race over the same course. Jim Smith, owner of Ultra Custom Wheels entered his Mike Smith built Trophy Truck and also entered a Class One car into the race. However the Class One car, was in fact his Trophy Truck without its body, but with its interior aluminium panels painted black. Jim and his crew called it a truggy and the name took hold.

In 1995 the team Terrible Herbst Motorsports decided to build an unlimited Class 1 buggy that used the basic front engine, rear solid axle architecture of a truck. This vehicle, which was designed and fabricated by Mike Smith Fabrication. it was built like an unlimited buggy, with a full custom triangulated tubular chrome-moly chassis, but with the truck-like layout of big American V-8 motor in front of the driver, and a very strong truck-style rear axle and large 37" Trophy truck sized wheels and tires on all corners.

The combination in many ways combined the best characteristics of each of the two donor types: the lower weight, higher strength chassis, and extremely large suspension travel of the buggies, with the massive horsepower and stronger rear end design of the top trucks.

The Terrible Herbst Truggy was given the name "El Tiburon" and "The Landshark", in part due to the paint scheme originally applied to the all-fiberglass custom body of the vehicle. It dominated class one for many years after its introduction, winning back-to-back SCORE Class 1 titles in 1997 and 1998, as well as the overall (all classes) points championship in 1998. It continued to be the most dominant vehicle in the sport for nearly a decade, winning first and second place repeatedly in both class and overall categories in both the SCORE and the BITD series.

As a result of this domination the truggy format became popular with other builders and the term became the generic term from a specially built off-road vehicle that uses truck architecture (front engine, solid rear axle) but unlimited buggy style construction (tube chassis, no production parts retained). The format also became popular with the newer disciplines of closed-course stadium off-road racing, and extreme rock-crawling, where 4-wheel drive versions were created.

== See also ==
- SCORE Class 1
- Trophy truck
