= Larry Janesky =

American businessman (born 1964)

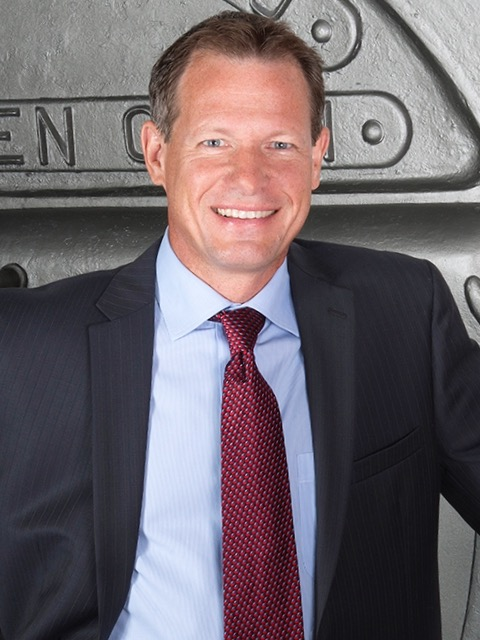
- Janesky in 2015
- Born: Lawrence Janesky; August 25, 1964 (age 61); Bridgeport, Connecticut, U.S.
- Occupations: Founder & CEO of Basement Systems Inc.

Lawrence Janesky (born August 25, 1964) is an American businessman, entrepreneur, author and trainer. Janesky is the founder and CEO of Contractor Nation & Basement Systems Inc. He is the co-founder of Total Basement Finishing, Inc., Supportworks, Inc., Dr. Energy Saver, Inc., and Klaus Roofing Systems. Janesky began his local basement waterproofing company (Connecticut Basement Systems) in 1987, serving homeowners in the Fairfield, New Haven, and New London, CT counties. CTBS has been in business for over 35 years and now serves all of CT's Counties and Westchester, NY.

In his early years, Janesky pursued multiple opportunities to improve the basement waterproofing industry, with specific regard to its products & processes. Moisture build-up in a homes basement can be the catalyst for a multitude of other issues, including; cracked or crumbling foundations, mold growth, poor air quality in the home, and more. This inspired Janesky to continue to grow his business model, and launch the Basement Systems Network. This private network consists of 100s of local home improvement businesses across the US & Canada. In-network contractors have access to proprietary products, trainings, and resources. The public facing name of all of Larry's businesses is Contractor Nation. Many people still refer to Janesky as, "the All Things Basementy guy".

Janesky is an avid motocross racer, frequently competing in the Baja 1000. He is also an Eagle Scout in the Boy Scouts of America.

== Career ==
Larry Janesky was born in Bridgeport, Connecticut in 1964. Active in boy scouts, he earned the Eagle Scout rank at age 14. He graduated high school at age 17 in 1982 from Bullard-Havens Technical High School located in Bridgeport, CT. He did not go to college but immediately began his career as a self-employed carpenter remodeling and building homes. He was contracted to build a 3,000 square foot house at age 18 and was spec building by age 20.

In 1987 he started his own company providing basement waterproofing and radon mitigation services, calling it Connecticut Basement Systems. Janesky invented and developed a line of waterproofing products of which he was the exclusive installer. He acquired patents on his waterproofing products and currently holds 31 patents.

In 1990, Janesky began creating a network of basement waterproofing contractors naming it Basement Systems, Inc. The contractors were made the exclusive dealers and installers in their area of the patented waterproofing products. Currently, there are over 220 dealers in the Basement System Dealer Network.

== Other companies ==
Janesky also launched the following companies:

- CleanSpace (1999)
- Treehouse Marketing (2005)
- Total Basement Finishing, Inc. (2006)
- Supportworks, Inc. (2008) Janesky sold his interest in 2016.
- Dr. Energy Saver, Inc. (2009)
- The Contractor Nation School of Entrepreneurship (2016)

Larry also made a partnership investment in The Junkluggers.

In 2019, Janesky's Contractor Nation purchased Master Systems Inc., headquartered in Knoxville, Tennessee.

In 2019, Janesky partnered with Klaus Roofing Systems to launch Klaus Roofing Systems Network.

== Recognition & awards ==
In 2012, Janesky was awarded the Connecticut Small Business Person of the Year

In 2015, Janesky received the National Eagle Scout Association's Outstanding Eagle Scout Award.

In 2015, Janesky won the Ernst & Young Entrepreneur of the Year Award.

Janesky has also appeared on the Bob Vila Show and the Ron Hazelton Show.

== Motocross ==
Janesky is a motocross rider, winning in the Sportsman Class of the Baja 1000 in 2015.

Janesky and his son Tanner Janesky are the only Father/Son duo to complete both the Baja 500 and the Baja 1000.

In 2017, Janesky starred in a self-made Documentary “Into The Dust” about the 2015 Race. Janesky and his son Tanner would go on to compete in multiple Baja 1000 annually. Janesky released “Into The Dust 2” in 2020.

In 2018, Janesky became the oldest participant to finish the Baja 1000 solo on a motorcycle, and one of less than 25 riders ever to do so at the time. It took him 34 hours.

In 2018, Janesky took 2nd place in Pro Moto Ironman Class Championship during the Baja 1000.

In 2020 he finished the Baja 1000 in 53 hours but was over the time limit so was not an official finisher. Two weeks later he had his right knee replaced. Unable to train for long distances on a motorcycle as he used to, he switched to racing on four wheels in a UTV.

In 2023 he finished second in the Baja 500. He then won the Baja 1000 in November 2024, in the Pro UTV N/A class. The race was 1311 miles.

Larry is one of only a handful of racers who have finished the longest non-stop race in the world, the Baja 1000, on two wheels and four wheels.

In 2024 Larry entered the San Felipe 250 solo on a motorcycle in the 50 and over class and finished second.

Chris Haines is Larry's race support director.

== Bibliography ==
Janesky is the author or co-author of multiple books which include:

- 2005: Dry Basement Science ISBN 0-9776457-1-1
- 2008: Basement Finishing Science ISBN 978-0-9776457-3-2
- 2009: Home Comfort Science ISBN 9780-9776457-6-3
- 2009: Saving Energy at Home ISBN 978-0-9776457-6-3
  - Co-authors: Tim Snyder, Tom Casey
- 2010: The Highest Calling ISBN 9781497653368
  - 2010 Grand Champion, Small Business Trends Business Book Awards
  - 2010 Best Business Book, New England Book Festival
  - 2011 Best Business Book, Indie Book Awards
- 2010: Foundation Repair Science ISBN 978-0-9776457-7-0
  - Co-authors: David Thrasher, Amanda Harrington
- 2012: Crawl Space Science ISBN 978-0977645725
- 2013 Mold Prevention Science ISBN 978-0-9776457-9-4
  - Co-author: Clint S. Cooper
- 2019: Iron Sharpens Iron: Challenge of a Lifetime
