= Baja 1000 =

Off-road race on Mexico's Baja California Peninsula

Coordinates: 31°52′05″N 116°38′01″W

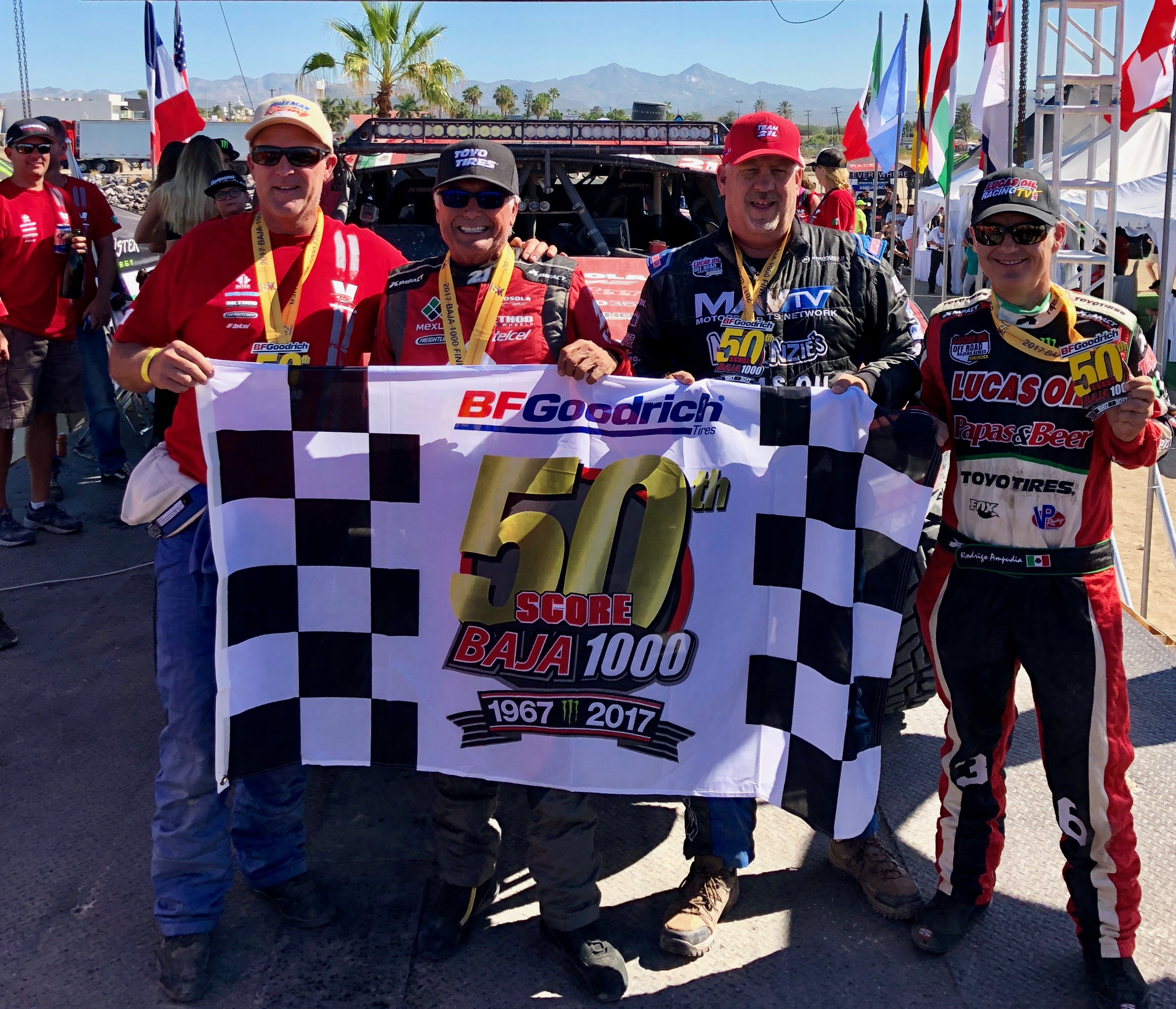
Team 12L, winner of the Trophy Truck Legend class in 2017: Mike Coleman, Gus Vildósola, Scott Bailey, and Rodrigo Ampudia

The Baja 1000 is an annual Mexican off-road motorsport race held on the Baja California Peninsula, with a course of up to about 850 or more miles. It is one of the most prestigious off-road races in the world, having attracted competitors from six continents. The race was founded by Ed Pearlman in 1967 and is sanctioned by SCORE International. The race is the final round of a four-race annual series, which also includes the San Felipe 250, the Baja 400 and the Baja 500. The 2017 Baja 1000 marked the 50th anniversary of the race.

The Baja 1000 has various types of classes, including Trophy trucks, Dirtbikes, Truggys, Side-by-sides, Baja Bugs and Buggies, all competing at the same time on the same course. The course has remained relatively the same over the years, with about every other event being either a point-to-point race from Ensenada to La Paz or a loop race starting and finishing in Ensenada. The name of the event can be misleading, as the mileage varies for the type of event. A "Loop" can be 600 to 850 miles starting and finishing in Ensenada or "Point to Point", also known as the 900.

Competitors face many challenges, including sudden terrain drops, cliffs, boulders, traction disruptors, mud, dunes, visibility issues, dust, fog, mirages, dark road traffic, spectators, cattle, and local wildlife.

== Race history ==
=== 1962: The first timed run ===
When Jack McCormack and Walt Fulton of Honda's American subsidiary decided to hold a long-distance run to prove the reliability of the new Honda CL72 Scrambler motorcycle, they approached well-known off-road motorcycle racer and local Triumph and Honda dealer Bud Ekins for suggestions. Ekins suggested the Tijuana to La Paz route (Federal Highway 1), which was 950 miles (1,530 km) of rocks, sand washes, dry lake beds, cattle crossings, and mountain passes, with few paved roads. Ekins declined to undertake the run because of his professional association with Triumph but suggested that his brother Dave Ekins and the son of another Southern California Honda distributor, Billy Robertson Jr., could accomplish the trip for American Honda.

After performing an aerial pre-run over the peninsula in Fulton's Cessna 180, Ekins and Robertson began the journey to La Paz just after midnight on March 22, 1962. While being followed by two journalists in an airplane and using telegraph offices at the Mexican border and in La Paz, Dave Ekins recorded the first official timed run in 39 hours 56 minutes (39:56), with a total distance of 952.7 miles (1,533.2 km). The event received coverage in the Globe, Argosy, and Cycle World magazines, earning awe and respect for Honda and the Baja run. The Globe and Argosy accounts also included close encounters with death and other dangers, which Ekins claims were "colorful additions".

=== Four wheels vs two wheels ===
Wanting to beat the existing motorcycle record and to help fuel sales of the Meyers Manx, Bruce Meyers used his original prototype buggy called "Old Red" for an attempt at breaking the record set by Ekins. After pre-running a course south to La Paz, Ted Mangels and Bruce Meyers started the record-breaking attempt back to Tijuana from La Paz at 10:00 pm on April 19, 1967. With a journalist from Road & Track magazine following the two to witness the attempt, the final official time was 34:45, beating Ekins' run by more than five hours. Upon returning to the United States, the journalist documenting the run sent out press kits with photographs and a news release with the headline "Buggy Beats Bike in Baja" to hundreds of magazines and newspapers. Soon, more stories of adventure, close calls, and broken speed records received media coverage around the world. Following the event, Bruce Meyers and his Meyers Manx became an overnight sensation, and the competition between four wheels and motorcycles for the fastest Baja run began.

In the following months, more attempts at breaking the record would take place. One of the attempts included a multiple vehicle run organized by Ed Pearlman that ended in an official four wheel record being recorded but with the overall time falling short of the record set by Meyers. On July 4, 1967, an American Motors Rambler American sedan would leave Tijuana at 9:00 am to successfully break the record set by Meyers with an overall time of 31 hours.

=== 1967: The Mexican 1000 ===
As the timed runs recorded via telegraph became popular, a need for an organized event to compete for the quickest Baja run was starting to grab the attention of other competitors. In response to Meyers' record setting run, Ed Pearlman convinced Dick Cepek, Claude Dozier, Ed Orr, Drino Miller and journalist John Lawlor to make the run to La Paz. In June 1967, Pearlman and group left Tijuana and immediately ran into mechanical troubles. This trip inspired Pearlman to organize an off-road race down the Baja peninsula by creating the National Off-Road Racing Association (NORRA). After Pete Condos and Pearlman put up the funds to incorporate NORRA, the group announced an official recognition of the previous record setters and created classes that related to the type of vehicle used to break the record. During the later part of summer, NORRA named the event the "Mexican 1000 Rally" and announced the first official race from Tijuana to La Paz was to be held on the peninsula.

The first official race started in Tijuana, Baja California, on October 31, 1967, and was named the NORRA Mexican 1000 Rally. The course length that year was 849 miles (1,366 km) and ended in La Paz, with the overall winning time of 27 hours 38 minutes (27:38) set by Vic Wilson and Ted Mangels while driving a Meyers Manx buggy. From 1967 to 1972, the race was organized by NORRA and grew in popularity, with ABC's "Wide World of Sports" sending Jim McKay to cover the 1968 event. It attracted new participants like the late Mickey Thompson, Indy 500 winner Parnelli Jones, movie actor James Garner, and Mary McGee, the first woman to compete in the event. By 1971, major sponsors such as Olympia Brewing Company and Minolta Cameras began to support Parnelli Jones in his Dick Russell-designed and Bill Stroppe-prepared "Big Oly" Bronco and Larry Minor in a similar Stroppe-prepared Bronco.

=== 1973 oil crisis and SCORE ===
In October 1973, the price for a barrel of crude oil shot up 70% overnight as the Organization of Petroleum Exporting Countries (OPEC) launched the Arab Oil Embargo. With fear that competitors would abandon the idea of competing and stay home, NORRA cancelled the 1974 Baja race–despite assurances from the Federal government run Petroleos Mexicanos (Pemex) that fuel prices would remain stable–and announced they would instead hold an event in the state of Arizona.

It was at that time in history that Baja California governor Milton Castellanos handed over sanctioning of the event to a non-profit Mexican corporation called the "Baja Sports Committee" (BSC). BSC renamed the event the "Baja Mil" (Baja 1000) and scheduled the race to run on the original dates chosen by NORRA. Though NORRA held a competing event in the United States that same weekend, BSC successfully ran the race from Ensenada to La Paz as in years prior. Unaware of the challenges, BSC found promoting Baja races more difficult than anticipated.

Instead of giving up the race, the Mexican government requested help from SCORE International in hosting and promoting future Baja races. Through negotiations with Mickey Thompson and his SCORE organization, the Government agreed to give exclusive rights to SCORE to hold Baja races and also reluctantly allowed SCORE to cancel the event for 1974 (a year where motorsport was curtailed in the United States because of the oil crisis). SCORE hired Sal Fish as president and took control of the Baja 1000 from that year on with the Baja 1000 race resuming under new control in 1975.

The 1979 race was notable for Walker Evans’ overall win in a Dodge truck, the first truck to win the overall title of the race. In 2012, the racing organization was purchased by Roger Norman and continues to run under his presidency.

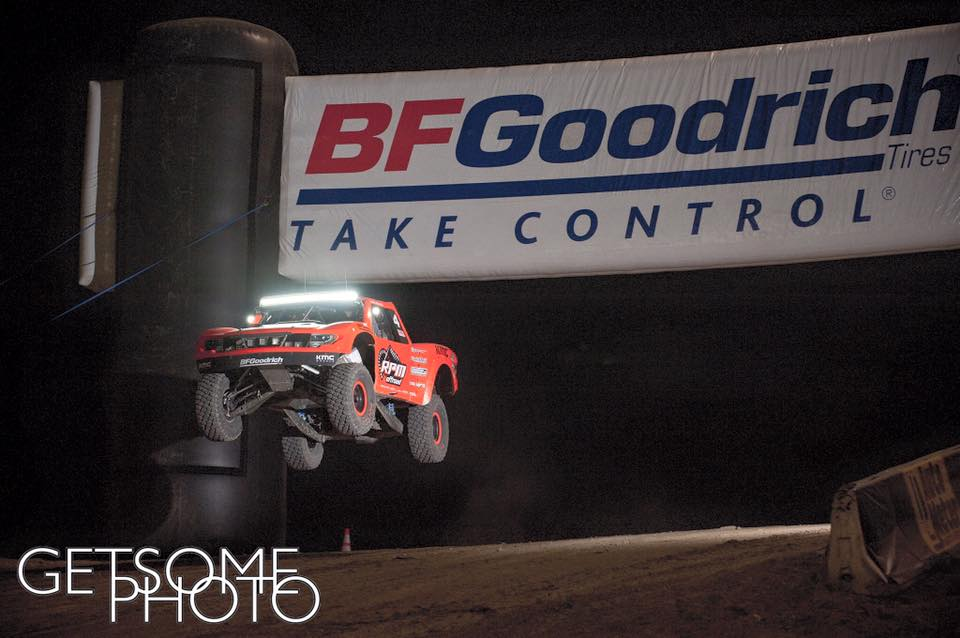
RPM Trophy Truck at the 2015 Baja 1000 qualifying

== Vehicles ==
The Baja 1000 is open to entrants competing in several classes, ranging from dirt bikes, ATVs, side-by-sides, buggies, truggy and custom fabricated race vehicles. Race teams range from factory-supported groups that build custom fabricated vehicles and provide chase vehicles via helicopter to much smaller and less glamorous sportsman teams competing in all-stock vehicles with no chase vehicle support. Stock Volkswagen Type One Beetles modified for use in off-road terrain, known as Baja Bugs, have been a common sight throughout the event duration, but the factory-supported, all-spaceframe Trophy Truck entries are the most visible.

In contrast to the current factory EX supported modern race vehicles that tend to dominate the car and truck classes, Erik Carlsson drove a basically stock front wheel drive Saab 96 V4, finishing third in 1969 and fifth in 1970.

== Baja course ==
- Point-to-point: A point-to-point race is one that starts and ends in two different locations. The start is traditionally held in Ensenada but has been held in Tijuana and Mexicali as well. The course length varies for a point to point but is often over 1,000 miles (1,600 km) and ends in La Paz.
- Loop race: A loop race is one that starts and finishes in the same location. Traditionally the race starts and ends in Ensenada but has started/finished in Mexicali as well. The course length varies from 600 to 850 miles, depending on the course route.

== Qualifying ==
The starting order is generally determined by a random draw, except when preferential starts are given to those who finished in top positions in the previous race/season, or when qualifying is held. For Trophy Trucks & Class 1 vehicles, qualifying for the Baja 1000 is now held during SEMA at the Las Vegas Motor Speedway.

== In popular culture ==
- In the film Timerider (1982), the hero Swann is competing in the Baja 1000 when he inadvertently stumbles on to a time warp experiment and is sent back to the Old West in the 1870s.
- In the 1980s television action series The Fall Guy, in the 4th season episode "Baja 1000", first aired on 28 November 1984. The series hero, Hollywood stunt man and part-time bounty hunter Colt Seavers (played by Lee Majors), is in the race, competing against villains trying to knock him out of the race in any way they can.
- The documentary Dust to Glory (2005) follows contestants of the 2003 Baja 1000.
- Baja: Edge of Control is a 2008 video game about the Baja 1000 developed by 2XL Games and published by THQ for PlayStation 3 and Xbox 360.
- In the film F1 (2025), the main protagonist, Sonny Hayes (played by Brad Pitt), competes in the Baja 1000 for a small team pro bono after his second retirement from Formula One, and footage of the event features throughout the end credits.

== Overall winners ==
Year	Route	Four-Wheelers			Motos & Quads		
Year	Route	Drivers	Vehicle	Time	Riders	Vehicle	Time
1967	Tijuana-La Paz	(United States) Vic Wilson (United States) Ted Mangels	Meyers Manx VW	27:38	(United States) J.N. Roberts (United States) Malcolm Smith	Husqvarna 360 Cross	28:48
1968	Ensenada-La Paz	(United States) Larry Minor (United States) Jack Bayer	Ford Bronco	21:11:32	(United States) Larry Berquist (United States) Gary Preston	Honda 325cc CL350 Scrambler	20:38:28
1969	Ensenada-La Paz	(United States) Larry Minor (United States) Rod Hall	Ford Bronco	20:48:10	(Sweden) Gunnar Nilsson (United States) J.N. Roberts	Husqvarna 500 TWIN	21:35:52
1970	Ensenada-La Paz	(United States) Drino Miller (United States) Vic Wilson Miller	VW	16:07	(United States) Mike Patrick (United States) Phil Bowers	Yamaha RT1 360	18:31
1971	Ensenada-La Paz	(United States) Parnelli Jones (United States) Bill Stroppe	Ford Bronco	14:59	(United States) Malcolm Smith (Sweden) Gunnar Nilsson	Husqvarna 400 Cross	16:51
1972	Mexicali-La Paz	(United States) Parnelli Jones (United States) Bill Stroppe	Ford Bronco	16:47	(Sweden) Gunnar Nilsson (Sweden) Rolf Tibblin	Husqvarna	19:19
1973	Ensenada-La Paz	(United States) Bobby Ferro (United States) Johnny Johnson	Funco VW	16:50	(United States) Mitch Mayes (United States) A.C. Bakken	Husqvarna	18:42:51
1974	No Race						
1975	Ensenada-Ensenada	(United States) Malcolm Smith (United States) Dr. Bud Feldkamp	Hi-Jumper VW	18:55:49	(United States) Al Baker (United States) Gene Cannady	Honda XL350	18:22:55
1976	Ensenada-Ensenada	(United States) Ivan Stewart	Chenowth VW	12:17:28	(United States) Larry Roeseler (United States) Mitch Mayes	Husqvarna	11:30:47
1977	Ensenada-Ensenada	(United States) Malcolm Smith (United States) Dr. Bud Feldkamp	Funco VW	15:10:42	(United States) Brent Wallingsford (United States) Scot Harden	Husqvarna	14:37:07
1978	Mexicali-Ensenada	(United States) Mark Stahl	Chenowth VW	12:55:42	(United States) Larry Roeseler (United States) Jack Johnson	Husqvarna	14:37:07
1979	Ensenada-La Paz	(United States) Walker Evans (United States) Bruce Florio	Dodge Pickup	20:48:27	(United States) Larry Roeseler (United States) Jack Johnson	Husqvarna 390	19:48:04
1980	Ensenada-Ensenada	(United States) Mark Stahl	Chenowth VW	13:33:55	(United States) Larry Roeseler (United States) Jack Johnson	Yamaha YZ490	12:45:13
1981	Ensenada-Ensenada	(United States) Mark McMillin (United States) Thomas Hoke	Chenowth VW	20:29:14	(United States) Scot Harden (United States) Brent Wallingsford	Husqvarna 430	17:14:05
1982	Ensenada-La Paz	(United States) Mickey Thompson (United States) Terry Smith	Raceco VW	19:40:23	(United States) Al Baker (United States) Jack Johnson	Honda XR500R	17:25:27
1983	Ensenada-Ensenada	(United States) Mark McMillin (United States) Ralph Paxton	Chenowth VW	20:29:14	(United States) Dan Smith (United States) Dan Ashcraft	Husqvarna 500XC	14:48:10
1984	Ensenada-Ensenada	(United States) Mark McMillin (United States) Ralph Paxton	Chenowth VW	16:27:09	(United States) Chuck Miller (United States) Randy Morales	Honda XR500R	14:34:34
1985	Ensenada-Ensenada	(United States) Steve Sourapas (United States) Dave Richardson	Raceco VW	17:54:55	(United States) Randy Morales (United States) Derrick Paiement	Honda CR500	17:44:42
1986	Ensenada-La Paz	(United States) Mark McMillin (United States) Ralph Paxton	Chenowth Porsche	18:26:28	(United States) Bruce Ogilvie (United States) Chuck Miller	Honda XR600R	18:05:52
1987	Ensenada-Ensenada	(United States) Bob Gordon (United States) Malcolm Smith	Chenowth Porsche	13:15:04	(United States) Dan Ashcraft (United States) Bruce Ogilvie	Honda XR600R	12:02:14
1988	Ensenada-Ensenada	(United States) Mark McMillin	Chenowth Porsche	18:07:09	(United States) Paul Krause (United States) Larry Roeseler (United States) Danny LaPorte	Kawasaki KX500	17:53:16
1989	Ensenada-La Paz	(United States) Robby Gordon	Ford Pickup	18:04:07	(United States) Larry Roeseler (United States) Danny LaPorte (United States) Ted Hunnicutt Jr.	Kawasaki KX500	17:53:16
1990	Ensenada-Ensenada	(United States) Bob Gordon (United States) Robyn Gordon (United States) Robby Gordon	Chenowth Chevrolet	12:30:45	(United States) Larry Roeseler (United States) Ted Hunnicutt Jr. (United States) Danny LaPorte	Kawasaki KX500	11:11:45
1991	Ensenada-Ensenada	(United States) Larry Ragland	Chevrolet Pickup	16:37:35	(United States) Larry Roeseler (United States) Ted Hunnicutt Jr. (United States) Marty Smith	Kawasaki KX500	13:35:25
1992	Ensenada-La Paz	(United States) Paul Simon (United States) Dave Simon	Ford Ranger	16:53:02	(United States) Danny Hamel (United States) Garth Sweetland (United States) Paul Ostbo	Kawasaki KX500	16:50:12
1993	Mexicali-Mexicali	(United States) Ivan Stewart	Toyota SR5	13:29:11	(United States) Danny Hamel (United States) Larry Roeseler (United States) Ty Davis	Kawasaki KX500	13:57:23
1994	Mexicali-Mexicali	(United States) Jim Smith	Ford TT	10:28:56	(United States) Danny Hamel (United States) Larry Roeseler (United States) Ty Davis	Kawasaki KX500	10:20:47
1995	Tijuana-La Paz	(United States) Larry Ragland	Chevrolet TT	20:14:12	(United States) Paul Krause (United States) Ty Davis (United States) Ted Hunnicutt Jr.	Kawasaki KX500	19:31:19
1996	Ensenada-Ensenada	(United States) Larry Ragland	Chevrolet TT	14:38:59	(United States) Paul Krause (United States) Ty Davis (United States) Greg Zitterkopf	Kawasaki KX500	14:11:02
1997	Ensenada-Ensenada	(United States) Larry Ragland	Chevrolet TT	13:53:46	(United States) Johnny Campbell (United States) Tim Staab (United States) Greg Bringle	Honda XR600R	13:19:59
1998	Santo Tomás-La Paz	(United States) Ivan Stewart	Toyota	19:08:20	(United States) Johnny Campbell (United States) Jimmy Lewis	Honda XR600R	18:58:48
1999	Ojos Negros-Ojos Negros	(United States) Larry Ragland	Chevrolet	14:26:36	(United States) Johnny Campbell (United States) Tim Staab	Honda XR650R	14:15:42
2000**	Ensenada-Cabo San Lucas	(United States) Dan Smith (United States) Dave Ashley	Ford	32:15:39	(United States) Johnny Campbell (United States) Tim Staab (United States) Craig Smith (United States) Steve Hengeveld	Honda XR650R	30:54:12
2001	Ensenada-Ensenada	(United States) Doug Fortin (United States) Charlie Townsley	Jimco Chevrolet	14:35:42	(United States) Johnny Campbell (United States) Tim Staab	Honda XR650R	13:51:40
2002	Ensenada-La Paz	(United States) Dan Smith (United States) Dave Ashley	Ford	16:19:03	(United States) Steve Hengeveld (United States) Johnny Campbell (United States) Andy Grider	Honda XR650R	16:17:28
2003	Ensenada-Ensenada	(United States) Doug Fortin (United States) Charlie Townsley	Jimco Chevrolet	16:24:02	(United States) Steve Hengeveld (United States) Johnny Campbell	Honda XR650R	15:39:52
2004	Ensenada-La Paz	(United States) Troy Herbst (United States) Larry Roeseler	Smithbuilt-Ford	16:18:14	(United States) Steve Hengeveld (United States) Johnny Campbell (United States) Kendall Norman	Honda XR650R	15:57:37
2005	Ensenada-Ensenada	(United States) Larry Roeseler (United States) Troy Herbst	Smithbuilt-Ford	15:06:19	(United States) Steve Hengeveld (United States) Johnny Campbell (United States) Mike Childress	Honda XR650R	14:20:30
2006	Ensenada-La Paz	(United States) Andy McMillin (United States) Robby Gordon	Chevrolet	19:15:17	(United States) Steve Hengeveld (United States) Mike Childress (United States) Quinn Cody	Honda CRF450X	18:17:50
2007	Ensenada-Cabo San Lucas	(United States) Mark Post (United States) Rob MacCachren (United States) Carl Renezeder	Ford	25:21:25	(United States) Robby Bell (United States) Kendall Norman (United States) Steve Hengeveld (United States) Johnny Campbell	Honda CRF450X	24:15:50
2008	Ensenada-Ensenada	(United States) Roger Norman (United States) Larry Roeseler	Ford	12:40:33	(United States) Robby Bell (United States) Kendall Norman (United States) Johnny Campbell	Honda CRF450X	12:29:10
2009	Ensenada-Ensenada	(United States) Andy McMillin (United States) Scott McMillin	Chevrolet	14:19:50	(United States) Kendall Norman (United States) Timmy Weigand (United States) Quinn Cody	Honda CRF450X	13:27:50
2010	Ensenada-La Paz	(Mexico) Tavo Vildósola (Mexico) Gus Vildósola	Ford F-150 TT	19:00:04	(United States) Kendall Norman (United States) Quinn Cody	Honda CRF450X	19:20:52
2011	Ensenada-Ensenada	(United States) Andy McMillin (United States) Scott McMillin	Ford Raptor TT	14:51:36	(United States) Kendall Norman (United States) Quinn Cody (United States) Logan Holladay	Honda CRF450X	14:14:25
2012	Ensenada-La Paz	(United States) BJ Baldwin	Chevrolet TT	20:00:59	(United States) Colton Udall (United States) Timmy Weigand (United States) David Kamo	Honda CRF450X	20:09:30
2013	Ensenada-Ensenada	(United States) BJ Baldwin	Chevrolet TT	18:36:10	(United States) Colton Udall (United States) Timmy Weigand (United States) David Kamo (United States) Mark Samuels	Honda CRF450X	18:29:14
2014	Ensenada-La Paz	(United States) Rob MacCachren (United States) Andy McMillin (United States) Jason Voss	Ford TT	22:31:27	(United States) Ricky Brabec (United States) Robby Bell (United States) Steve Hengeveld (United States) Max Eddy Jr.	Kawasaki KX450F	24:24:01
2015	Ensenada-Ensenada	(United States) Rob MacCachren (United States) Andy McMillin	Ford TT	15:38:33	(United States) Colton Udall (United States) Mark Samuels (United States) Justin Jones	Honda CRF450X	16:29:08
2016	Ensenada-Ensenada	(United States) Rob MacCachren (United States) Jason Voss	Ford TT	17:12:58	(United States) Justin Jones (United States) David Kamo (United States) Mark Samuels (Australia) Daymon Stokie (United States) Colton Udall	Honda CRF450X	18:16:42
2017	Ensenada-La Paz	(Mexico) Juan C. Lopez (Mexico) Apdaly Lopez	Ford TT	19:53:36	(Guatemala) Francisco Arredondo (United States) Shane Esposito (United States) Justin Morgan (United States) Max Eddy Jr. (United States) Ty Davis	Honda CRF450X	21:07:16
2018	Ensenada-Ensenada	(United States) Cameron Steele (United States) Pat Dean	Ford TT	16:24:02	(United States) Justin Morgan (United States) Mark Samuels (United States) Justin Jones	Honda CRF450X	16:23:26
2019	Ensenada-Ensenada	(Mexico) Alan Ampudia (Mexico) Aaron Ampudia	Ford TT	16:10:35	(United States) Justin Morgan (United States) David Kamo (United States) Max Eddy Jr (United States) Shane Esposito	Honda CRF450X	17:34:28
2020	Ensenada-Ensenada	(United States) Luke McMillin (United States) Larry Roeseler	Ford TT	19:10:25	(United States) Justin Morgan (United States) Mark Samuels (United States) Justin Jones	Honda CRF450X	20:50:30
2021	Ensenada-La Paz	(United States) Luke McMillin (United States) Rob MacCachren	Chevrolet TT	20:45:59	(United States) Justin Morgan (United States) Mark Samuels (Mexico) Brandon Prieto (United States) Kendall Norman	Honda CRF450X	23:07:18
2022	Ensenada-Ensenada	(United States) Luke McMillin (United States) Rob MacCachren	Chevrolet TT	16:37:45	(United States) Justin Morgan (United States) Mark Samuels (United States) Kendall Norman	Honda CRF450X	18:51:30
2023	La Paz–Ensenada	(United States) Bryce Menzies (United States) Andy McMillin (Mexico) Tavo Vildósola	Ford TT	22:35:33	(Bolivia) Juan Carlos Salvatierra (United States) Carter Klein (Argentina) Diego Llanos (United States) Shane Logan (United States) Corbin McPherson	KTM 450SX-F	26:33:41
2024	Ensenada-Ensenada	(United States) Luke McMillin (United States) Rob MacCachren	Chevrolet TT	15:54:37	(United States) Justin Morgan (United States) Tyler Lynn (Mexico) Brandon Prieto (United States) Ryan Surratt	Honda CRF450X	17:52:33
2025	Ensenada-Ensenada	(United States) Christopher Polvoorde (United States) Bryce Menzies	Ford TT	15:48:23	(United States) Tyler Lynn (United States) Carter Klein (United States) David Kamo (United States) Sam Pretscherer	Honda CRF450X	17:55:39
2026	San José del Cabo-San José del Cabo	(United States) Bryce Menzies (United States) Andy McMillin	Ford TT	16:28:29	(United States) Tyler Lynn (United States) Carter Klein (United States) Sam Pretscherer	Honda CRF450X	17:21:56

**Officially the race was called the Baja 2000 (1726 miles) for the year 2000.

== Notable competitors ==
=== Most overall car wins ===
- 7: Rob MacCachren, Andy McMillin
- 5: Mark McMillin and Larry Ragland
- 4: Larry Roeseler, Luke McMillin
- 3: David Ashley, Bryce Menzies, Doug Fortin, Robby Gordon, Ralph Paxton, Dan Smith, Malcolm Smith and Ivan Stewart

=== Most overall motorcycle wins ===
- 11: Johnny Campbell
- 10: Larry Roeseler
- 8: Steve Hengeveld and Kendall Norman
- 7: Mark Samuels and Justin Morgan
- 5: Ty Davis, David Kamo
- 4: Quinn Cody, Ted Hunnicutt Jr., Jack Johnson, Justin Jones, Tim Staab and Colton Udall

=== Other notable drivers ===
- Alan Ampudia
- BJ Baldwin
- Ron Bishop
- Ken Block
- Pete Brock
- Jenson Button
- Erik Carlsson
- Kurt Caselli
- Anna Jo Cody
- Marc Coma
- Justin Davis
- Chuck Dempsey
- Patrick Dempsey
- Walker Evans
- Andrew "Freddie" Flintoff
- Elliot Forbes-Robinson
- Tanner Foust
- James Garner
- Brendan Gaughan
- Tony Gera
- Bob Gordon
- Beccy Gordon
- Mike Groff
- Robbie Groff
- Roberto Guerrero
- Rod Hall
- Chris Harris
- Riley Herbst
- Troy Herbst
- Larry Janesky
- Tanner Janesky
- Jimmie Johnson
- Ricky Johnson
- Austin Jones
- Parnelli Jones
- P. J. Jones
- Michel Jourdain Jr.
- Michel Jourdain Sr.
- Danny LaPorte
- Justin Lofton
- Apdaly Lopez
- Kristen Matlock
- Hiro Matsushita
- Mike "Mouse" McCoy
- Mary McGee
- Hershel McGriff
- Corky McMillin
- Steve McQueen
- Chad McQueen
- Casey Mears
- Rick Mears
- Roger Mears
- Bryce Menzies
- Rhys Millen
- Rod Millen
- John Morton
- Michael Nesmith
- Paul Newman
- Gunnar Nilsson
- Bruce Ogilvie
- Danny Ongais
- Cody Parkhouse
- Travis Pastrana
- Robbie Pierce
- Christopher Polvoorde
- Toby Price
- Jeff Proctor
- Don Prudhomme
- J.N. Roberts
- Alexander Rossi
- Armin Schwarz
- Jim Smith
- Eric Solorzano
- Cameron Steele
- Danny Sullivan
- Mickey Thompson
- Jūgatsu Toi
- Johnny Unser
- Jimmy Vasser
- Frank "Scoop" Vessels
- Gus Vildósola
- Tavo Vildósola
- Paul Weel

== Current and past classes ==
=== Four-Wheelers ===
- SCORE Trophy Truck: Open Production Unlimited Trucks.
- SCORE Trophy Truck Spec: Open Production stock engine Trucks.
- SCORE Class 1: Unlimited open-wheel single-or two-seaters.
- SCORE Class 1/2-1600: open-wheel single-or two-seaters to 1600cc.
- SCORE Class 2: Unlimited 2.2-liter buggy.
- SCORE Class 3: Short wheelbase 4x4.
- SCORE Class 4: Unlimited 2.2-liter open wheel.
- SCORE Class 5: Unlimited Baja Bugs.
- SCORE Class 5-1600: 1600cc Baja Bugs.
- SCORE Class 6: V6 powered tube chassis trucks
- SCORE Class 7: Open mini trucks.
- SCORE Class 7S: Stock mini trucks. (3000cc)
- SCORE Class 7SX: Modified mini trucks. (4000cc)
- SCORE Class 8: Full-sized two-wheel drive trucks.
- SCORE Class 9: Short wheelbase, open-wheel single- or two-seaters.
- SCORE Class 10: Open-wheel single or two-seaters to 2000cc.
- SCORE Class 11: Stock VW Sedans.
- SCORE Lites Class 12: VW limited open-wheel single-(1776cc) or two-seaters(1835cc).
- SCORE Class 17: Jeepspeed
- SCORE Stock Full: Stock full-sized trucks.
- SCORE Stock Mini: Stock mini trucks. (4300cc)
- SCORE Class M-Truck: Utility vehicle
- SCORE Baja Challenge: Limited, identical open-wheel Baja touring cars.
- SCORE Sportsman Buggy:
- SCORE Sportsman Truck:
- SCORE Sportsman UTV:
- ProTruck: Limited Production Trucks governed by the Baja ProTruck Off-Road Race Series

=== Motorcycles ===
- SCORE Class 20: 125cc or smaller two-stroke and 250cc or smaller four-stroke motorcycles.
- SCORE Class 21: 126cc to 250cc.
- SCORE Class 22: 250cc or more.
- SCORE Class 30: Riders over 30 years old.
- SCORE Class 40: Riders over 40 years old.
- SCORE Class 50: Riders over 50 years old.
- SCORE Class 60: Riders over 65 years old.
- SCORE Sportsman MC > 250cc: Sportsman riders 250cc (2-stroke) or 450cc (4-stroke) or greater.
- SCORE Sportsman MC < 250cc: Sportsman riders 250cc (2-stroke) or 450cc (4-stroke) or less.

=== ATVs ===
- SCORE Class 21: Honda.
- SCORE Class 25: 251cc or more.

== See also ==
- Baja 250
- Baja 500
- Dust to Glory, Documentary about the 2003 race
- Mini-Baja
- Timerider
