= Jūgatsu Toi =

Japanese travel writer

- Born: 28 October 1948; Shinjuku, Tokyo, Japan
- Died: 28 July 2013 (aged 64); Japan
- Other names: Toi October, Toy October
- Occupations: Travel writer and visual producer
- Years active: 1980-2013

Jūgatsu Toi (戸井 十月, Toi Jūgatsu; 12 October 1948 – 28 July 2013) was a Japanese travel writer and visual producer. He became a travel writer after his activity as an illustrator and reporter.

== Early life ==
Toi was born in Shinjuku, Tokyo on 12 October 1948. His father was Shozo Toi, who was the first researcher of the Chichibu Incident.

== Career ==
Reporting on the Bōsōzoku in Japan led him to get a motorcycle driver's licence at the age of 32, and begin motorcycling abroad. He covered more than 250,000 kilometers, more than 50 countries and across five continents. He has also visited Hiroo Onoda's farm in Brazil, to report on the former Japanese army intelligence officer trained by the Nakano School who was stationed on Lubang Island in the Philippines. He has the most entries to off-road race Baja 1000, held in Baja California, Mexico, as Japanese. He had the plan to motorcycle the entire course of five continents.

== Illness and death ==
Toi was diagnosed with lung cancer. He died of the illness on July 28, 2013, in Japan, aged 64. His funeral took place on July 29, one day after his death, and was attended by close relatives.

== Books ==
=== Fiction ===
- Toi, Jūgatsu (1993). 越境者 [Border jumper]. Kodansha. ISBN 978-4062065566.

=== Nonfiction ===
- Toi, Jūgatsu (1980). シャコタン・ブギ―暴走族女リーダーの青春 [Shakotan Boogie — girl bosozuko, youth leader]. Kadokawa Shoten. ASIN B000J87ZHY.
- Toi, Jūgatsu (1985). 冒険王―路地から世界へ [Adventure king — from the streets to the world]. Kodansha. ISBN 978-4062018456.
- Toi, Jūgatsu (1987). よろしく、ベイ・シティ [Best regards, Bay City]. Kadokawa Shoten. ISBN 978-4041526040.
- Toi, Jūgatsu (1988). 走れ、コヨーテ [Run, coyote]. Kadokawa Shoten.
- Toi, Jūgatsu (1989). 陽と風の道標―北南米大陸縦断3万キロ [30,000 kilometer milepost of wind and sun - longitudinally across the North and South American continents]. Kodansha. ISBN 978-4062041621.
- Toi, Jūgatsu (1989). 荒野から―男をみがく冒険旅行のすすめ [From the wilderness — The science of adventure travel to polish the man]. Scholastic. ISBN 978-4796200066.
- Toi, Jūgatsu (1991). 鷲と蠍 [Scorpion and eagle]. Kodansha. ISBN 978-4062054232.
- Toi, Jūgatsu (1992). 止められるか、俺たちを―暴走族写真集 [You can stop us — gang photo album] (First ed.). Daisan Shokan. ISBN 978-4-8074-9201-5.
- Toi, Jūgatsu (1992). エルドラドへの道 [Road to El Dorado]. Asahi Shinbun. ISBN 978-4022564627.
- Toi, Jūgatsu (1995). 旅人に訊け [Travelers of your true desire]. Shobunusha. ISBN 978-4794962102.
- Toi, Jūgatsu (1999). 世界で一番贅沢な旅 [The world's most luxurious journey]. Shogakukan. ISBN 978-4093895712.
- Toi, Jūgatsu (2004). チェ・ゲバラの遥かな旅 [Che Guevara's Journey Far] (in Japanese). Shueisha. ISBN 978-4087477535.
- Toi, Jūgatsu (2005). 小野田寛郎の終わらない戦い [Hiroo Onoda's fight to the finish]. Shinchosha. ISBN 978-4-10-403104-7.
- Toi, Jūgatsu (2007). 植木等伝「わかっちゃいるけど、やめられない!」 [Hitoshi Ueki "I just can't stop!"]. Shogakukan. ISBN 9784093797795.
- Toi, Jūgatsu (2011). 道、果てるまで―ユーラシア横断3万キロの日々+4大陸10万キロの記憶 [Across Eurasia by road, days of 30,000 kilometers + 4 continents and 100,000 kilometers of memories]. Shinchosha. ISBN 978-4104031061.
