= Malcolm Smith (motorcyclist) =

American motorcycle racer (1941–2024)

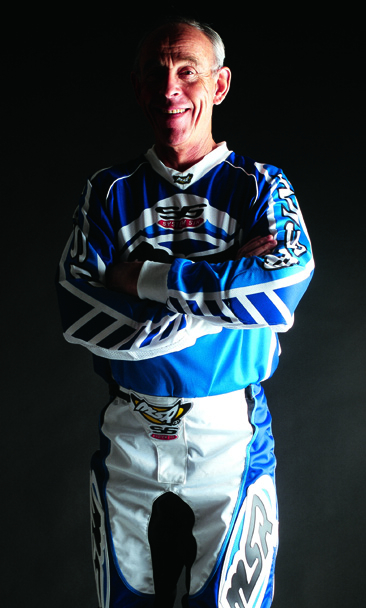
Smith in 2000

Malcolm Smith (March 9, 1941 – November 26, 2024) was a Canadian-American off-road racer. He was born on Salt Spring Island, British Columbia, Canada, and died in Riverside, California.

== Career ==
Smith first raced in 1956 atop a 1949 Matchless 500cc motorcycle. Later, he was associated with Husqvarna motorcycles. His renown grew as he won races in the 1960s and 1970s. Smith won eight gold medals between 1966 and 1976 in the International Six Day Trial. The International Six Day Trials, a form of off-road motorcycle Olympics, is the oldest annual competition sanctioned by the FIM dating back to 1913.

Smith was a five-time overall winner of the Baja 1000 (two on motorcycles and three on cars); a four-time winner of the Baja 500 (one in motorcycles and three in cars); has twice won the Mint 400 in Nevada and the Roof of Africa Rallye; finished fourth in the 1988 Paris–Dakar Rally on cars; and was the overall winner of the 1987 Atlas Rallye in Morocco.

Following his racing career, Smith began developing tools and riding gear. Malcolm Smith Gold Medal Products later became Malcolm Smith Racing (later MSR). MSR was eventually purchased by Tucker Rocky Distributing. He later owned a motorsports dealership in Riverside, California, with his wife Joyce and two of his four children, daughter Ashley and son Alexander.

Smith was inducted into the Off-road Motorsports Hall of Fame in 1978, the Motorsports Hall of Fame of America in 1996, and the Motorcycle Hall of Fame in 1998.

== Racing on film ==
Smith starred in Bruce Brown's motorcycle documentary On Any Sunday, alongside Steve McQueen and American Motorcyclist Association Grand National Champion Mert Lawwill. The film was nominated for an Academy Award in 1972 for Best Documentary Feature.

Smith continued to appear in motion pictures, including Naturally Free (1975), Dirt (1979), and On Any Sunday II (1981). Smith was later featured in the 2005 Baja 1000 documentary, Dust to Glory, co-starring Mario Andretti and Robby Gordon.

== Off the track ==
In 2000, Smith created a non-profit foundation dedicated to giving back to Mexico. Every year, Smith hosted a six day charity ride to raise money for his schools and orphanages.

Smith was married three times and had four children. He died on November 26, 2024, from complications of Parkinson's disease at his home in Riverside, California, aged 83.
