= David Kamo =

American motorcycle racer

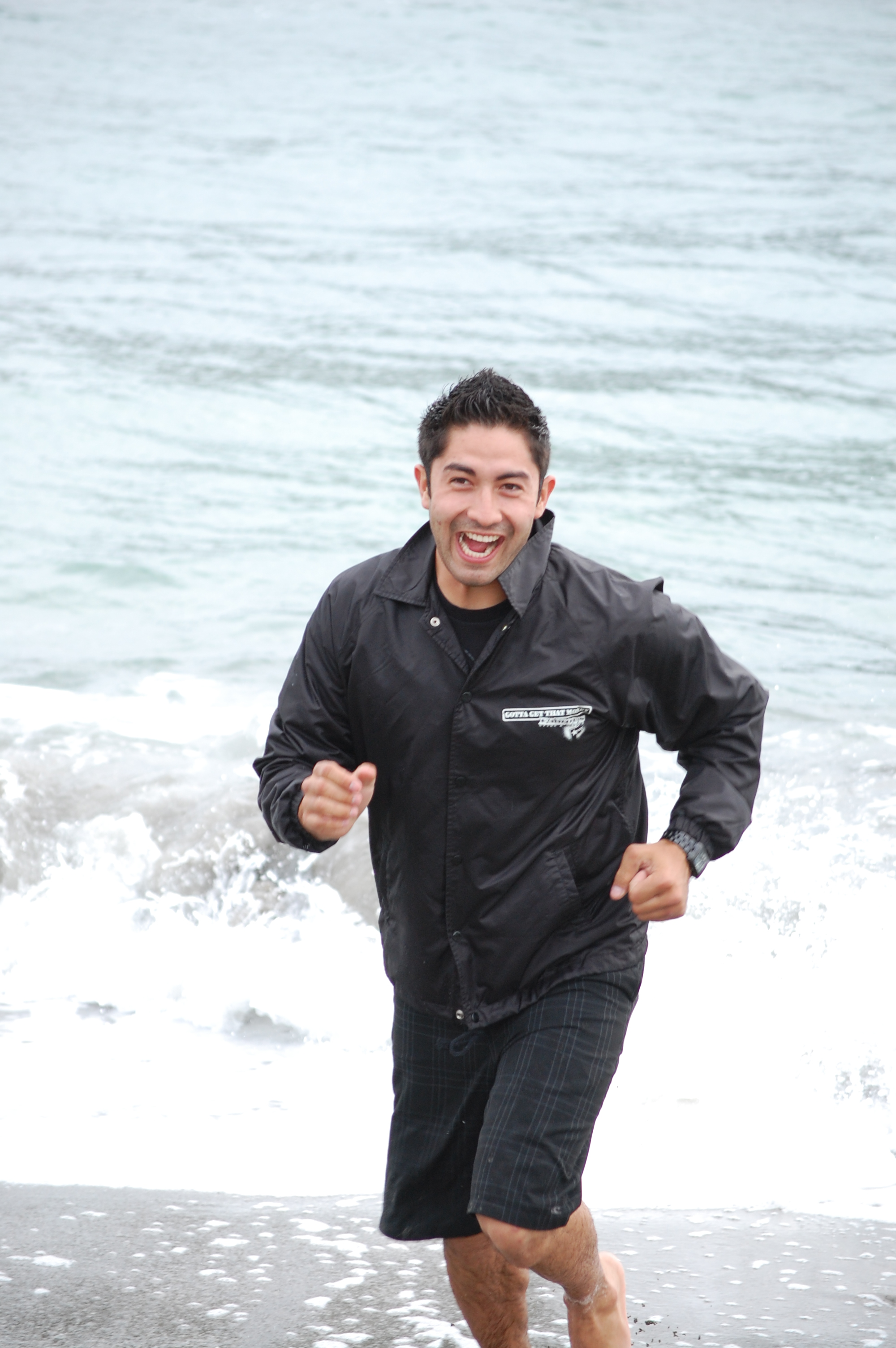
- David Kamo

Personal information
- Full name: David Hiroshi Kamo
- Nicknames: KAMO-KAZI, Wasabi
- Born: August 4, 1986 (age 40) Boise, Idaho
- Height: 5 ft 11 in (1.80 m)
- Weight: 185 lb (84 kg)

Sport
- Sport: Off-Road Motorcycle Racing
- Events: Hare and Hound, ISDE, BITD, Hare Scrambles
- Turned pro: 2007
Medal record
Third place	2009	A.M.A. National Hare and Hound
Second place	2008	AMA National Hare & Hound Championship Series
First place	2008	Idaho City ISDE Qualifier
Gold medal – first place	2008	ISDE Jr. Trophy Team Captain
	2007	AMA National Hare & Hound Championship - Series 4th Overall
	2007	ISDE Jr. Trophy Team GOLD medal winner – 3rd top USA rider

David Kamo (born August 4, 1986, in Boise, Idaho) is an American professional motorcycle enduro rider. He has competed for the KTM factory team at the AMA National Hare and Hound, Best In The Desert, International Six Days Enduro, World Enduro Championship and Western Hare Scrambles series.

== Personal life ==
Kamo is an only child born to Curt and Kathleen "Kit" Kamo. He graduated from New Plymouth High School in New Plymouth, Idaho and attended Treasure Valley Community College, receiving certification in many types of welding. David currently lives in Caldwell, Idaho.

== Achievements ==
- 2013 SCORE Pro Motorcycle Champion, JCR Honda
- 2012 SCORE Pro Motorcycle Champion, JCR Honda
- 2009 A.M.A. National Hare and Hound, 3rd Overall
- 2009 BITD TSCO "Vegas to Reno" The Long Way! 1st Overall
- 2008 A.M.A. National Hare and Hound, 2nd Overall
- 2007 A.M.A. National Hare and Hound, 4th Overall
- 2005 Red Bull Last Man Standing, 8th Overall

== Future ==
Kamo is currently racing the AMA National Hare and Hound Series in the Pro Class. He is also expanding on his Mountain Bike Racing this summer, racing his first 7-day stage race The BC Bike Race in Canada, Summer 2015.

== Career ==
=== 2010 ===
Series	Event	Date	Location	Position	Teammates
Hare and Hound	Round 1	January 24, 2010	Lucerne, CA	2nd Overall	
Hare and Hound	Round 2	February 14, 2009	Ridgecrest, CA	3rd Overall	

=== 2009 ===
Series	Event	Date	Location	Position	Teammates
Hare and Hound	Round 1	January 25, 2009	Lucerne, CA	2nd Overall	
Hare and Hound	Round 2	February 8, 2009	Ridgecrest, CA	1st Overall	
Hare and Hound	Round 3	March 15, 2009	El Centro, CA	4th Overall	
Hare and Hound	Round 4	April 26, 2009	Lucerne Valley, CA	4th Overall	
Best In The Desert	Blue Water Grand Prix	May 9, 2009	Parker, AZ	1st Overall	David Pearson
Hare and Hound	Round 5	May 16, 2009	Jericho, UT	1st Overall	
ISDE Qualifier	Idaho City 100	May 30–31, 2009	Idaho City, ID	1st Overall	
World Enduro Championship	WEC Mexico	July 18–19, 2009	Valle de Bravo, Mexico	DNF	
Best In The Desert	Vegas to Reno the Long Way!	August 20–22, 2009	Las Vegas, NV	1st Overall	David Pearson
Hare and Hound	Round 6	September 26, 2009	Wendover, NV	3rd Overall	
Hare and Hound	Round 7	October 3, 2009	Jericho, UT	3rd Overall	
International Six Day Enduro	2009 ISDE Portugal	October 12–17, 2009	Figueira da Foz, Portugal	DNF	
Hare and Hound	Round 8	October 25, 2009	Lucerne Valley, CA	3rd Overall	

== Sponsors ==
- PCI Race Radios PCI Race Radios
- KTM North America KTM North America
- Mark Kariya - Photographer
