= Trophy truck =

Vehicle used in high-speed off-road racing

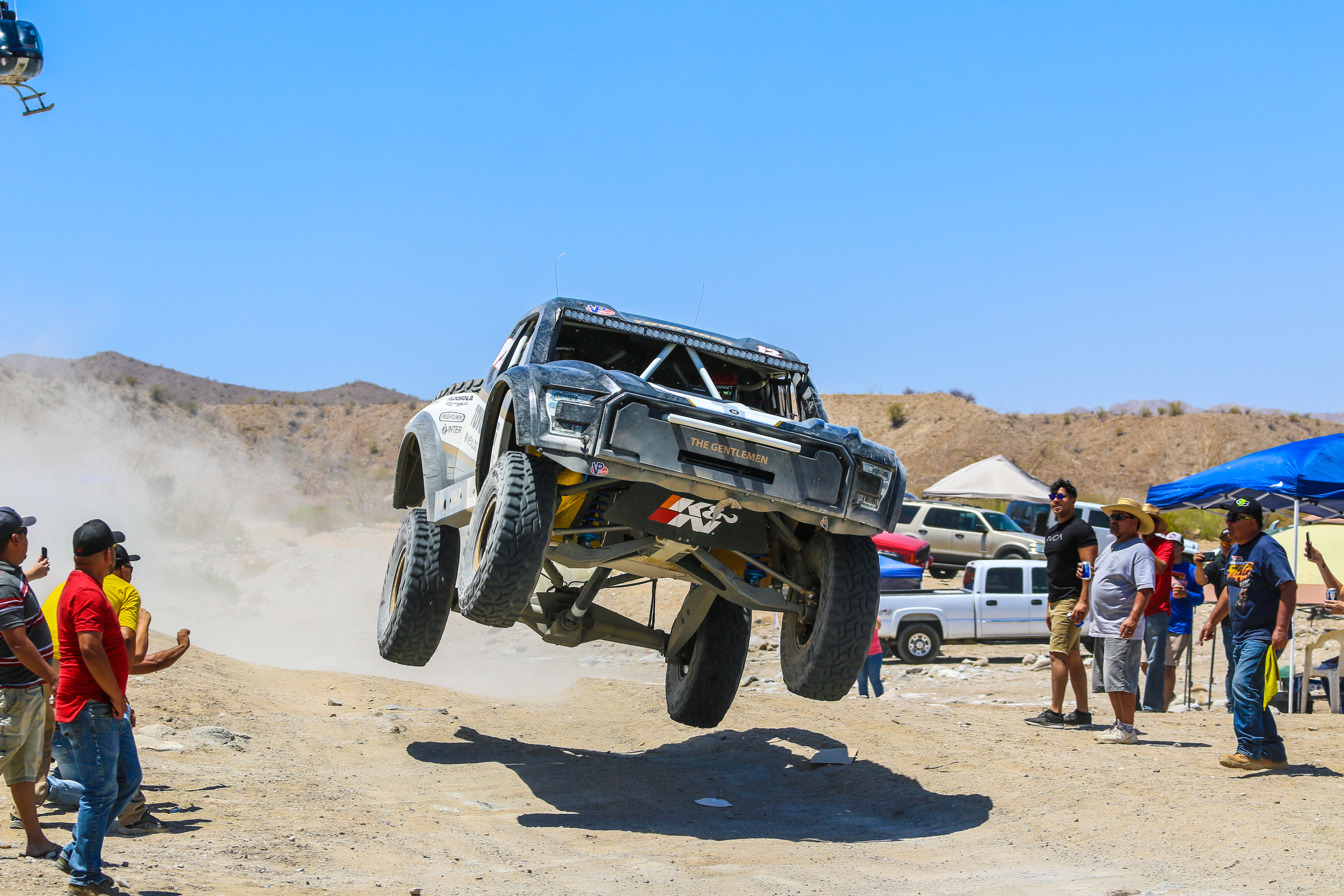
Gus Vildósola trophy truck at the 2018 Baja 500

A trophy truck, also known as a Baja truck or trick truck, is a vehicle used in high-speed off-road racing. This is an open production class and all components are considered legal unless specifically restricted.

Although any truck that meets the safety standards can race the trophy truck class, they, for the most part, feature long travel suspensions and high power (800hp+) engines. They are intended for desert racing only, and are not street legal. These vehicles are properly known as "trophy trucks" when raced in SCORE International sanctioned races, and "trick trucks" when raced in Best in the Desert sanctioned races.

Since the class was introduced in 1994, the development of the trophy truck has been rapid. Prior to that date, SCORE's Class-8 rules dictated that the entrants must use a production frame. The introduction of the trophy truck class brought with it new freedom for competitors with minimal rules in its construction. Intense development in full-tube chassis and suspension travel led to previously unseen performance and speed.

== History ==
With no proven formula, the initial trophy truck designs varied widely, usually with no two trucks the same. Over a development process of ten years, eventually engineering firms like Geiser Brothers, Jimco, Racer Engineering, and ID Designs became known for producing successful trucks. In recent years new truck builder Mason Motorsports Inc., has produced an AWD platform that many of the top racers are seeing successful finishing results in.

== Truck design ==
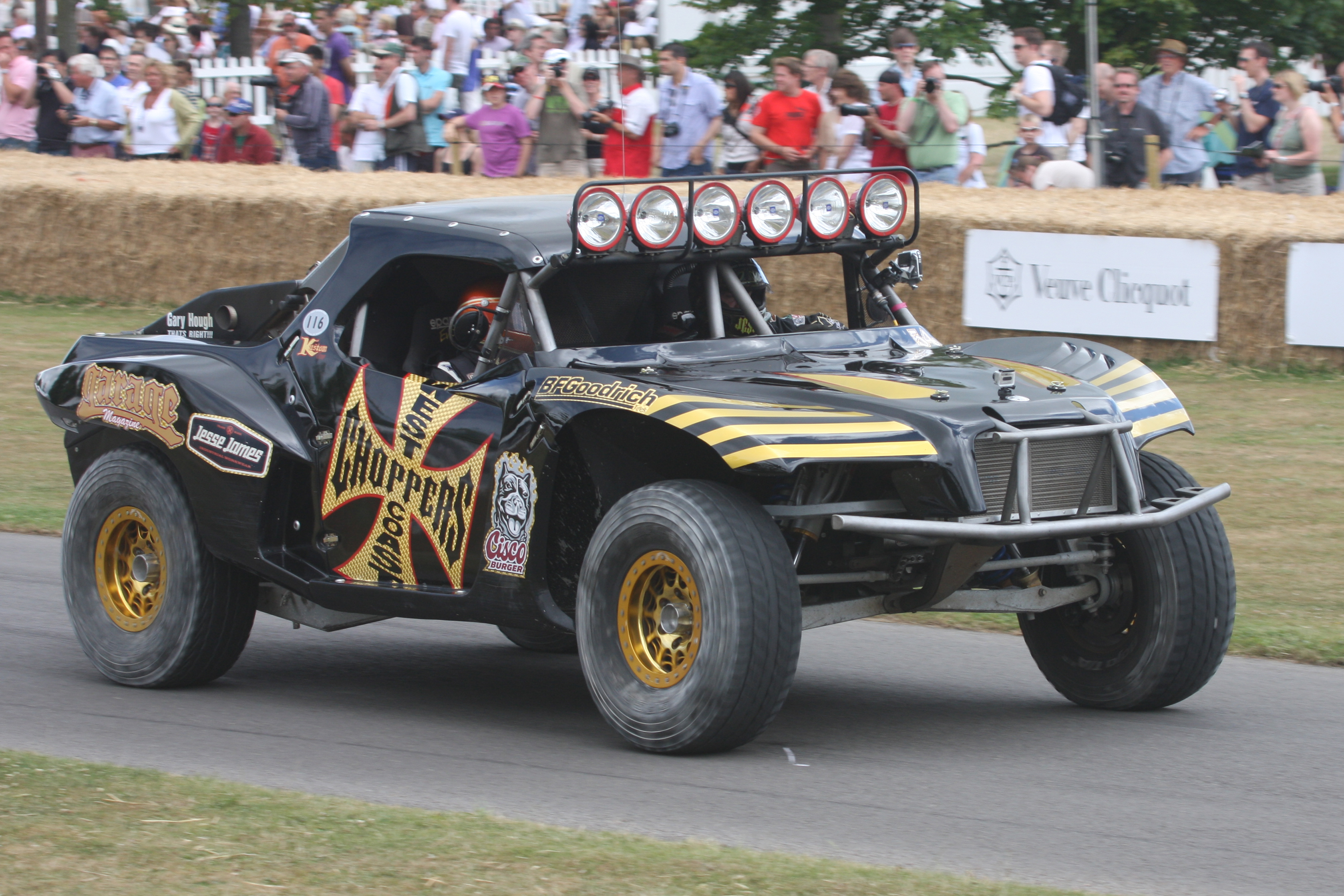
A trophy truck in 2009

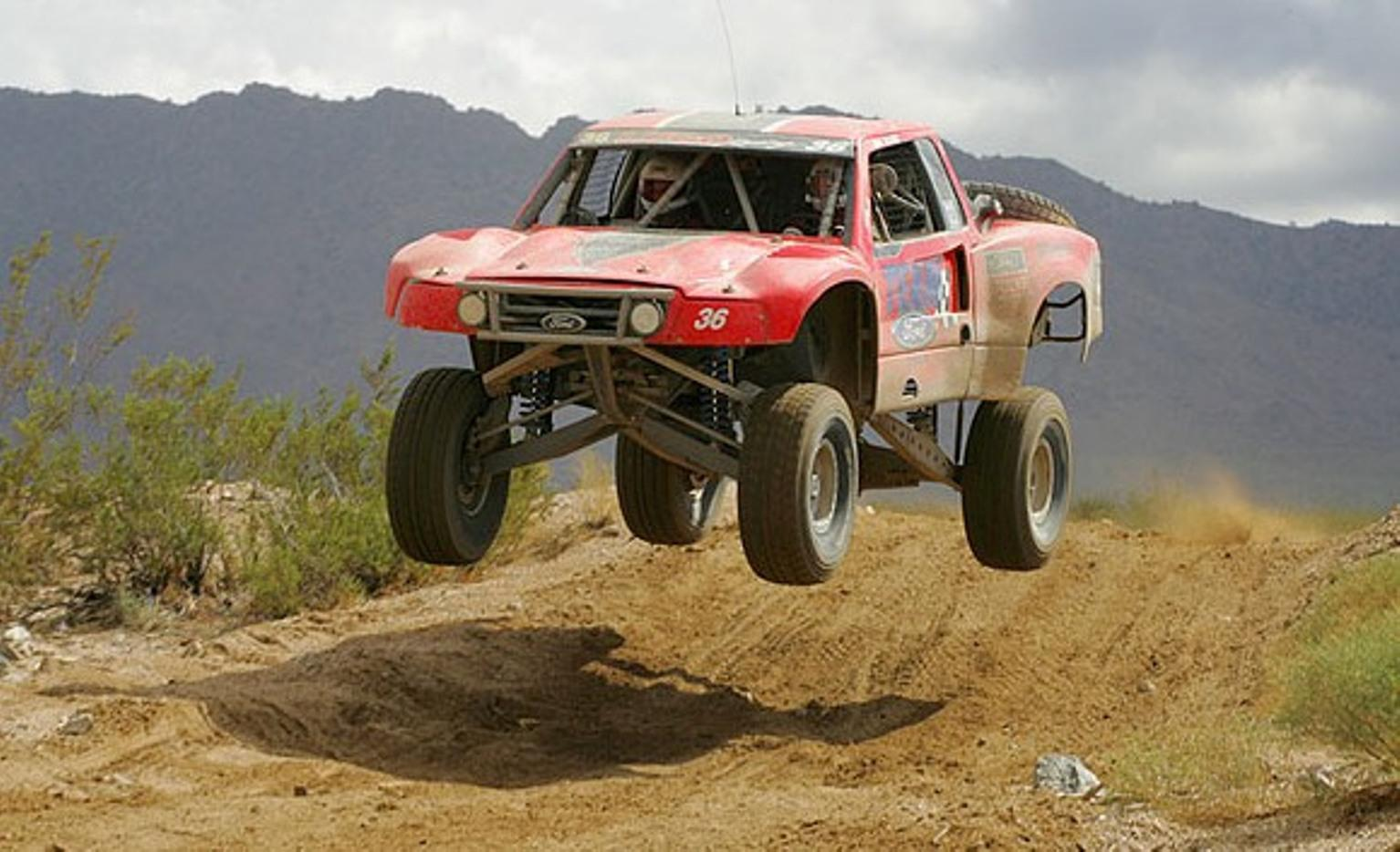
Steve Olliges Team Ford Trophy Truck

Trophy trucks have been traditionally two-wheel drive (RWD) as the construction of driveline components capable of withstanding the high horsepower, torque at high speeds offroad was prohibitively expensive. Recent developments have seen more than one truck builder implementing all-wheel drive equipment. Most feature a 4130 chromoly steel tube-frame chassis covered by an aerodynamically engineered composite body. Most trophy trucks are powered by large displacement V8 engines producing over 1100 horsepower. All trucks are equipped with a steel tube roll cage. The SCORE International Rule Book defines and specifies the trophy truck requirements.

Gasoline engines are naturally aspirated, and typically Ford or Chevrolet V8 engines, generating in excess of 1100 hp and 950lb-ft of torque. Turbo charged diesel motors are allowed, with a minimum size of 5.0 liters to a maximum size of 6.6 liters, with two turbo chargers. Turbo engines must be fitted with an air restrictor.

Suspension travel is around 24 inches (61 cm) of wheel travel in the front and 36 inches (91 cm) of travel in the rear, although this may vary depending on chassis design. Most trophy trucks use independent A-arm front suspension designs. In the rear, most trucks feature a three or four-link setup with a solid rear axle, while some use various types of independent suspension. Suspension and damping duties are handled by one or two shock absorbers per wheel, usually consisting of one coil-over and one by-pass shock. Fox Racing Shox, Bilstein, and King Shocks are popular among competitors.

Tires are typically 40 inches (100 cm) tall or larger on 17-inch (43 cm) lightweight alloy wheels. Trophy trucks usually carry two spare tires in case of puncture. Total wet weight is around 6,500 pounds (2,900 kg) minimum, with the mass necessary to absorb the rougher terrain in desert racing.

Transmission is a choice of either three-speed automatic or six-speed sequential gearbox. The three-speed TH400 gearbox predates the Baja 1000 but remains popular among competitors due to the long gear ratios and capability of handling the torque spikes caused by off-road racing. The six-speed sequential gearbox appeals to competitors due to the ease of changing gear ratios quickly.

== See also ==
- Beach racing
- Desert racing
- Monster truck
- Off-road racing
- Pickup truck racing
- Short course off-road racing, a form of off-road racing using vehicles similar to trophy trucks
- Truck racing
- Stadium truck
- Truggy
