= Best in the Desert =

American off-road racing association

Best In The Desert
- Sport: Desert off-road racing
- Abbreviation: BITD
- Headquarters: Las Vegas Valley

Official website
- www.bitd.com

The Best In The Desert Racing Association (BITD) is an American desert off-road racing association, based out of Las Vegas, Nevada. It was founded by Casey Folks in 1984, and is currently owned by his sons Daryl and Bryan Folks. The BITD was originally a motorcycle-only series, until the Vegas To Reno, the longest off-road race in the United States, was introduced in 1996 with four-wheel classes.

== Events ==
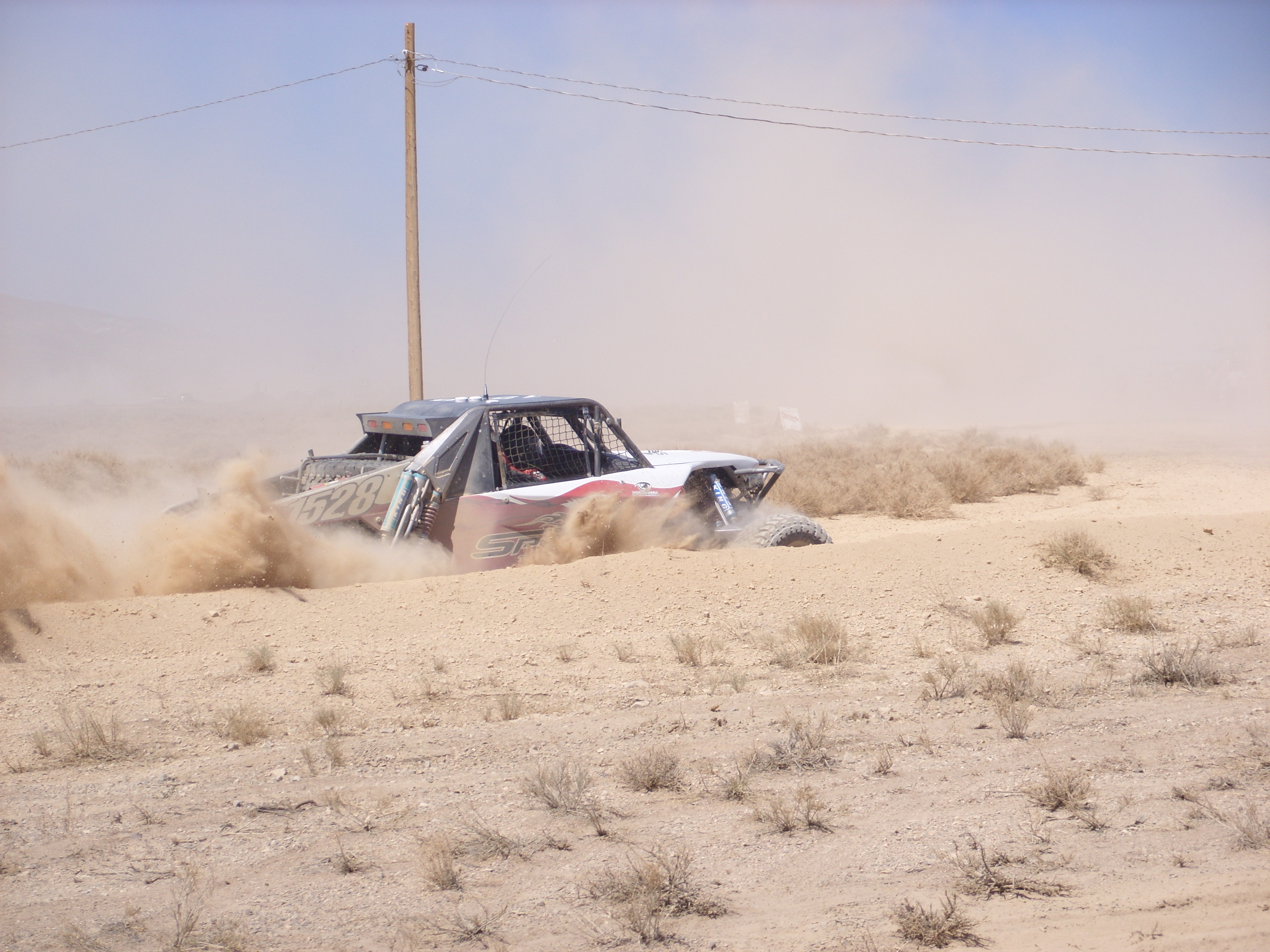
A Class 1 Buggy racing in the 2008 Vegas to Reno event

2026 season

- Vegas to Reno (1996–present): The flagship event of the series.
- Silver State 300
- Laughlin Desert Classic
- Mint 400
- The Parker 400
- Vegas to Reno Legends Rally

Former

- Parker 425 (cars and trucks only): The event began in 1971 as a NORRA event. SCORE International sanctioned the event until 1998. Whiplash Motorsports held the event the next four years, until BITD began sanctioning it in 2003. The 2008 had over 300 entrants. The 2023 edition was cancelled, and BITD dropped its sanctioning for the 2024 edition.
- Parker 250 (motorcycles, quads and UTVs only)
- UTV Legends Championship (motorcycles, quads and UTVs only)
- Bluewater Desert Challenge
- Henderson 250
- Battle Born 200
- Adelanto Grand Prix (motorcycles only)
- World Hare & Hound Championship (motorcycles, quads and UTVs only)

== Media ==
Events are nationally televised on MavTV, its website, and the America One Sports Network.

== Divisions ==
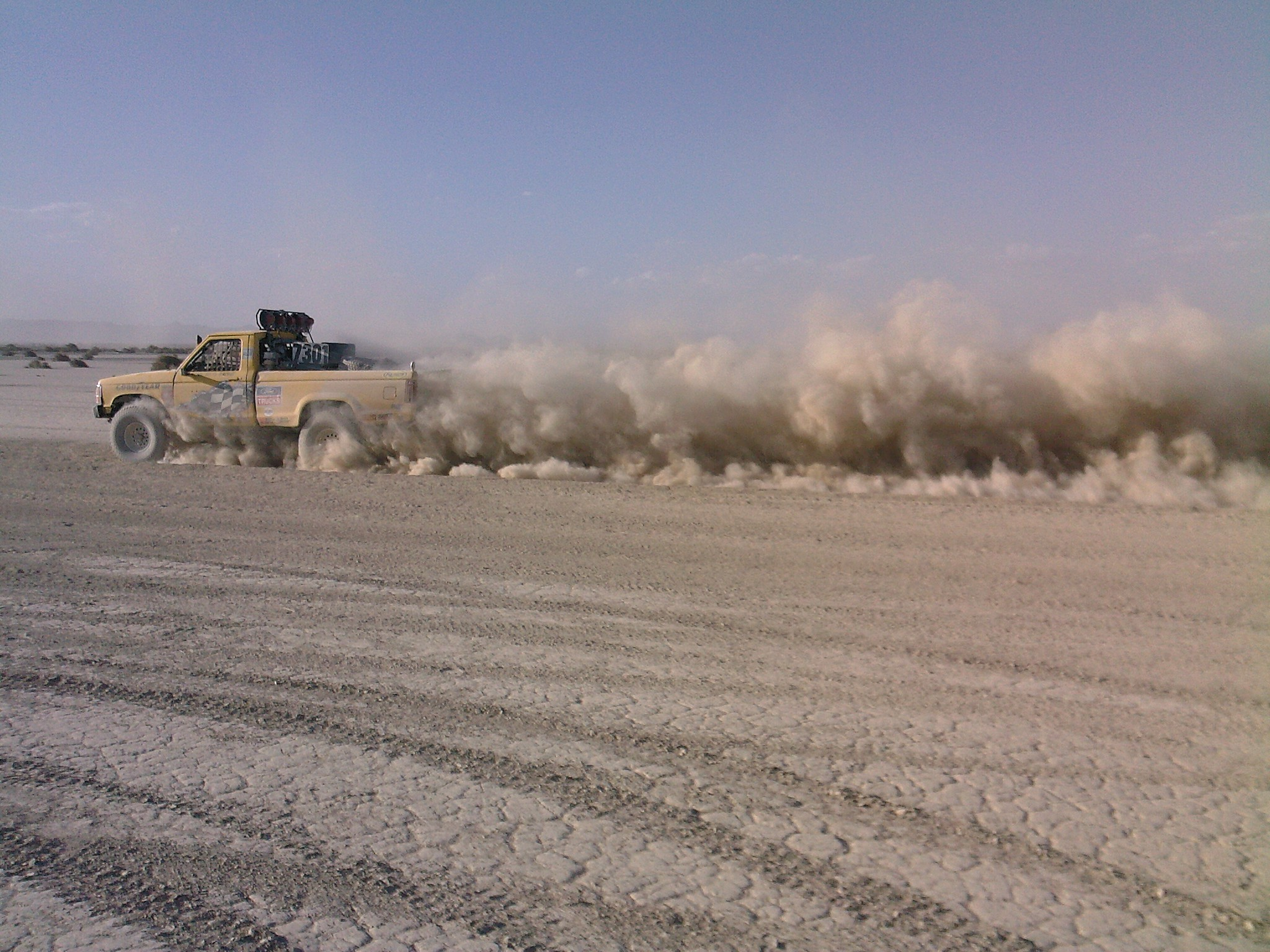
7300 class

Best In The Desert has classes of Trick Trucks (a.k.a. Trophy Truck), buggies, motorcycles, Quads. Various events have different classes of racing vehicles.

== Notable drivers ==
- Steve Olliges
- Robby Gordon
- Mike Groff
- Robbie Groff
- Rod Hall
- Rob MacCachren
