= Primm 300 =

Terrible's SCORE Primm 300 was an off-road race that took place yearly in Primm, Nevada in September. The Primm 300 was part of a series of races that included the Baja 1000, Baja 500 and San Felipe 250. The event had various types of vehicle classes such as stock VW, production vehicles, buggies, trucks, and custom fabricated race vehicles. The race consisted of 4 loops on a 69-mile course on the east side of Interstate 15 near the Nevada-California state line. The main pits and start/finish area were just north of Buffalo Bill's. Due to environmental concerns chasing is not allowed, pits were permitted only in designated locations, spectator access is limited but available.

== Classes ==
=== Cars and Trucks ===
- SCORE Trophy Truck: Open Production Unlimited Trucks.
- SCORE Class 1: Unlimited open-wheel single- or two-seaters.
- SCORE Class 1/2-1600: Limited suspension. open-wheel single- or two-seaters. (1600 cc)
- SCORE Class 2: Limited 2.2 liter buggy.
- SCORE Class 3: Production short wheelbase 4X4 Jeeps.
- SCORE Class 4: Unlimited 2.2 liter open wheel.
- SCORE Class 5: Unlimited Baja Bugs.
- SCORE Class 5-1600: Baja Bugs. (1600cc)
- SCORE Class 6: V6 powered tube chassis trucks
- SCORE Class 7: Open mini trucks.
- SCORE Class 7S: Stock mini trucks. (3000cc)
- SCORE Class 7SX: Modified mini trucks. (4000cc)
- SCORE Class 8: Full-sized two-wheel drive trucks.
- SCORE Class 9: Short wheelbase, open-wheel. single- or two-seaters. (1600cc)
- SCORE Class 10: Open-wheel single or two-seaters. (2000cc)
- SCORE Class 11: Stock VW Sedans. (1600cc)
- SCORE Lites Class 12: VW limited open-wheel. single seat(1776cc) or two-seaters(1835cc).
- SCORE Class 17: Production short wheelbase 4X4 Modified Jeeps.
- SCORE Stock Full: Stock full-sized trucks.
- SCORE Stock Mini: Stock mini trucks. (4300cc)
- SCORE Baja Challenge: Limited, identical open-wheel Baja touring cars.
- SCORE Sportsman Buggy:
- SCORE Sportsman Truck:
- SCORE Sportsman UTV: 660cc, 4-wheel utility vehicle.

== Overall winners ==
	Cars & Trucks		
Year	Drivers	Vehicle	Class
1996	Robby Gordon, Orange, Calif.	Ford F-150	TT
1997	Curt LeDuc, Cherry Valley, Calif.	Jeep Grand Cherokee	TT
1998	Ed and Tim Herbst, Las Vegas	Ford F-150	TT
1999	Troy Herbst, Las Vegas	Smithbuilt Ford	1
2000	Steve Sourapas, Rancho Santa Fe, Calif.	Jimco Chevy	1
2001	Troy Herbst, Las Vegas	Smithbuilt Ford	1
2002	Mike Julson, Santee, Calif. - Bob Lofton, Westmorland, Calif.	Jimco Chevy	1
2003	Tim Herbst/Ed Herbst, Las Vegas	Ford F-150	TT
2004	Alan Pflueger, Honolulu	Chevrolet Silverado	TT
2005	Brian Collins, Las Vegas - Larry Ragland, Cave Creek, Ariz.	Chevrolet Silverado	TT
2006	Bob Shepard, Phoenix	Chevrolet Silverado	TT
2007	Garron Cadiente, Mesa, Ariz.	Ford F-150	TT
2008	Roger Norman, Reno, Nev. - Larry Roeseler, Irvine, Calif.	Ford F-150	TT
2009	Robby Gordon, Charlotte, N.C.	Chevrolet CK1500	TT
2010	Jesse Jones, Litchfield Park, Ariz.	Chevrolet Silverado	TT
