= Vildosola Racing =

Vildosola Racing is the professional SCORE Trophy Truck #21 (originally #4, changed to #21 on 2010) off-road racing team based in San Diego, California. It is owned and operated by Gus and Tavo Vildósola. The team races in numerous off-road circuits, including SCORE/Tecate Baja series and Best In The Desert (BITD).

== Off-Road Racing ==
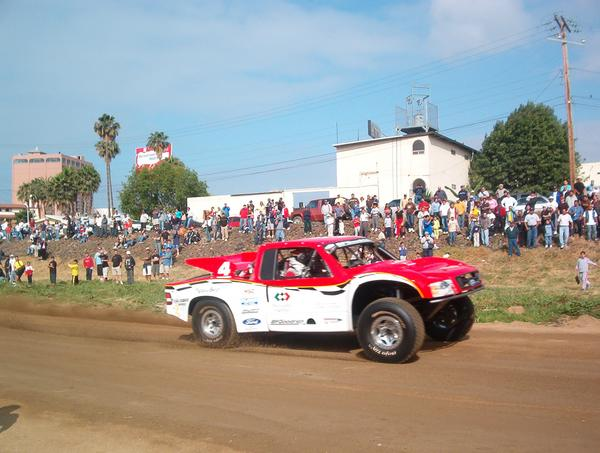
Gus Vildósola driving his SCORE Trophy Truck during the 2005 Baja 500

Gus Vildósola and Vildosola Racing have been in off-road racing since 1968. He started racing in local races in the Mexicali area.

In 1984, Gus Vildósola began racing in the Baja 1000 when one of his cousins invite him to race along with him in a 5-1600. In 1995 he decided to build his own 5-1600 with Vildosola Racing. He quickly jumped into larger engine vehicles.

In 1996 Ivan Stewart built a ProTruck for Vildosola Racing which Vildósola raced in the 1997 season achieving a second place championship in the SCORE International series. In 1998 Vildosola Racing made the switch to the SCORE Class 1 buggy which they raced until 2001.

In 2002 Vildosola Racing decided to race a SCORE Trophy Truck the highest category in Off-Road racing. Vildosola Racing won its first overall during the San Felipe 250 in 2003 with Gus Vildósola and Rob MacCachren sharing driving duties, becoming the first Mexico national team to win a SCORE International race. In the Baja 1000 of that same year Vildósola and MacCachren shared the wheel again finishing 3rd in the trophy truck class.

In the 2004 Baja 1000 Vildósola finished 6th in the trophy truck class timing 17:56.13 (56.65 mph).

From 2005 to 2007 the team raced two vehicles, their #4 Trophy Truck and an Ivan Stewart built Toyota Tundra ProTruck which Tavo Vildósola raced for 3 years. He won championships in the 2006 and the 2007 campaigns.

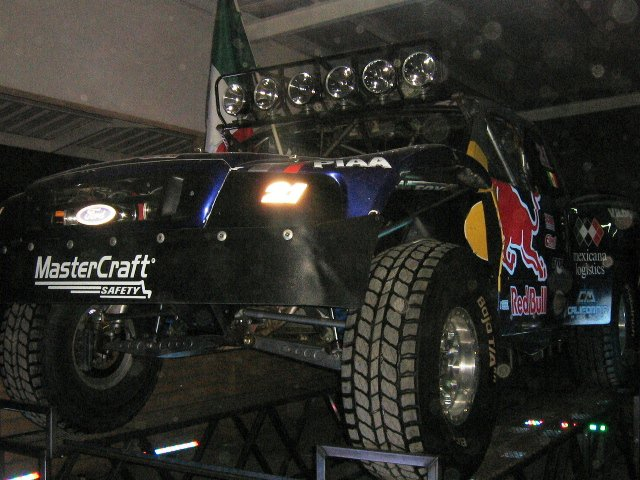
Vildosola Racing SCORE Trophy Truck during the 2010 Baja 1000 victory celebration in Mexicali

Tavo Vildósola jumped in the Trophy Truck driver's seat in the Baja 1000 of 2007, the 40th edition of the race. They had a second-place finish making it, at the time, the best finish position ever achieved by a Mexico national team in the Baja 1000, this achievement was only surpassed by Vildosola Racing itself on 2010 winning the overall on the 43rd edition of the premiere desert off-road race.

The team changed the colors and image of their Trophy Truck before the 2010 San Felipe 250, right after they renewed contract with Red Bull. At that time they decided to change the number on the truck from #4 to #21 to make it a complete image change.

Vildosola Racing managed to finish second during the 2010 Baja 500 after battling with Andy McMillin for the lead. Tavo Vildósola led a good portion of the race but finish second after having problems a few miles of the finish line in Ensenada, Baja California, Mexico. Vildosola Racing earned the best finish position of all time in the Baja 500 for any Mexico national team on the elite class, the Trophy Truck.

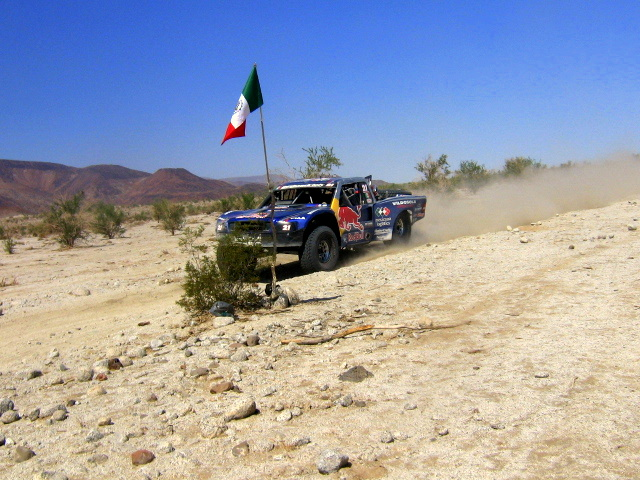
Vildosola Racing SCORE Trophy Truck during the 2011 CODE Off Road Mexicana Logistics 300

Vildosola Racing is the inaugural Mexico national team to win overall a Baja 1000 breaking all then-existing records event for time and speed. The team stopped the clocks on 19:00.04 at 55.88 miles per hour (89.93 km/h), making it the first time since 1973 that a trophy truck won the overall best time over a motorcycle at the Baja 1000. This happen during the 43rd edition of the race in 2010, on Trophy Truck #21 driven by Gus Vildósola and Tavo Vildósola.

The 2011 season started with Vildosola Racing taking 3rd place overall on the 2011 SCORE Laughlin Desert Challenge with a final time of 1:56:37 (51.45 mph).

After a good start on the San Felipe 250 Tavo was leading the race until on race mile 90 the trophy truck had a broken transmission which took the team nearly an hour to replace. The team finished 13th with a time of 5:03.57.

Tavo raced at the inaugural Tecate SCORE San Felipe Challenge of Champions in September 2011, started 4th and led a big portion of the race after having mechanical problems at mile 190. He finished 9th with a time of 7:33:21.

Vildosola Racing presented a new Trophy Truck for the 2012 Tecate SCORE Baja 500. The new Trophy Truck was built by Dave Clark and Vildosola Racing, its lighter and narrower than the old truck and also was built to use 42" wheels. The team started 22nd and was able to pass several drivers after a transmission failure left them out of the race while running 6th.

For the 2012 Baja 1000 Tavo and Gus got a 28th starting position draw, (started 25th after a few withdraws) which would make things harder for them as they would have a lot of dust and trucks before them. Around race mile 1000 Vildósola had passed all of his competitors and for the second time in a row on a peninsula run won the Baja 1000 overall, beating the motorcycles again, only the second time this happens since 1973, the previous time been in 2010 when Vildósola won the overall. The father and son duo stopped the clocks at 19:45:00 (56.79 mph) and are the inaugural Mexico national team to have 2 Baja 1000 titles as the overall winners of the race.

5 days after the 2012 Baja 1000 a protest was filed against Vildósola from the BJ Baldwin team which accused Vildósola of having made an illegal pit stop on the highway. The protest was accepted by SCORE International against their own rules, protests cannot be filed after 24 hours of the unofficial results are made public. SCORE penalized Vildósola with 90 mins demoting him to 8th place overall and stripping him from the race title.

The 2013 San Felipe 250 was finished first by Bryce Menzies, with Vildósola 3 seconds behind. Menzies failed to cross a Virtual Check Point which cost him a 5-minute penalty. This was Vildósola's second overall win on the San Felipe 250.

== 2014 ==
The 2014 season had Vildosola Racing 6 times. The team had the best start in its history ending up in the top 2 in the first 3 races of BiTD and SCORE International's San Felipe 250.

For the opening race of the 2014 series for BiTD the Parker 425, Tavo had a 2nd-place finish with a time of 7:18:11.466 only 10 seconds behind the O/A winner Jason Voss and 22 seconds in front of 3rd place Mark Weyhrich. The 3 lap race had what many called the closest finish in off-road racing.

San Felipe 250 brought another victory for the Vildosola team, winning a consecutive San Felipe race and for the third time in their history, having started it in 20th position since the qualifying for this race was ruled out for a draw. Tavo finished the race in 3:31:27.320. Vildosola was quoted saying he was happy to win this race which he considered his home race due to the proximity of the race course to Mexicali.

At the Mint 400 Tavo had yet another great performance, finishing a strong 2nd place behind Andy McMillin. Vildosola had qualified 8th for this race and after problems with Mark Weyhrich's trick truck just 30 miles before the finish line Tavo locked in another podium for the 2014 season.

== Best Results ==
Year	Series	Race	Finish	Class	Driver(s)
1996	SCORE International	San Felipe 250	1st	ProTruck	Gus Vildósola
2000	SCORE International	Baja 2000	5th	Class 1	Gus Vildósola
2002	SCORE International	Baja 1000	4th	SCORE Class 1/2-1600	Tavo Vildósola
2003	SCORE International	San Felipe 250	1st	SCORE Trophy Truck	Gus Vildósola, Rob MacCachren
2003	SCORE International	Baja 1000	3rd	SCORE Trophy Truck	Gus Vildósola, Rob MacCachren
2004	SCORE International	Baja 1000	6th	SCORE Trophy Truck	Gus Vildósola, Rob MacCachren
2005	SCORE International	Baja 1000	3rd	ProTruck	Tavo Vildósola
2006	SCORE International	SCORE Laughlin Desert Challenge	1st^	ProTruck	Tavo Vildósola, Bryan Freeman
2006	Best In The Desert	Parker 425	1st	ProTruck	Tavo Vildósola, Bryan Freeman
2006	Best In The Desert	Parker 425	4th^	SCORE Trophy Truck	Gus Vildósola, Tavo Vildósola
2006	SCORE International	San Felipe 250	1st	ProTruck	Tavo Vildósola, Bryan Freeman
2006	Best In The Desert	Vegas to Reno	1st	ProTruck	Tavo Vildósola, Bryan Freeman
2006	Best In The Desert	Vegas 300	1stª	SCORE Trophy Truck	Gus Vildósola, Tavo Vildósola
2006	CODE Off-Road	Mexicana Logistics 300	1stª	SCORE Trophy Truck	Gus Vildósola, Tavo Vildósola
2007	SCORE International	Baja 500	1st	ProTruck	Tavo Vildósola, Bryan Freeman
2007	SCORE International	Baja 500	9th	SCORE Trophy Truck	Gus Vildósola, Tavo Vildósola
2007	SCORE International	Baja 1000	2nd	SCORE Trophy Truck	Gus Vildósola, Tavo Vildósola
2009	CODE Off-Road	Race Ready 275	1stª	SCORE Trophy Truck	Gus Vildósola, Tavo Vildósola
2009	SCORE International	Baja 1000	4th	SCORE Trophy Truck	Gus Vildósola, Tavo Vildósola
2010	SCORE International	Baja 500	2nd	SCORE Trophy Truck	Tavo Vildósola
2010	Best In The Desert	Vegas to Reno	3rd	SCORE Trophy Truck	Gus Vildósola, Tavo Vildósola
2010	CODE Off-Road	Mexicana Logistics 300	1stª	SCORE Trophy Truck	Gus Vildósola, Tavo Vildósola
2010	SCORE International	Baja 1000	1stª	SCORE Trophy Truck	Gus Vildósola, Tavo Vildósola
2011	SCORE International	SCORE Laughlin Desert Challenge	3rd	SCORE Trophy Truck	Gus Vildósola, Tavo Vildósola
2012	CODE Off-Road	Mexicana Logistics 300	2nd	SCORE Trophy Truck	Tavo Vildósola
2012	CODE Off-Road	Mexicana Logistics 300	4th	SCORE Trophy Truck	Gus Vildósola
2012	SCORE International	Baja 1000	8th*	SCORE Trophy Truck	Gus Vildósola, Tavo Vildósola
2013	SCORE International	San Felipe 250	1st	SCORE Trophy Truck	Gus Vildósola, Tavo Vildósola
2014	Best In The Desert	Parker 425	2nd	Trick Truck	Tavo Vildósola
2014	SCORE International	San Felipe 250	1st	Trick Truck	Tavo Vildósola
2014	Best In The Desert	Mint 400	2nd	Trick Truck	Tavo Vildósola

- ^

== Sponsors ==
Mexicana Logistics, Red Bull, BFGoodrich, Mastercraft, California Metals, Fox Shox, PIAA, MSD Ignition, Eibach Springs, OGIO, Papas & Beer

== Operations ==
Vildosola Racing is based in San Diego, California.

El Cajon and Lakeside have the largest concentration of off-road businesses, teams, and enthusiasts in the country. It is also where the off-road business first took root in the United States.

== Races ==
SCORE International/Tecate: Baja 1000, Baja 500, San Felipe 250, SCORE Laughlin Desert Challenge, Primm 300, San Felipe Challenge of Champions

Best in the Desert (BiTD): Vegas to Reno, Parker 425, Vegas 300

CODE Off-Road: Mexicana Logistics 300, Race Ready 275.

PROBAJA: Dos Mares 500

NORRA: Mexican 1000 Rally

== Drivers ==
- (Mexico) Gus Vildósola
- (Mexico) Tavo Vildósola
