= Tavo Vildósola =

Off-Road racer, first Mexican national to win the Baja 1000

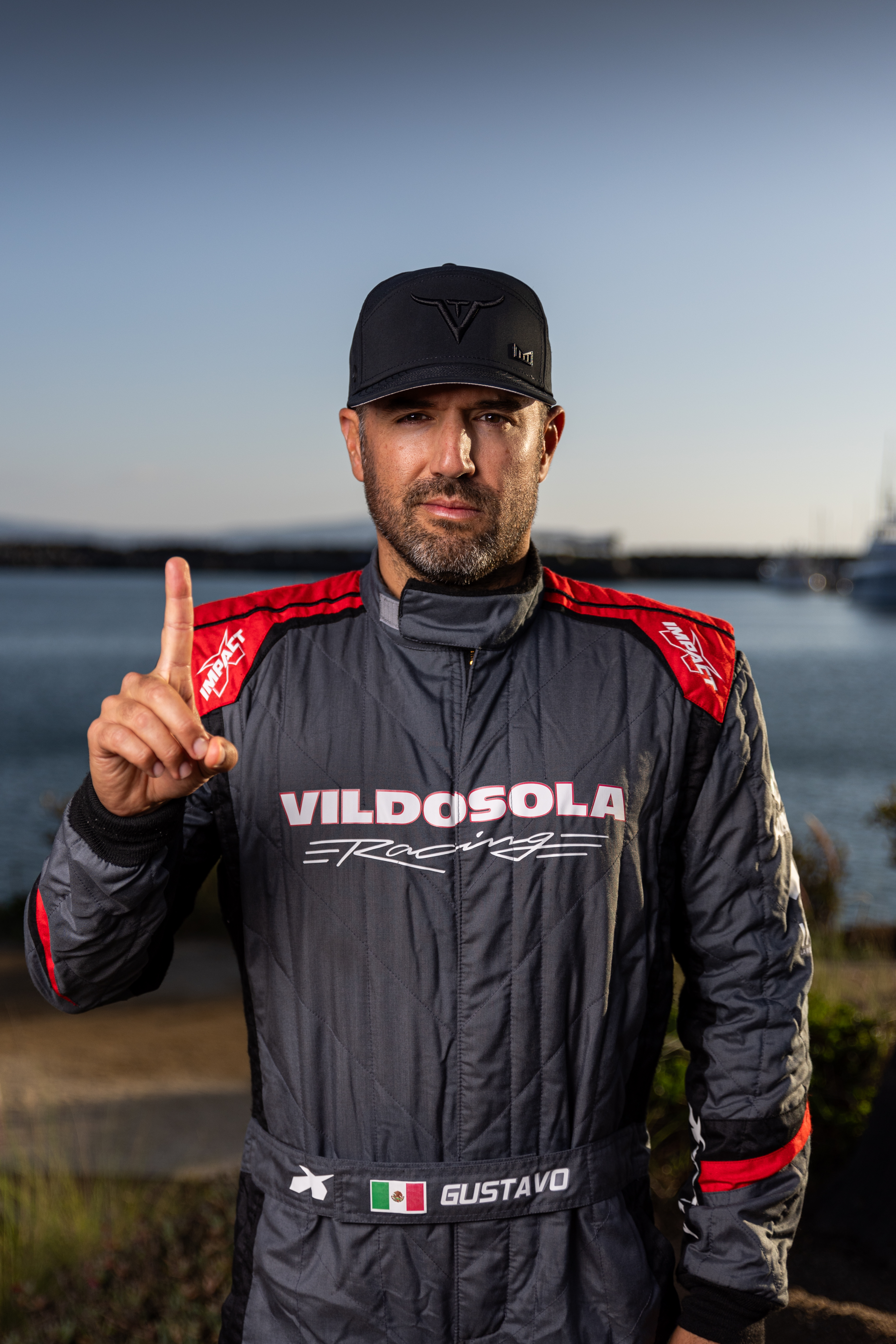

Gustavo Vildósola Perez Tejada (born February 1, 1982), better known as Tavo Vildósola, is a Mexican off-road racer and entrepreneur.

== Racing career ==
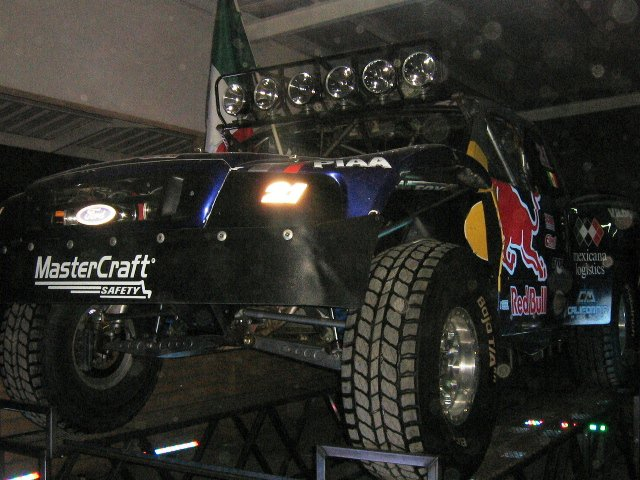
Vildosola Racing Red Bull SCORE Trophy Truck during the 2010 Baja 1000 victory celebration in Mexicali

Born in Mexicali, Vildosóla started racing at a very young age. He raced his first official off-road race in 2000, sharing the wheel of a SCORE Class 1 buggy in the San Felipe 250, in preparation for the Baja 2000. In the Baja 2000 he was the copilot of Chris Harrold in the SCORE Class 1 buggy of Vildosola Racing.

Tavo and Brian Ickler raced a SCORE Lites class vehicle for the 2003 Baja 1000 and finished first in their class with a time of 19:18.17 (41.86 mph).

In 2005 Vildósola raced an Ivan Stewart built ProTruck #204 powered by a Toyota V8 engine and was crowned champion of its class in 2006 and 2007 in the SCORE series.

Tavo jumped on the SCORE Trophy Truck driver's seat in the 2007 Baja 1000, the 40th edition of the race. Vildósola and his father Gus Vildósola finished in second place, making it, at the time, the best finish position ever achieved by a Mexican national team in the Baja 1000. This achievement was only surpassed by Vildosola Racing itself in 2010, by winning the overall on the 43rd edition of the premiere off-road desert race.

Vildosola Racing managed to finish second during the 2010 Baja 500 after Andy McMillin. Tavo led a good portion of the race but finished second after having problems a few miles from the finish line in Ensenada, Baja California. Vildosola Racing made history again by this being the best finish position of all time for any Mexican national team on the elite class, the Trophy Truck on any Baja 500.

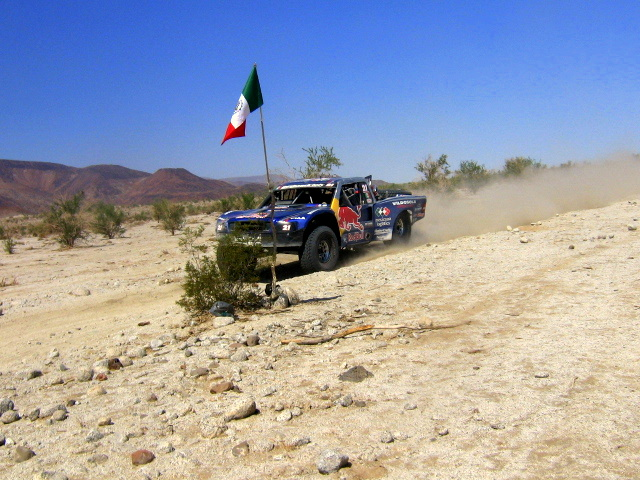
Vildosola Racing SCORE Trophy Truck during the 2011 CODE Off Road Mexicana Logistics 300

Tavo won the overall in the 43rd edition of the Tecate SCORE Baja 1000, making him, alongside his father Gus Vildósola, the first Mexican national to win the Baja 1000. He drove Trophy Truck #21 of team Vildosola Racing to the finish line in 19:00.04 (55.87 mph). Since 1973, a 4-wheel vehicle had not won the overall time against the motorcycles.

The 2011 SCORE season started with Vildosola Racing taking third place overall on the 2011 SCORE Laughlin Desert Challenge with a final time of 1:56:37 (51.45 mph).

After a good start on the San Felipe 250 Tavo was leading the race until on race mile 90 the trophy truck had a broken transmission which took the team nearly an hour to fix. The team finished 13th with a time of 5:03.57.

Tavo raced at the inaugural Tecate SCORE San Felipe Challenge of Champions in September 2011, started fourth and led a big portion of the race after having mechanical problems at mile 190. He finished ninth with a time of 7:33:21.

Vildosola Racing presented a new Trophy Truck for the 2012 Tecate SCORE Baja 500. The new Trophy Truck was built by Dave Clark and Vildosola Racing, its lighter and narrower than the old truck and also was built to use 42" wheels. The team started 22nd and was able to pass several drivers after a transmission failure left them out of the race while running 6th.

For the 2012 Baja 1000 Tavo and Gus got a 28th starting position draw, (started 25th after withdraws) which would make things harder for them as they would have a lot of dust and trucks before them. Around race mile 1000 Vildósola had passed all of his competitors and for the second time in a row on a peninsula run won the Baja 1000 overall, beating the motorcycles again, only the second time this happens since 1973, the previous time been in 2010 when Vildósola won the overall. The father and son duo stopped the clocks at 19:45:00 (56.79 mph) and made history again, being the only Mexico national team to have two Baja 1000 titles as the overall winners of the race.

Five days after the 2012 Baja 1000 a protest was filed against Vildósola from the BJ Baldwin team which accused Vildósola of having made an illegal pit stop on the highway. A video was released which showed a team member of the Vildósola crew illegally servicing the vehicle while it was in motion on the highway. The protest was accepted by SCORE International. SCORE penalized Vildósola with 90 mins demoting him to eighth place overall and stripping him from the race win.

The 2013 San Felipe 250 was won by Vildósola whom had end up second only three seconds behind Bryce Menzies, nevertheless Menzies failed to cross a Virtual Check Point which cost him a 5-minute penalty which gave Vildósola his 2nd overall win on the San Felipe 250.

== 2014 ==
The 2014 season brought six races for Vildosola Racing, and the team had the best start in history for them, having to end up in the top 2 in the first three races of BiTD and SCORE International's San Felipe 250.

For the opening race of the 2014 series for BiTD the Parker 425, Tavo had a second-place finish with a time of 7:18:11.466 only 10 seconds behind the O/A winner Jason Voss and 22 seconds in front of third place Mark Weyhrich. The 3 lap race had what many called the closest finish in off-road racing.

San Felipe 250 brought another victory for the Vildosola team, winning their second San Felipe race in a row and for the third time in their history, having started it in 20th position since the qualifying for this race was ruled out for a draw. Tavo finished the race in 3:31:27.320. Vildosola was quoted saying he was happy to win this race, which he considered his home race due to the proximity of the racecourse to Mexicali.

At the Mint 400 Tavo had yet another great performance, finishing a strong second place behind Andy McMillin. Vildosola had qualified eighth for this race and after problems with Mark Weyhrich's trick truck just 30 miles before the finish line, Tavo locked in another podium for the 2014 season.

== 2015 ==
The 2015 season was the best season for the Vildosola Team, winning two races in the SCORE series, and one in their only BiTD race.

At the 2015 opener for the SCORE series, Vildosola dominated the San Felipe 250. This win made them the inaugural team to title at three consecutive Felipe series races. Tavo finished 5 hours 10 minutes 16 seconds.

Tavo won the title at the 2015 Imperial Valley 250, making it the inaugural team to win in the same year two races in the SCORE series.

At the 2015 Parker 425, Tavo won the title. At the 2016 edition, Tavo successfully defended the title.

== Best Results ==
Year	Series	Race	Finish	Class
2002	SCORE International	Baja 1000	4th	SCORE Class 1/2-1600
2003	SCORE International	Baja 1000	1st	SCORE Lites
2005	SCORE International	Baja 1000	3rd	ProTruck
2006	SCORE International	SCORE Laughlin Desert Challenge	1st*	ProTruck
2006	Best In The Desert	Parker 425	1st*	ProTruck
2006	Best In The Desert	Parker 425	4th*	SCORE Trophy Truck
2006	SCORE International	San Felipe 250	1st*	ProTruck
2006	Best In The Desert	Vegas to Reno	1st*	ProTruck
2006	Best In The Desert	Vegas 300	1st+*	Trophy Truck
2006	CODE Off-Road	Mexicana Logistics 300	1st*	SCORE Trophy Truck
2007	SCORE International	Baja 500	1st	ProTruck
2007	SCORE International	Baja 500	9th	SCORE Trophy Truck
2007	SCORE International	Baja 1000	2nd	SCORE Trophy Truck
2009	CODE Off-Road	Race Ready 275	1st+	SCORE Trophy Truck
2009	SCORE International	Baja 1000	4th	SCORE Trophy Truck
2010	SCORE International	Baja 500	2nd	SCORE Trophy Truck
2010	Best In The Desert	Vegas to Reno	3rd	SCORE Trophy Truck
2010	CODE Off-Road	Mexicana Logistics 300	1st+	SCORE Trophy Truck
2010	SCORE International	Baja 1000	1st+	SCORE Trophy Truck
2011	SCORE International	SCORE Laughlin Desert Challenge	3rd	SCORE Trophy Truck
2011	CODE Off-Road	Mexicana Logistics 300	2nd	SCORE Trophy Truck
2012	CODE Off-Road	Mexicana Logistics 300	2nd	SCORE Trophy Truck
2012	SCORE International	Baja 1000	8th	SCORE Trophy Truck
2013	SCORE International	San Felipe 250	1st+	SCORE Trophy Truck
2014	Best in the Desert	Parker 425	2nd	Trick Truck
2014	SCORE International	San Felipe 250	1st+	Trophy Truck
2014	Best in the Desert	Mint 400	2nd	Trick Truck
2015	SCORE International	San Felipe 250	1st	Trophy Truck
2015	SCORE International	Imperial Valley 250	1st	Trophy Truck
2015	Best in the Desert	Henderson 250	1st	Trick Truck

(*)
(+) Best Overall Time

== Personal life ==
In 2014 Vildósola was appointed CEO of Mexicana Logistics.

He is the son of off-road racer Gus Vildósola. He is married to Leticia and has a daughter named Ximena.
