= Sal Fish =

Salvator Anthony Fish (born May 2, 1939 in Los Angeles, California) is a retired CEO/President of SCORE International, the leading sanctioning body in the sport of desert racing.

The SCORE race series include the Baja 1000, Baja 500, San Felipe 250, Primm 300, Laughlin Desert Challenge and Las Vegas Terrible's Cup. Fish earned an industrial relations degree at the University of San Francisco. Having first raced in Mexico in 1970, Fish started his entrepreneurial career in desert racing in 1973 when the late Mickey Thompson, founder of SCORE International, recruited him. Fish brought innovation to SCORE, organizing class rules, implementing safety procedures, and transforming the Baja 1000 into one of the most recognized motorsports events in the world today. In 1985, Fish brought unity to the sport when SCORE formed a combined series with Walt Lott and High Desert Racing Association (HDRA). Fish later teamed up with CFO, Ted Johnson to purchase SCORE International from Thompson in 1986 and HDRA in 1993.

== Award ==
Fish is a 2006 inductee in the Off-Road Motorsports Hall of Fame.

Fish was named the 2003 BFGoodrich Tires Motorsports Person of the Year.
