= Vildósola =

Vildósola is a surname. Notable people with the surname include:

- Gus Vildósola (born 1953), Mexican off-road racing driver and businessman
- Tavo Vildósola (born 1982), Mexican off-road racing driver

== See also ==
- Vildosola Racing, off-road racing team
