= SCORE Class M-Truck =

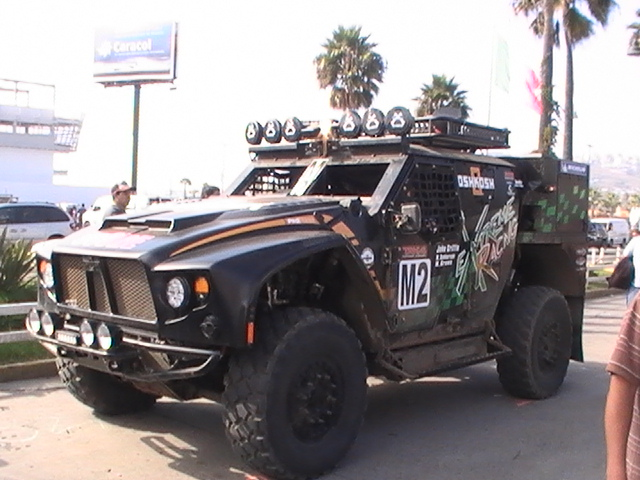
SCORE Class M-Truck race vehicle

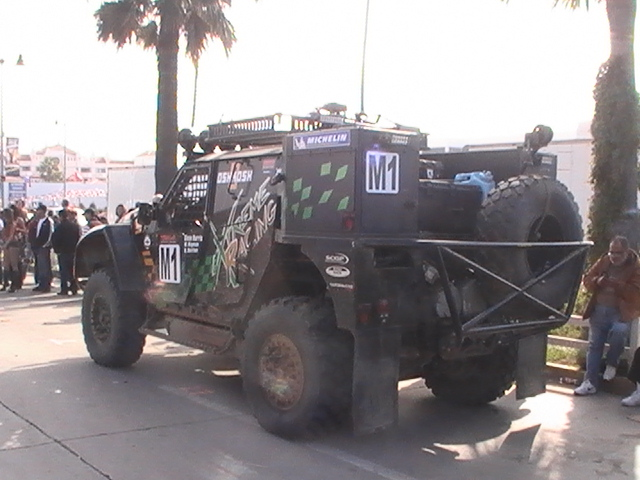
SCORE Class M-Truck race vehicle

SCORE Class M-Truck is a two or four-wheel drive medium utility vehicle that competes in the SCORE off-road race series races including the Baja 1000, Baja 500, Baja Sur 500, San Felipe 250, and the SCORE Desert Challenge.

== Vehicle description ==
Two or four-wheel drive medium utility vehicle with a minimum weight 12,000 pounds. Vehicles built from a two or four-wheel drive utility vehicle. Vehicle must be marketed utility vehicle. This class is an open-production class and all components are not restricted unless otherwise stated.

All vehicles in this class must comply with FMVSS and have an OEM VIN attached.

=== Engine ===
Manufacturer's body, engine, transmission, differentials, and chassis combinations must be retained.

=== Suspension ===
Minimum wheelbase 125 inches. Maximum track width 102 inches.

=== Body ===
Minimum weight 12,000 pounds. Must have a GVW (Gross Vehicle Weight) of 18,000 pounds minimum
