= Chad Ragland =

American race car driver

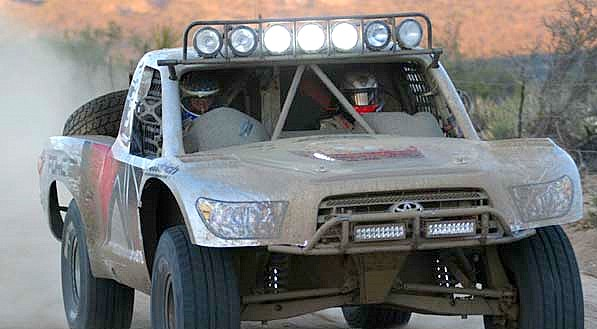
Ragland driving the TForce Motorsport Toyota Tundra in Baja California, 2007

Chad Ragland (November 27, 1970 – January 24, 2018 Phoenix, Arizona) was an American winning race car driver and the son of legendary off-road racer Larry Ragland.

Ragland first competed in the SCORE International off-road series in an unlimited class one buggy with Volkswagen factory driver, Mark Miller. In 2004, Ragland joined veteran racer Brian Collins and Collins Motorsports. It was here Ragland had his first success in the premier Trophy Truck class, leading the majority of the 2005 SCORE Baja 1000. Mechanical issues kept the victory out of reach and just off the podium with a fourth-place finish.

In 2007, Ragland was asked to join a brand new off-road team, called T Force Motorsports. Ragland was integral in the startup of the new team as well as being the lead driver for the team. To date, the team has earned podium finishes at the 2008 SCORE San Felipe 250 and Baja 1000

Most recently, Ragland competed in the SCORE International Laughlin Desert Challenge in 2010 and The Best in the Desert Parker 425 with past SCORE Trophy Truck Champion, BJ Baldwin for Baldwin Motorsports. Ragland died after a lengthy battle with Leukemia.

== Career highlights ==
- 2011 – 2nd Overall 2nd in Trophy Truck SNORE Mint 400 400
- 2011 – 2nd Overall 2nd in Trick Truck BITD Parker Blue Water Casino 425
- 2010 – 4th Overall 4th in Trophy Truck SCORE Baja 1000 / 3rd Overall 3rd in Class Trophy Truck SCORE Laughlin Desert Challenge Day 1 / 2nd Fastest Qualifier in Trophy Truck SNORE Mint 400
- 2008 – 3rd Overall 3rd in Trophy Truck SCORE Baja 1000 / 3rd Overall 3rd in Class Trophy Truck SCORE San Felipe 250
- 2006 – 4th Trophy Truck SCORE Baja 1000 with Brian Collins and Larry Ragland
- 2005 – 4th Trophy Truck SCORE Baja 1000
- 2002 – 1st Trophy Truck Parker 400 - SNORE & Whiplash
- 2001 – 1st Trophy Truck Rock to Rock - Whiplash

== Media ==
Ragland has been featured in several action sports films, most notably, Bajaflo2, Desert People 6, and Drive. He has also been used for interviews by NBC on their last four programs for the SCORE Baja 500 and 1000. Ragland was a natural in front of the camera. He has also been featured on SPEED's coverage of the Best in the Desert Mint 400 off road race.

In addition to being a top athlete in the off-road racing world, Ragland also filmed several commercials for General Tire and Continental Tire. He also provided on air hosting duties for the Ultra4 Racing King of the Hammers and for Polaris Industries.

== Education and other projects ==
Ragland attended Brophy College Preparatory and Northern Arizona University graduating with a B.S. in Economics. Upon graduating, Ragland joined the team at Conejo Bicycles and worked his way up to owning and running the company from 1994–1997. Shortly after the sale, Ragland co-founded Your Source Financial in Phoeniz, AZ and currently is a private contractor for them.

== Personal life ==
Ragland was a fanatical cyclist and motorcycle rider. When he was not racing behind the wheel, he could be found on the roads and trails around his home in Carlsbad, California.

"Racing is in my blood. I don’t know if it is the desire to win or just the thrill of competition, but everything I enjoy seems to involve racing."
