= Larry Roeseler =

American motorcycle racer

Larry Roeseler is an American professional off-road racer. He is notable for having won the prestigious Baja 1000 desert race a record 13 times, the most of any competitor since the race's inception in 1967. His victories made him one of the most accomplished multi-discipline desert racers in off-road racing history.

Roeseler began his racing career on two wheels, racing off-road motorcycles to numerous victories before switching to four wheels. He won the Baja 1000 race ten times on motorcycles then, won the event three more times driving in the open-wheel and trophy truck classes for a record 13 Overall Baja 1000 Wins. He was also a successful motorcycle enduro competitor, winning ten gold medals in the International Six Days Enduro. Roeseler was inducted into the AMA Motorcycle Hall of Fame in 1999 and, the Off-road Motorsports Hall of Fame in 2012.

== Off-road racing career ==
=== Motorcycle racing ===
Roeseler began his off-road racing career in the California desert racing a Harley-Davidson. He soon moved on Husqvarna motorcycles and became one of the top AMA desert racers competing in desert races including hare scrambles and Hare and Hound races. Roeseler won his first Baja 1000 in 1976 with teammate Mitch Mayes on a Husqvarna. Roeseler was adept at competing in both high speed desert racing as well as relatively slow enduro races. He represented the United States at the International Six Days Enduro which, is a form of off-road motorcycle Olympics and the oldest annual competition sanctioned by the FIM dating back to 1913. Roeseler's riding skills took him to ten Gold Medals in ISDE competition.

He became a member of the Kawasaki factory racing team in 1987. He won the AMA National Enduro Reliability Series in 1990. Roeseler retired from motorcycle racing in 1994 at the age of 37.

=== Four-wheel racing ===
In 2007, Roeseler drove the Terrible Herbst Truggy to win the 2007 Baja 250. In 2008, Roeseler joined Larry Ragland and Rhys Millen on the Norman Motorsports team as co-driver of Trophy Truck No. 8. In September 2008, Roeseler won his second Trophy Truck race with a 10-minute lead for the Overall Win at the Primm 300 driving the first three of four laps in the No. 8 Norman Motorsports Ford F-150 race truck, capturing the overall and SCORE Trophy Truck victory at the 13th Annual SCORE Terrible's Primm 300 desert race.

As of 2015 in SCORE International competition, Roeseler has 39 class wins, 26 overall wins, 11 overall Baja 500 wins, and a record 13 overall Baja 1000 wins, the most of all time.

== Film Credits ==
Roeseler was featured in Dana Brown's 2004 Film of the Baja 1000, 'Dust to Glory'.
