= Corky McMillin =

American off-road desert racer and land developer (1929–2005)

Corky McMillin

Macey L. "Corky" McMillin Jr. (January 14, 1929 – September 22, 2005) was an American off-road desert racer, philanthropist and land developer.

== Biography ==
When he was 14, McMillin and his family moved from a small Missouri town to Chula Vista, California. He graduated from Sweetwater High School in nearby National City. He started a small construction company in Bonita, California in 1960, with his wife, Vonnie, who handled accounting duties. While McMillin was busy building houses, his passion was taking his family to the Imperial Sand Dunes on the weekends. As sons Mark and Scott got older, McMillin decided to try his hand at off-road racing.

McMillin's first venture into a competitive event came at the 1976 Baja 1000 with his son, Mark. Although the father-son team did not finish that first race, McMillin kept at it, and his first win came in the 1979 Baja 1000. He went on to win many more races, including the San Felipe 250, Baja 500, Baja 1000, Parker 400, and Fireworks 250, most of them multiple times. Over the years, McMillin won three SCORE Points Championships and on two occasions, won overall titles at both the San Felipe 250 and the Baja 500.

As the McMillin Companies continued to prosper, McMillin expanded into different markets, including Liberty Station, a 361-acre (1.46 km^{2}) conversion project on the site of the former San Diego Naval Training Center. He eventually became one of the largest private developers in the country. The Corky McMillin Companies donated $1.5 million to enhance the real estate program at San Diego State University's College of Business Administration. Through Partners in Education, McMillin contributed to anti-drug programs in the Poway Unified School District.

McMillin died at the age of 76 less than two weeks after he had a heart attack while racing in his final desert race, the SCORE Las Vegas Primm 300. He has eight grandchildren. In 2000, because of his contributions to the community, an elementary school in Chula Vista was named after him. Vonnie McMillin died on August 30, 2016, after an extended battle with Parkinson's disease.

While his sons continue to run the family business — The Corky McMillin Companies — his daughter, Laurie Ann, an interior designer who is also on the board of directors of the family's corporation, decorates the company's model homes.

== Career awards ==
McMillin is a 2006 inductee in the Off-Road Motorsports Hall of Fame. He was awarded the City of Hope Spirit of Life Award in 1985.
