= Larry Ragland =

American professional offroad racing competitor

Larry Ragland (born December 22, 1943) is an American professional offroad racing competitor and 5 time SCORE International Baja 1000 Trophy Truck overall winner. "Lightning" Larry Ragland is the second most winning driver in desert racing's history and a Trophy Truck expert.

== Personal life ==
Larry Ragland was born December 22, 1943. He had a son named Chad who died after a lengthy battle with leukemia. Larry currently lives in Cave Creek, Arizona.

== Racing career ==
=== 1980s ===
- 1981 1st career race win at Parker 400.
- 1981 1st SCORE Baja 500 win, and 1st SCORE San Felipe 250 win (class and overall).
- 1982 SCORE Baja 500, winner (class and overall).
- 1983 Barstow Desert Classic, and SCORE San Felipe 250 winner (class and overall).
- 1983 SCORE Class 1 championship.
- 1984 SCORE Baja 500 and Frontier 500 (class and overall).
- 1984 2nd consecutive SCORE Class 1 championship.
- 1985 Frontier 500 2nd consecutive win (class and overall).
- 1986 Mint 400 winner (class and overall).
- 1987 Riverside Off-Road World Championships (short course) winner.
- 1988 Parker 400, Mint 400, Nevada 500 and consecutive Riverside Off-Road World Championships (short course) champion (class and overall).
- 1988 SCORE Class 7 championship.
- 1989 Barstow Fireworks 250 winner.

=== 1990s ===
- 1990 Mid-Winter Championships, Phoenix World Championships, and the Parker 400 winner (class and overall).
- 1991 SCORE Baja 500, Parker 400, SCORE San Felipe 250, Nevada 500, and Gold Coast 300 winner.
- 1991 1st SCORE Baja 1000 win (class 8 and overall).
- 1991 SCORE Heavy Metal and SCORE Class 8 championships.
- 1992 Mint 400 and Nevada 500 winner (class and overall).
- 1992 2nd consecutive SCORE Heavy Metal and SCORE Class 8 championships.
- 1993 Gold Coast 300 (class and overall).
- 1995 San Felipe 250 winner (class and overall).
- 1995 SCORE Baja 1000 winner (2nd career)(class and overall).
- 1996 SCORE Baja 1000 winner (3rd career)(2nd straight)(class and overall).
- 1997 Pikes Peak Rookie of the Year.
- 1997 SCORE Baja 1000 winner (4th career)(3rd straight)(class and overall).
- 1998 Atlas Rally and Pikes Peak Super Stock Truck-Hill Climb winner.
- 1999 Pikes Peak Overall Fastest Vehicle up the Mountain - honors.
- 1999 Pikes Peak Super Stock Truck-Hill Climb - winner (class and overall).
- 1999 SCORE Baja 1000 winner (5th career)(class and overall).

=== 2000s ===
- 2000 SCORE Baja 500 and Parker 400 - winner (class and overall).
- 2002 SCORE Baja 500 - winner (class).
- 2005 SCORE Primm 300, BITD Terrible's Town 250, SNORE Buffalo Bills 400, and BITD Nevada 1000 - winner (class and overall).
- 2006 BITD Vegas-to-Reno - winner (class and overall).
- 2006 SCORE Baja 500 - winner (class and overall).
- 2007 SCORE Baja 500 - winner (class and overall).
- 2008 SCORE Baja 1000 - 3rd overall with son, Chad Ragland

== Norman Motorsports ==
In 2008 Ragland joined Larry Roeseler and Rhys Millen on the Norman Motorsports team as co-driver of Trophy Truck #8.

== Hall of Fame ==
In 2016, Ragland was inducted in the Off-Road Motorsports Hall of Fame.

== Video Game Credits ==
Ragland was featured in the 2001 video game 'Larry Ragland's 4x4 Challenge'.
