= Bruce Ogilvie (motorcyclist) =

American motorcycle racer

- Born: April 4, 1953; Riverside, California, U.S.
- Died: April 13, 2009 (aged 56)
- Occupations: Off-road motorcycle racer, racing manager, test rider
- Awards: Motorcycle Hall of Fame (posthumous)

Bruce Ogilvie (April 4, 1953– April 13, 2009) was an American off-road motorcycle racer. He was a top American Motorcyclist Association (AMA) District 37 desert racer, winner of multiple Baja 500 and Baja 1000 races, and a long-time manager of American Honda’s off-road race team. Ogilvie was posthumously inducted into the AMA Motorcycle Hall of Fame in 2010.

== Background ==
Born April 4, 1953, in Riverside, California, to Donald (Don) and Charlene Ogilvie, Bruce Ogilvie's amateur career led him to become one of the greatest desert racers ever to spring from AMA District 37 in Southern California.

== Racing career ==
Ogilvie's Baja victories span over four decades. The first was a Baja 500 win in 1975, with another win in the 1000 later that year. He also competed in enduro events, winning a gold medal at the 1981 International Six Days Enduro. The International Six Day Trials, a form of off-road motorcycle Olympics, is the oldest annual competition sanctioned by the FIM dating back to 1913.

Ogilvie was the only man in history to win the Baja 1000 overall in four different decades, and he posted his last overall win in 2003 at the age of 51. He died on April 13, 2009, after a two-year battle with cancer.

Ogilvie was employed by American Honda beginning in 1984 where he served in many capacities over the years including, being in charge of Honda's off-road activities with motorcycle and ATV racing. Ogilvie was the lead developer of Honda CRF off-road race motorcycles. Prior to his death, he was the Senior Test Evaluator for Honda's Product Evaluation department.
