= SCORE Class 4 =

SCORE Class 4 is a limited four-wheel, single or two-seat vehicle class that competes in the SCORE off-road race series including the Baja 1000, Baja 500, San Felipe 250, Baja Sur 500 and the SCORE Desert Challenge. Class 4 was added in 2009.

This is an open class and all components will be considered open unless restricted by SCORE International.

== Vehicle description ==
Limited 4-wheel, single or two-seat vehicles. Limited 2.4-liter Ecotec sealed engine. Must use Delphi MEFI 4 or MEFI 5 ECU. Frame, suspension and appearance are similar to that of a Class 10 vehicle.

== Class requirements ==
=== Engine ===
Stock GM Ecotec 2.2-liter four-cylinder engine. Single seat vehicles are limited to 2.2 liter engines but two-seat vehicles are limited to 2.4 liter. 2.4 liter engines must use the cable controlled 2.2 liter throttle body. No fly by wire throttle bodies are permitted.

Engine must remain stock as delivered by the manufacture. Engine must be sealed by SCORE prior to being installed into vehicle. Must use stock Delphi MEFI ECU 4 or 5.

=== Suspension ===
Unlimited.

=== Body ===
No production bodied vehicles are allowed in this class.
