= Larry Ragland's 4x4 Challenge =

2001 video game

- Developer: Xpiral
- Publisher: Xicat Interactive
- Platform: Microsoft Windows
- Release: November 27, 2001
- Genre: Racing
- Modes: Single-player, multiplayer

Larry Ragland's 4x4 Challenge is a racing game developed by Spanish studio Xpiral and published by Xicat Interactive, and endorsed by the eponymous American off-road racing driver, Larry Ragland.

== Reception ==
Reception

Aggregate score
Aggregator	Score
Metacritic	51/100

Review scores
Publication	Score
Computer Games Magazine	1/5
GameSpot	4.9/10
GameSpy	66/100
GameZone	7.7/10
IGN	5/10

Larry Ragland's 4x4 Challenge received mixed reception by critics.
