= SCORE Stock Mini =

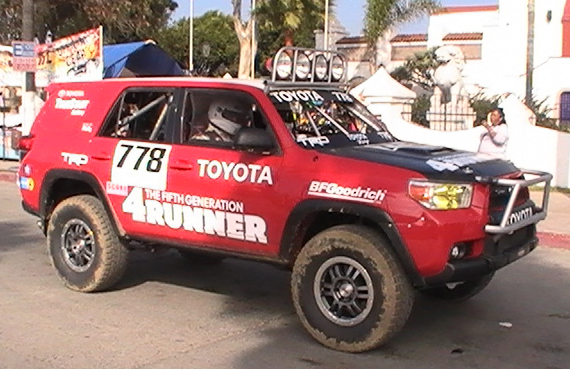
Ivan Stewart's SCORE Stock Mini at the start of the 2010 Baja 1000.

SCORE Class Stock Mini is a stock production class that competes in the SCORE off-road race series including the Baja 1000, Baja 500, Baja Sur 500, San Felipe 250 and the SCORE Desert Challenge.

The vehicle must have been series produced in quantities greater than 5000 over a 12-month period and be readily available to the general public in the U.S.A. Vehicle must be marketed as mini or mid-sized pickup or sport utility vehicle.

== Vehicle description ==
Stock Mini vehicles can be two-wheel or four-wheel drive, truck or SUV. Manufacturer's body, engine, transmission, differentials and chassis combinations must be retained.

== Class requirements ==
=== Engine ===
Any engine may be used, provided it is listed and delivered by the manufacturer. Displacement must be less than 4300cc in size and have no-more than six-cylinders. Additional modification limitations exist.

=== Suspension ===
Suspension is mostly stock with minor allowances to accommodate larger tires.

=== Body ===
Body must maintain the original shape, size, configuration and appearance. Additional stock limitations exist for this class.
