= Jonah Street =

American motorcycle racer

Jonah Street is a retired American off-road rally racing motorcycle rider from Ellensburg, Washington. He has competed in numerous rally events worldwide including the Dakar Rally, Baja 1000, Baja 500 and Rally Mongolia. Street has raced on six continents.

Typically known for riding Honda motorcycles in the Baja 500 during his early wins and KTM motorcycles during his prior entries in the Dakar Rally, it was announced that Street would team up with GYTR (Genuine Yamaha Technology Racing) and would be riding a rally-prepared Yamaha WR450F in the 2011 Dakar Rally. In 2016, he served as a navigator in the Dakar Rally for driver Sheldon Creed.

== Honors ==
Year	Tournament or trophy	Class	Achievement
2010	Rally Mongolia	Motorbikes	First Place
2010	Dakar Rally	Motorbikes	Seventh Place
2009	Dakar Rally	Motorbikes	Stage 5, First Place
2006	SCORE Baja 500	Motorbikes	First in Class, Third Overall
2006	Dakar Rally	Motorbikes	17th Place
2001	SCORE Series Championship	Motorbikes	First Place
2001	Best in the Desert Series Championship	Motorbikes	First Place
2001	SCORE Baja 1000	Motorbikes	Second Place
2001	SCORE Baja 500	Motorbikes	First Place
2000	SCORE Baja 500	Motorbikes	First Place
1999	SCORE Baja 1000	Motorbikes	Second Place
1999	SCORE Baja 500	Motorbikes	First Place
