= SCORE Class 3 =

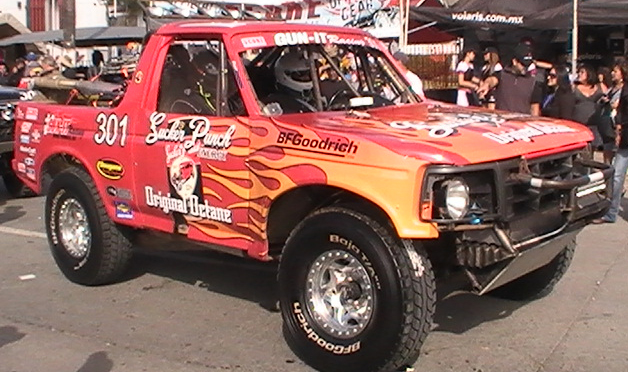
SCORE Class 3 race vehicle

SCORE Class 3 is production short wheelbase 4x4 class that competes in the SCORE off-road race series races including the Baja 1000, Baja 500, San Felipe 250, Baja Sur 500 and the SCORE Desert Challenge.

== Vehicle description ==
Vehicles must be a four-wheel drive vehicle capable of being driven through all four wheels. Vehicles are typically Jeep, Ford Bronco, Kia Sportage or Chevrolet Trailblazer.

No pickup trucks are allowed in this class. Minimum vehicle weight is 3500 lbs.
