= SCORE Class 11 =

Stock production Volkswagen Beetle class

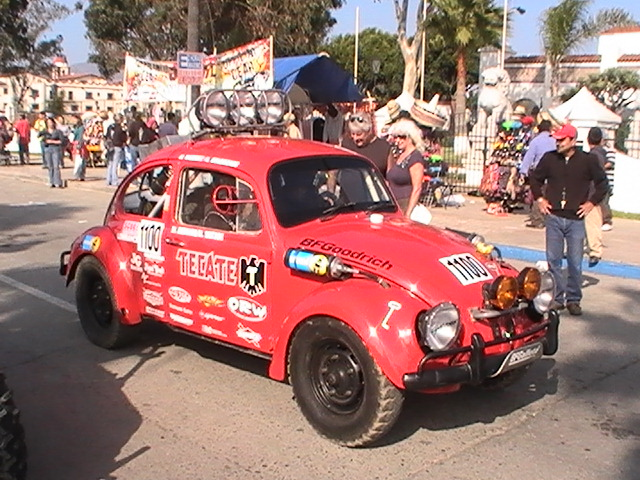
Eric Solorzano's SCORE Class 11 car at the 2010 Baja 1000

SCORE Class 11 is a stock production Volkswagen Beetle class that competes in the SCORE off-road race series, including the Baja 1000, Baja 500, Baja Sur 500, San Felipe 250 and the SCORE Desert Challenge. Class 11 is the most grueling of all off-road race vehicles as they are pure stock with modifications limited to only safety reinforcement and ground clearance. Class 11 repeat champion Eric Solórzano was featured in Dust to Glory, a documentary on the 2003 Baja 1000.

== Vehicle description ==
Vehicles must be a stock Volkswagen Type 1 sedan.

== Class requirements ==
=== Safety ===
A full roll cage must be installed following SCORE International safety requirements by weight of vehicle.

Any manufacturer of seats may be used. 5 point seat belts must be used. For SCORE racing a fuel cell type gas tank must be used. Race fuel cells may also be used in any location. Battery must be relocated. Windshield and other windows are optional. Window nets must be installed in passenger and driver windows. two headlights, two tail/brake lights, reverse light, amber light and blue light must be installed.

=== Brakes ===
Brakes are OPEN as long as they are original stock concept. Any manufacture stock master cylinder is allowed. Disc and drum brakes are allowed. use of 5-lug wheels is allowed for use with disc brakes. Any combination of VW master and wheel cylinders is allowed. Dual master cylinders allowed. Emergency brake is optional but if removed the resulting opening must be covered.

=== Engine ===
Engine must utilize VW series Type 1, 1600cc, U.S. model sedan and components and dimensions. Maximum 1600cc as delivered from the factory. Additional modification limitations exist. Pistons, stock 3 ring. Heads must be stock single or dual port heads 40mm. Unlimited compression, race gas OK. Stock carburetor 30 PICT 1,2 or 3.

Class 11 vehicles typically have 60-80 horsepower. Single Carburated, dual or single port. Electronic ignitions are allowed. No dry sumps. Larger oil pumps may be installed, and external coolers as well.

=== Suspension ===
Suspension is stock with minor allowances to increase ground clearance and strength. Front torsion housing may be cut and rotated, torsion bars are open and may be of any origin. Front Shocks must be 2" of less in stock location. One shock per wheel. Rear shocks must be 18" eye to eye, and may be relocated, but must bolt directly to rear trailing arm or swing axle. Bypass shocks are not allowed. No hydraulic bump stops. External reservoirs are allowed. Rear torsion adjuster may be installed, and any torsion bar may be used.

=== Body ===
Body must maintain the original shape, size, configuration, and appearance. Type 1 bodies only allowed. Additional stock limitations exist for this class. No super beetles.

=== Transmission ===
Type 1 four-speed transaxle only. Must use stock gears, differential is open, must run a 4.12 ring and pinion.

== Notable race teams ==
- CBCFS Racing - 1116 - Paul Nauleau
- Desert Dingo Racing - 1107 - Jim Graham
- Tecate - 1111 - Eric Solórzano
- Johnson Racing 1100 in SNORE
- Other Level Racing 1180 in SNORE
- Sergio EL COYOTE, Porfirio EL INDIO Gutierrez
- Team H12:One Racing - 1121 - Dennis Hollenbeck Chairez
- Project Baja - 1137 - Matt Fisher/Josh McGuckin
- Mooch Racing - 1156 - Arthur Penner
- ORS Racing - 1152 - Hector Maymes
- Robalonches Racing - 1113 - Mario Vasquez
- C11J Motorsports - 1189 - Joey Smith/Audra Smith aka Class 11 Junkies
- Peoples racing - 1118 - Cisco Bio
