= SCORE Class 6 =

SCORE Class 6 in off-road racing is an open production unlimited class that competes in the SCORE off-road race series including the Baja 1000, Baja 500, Baja Sur 500, San Felipe 250 and the SCORE Desert Challenge. Unlimited 4 wheel vehicles. Class 6 was added in 2009.

== Vehicle description ==
Unlimited four-wheel vehicles. Vehicles must have a production appearing Utility or Sports Utility body. Ford Ranger dominated the class Lexus LX series and Toyota 4runner are previous participants.

== Class requirements ==
=== Engine ===
Engine may be of any manufacture as that of the body. Engine limited to a maximum of six cylinders.

=== Suspension ===
Track width must not exceed 87 inches as measured outside of tire to outside of tire.

=== Body ===
Must maintain a production appearing body. Stock appearing grill and headlight openings must be retained. Body subject to SCORE approval.
