= SCORE Class 5-1600 =

SCORE Class 5-1600 is open wheel limited Baja Bug class that competes in the SCORE off-road race series races including the Baja 1000, Baja 500, Baja Sur 500, San Felipe 250, and the SCORE Desert Challenge.

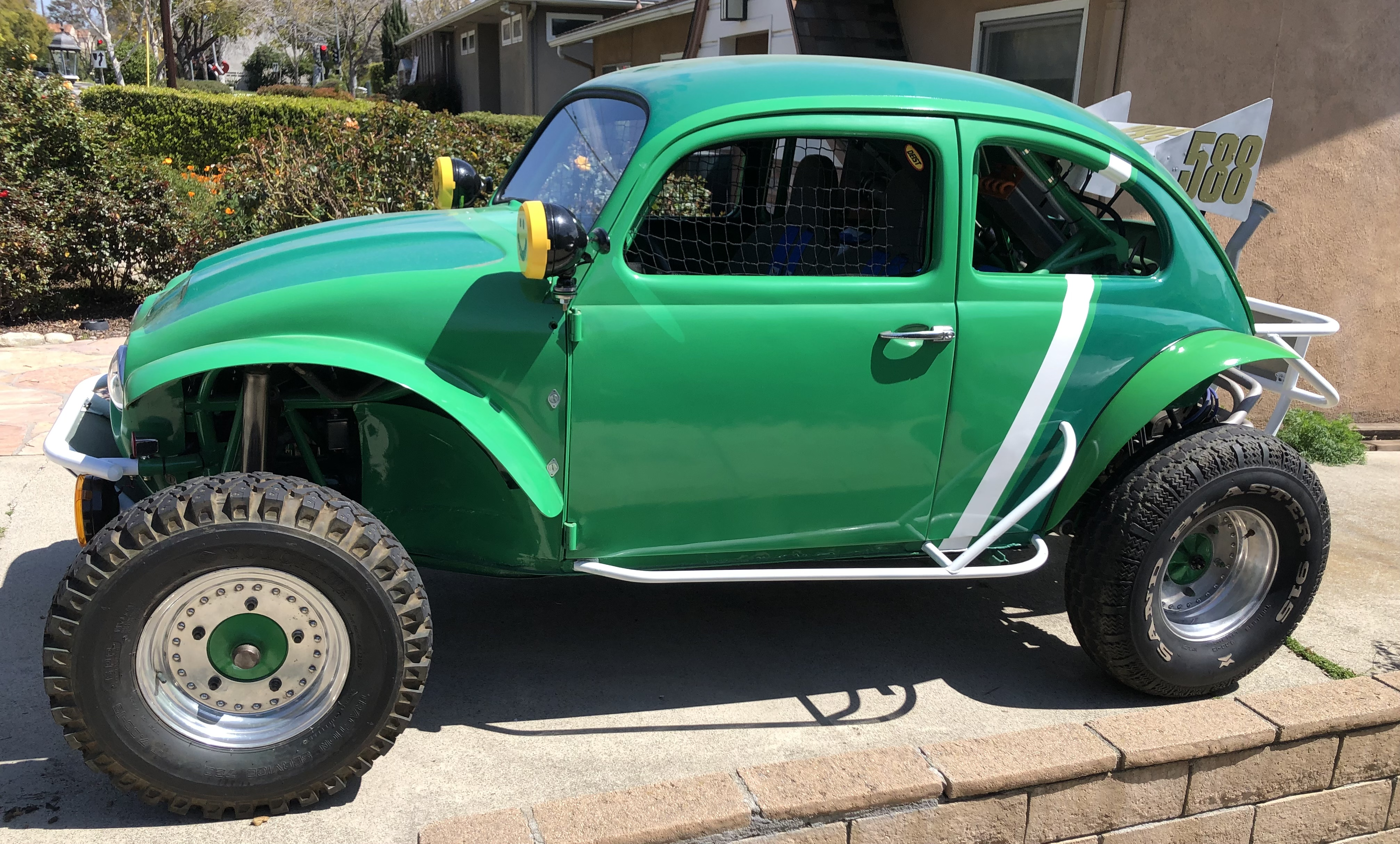
Traditional 5/1600 race car

== Vehicle description ==
Vehicle must be a VW Sedan Type 1 Hardtop or sunroof as delivered from the factory. Vehicle must have the external appearance of a "Baja Bug".

No Convertibles, Super Beetles, 181 Safari, Porsche 900 series, or Karmann Ghia are included in this class.

== Class requirements ==
=== Engine ===
Engine must utilize Volkswagen series type 1, 1600cc, US model sedan components and dimensions. Displacement is limited to 1600cc.

=== Suspension ===
Front suspension must be either Volkswagen Type 1, 181 ball joint or link pin only. Rear suspension is based on Volkswagen Type 1 independent rear suspension or swing axle.

=== Body ===
Vehicles must have an external appearance of a Baja Bug. Original wheelbase must be maintained.

== Notable race teams ==
- Vikingos
- Yolo Racing - Erich Reisen, Ross Burden, Ted Balkie
- GONZO RACING Trevor Anderson, Mark Anderson
- BASECAMP OFF-ROAD Matt Barnes, Todd Baxter, John Bosch, Trevor Anderson, Brian Schrom, Andy May

Crouchenvironmental.com - Greg Crouch, Kay Crouch, with Racer Services (Paul Mischel).

- Borrachos Motorsports - Hector Hurtado, Sergio Lopez, Fernando Flores, Omar Vega, Fernando Sanchez, Oscar Fregoso
