= San Felipe 250 =

Mexican off-road motorsport race

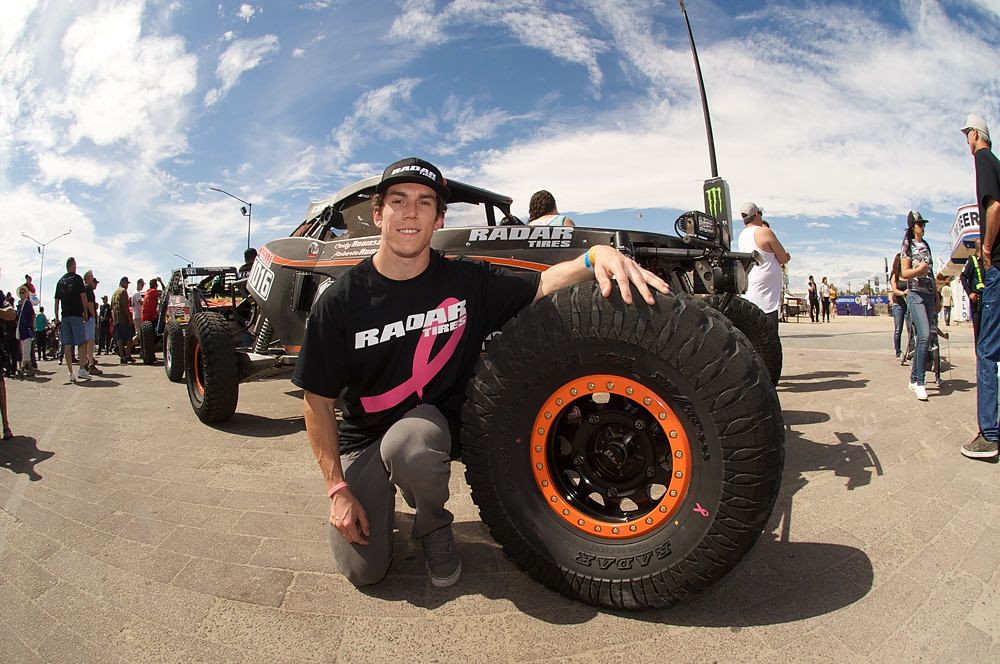
Cody Robinson, Class 10 winner in 2014

The Baja 250, initially called the Mexicali 300/250 and historically the San Felipe 250, is a 250-mile Mexican desert race that takes place near Mexicali on the Baja California Peninsula. It was first held in 1978 and is sanctioned by SCORE International. The event includes various types of vehicle classes such as small and large bore motorcycles, stock VW, production vehicles, buggies, trucks, and custom fabricated race vehicles. The course has remained relatively the same over the years with the majority of events being a loop race starting and finishing in its host city.

The race began as the Mexicali 300 in 1978 as a replacement for the Parker 400, which SCORE was unable to secure a Bureau of Land Management permit for. It was shortened to 250 miles a year later and ran until 1981. Due to safety concerns involving the growing population in Mexicali, SCORE moved the race to San Felipe for 1982.

The 2016 edition was the 30th anniversary of the race, occurring from February 25–28 in a loop format.

Disagreements between SCORE and ejido owners in the San Felipe area led to the race being moved in 2007 and 2027 to Ensenada and Mexicali, respectively. The latter included the race's renaming to the Baja 250.

== Current and past classes ==
=== Cars and trucks ===
- SCORE Trophy Truck: Open Production Unlimited Trucks.
- SCORE Class 1: Unlimited open-wheel single-or two-seaters.
- SCORE Class 1/2-1600: Limited suspension. open-wheel single-or two-seaters. (1600cc)
- SCORE Class 2: Limited 2.2 liter buggy.
- SCORE Class 3: Production short wheelbase 4x4 Jeeps.
- SCORE Class 4: Unlimited 2.2 liter open wheel.
- SCORE Class 5: Unlimited Baja Bugs.
- SCORE Class 5-1600: Baja Bugs. (1600cc)
- SCORE Class 6: V6 powered tube chassis trucks
- SCORE Class 7: Open mini trucks.
- SCORE Class 7S: Stock mini trucks. (3000cc)
- SCORE Class 7SX: Modified mini trucks. (4000cc)
- SCORE Class 8: Full-sized two-wheel drive trucks.
- SCORE Class 9: Short wheelbase, open-wheel. single-or two-seaters. (1600cc)
- SCORE Class 10: Open-wheel single or two-seaters. (2000cc)
- SCORE Class 11: Stock VW Sedans. (1600cc)
- SCORE Lites Class 12: VW limited open-wheel. single seat (1776cc) or two-seaters (1835cc).
- SCORE Class 17: Production short wheelbase 4x4 Modified Jeeps.
- SCORE Stock Full: Stock full-sized trucks.
- SCORE Stock Mini: Stock mini trucks. (4300cc)
- SCORE Baja Challenge: Limited, identical open-wheel Baja touring cars.
- SCORE Sportsman Buggy:
- SCORE Sportsman Truck: Prerunner Trucks
- SCORE Sportsman UTV: 660cc, 4-wheel utility vehicle.
- ProTruck: Limited Production Trucks governed by the Baja ProTruck Off-Road Race Series

=== Motorcycles ===
- SCORE Class 20: 125cc or smaller two-stroke and 250cc or smaller four-stroke motorcycles.
- SCORE Class 21: 126cc to 250cc.
- SCORE Class 22: 250cc or more.
- SCORE Class 30: Riders over 30 years old.
- SCORE Class 40: Riders over 40 years old.
- SCORE Class 50: Riders over 50 years old.
- SCORE Class 60: Riders over 60 years old.

=== ATVs ===
- SCORE Class 24: 250cc or less.
- SCORE Class 25: 251cc or more.

== Overall winners ==
| | Cars & Trucks | | | Motorcycle | | |
| Year | Drivers | Vehicle | Class | Riders | Vehicle | Class |
|---|---|---|---|---|---|---|
| 1982 | Dan Cornwell | Chenowth VW | 1 | Bob Balentine | Honda XR500 | 22 |
| 1983 | Corky McMillin, Scott McMillin | Chenowth Porsche | 2 | Jack Johnson | Honda XR500 | 22 |
| 1984 | Corky McMillin, Scott McMillin | Chenowth Porsche | 2 | Dan Smith, Dan Ashcraft | Husqvarna CR500 | 22 |
| 1990 | Brian Collins, Jack Johnson | Chenowth VW | 1 | Dan Smith, Danny Hamel | KTM | 22 |
| 1991 | Larry Ragland | Chevy C1500 | 8 | Larry Roeseler, Ted Hunnicut Jr | Kawasaki KX500 | 22 |
| 1992 | Bob Richey, Boyd Cox | Raceco Porsche | 1 | Larry Roeseler, Ted Hunnicut Jr | Kawasaki KX500 | 22 |
| 1993 | Scott Douglas | Ford Ranger | 7 | Danny Hamel | Kawasaki KX500 | 22 |
| 1994 | Ivan Stewart | Toyota SR5 | TT | Danny Hamel | Kawasaki KX500 | 22 |
| 1995 | Larry Ragland | Chevy C1500 | TT | Danny Hamel, Craig Smith | Kawasaki KX500 | 22 |
| 1996 | Robby Gordon | Ford F-150 | TT | Paul Krause, Greg Zitterkopf | Kawasaki KX500 | 22 |
| 1997 | Curt LeDuc | Jeep Grand Cherokee | TT | Tim Staab | Honda XR650 | 22 |
| 1998 | Mark Post, Jerry Whelchel | Riviera Chevy | 1 | Johnny Campbell, Tim Staab | Honda XR650 | 22 |
| 1999 | Ed Herbst, Tim Herbst | Ford F-150 | TT | Johnny Campbell, Cole Marshall | Honda XR650 | 22 |
| 2000 | Ed Herbst, Tim Herbst | Ford F-150 | TT | Johnny Campbell, Tim Staab | Honda XR650 | 22 |
| 2001 | Ed Herbst, Tim Herbst | Ford F-150 | TT | Steve Hengeveld, Jonah Street | Honda XR650R | 22 |
| 2002 | Dan Smith, David Ashley | Ford F-150 | TT | Steve Hengeveld, Johnny Campbell | Honda XR650R | 22 |
| 2003 | Gus Vildósola, Rob MacCachren | Ford F-150 | TT | Steve Hengeveld, Johnny Campbell | Honda XR650R | 22 |
| 2004 | Mark Post, Jerry Whelchel | Ford F-150 | TT | Steve Hengeveld, Johnny Campbell | Honda XR650R | 22 |
| 2005 | Andy McMillin, Scott McMillin | Jimco Chevy | 1 | Chris Blais, Andy Grider, Quinn Cody | KTM MXC525 | 22 |
| 2006 | Garron Cadiente | Ford F-150 | TT | Robby Bell, Kendall Norman | Honda CRF450X | 22 |
| 2007 | Mark Post, Rob MacCachren | Ford F-150 | TT | Robby Bell, Kendall Norman | Honda CRF450X | 22 |
| 2008 | Brian Collins | Dodge Ram 1500 | TT | Robby Bell, Johnny Campbell | Honda CRF450X | 22 |
| 2009 | Brian Collins | Dodge Ram 1500 | TT | Kendall Norman, Timmy Weigand | Honda CRF450X | 22 |
| 2010 | Armin Schwarz, Martin Christensen | Jimco BMW | 1 | Colton Udall, Jeff Kargola | Honda CRF450X | 22 |
| 2011 | Rob MacCachren | Ford F-150 | TT | Colton Udall, Jeff Kargola | Honda CRF450X | 22 |
| 2012 | Rob MacCachren | Ford F-150 | TT | Kurt Caselli, Ivan Ramirez | KTM 450SX-F | 22 |
| 2013 | Gustavo Vildósola, Gus Vildosola Jr. | Ford Raptor | TT | Timmy Weigand, Colton Udall | Honda CRF450X | 22 |
| 2014 | Gus Vildósola Jr. | Ford Raptor | TT | Ricky Brabec, Shane Esposito, Max Eddy Jr. | Kawasaki KX450F | 22 |
| 2015 | Gus Vildósola Jr. | Ford Raptor | TT | Colton Udall | Honda CRF450X | 22 |
| 2016 | Billy Wilson | Jimco | TT | Colton Udall, Justin Jones | Honda CRF450X | 22 |
| 2017 | Rob MacCachren | Ford F-150 | TT | Mark Samuels, Ryan Penhall, Daymon Stokie | Honda CRF450X | 22 |
| 2018 | Rob MacCachren | Ford F-150 | TT | Justin Morgan, Mark Samuels | Honda CRF450X | 22 |
| 2019 | Andy McMillin | Chevrolet 1500 | TT | Justin Morgan, Mark Samuels, Justin Jones | Honda CRF450X | 22 |
| 2020 | Not held due to the COVID-19 pandemic | | | | | |
| 2021 | Larry Roeseler | Toyota Tundra | TT | Jason Alosi | Husqvarna FW501 | 22 |
| 2022 | Luke McMillin | Chevrolet 1500 | TT | Juan Carlos Salvatierra | KTM 450 SX-F | 22 |
| 2023 | Luke McMillin | Chevrolet 1500 | TT | Ciaran Naran | Husqvarna | 22 |
| 2024 | Alan Ampudia | Ford | TT | Arturo Salas | Honda | 22 |
| 2025 | Alan Ampudia | Ford | TT | Tyler Lynn | Honda | 22 |

== See also ==
- SCORE International
- Baja 500
- Baja 400
- Baja 1000
