= SCORE Class 7SX =

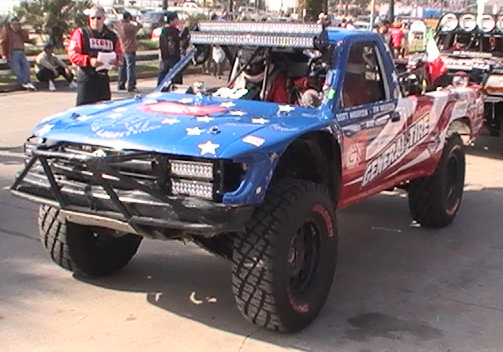
SCORE Class 7SX race vehicle at the 2010 Baja 1000

SCORE Class 7SX is a stock production Mini Pickup class that competes in the SCORE off-road race series races including the Baja 1000, Baja 500, Baja Sur 500, San Felipe 250, and the SCORE Desert Challenge.

This class is a stock production class and all components must remain stock except some modifications allowed.

== Vehicle Description ==
Built from a two or four-wheel drive mini or mid-sized pickup truck. Engine displacement may not exceed 4000cc.

Vehicles must have been series produced in quantities of at least 5000 units within a 12-month period and be readily available to the general public in the U.S.A. Vehicle must be marketed as mini or mid-sized pickups.

== Class Requirements ==
=== Engine ===
Engine must be of the same manufacturer, basic design with a maximum of 6 cylinders.

=== Suspension ===
Suspension must be of the same basic design and concept as originally produced. Suspension parts may be strengthened, reinforced or replaced.

=== Body ===
Body must maintain original shape, size, configuration and appearance. Vehicles must weight 3000lbs minimum.
