= SCORE Class 2 =

SCORE Class 2 is an unlimited four wheel single & two-seat vehicle class. The maximum engine size is a 3.5 liter, six cylinder forced air induction engine. Engines must have no more than six cylinders but forced induction is open to both turbo and superchargers. The minimum weight is 2,000 pounds.

The SCORE Class 2 competes in the SCORE International off-road racing series including the Baja 1000, Baja 500, Baja Sur 500, San Felipe 250 and the SCORE Desert Challenge. Class 2 was added in 2009.

== Vehicle description ==
Limited 4-wheel, two-seat open wheel vehicles. Limited 3.5-liter forced air induction engine, maximum 105 inch wheelbase. Minimum weight 2,000 pounds.

== Class requirements ==
=== Engine ===
3.5-liter forced induction powertrain. Engine must remain stock as delivered by the manufacture. Engine has to be sealed by SCORE prior to being installed into vehicle. Must use stock Delphi MEFI ECU.

=== Suspension ===
Front and rear suspension may be of any type or configuration. No mid-board or out-board CV joints allowed. Two shocks per wheel maximum. Maximum shock diameter 2.5 inches. No bypass (internal or external) shocks.

=== Body ===
Unlimited.
