= SCORE Lites =

SCORE Lites Class 12 is an open-wheel air-cooled Volkswagen motor class that competes in the SCORE off-road race series including the Baja 1000, Baja 500, Baja Sur 500, San Felipe 250 and the SCORE Desert Challenge. Four-wheel single and two-seat vehicles less than 1835cc in size. No production bodied vehicles are allowed in this class.

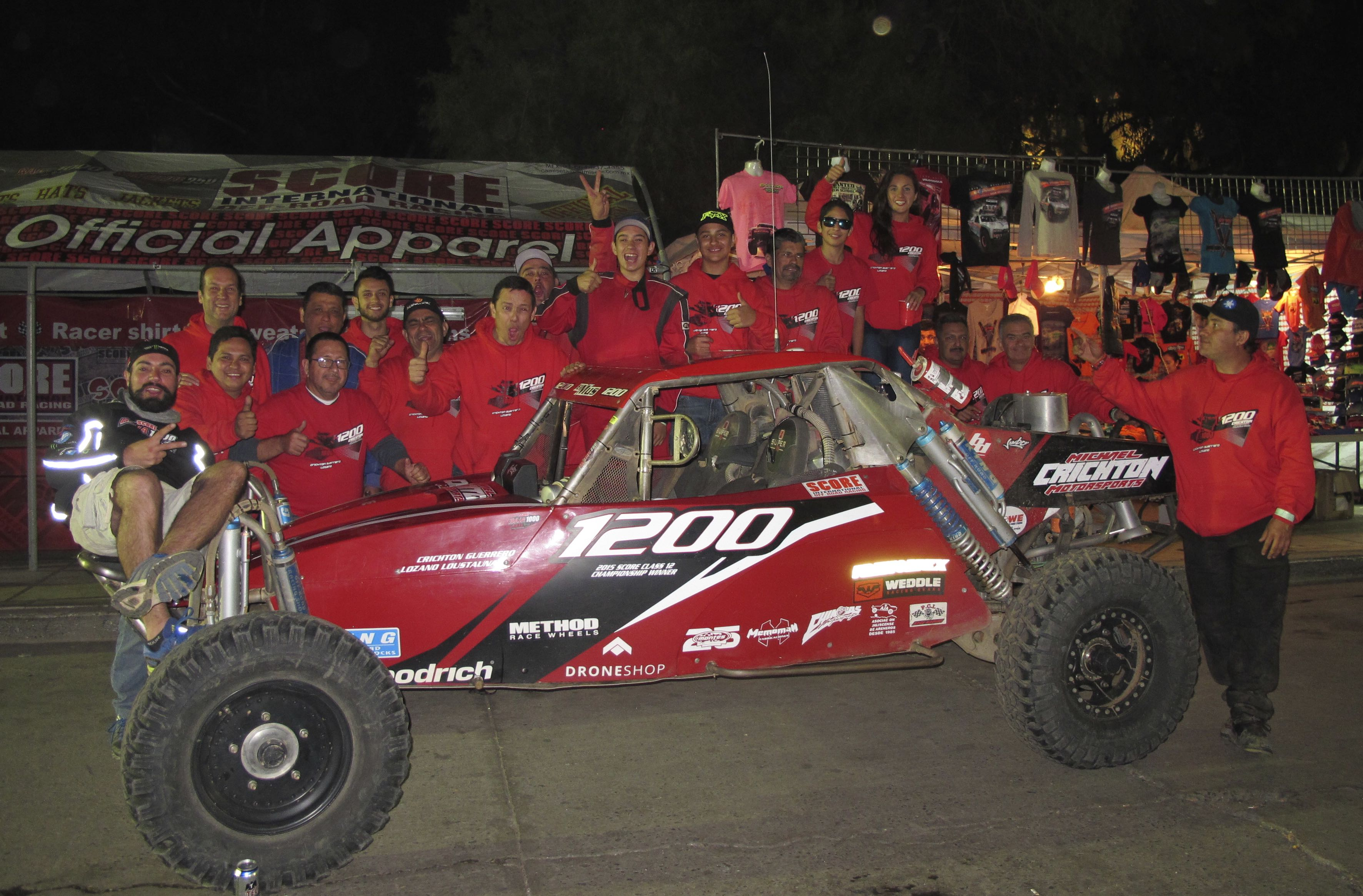
Michael Crichton Motorsports finishes in second place in the 2016 SCORE International Baja 1000, Ensenada, Baja California, Mexico

== Vehicle description ==
Class 12 vehicles are two-wheel drive and most feature a 4130 chromoly tube-frame chassis covered by a composite body. Vehicles must weigh a minimum of 1500 pounds.

== Class requirements ==
=== Engine ===
Engine must be Volkswagen Type 1 retaining 2 valves per cylinder. Single-seat vehicles must displace less than 1776cc, and two-seat vehicles must be less than 1835cc. One carburetor that retains a maximum of 2 venturis per carburetor with a size of less than 42mm.

=== Suspension ===
Limited to Volkswagen Type 1 configuration. Must be of the twin-beam trailing arm type. Beam is open. Trailing arms are open. Spindles are open.

=== Body ===
May not have a production-appearing utility or sport utility body.

== Notable race teams ==
- Michael Crichton Motorsports - 2015 SCORE Lites Class 12 Championship Winner, 2016 Baja 1000 2nd-place finish
- K.I.T. Racing - Rick St. John
- "Bingham Racing" - Bob Bingham
