= SCORE Class 10 =

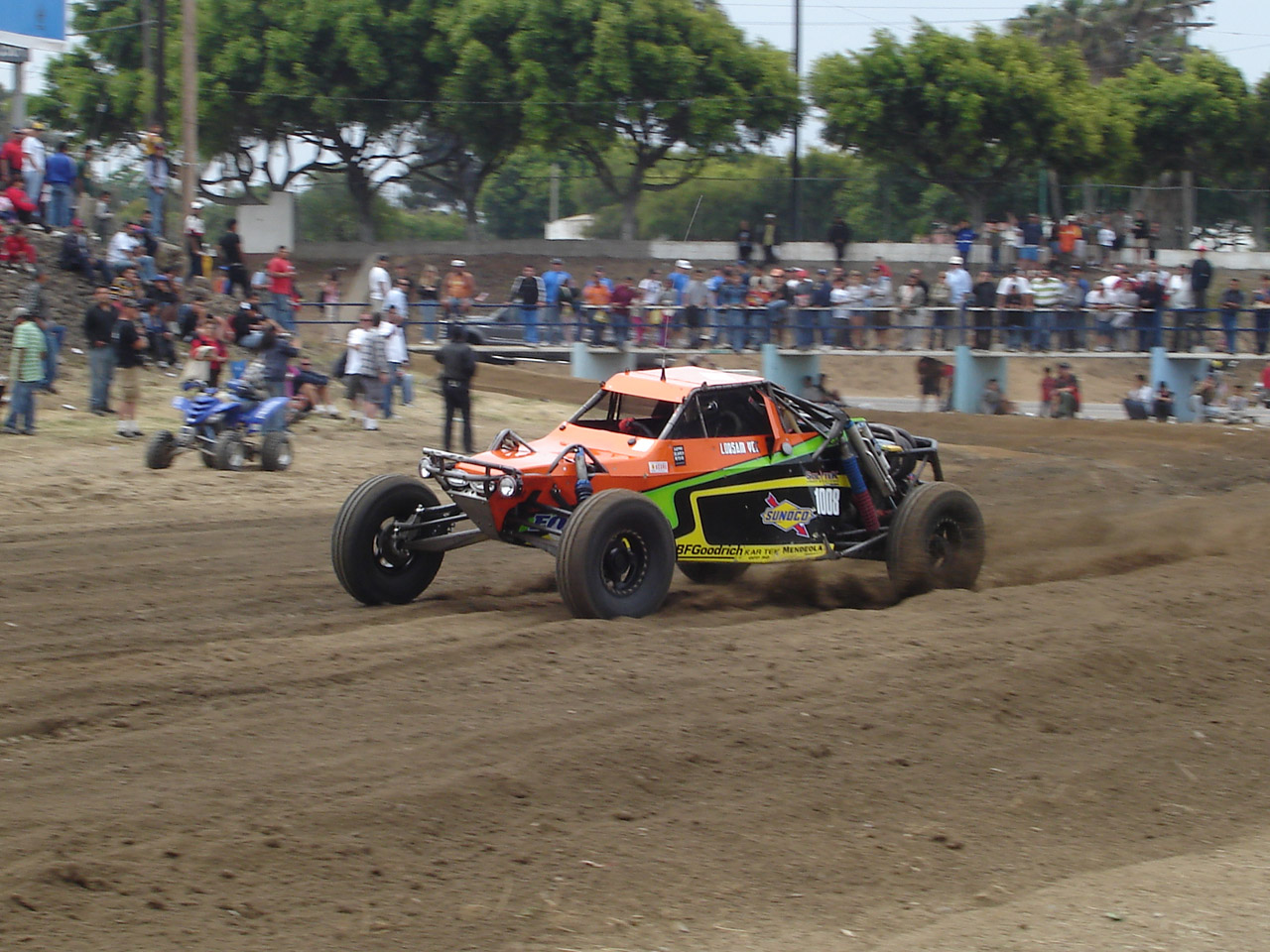
Lobsam Yee in a single seat

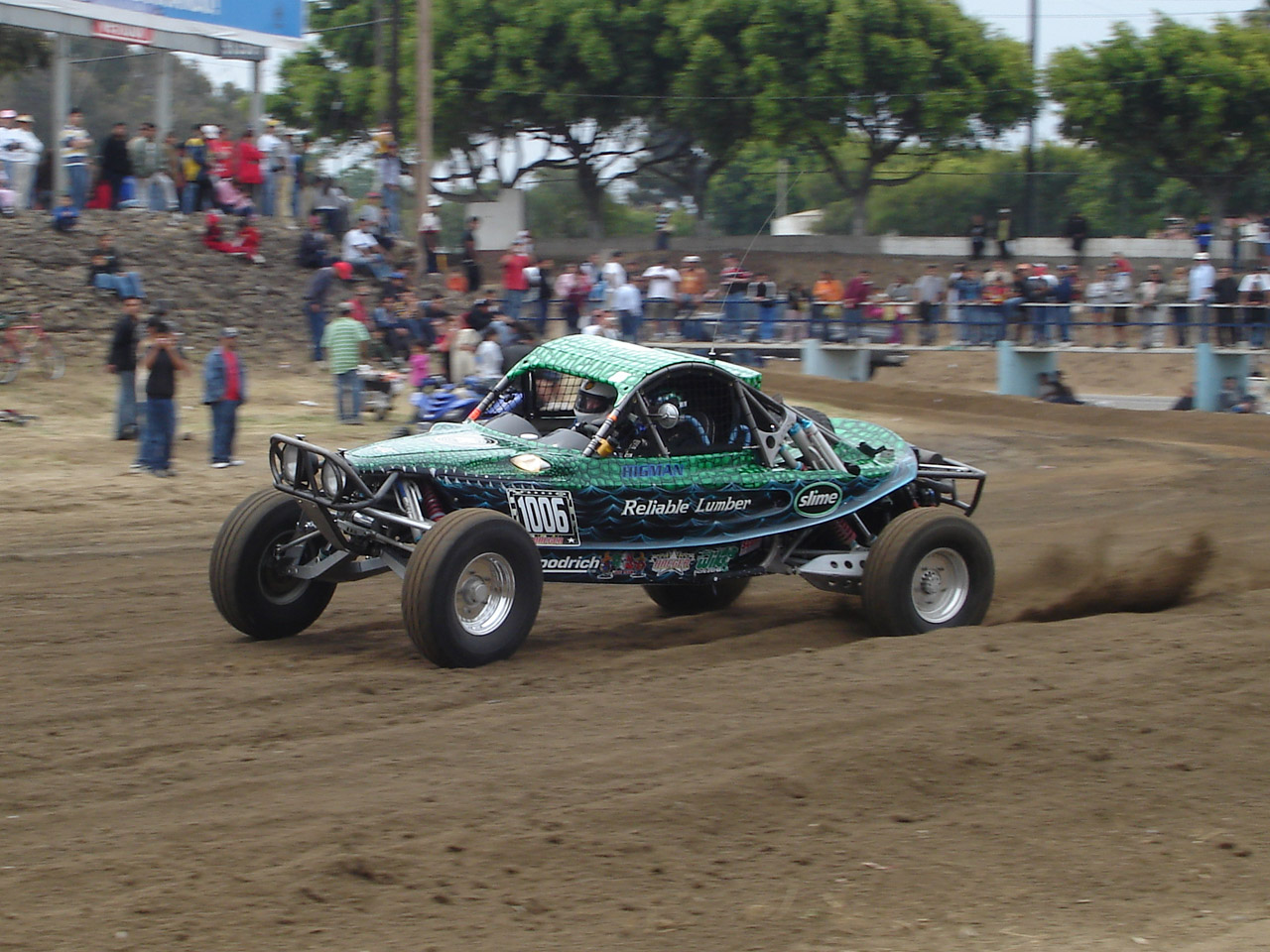
SCORE Class 10 "Croc"

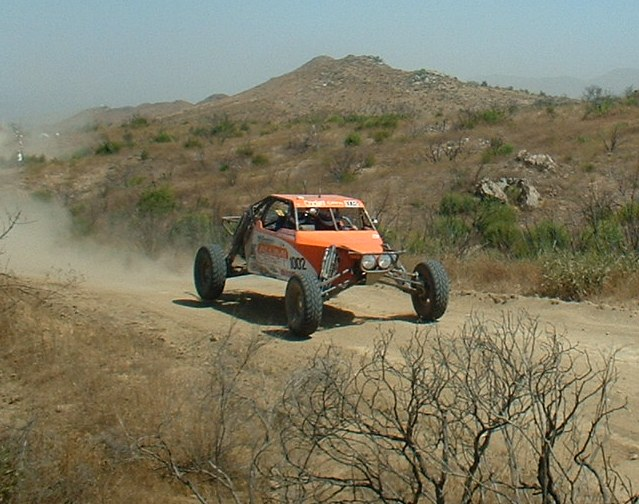
SCORE Class 10

SCORE Class 10 is an open-wheel limited motor class that competes in the SCORE off-road race series including the Baja 1000, Baja 500, Baja Sur 500, San Felipe 250 and the SCORE Desert Challenge. Four-wheel single and two-seat vehicles less than 2200cc in size. No production bodied vehicles are allowed in this class.

This class is an open class and all components will be considered open unless restricted.

== Vehicle description ==
Class 10 vehicles are most often 2-wheel drive, and most feature a 4130 chromoly tube-frame chassis covered by a composite body.

== Class requirements ==
=== Engine ===
Production engines produced in quantities greater than 5000 in the US and less than 2200cc in stock form with no more than four-cylinders. Single-seat vehicles are limited to 2200cc and two-seat vehicles must not displace more than 2500cc.

Most cars in this the class commonly use a 2.4 liter Ecotec engine from GM, but as of 2020 SCORE now allows use of a 2.5 liter version

=== Suspension ===
Unlimited.

=== Body ===
May not have a production appearing Utility or Sport Utility body.

== Notable race teams ==
- Lawrence Equipment Racing - Mikey Lawrence, Mark Lawrence, Steve Lawler, Clay Lawrence, Ian Egli
- Wide Open Baja Racing - A sister class 10 BC car from Wide Open was entered in the 2010 Baja 1000 in the open class and finished third overall.
