= SCORE Class 5 =

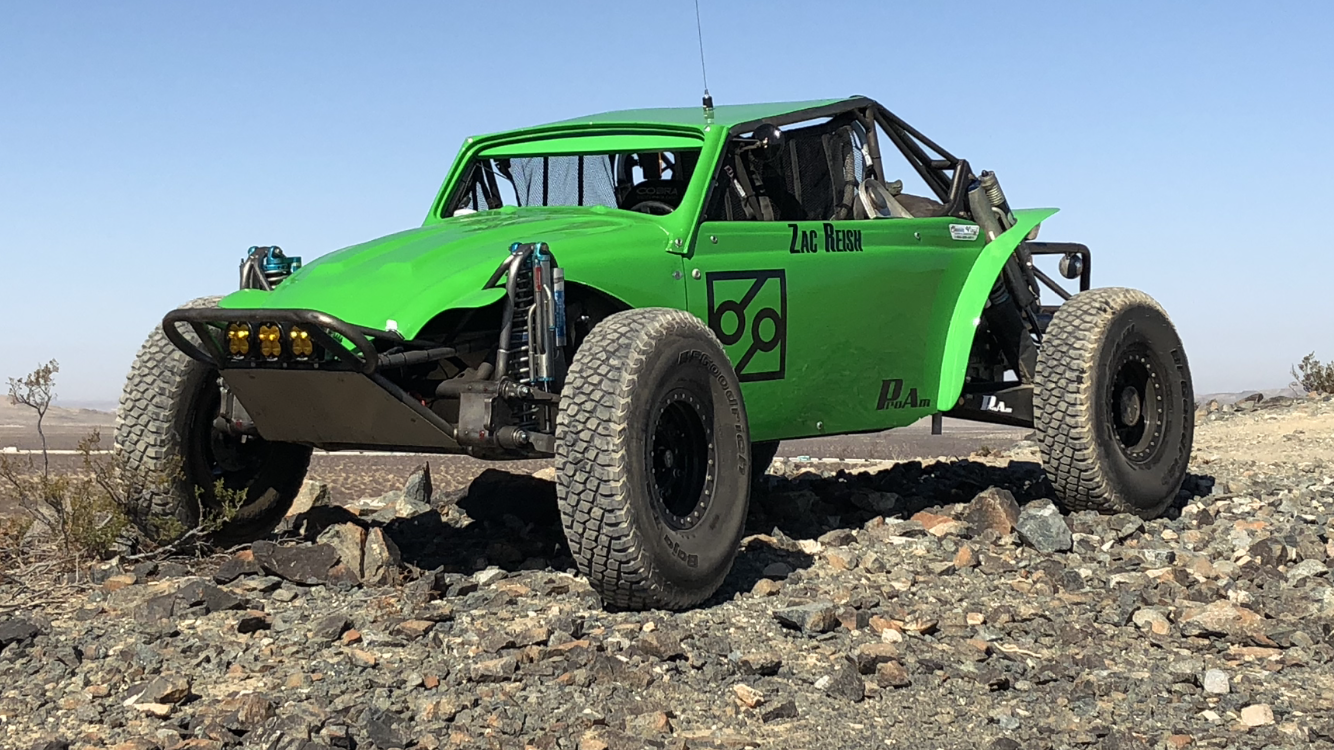
a modern SCORE Class 5 "Unlimited Baja bug" race car

SCORE Class 5 is described as "open wheel unlimited Baja Bug class that competes in the SCORE off-road race series races including the Baja 1000, Baja 500, San Felipe 250, Baja Sur 500 and the SCORE Desert Challenge.

The Volkswagen Beetle, or the "Bug" as it is nick-named, was one of the earliest types of vehicles to compete in desert racing, and the heritage of the Bug continues in several different classes. Class 5 was originally the class which allowed the most modification of a stock Volkswagen for racing, and this was given the "unlimited" designation. Other VW Beetle derived classes that are still in existence are the closely related Class 5/1600, which limits engines to the 1600cc VW air-cooled type, and Class 11, which is for stock VW Bugs.

== Vehicle Description ==
While the rules theoretically require that a Class 5 Unlimited vehicle must be built from a vintage VW Beetle (or one of the closely related stock vehicle originally made by Volkswagen or Porsche), in practice most of the current vehicles competing in this class have been constructed around a chrome-moly full tube chassis. The original VW bodywork, or in some cases fiberglass VW facsimile body panels, are then attached to the chassis. The rules require that the finished vehicle resemble a "Baja Bug". The Baja Bug is a much-loved icon of an earlier era of desert racing.

=== Engine ===
Originally, and for many years, engines were required to be 4 cylinder VW air or water cooled engines, other main manufacturer of these was Porsche, a company closely tied to Volkswagen through shared design and heritage. By the mid 2010s these large displacement air-cooled VW-type engines had become difficult and expensive to acquire and maintain, and a number of racers active in the class began the process of working to enlarge the list of available engines to keep the class alive and reduce costs for those competing it.

As a result of these discussions and negotiations a decision was made to allow any production based 4 cylinder engine of 2500cc or less to be used in the class. The rules still permit the use of unlimited displacement VW air-cooled type engines. The General Motors Ecotec 2400 and 2500cc engines are now the most common engine in the class, but engines from other makers are also being raced. A Class 5 Unlimited buggy built around a Subaru boxer 4-cylinder motor has been successful in a number of high-profile races, for instance.

=== Suspension ===
Front and rear suspension systems may be modified or replaced but are typically based on the original concept of the VW Bug, which is beam-type front suspension.

=== Body ===
Vehicles must have an external appearance of a Baja Bug. Wheelbase may be increased but not exceed 105" front to rear centreline. No center steering wheel is allowed. One or two seats may be used, position is optional within confines of the main cage but no center seating is allowed. Sheet metal front and rear firewalls are required and attached to the roll cage.

== Similar Classes in Other Race Organizations ==
NORRA is where it all started back in 1967. https://www.norra.com/index.php

While SCORE is the oldest and best known race promoter, there are several others organizations that promote and sanction desert or off-road racing in different geographical locations.

The "Best In The Desert" organization runs a series of point-to-point races in the Nevada desert. The unlimited Baja Bug class in BITD is called "Class 5000 Unlimited Baja" and has similar, though not identical, rules.

Many competitors compete in races sponsored by several sanctioning organizations in a single season, so builders often try to build cars that are legal in several race series, such as SCORE and BITD.

== Notable race teams ==
The Grinch - Zac Reish

Grabowski Brothers Racing

Swift Slip Motorsports

Precepts Racing

AGS Racing

Rehab Racing

The Black Bomber - Colepro Racing and Martin Bros Racing
