= SCORE Class 8 =

SCORE Class 8 is an off-road racing vehicle classification from SCORE International.

Vehicles built from a full-sized two or four-wheel drive utility or SUV vehicle. Vehicle must have been series produced in quantities of at least 5,000 units within a 12-month period and be readily available to the general public in the United States.

Class 8 vehicles cost around $100,000-300,000 with a cost per prep of $5,000-15,000.

Ford F-150 and Dodge Ram are examples of vehicle that compete in this class.

== Engine ==
Engine must be of the same manufacturer basic design and type and have the same number of cylinders as the one installed by the manufacturer. Any displacement engine may be used as long as the original block remains the same. Any make of automotive carburettor may be used but is restricted to one four-barrel. Stock fuel injection may be used too, provided it is the same as its street counterpart (i. e. direct injection on a Chevrolet Silverado since 2014).

Output is 550-650 BHP, with a top speed of 130 mph.

== Suspension ==
Suspension must retain original front end concept (i-beam, a-arm) and retain entire length of stock frame rails.

Wheel travel is 22-26" front and 26-32" rear.

== Body ==
Manufacturer's body, engine and chassis combination must be retained. Wheelbase must be +/- 2" of that of the stock vehicle. Total weight is 5,500-6,500 pounds.
