= SCORE Class 1/2-1600 =

SCORE Class 1/2-1600 is an Open Wheel restricted suspension, limited Volkswagen motor class that competes in the SCORE off-road race series including the Baja 1000, Baja 500, Baja Sur 500, San Felipe 250 and the SCORE Desert Challenge. No production bodied vehicles are allowed in this class.

== Vehicle description ==
Prototypes of this class have rear wheel drive, Volkswagen-based 2-wheel drive, and most feature a 4130 chrome tube-frame chassis covered by a fiberglass, aluminum or other composite body. Single or two-seat vehicles are limited to prototype engines with a link-pin front suspension system with independent front suspension and trailing arm rear suspensions.

This is a stock production class and all components must remain stock except for those modifications allowed.

== Class requirements ==
=== Engine ===
Engines must utilize Volkswagen series type 1, 1600cc, U.S. model sedan components and dimensions. Compression ratio and camshaft duration are unlimited. Stock dual-port cylinder heads cannot be ported or otherwise modified other than by flycutting for compression and 3-angle valve job. 1-piece stainless steel valves are allowed. Valve train is open for valve springs, retainers, locks, pushrods, and lifters; however, stock rocker arms must be utilized and their lift ratio must remain stock 1.1:1. Reciprocating assembly must be stock Volkswagen components but may be balanced. In the case of the connecting rods: one rod must remain untouched and the other 3 rods may be balanced to match. Pistons may be interchanged to forged, and engine cases may be machined for compression. Full flow oiling, oil galley plugs, case gussets, shuffle pinning, oil squirters, bronze lifter bores are all common case modifications. A top quality type 1, 1600cc engine will produce approximately 85 hp and withstand 5000-6000 rpm operation during the course of a full-length event, sometimes lasting over 25 hours.

=== Suspension ===
Front suspension is based on Volkswagen type 1 link pin style. Rear suspension is based on VW Type 1 independent rear suspension, rear suspension arms may be lengthened up to 1 inch. Stock track width as measured, wheel mating surface to wheel mating surface must be maintained. No secondary suspension is allowed. Additional modifications are allowed with limitations. No air or coilover shocks allowed.

=== Body ===
May not have a production appearing Utility or Sport Utility body. The minimum weight is 1550 lbs and the wheelbase must be open.

== Notable race teams ==
- Alvarez Racing Team

McMillin Racing - Luke McMillin

- Las Lomitas Racing - J David Ruvalcaba
