= Baja 500 =

Mexican off-road motorsport race

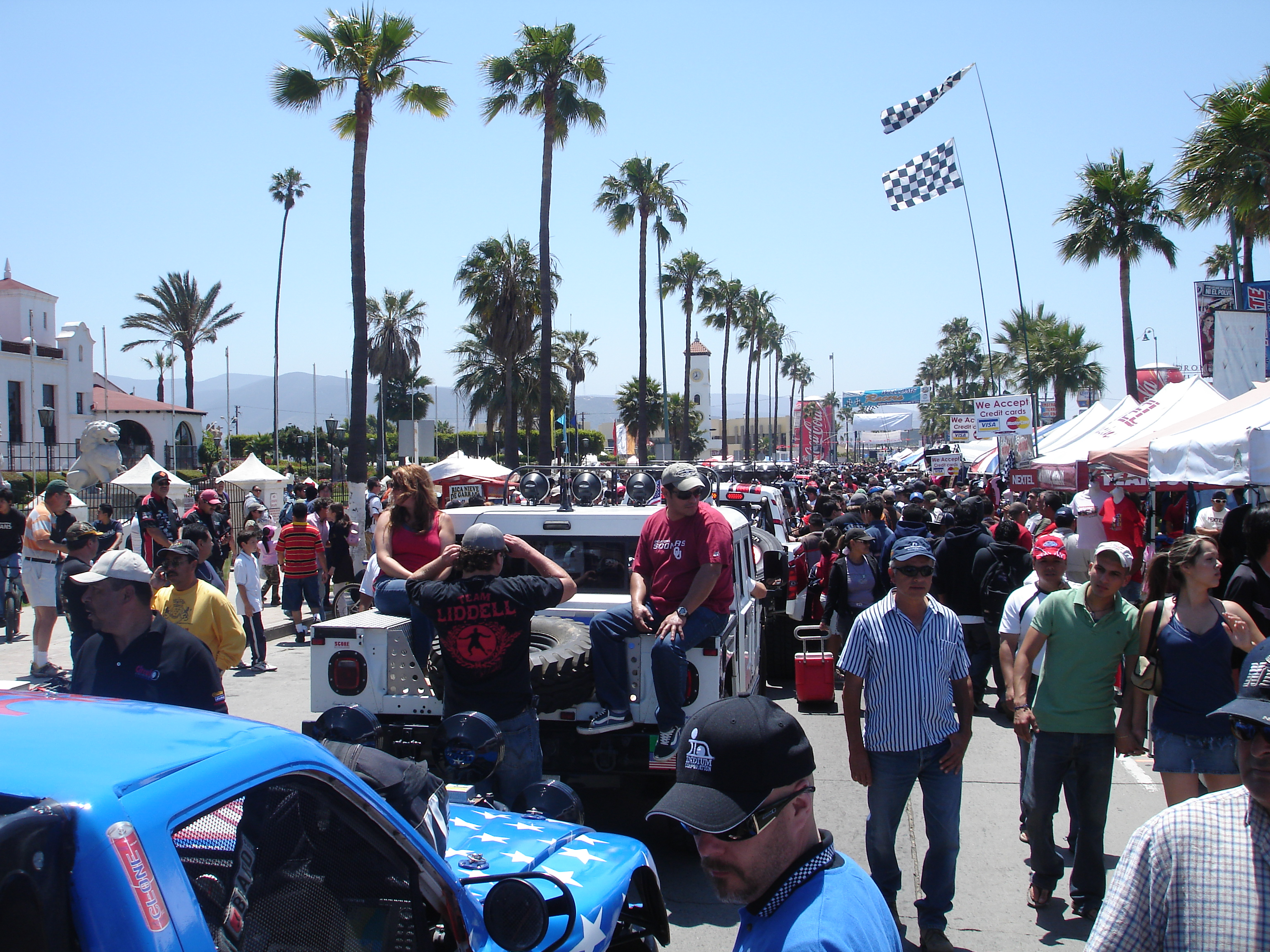
2008 Baja 500 contingency

The Baja 500 is a Mexican off-road motorsport race on the Baja California Peninsula that is sanctioned by SCORE International. The course has remained relatively the same over the years with the majority of events being loop races starting and finishing in Ensenada. Race course mileage varies and is usually slightly under 500 miles.

The event includes various types of vehicle classes such as Trophy trucks, Dirtbikes, UTVs, Baja Bugs, Buggies and custom fabricated race vehicles.

== Current and past classes ==
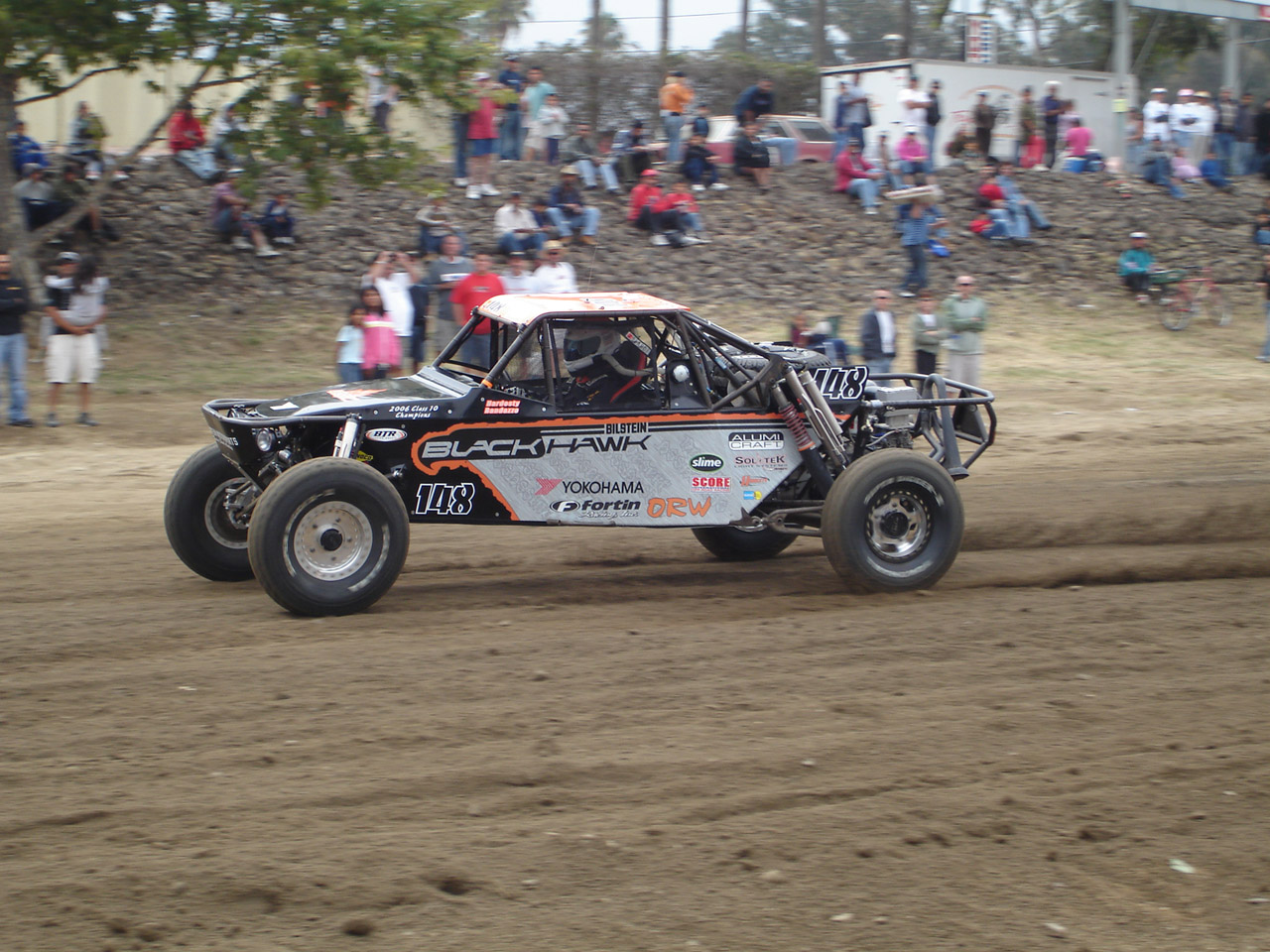
Class 1 competing in the 2007 Baja 500

=== Cars and Trucks ===
- SCORE Trophy Truck: Open Production Unlimited Trucks.
- SCORE Trophy Truck Legends: Open Production Unlimited Trucks ford Drivers 50 years and older.
- SCORE Trophy Truck Spec: Open Production Unlimited Trucks with stock / sealed V-8 Engines / 2wd.
- SCORE Class 1: Unlimited open-wheel single-or two-seaters.
- SCORE Class 1/2-1600: Limited suspension. open-wheel single-or two-seaters. (1600cc)
- SCORE Class 2: Limited 2.2 liter buggy.
- SCORE Class 3: Production short wheelbase 4x4 Jeeps.
- SCORE Class 4: Unlimited 2.2 liter open wheel.
- SCORE Class 5: Unlimited Baja Bugs.
- SCORE Class 5-1600: Baja Bugs. (1600cc)
- SCORE Class 6: V6 powered tube chassis trucks
- SCORE Class 7: Open mini trucks.
- SCORE Class 7S: Stock mini trucks. (3000cc)
- SCORE Class 7SX: Modified mini trucks. (4000cc)
- SCORE Class 8: Full-sized two-wheel drive trucks.
- SCORE Class 9: Short wheelbase, open-wheel. single-or two-seaters. (1600cc)
- SCORE Class 10: Open-wheel single or two-seaters. (2000cc)
- SCORE Class 11: Stock VW Sedans. (1600cc)
- SCORE Lites Class 12: VW limited open-wheel. single seat (1776cc) or two-seaters (1835cc).
- SCORE Class 17: Production short wheelbase 4x4 Modified Jeeps.
- SCORE Stock Full: Stock full-sized trucks.
- SCORE Stock Mini: Stock mini trucks. (4300cc)
- SCORE Baja Challenge: Limited, identical open-wheel Baja touring cars.
- SCORE Sportsman Buggy:
- SCORE Sportsman Truck:
- SCORE Sportsman UTV: 660cc, 4-wheel utility vehicle.
- ProTruck: Limited Production Trucks governed by the Baja ProTruck Off-Road Race Series

=== Motorcycles ===
- SCORE Class 20: 125cc or smaller two-stroke and 250cc or smaller four-stroke motorcycles.
- SCORE Class 21: 126cc to 250cc.
- SCORE Class 22: 250cc or more.
- SCORE Class 30: Riders over 30 years old.
- SCORE Class 40: Riders over 40 years old.
- SCORE Class 50: Riders over 50 years old.
- SCORE Class 60: Riders over 60 years old.

=== ATVs ===
- SCORE Class 24: 250cc or less.
- SCORE Class 25: 251cc or more.

== Overall winners ==
Year	Cars & Trucks		Motorcycle	
	Drivers	Vehicle	Riders	Vehicle
1969	Bud Ekins, Guy Jones	Baja Boot Olds	Doug Douglas, Jim McClurg	Ducati
1970	Parnelli Jones	Ford bronco	Bill Silverthorn, Gene Fetty	Husqvarna
1971	Bobby Ferro	Funco VW	Malcolm Smith, J.N. Roberts	Husqvarna
1972	Bobby Ferro	Sandmaster VW	Gene Fetty, Bill Silverthorn	Honda
1973	Parnelli Jones, Ethan Hair	Ford	Howard Utsey, Mickey Quade	Husqvarna
1974	Bobby Ferro, Spencer Cookson	Sandmaster VW	Mitch Mayes, A.C. Bakken	Husqvarna
1975	Ivan Stewart	Funco VW	Larry Roeseler, Bruce Ogilvie	Harley-Davidson
1976	Bobby Ferro, Ivan Stewart	Funco VW	Larry Roeseler, A.C. Bakken	Husqvarna
1977	Ivan Stewart	Chenowth VW	Larry Roeseler, Jack Johnson	Husqvarna
1978	Bud Feldkamp, Malcolm Smith	Funco VW	Brent Wallingsford, Scot Harden	Husqvarna
1979	Malcolm Smith, Bud Feldkamp	Funco VW	Jack Johnson	Husqvarna
1980	Bob Gordon	Chenowth Chevy	Bruce Ogilvie, Chuck Miller	Yamaha
1981	Malcolm Smith, Bill Newbury	Chenowth Chevy	Larry Roeseler, Bruce Ogilvie	Yamaha
1982	Larry Ragland	Funco VW	Larry Roeseler, Chuck Miller	Yamaha
1983	Corky McMillin, Scott McMillin	Chenowth VW	Dan Ashcraft	Husqvarna
1984*	Larry Ragland	Chaparral VW	Dan Smith, Dan Ashcraft	Husqvarna
1985	Ron Gardner, Bud Feldkamp	Funco VW	Kurt Pfeiffer, Scot Harden	Husqvarna
1986	Corky McMillin, Scott McMillin	Chenowth Porsche	Garth Sweetland, Scot Harden	Husqvarna
1987	Bob Gordon, Tim Crabtree	Chenowth Porsche	Larry Roeseler, Ted Hunnicutt Jr.	Kawasaki
1988	Mark McMillin	Chenowth Porsche	Dan Ashcraft, Kurt Pfeiffer	Yamaha
1989	Robby Gordon	Ford	-	-
1990	Robby Gordon	Ford	Larry Roeseler, Danny LaPorte	Kawasaki
1991	Ivan Stewart	Toyota	Garth Sweetland, Paul Krause	Kawasaki
1992	Ivan Stewart	Toyota	Larry Roeseler, Ted Hunnicutt Jr., Paul Krause	Kawasaki
1993	Ivan Stewart	Toyota	Danny Hamel, Larry Roeseler, Ted Hunnicutt Jr.	Kawasaki
1994	Dave Ashley, Dan Smith	Ford	Paul Krause, Ted Hunnicutt Jr.	Kawasaki
	Ivan Stewart	Toyota Trophy Truck		
1995	Mike Julson, Bob Lofton	Jimco VW	Paul Krause, Craig Smith	Kawasaki
	Curt LeDuc	Jeep Trophy Truck		
1996	Troy Herbst	Smithbuilt Porsche	Paul Krause, Ty Davis	Kawasaki
	Rob MacCachren	Ford Trophy Truck		
1997	Mark McMillin	Jimco Porsche	Johnny Campbell, Bruce Ogilvie	Honda
	Ivan Stewart	Toyota Trophy Truck		
1998	Ivan Stewart	Toyota	Johnny Campbell, Bruce Ogilvie	Honda
1999	Ivan Stewart	Toyota	Jonah Street, Torsten Borstrom	Honda
2000	Larry Ragland	Chevy	Jonah Street, Steve Hengeveld	Honda
2001	Mark McMillin	Jimco Chevy	Steve Hengeveld, Jonah Street	Honda
2002	Troy Herbst, Larry Roeseler	Smithbuilt Ford	Steve Hengeveld, Johnny Campbell	Honda
2003	Troy Herbst, Larry Roeseler	Smithbuilt Ford	Steve Hengeveld, Johnny Campbell	Honda
2004	Alan Pflueger	Chevy	Steve Hengeveld, Johnny Campbell	Honda
2005	Robby Gordon	Chevy	Mike Childress, Mouse McCoy	Honda
2006	Larry Ragland, Brian Collins	Chevy	Robby Bell, Kendall Norman	Honda
2007	Larry Ragland, Brian Collins	Chevy	Robby Bell, Kendall Norman, Steve Hengeveld	Honda
2008	B.J. Baldwin	Chevy	Robby Bell, Kendall Norman	Honda
2009	Kory Halopoff, Harley Letner	Alpha Class 1	Bill Boyer, Donnie De Arman, Nicholas Blais, Rudy Iribe	Honda
2010	Andy McMillin, Scott McMillin	Ford	Kendall Norman, Quinn Cody	Honda
2011	Bryce Menzies	Ford	Kendall Norman, Quinn Cody	Honda
2012	Bryce Menzies	Ford	Robby Bell, David Pearson, Steve Hengeveld	Kawasaki
2013	Robby Gordon	Chevy	Timmy Weigand, Colton Udall, David Kamo	Honda
2014	Bryce Menzies	Ford	Ricky Brabec, David Pearson, Max Eddy Jr.	Kawasaki
2015	Apdaly Lopez, Aaron Ampudia	Ford	Justin Morgan, Max Eddy, Ian Young	Kawasaki
2016	Tavo Vildósola, Aaron Ampudia	Ford	Colton Udall, Mark Samuels	Honda CRF450X
2017	Andy McMillin	Geiser	Francisco Arredondo, Justin Morgan, Shane Esposito, Roberto Viallobos	Honda CRF450X
2018	Rob MacCachren	Ford	Justin Morgan	Honda CRF450X
2019	Andy McMillin	Chevrolet	Justin Morgan	Honda CRF450X
2020	Dan McMillin	Chevrolet	Mark Samuels	Honda
2021	Larry Roeseler	Toyota	Jason Alosi	Husqvarna
2022	Rob MacCachren	Ford	Juan Carlos Salvatierra	KTM
2023	Bryce Menzies	Ford	Arturo Salas	KTM
2024	Toby Price, Paul Weel	Mason	Arturo Salas	Honda
2025	Alan Ampudia	Tyler Lynn	Honda	
2026	Luke McMillin	Chevrolet	Tyler Lynn	Honda

- 1984: Race moved to Barstow, California, due to political tensions in Mexico

== See also ==
- SCORE International
- Baja 1000
- Baja 250
