= Ivan Stewart =

American racing driver (born 1945)

Ivan "Ironman" Stewart
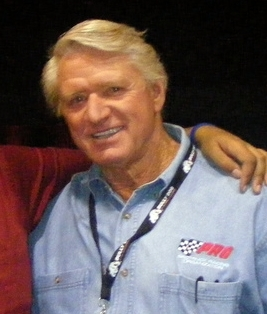
- Stewart in 2008
- Born: June 4, 1945 (age 81) Oklahoma, United States
- Retired: 1999
- Relatives: Brian Stewart (son); Gary Stewart (son); Craig Stewart (son)

Off-Road Racing
- Years active: 1973–1999
- Teams: Modern Motors; PPI Motorsports
- Championships: 15
- Wins: 84

Championship titles
- 1975 1976 1977 1979 1983 1984 1990 1993 1995: Driver of the Year SCORE; Driver of the Year SCORE; Driver of the Year SCORE; Driver of the Year SCORE; Driver of the Year SCORE; GNST Driver’s Champion MTEG; Driver of the Year SCORE; GNST Driver’s Champion MTEG; Driver of the Year SCORE/HDRA; Overall Driver’s Champion SCORE/HDRA; Unlimited Class Driver’s Champion SCORE/HDRA; GNST Driver’s Champion MTEG; Overall Driver’s Champion SCORE; Unlimited Class Driver’s Champion SCORE; Trophy-Truck Class Driver’s Champion SCORE

Awards
- 1976 1980 1983 1984 1990 1993 1995 2006 2009: Bilstein Madonna Man of the Year; Bilstein Madonna Man of the Year; Dennis Keefe Memorial Award; Dennis Keefe Memorial Award; Bilstein Madonna Man of the Year; All American Team AARWBA; Mickey & Trudy Thompson Golden Heart Award MTEG; All American Team AARWBA; All American Team AARWBA; Inducted into the Off-road Motorsports Hall of Fame; Inducted into the San Diego Hall of Champions Breitbard Hall of Fame

Ivan "Ironman" Stewart (born June 4, 1945) is an American former professional off road racing driver. Stewart started racing professionally in 1973, aged 27. He was one of the most successful off-road racing drivers with 84 wins and 15 championship titles. Stewart retired from racing in 1999 and co-founded the ProTruck Racing Organization. In 2008, Toyota released a limited "Ivan Stewart Ironman" edition of its Toyota Tundra pickup truck.

== Racing career ==
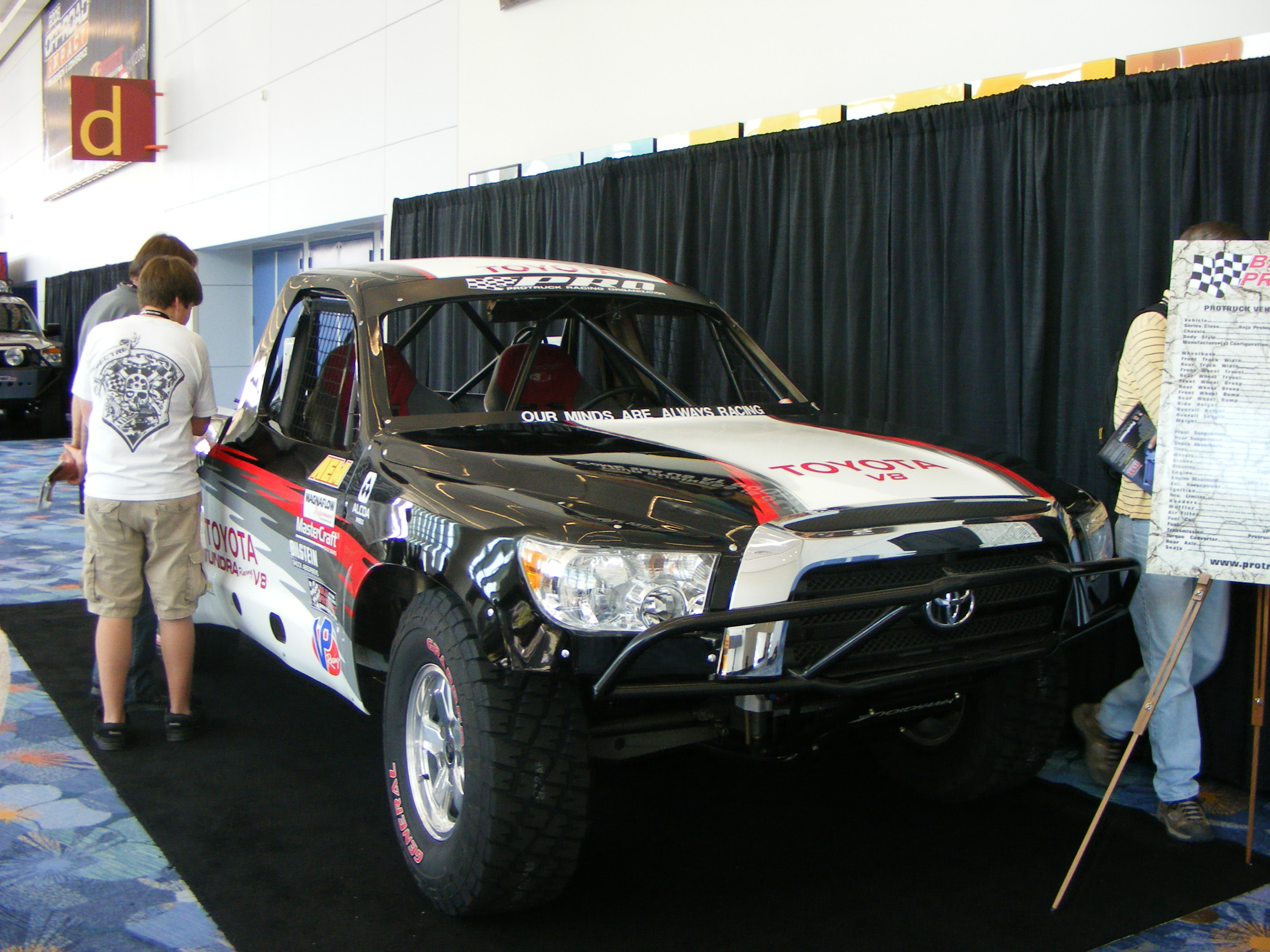
An Ironman Protruck

In 1973, Stewart was scheduled to co-drive (navigate) in the Ensenada 300 in a Class 1-2 dune buggy. His driver broke his leg, so Stewart drove the car himself, and won the race.

After some additional wins, Stewart joined the Toyota factory team in 1983 for Cal Wells at Precision Preparation Inc. He won a total of 82 races, with a record 17 wins in Mickey Thompson Entertainment Group's (MTEG) stadium series, a record 17 Baja 500's, three Baja 1000's, and SCORE International events. He has won ten point championships, including four SCORE World championships and three MTEG championships. He is the only person so far to win overall, including motorcycles, while driving a four-wheel vehicle solo in the Baja 1000.

Stewart retired from racing in 1999. He continued to be instrumental in off road racing, becoming a founder in the ProTruck Racing Organization. Since then Toyota introduced the Toyota Tundra pickup truck and soon afterwards produced a very limited number of trucks as the Ivan Stewart Ironman edition. These trucks featured a special Ivan Stewart signature package with Toyota Racing Development (TRD) wheels, grille, interior, and supercharger.

== Other events ==
Stewart also became known in the video game circuit, lending his name and his style of stadium racing to a 1989 game entitled Ivan 'Ironman' Stewart's Super Off Road. He wrote a book, Ivan "Ironman" Stewart's Ultimate Off-Road Adventure Guide (Motorbooks, 2007). He also appeared in the Live Action Video for Kids/Real Wheels video, "There Goes a Race Car."

== Race wins ==
1973
Race	Team	Vehicle	Power	Class	Finish
Baja 300 (Baja Sports Committee)		Buggy		Class 2	1st
Ensenada 300 (SCORE)	Modern Motors	Funco Buggy	VW	Class 2	Overall Winner

1974
Race	Team	Vehicle	Power	Class	Finish
Off-Road World Championships (SCORE)		Buggy		Class 2	1st
Baja 300 (Baja Sports Committee)		Buggy		Class 2	1st
Baja 500 (SCORE)		Buggy		Class 2	1st
Borrego 150 (SCORE)		Buggy		Class 2	1st
Baja 500 (Baja Sports Committee)		Buggy		Unlimited Class	1st

1975
Race	Team	Vehicle	Power	Class	Finish
Baja 300 (SCORE)	Modern Motors	Funco Buggy	VW	Unlimited Class	Overall Winner
Baja 1000 (SCORE)	Modern Motors	Funco Buggy	VW	Unlimited Class	Overall Winner

1976
Race	Team	Vehicle	Power	Class	Finish
Firecracker 250 (HDRA)				Unlimited Class	Overall Winner
St. Patrick’s Day Classic (HDRA)				Unlimited Class	1st
Wishbone 300 (SCORE)				Unlimited Class	1st
California 400 (HDRA)				Unlimited Class	Overall Winner
Baja 500 (SCORE)		Funco Buggy	VW	Unlimited Class	Overall Winner
Baja 1000 (SCORE)		Funco Buggy	VW	Unlimited Class	Overall Winner

1977
Race	Team	Vehicle	Power	Class	Finish
Baja 500 (SCORE)		Chenowth Buggy	VW	Unlimited Class	Overall Winner
St. Patrick’s Day Classic (HDRA)				Unlimited Class	1st
Firecracker 250 (HDRA)				Unlimited Class	Overall Winner

1978
Race	Team	Vehicle	Power	Class	Finish
Parker 400 (SCORE)				Class 8	1st

1979
Race	Team	Vehicle	Power	Class	Finish
Mexicali 250 (CORE)				Class 8	1st
Mint 400 (HDRA)				Class 8	1st
Firebird Lake (HDRA)				Class 8	1st

1980
Race	Team	Vehicle	Power	Class	Finish
Riverside Heavy Metal Challenge				Class 8	1st
Baja 500				Class 8	1st

1981
Race	Team	Vehicle	Power	Class	Finish
Riverside Heavy Metal Challenge (SCORE)				Class 8	1st

1982
Race	Team	Vehicle	Power	Class	Finish
Mint 400 (HDRA)				Class 8	1st
Frontier 500 (HDRA)				Class 8	1st

1983
Race	Team	Vehicle	Power	Class	Finish
Pomona MTEG	Precision Preparation Incorporated (PPI)		Toyota	Grand National Sport Trucks	1st
Off-Road World Championships (SCORE)				Class 7	1st
Firecracker 250 (HDRA)				Class 8	1st

1984
Race	Team	Vehicle	Power	Class	Finish
Baja 500 (SCORE)				Class 7	1st
Great Mojave 250 (SCORE/HDRA)				Class 7	1st
Mint 400 (HDRA)				Class 7	1st
Pomona MTEG	Precision Preparation Incorporated (PPI)		Toyota	Grand National Sport Trucks	1st
Off-Road World Championships (SCORE)				Class 7	1st

1985
Race	Team	Vehicle	Power	Class	Finish
California 400 (HDRA)				Class 7	1st
Los Angeles Coliseum MTEG	Precision Preparation Incorporated (PPI)		Toyota	Grand National Sport Trucks	1st
Off-Road World Championships (SCORE)				Class 7	1st

1986
Race	Team	Vehicle	Power	Class	Finish
Great Mojave 250 (SCORE) (HDRA)				Unlimited Class	1st
Baja 500 (SCORE)				Unlimited Class	1st

1987
Race	Team	Vehicle	Power	Class	Finish
Gold Coast 300 (SCORE) (HDRA)				Unlimited Class	1st
Detroit MTEG	Precision Preparation Incorporated (PPI)		Toyota	Grand National Sport Trucks	1st

1988
Race	Team	Vehicle	Power	Class	Finish
Off-Road World Championships (SCORE/HDRA)				Unlimited Class	1st
Las Vegas MTEG	Precision Preparation Incorporated (PPI)		Toyota	Grand National Sport Trucks	1st

1989
Race	Team	Vehicle	Power	Class	Finish
Mint 400 (HDRA)				Unlimited Class	Overall
Baja 500 (HDRA)				Unlimited Class	1st
Las Vegas MTEG	Precision Preparation Incorporated (PPI)		Toyota	Grand National Sport Trucks	1st
Gold Coast 300 (HDRA)				Unlimited Class	1st

1990
Race	Team	Vehicle	Power	Class	Finish
Anaheim MTEG	Precision Preparation Incorporated (PPI)		Toyota	Grand National Sport Trucks	1st
Parker 400 (SCORE)				Unlimited Class	Overall
Nissan 400 (HDRA)				Unlimited Class	Overall
Seattle MTEG	Precision Preparation Incorporated (PPI)		Toyota	Grand National Sport Trucks	1st
Rose Bowl MTEG	Precision Preparation Incorporated (PPI)		Toyota	Grand National Sport Trucks	1st
Baja 500 (SCORE)				Unlimited Class	1st
Fireworks 250 (HDRA)				Unlimited Class	1st
Nevada 500 (HDRA)				Unlimited Class	Overall
Las Vegas MTEG	Precision Preparation Incorporated (PPI)		Toyota	Grand National Sport Trucks	1st
Gold Coast 300 (HDRA)				Unlimited Class	Overall
San Francisco MTEG	Precision Preparation Incorporated (PPI)		Toyota	Grand National Sport Trucks	1st

1991
Race	Team	Vehicle	Power	Class	Finish
Nissan 400 (HDRA)				Unlimited Class	1st
Baja 500 (SCORE)	Precision Preparation Incorporated (PPI)		Toyota	Unlimited Class	Overall
Los Angeles Coliseum MTEG	Precision Preparation Incorporated (PPI)		Toyota	Grand National Sport Trucks	1st
Nevada 500 (HDRA)				Unlimited Class	Overall

1992
Race	Team	Vehicle	Power	Class	Finish
San Diego MTEG	Precision Preparation Incorporated (PPI)		Toyota	Grand National Sport Trucks	1st
Nissan 400 (HDRA)				Unlimited Class	1st
Baja 500 (SCORE)	Precision Preparation Incorporated (PPI)		Toyota	Unlimited Class	Overall
San Francisco MTEG	Precision Preparation Incorporated (PPI)		Toyota	Grand National Sport Trucks	1st

1993
Race	Team	Vehicle	Power	Class	Finish
Parker 400 (SCORE)				Unlimited Class	Overall
San Diego MTEG	Precision Preparation Incorporated (PPI)		Toyota	Grand National Sport Trucks	1st
Nevada 400 (HDRA)				Unlimited Class	Overall
Pasadena Rose Bowl MTEG	Precision Preparation Incorporated (PPI)		Toyota	Grand National Sport Trucks	1st
Baja 500 (SCORE)	Precision Preparation Incorporated (PPI)		Toyota	Unlimited Class	Overall
Las Vegas Silver Bowl MTEG	Precision Preparation Incorporated (PPI)		Toyota	Grand National Sport Trucks	1st
Baja 1000 (SCORE)	Precision Preparation Incorporated (PPI)		Toyota	Unlimited Class	Overall

1994
Race	Team	Vehicle	Power	Class	Finish
San Felipe 250 (SCORE)	Precision Preparation Incorporated (PPI)		Toyota	Trophy-Truck	1st
Baja 500 (SCORE)	Precision Preparation Incorporated (PPI)		Toyota	Trophy-Truck	1st
Fireworks 250 (SCORE)	Precision Preparation Incorporated (PPI)		Toyota	Trophy-Truck	1st

1995
Race	Team	Vehicle	Power	Class	Finish
Laughlin Desert Challenge (SCORE)	Precision Preparation Incorporated (PPI)		Toyota	Trophy-Truck	1st
Parker 400 (SCORE)	Precision Preparation Incorporated (PPI)		Toyota	Trophy-Truck	1st

1997
Race	Team	Vehicle	Power	Class	Finish
Baja 500 (SCORE)	Precision Preparation Incorporated (PPI)		Toyota	Trophy-Truck	1st

1998
Race	Team	Vehicle	Power	Class	Finish
Baja 500 (SCORE)	Precision Preparation Incorporated (PPI)		Toyota	Trophy-Truck	Overall
Baja 1000 (SCORE)	Precision Preparation Incorporated (PPI)		Toyota	Trophy-Truck	Overall

1999
Race	Team	Vehicle	Power	Class	Finish
Baja 500 (SCORE)	Precision Preparation Incorporated (PPI)		Toyota	Trophy-Truck	Overall

== Awards ==
Stewart was a 2006 inductee in the Off-road Motorsports Hall of Fame.

In 2009, Stewart was inducted into the San Diego Hall of Champions Breitbard Hall of Fame.

Stewart was inducted into the Motorsports Hall of Fame of America on March 17, 2020.
