= SCORE Class 1 =

SCORE Class 1 is an open-wheel unlimited-class that competes in the SCORE off-road race series including the Baja 1000, Baja 500, San Felipe 250 and the SCORE Desert Challenge. Class 1 is defined as an unlimited four-wheel single and two-seat vehicles. No production bodied vehicles allowed in this class. Engines must be normally aspirated. Since it is an open-class, all components are considered open unless restricted by SCORE International.

Vehicle numbers have become permanently assigned to each driver. Numbers 100-109 is reserved for the prior years driver standings for positions 1-10 respectively. Numbers 110-199 will be available for assignment. Drivers who have used a number in the prior years season will be given first option for the same number in the current season.

== Vehicle description ==
Class 1 vehicles are most often two-wheel drive, and most feature a 4130 chromoly tube-frame chassis covered by a composite body with an aluminium interior containing either a single or two seats.

The Class 1 features a 125" wheelbase with 37" tires on 17" lightweight wheels allowing 22" of wheel travel, with a dry weight of 3500 pounds and 60 gallon fuel cell.

== Class requirements ==
=== Engine ===
Unlimited. Usually V8, rarely V6. 500BHP and greater.

=== Suspension ===
Unlimited.

=== Body ===
May not have a production appearing Utility or Sport Utility body.

== Notable race teams ==
- All German Motorsports - Armin Schwarz, Martin Christensen, Armin Kremer
- Letner Racing - Kory Halopoff, Harley Letner
- McMillin Racing - Daniel McMillin
- Class1Racing.com - Charles Rudolph
- Wilson Motorsports - Randy Wilson, Ronny Wilson
- LVDC- Pat Dean
- DanZio Racing - Josh Daniel
- Cops Racing Team
