= SCORE International =

Off-road racing sanctioning body in the United States and Mexico

- Category: Off-road racing
- Country: United States; Mexico
- Inaugural season: 1973
- Official website: score-international.com

SCORE International (Southern California Off Road Enthusiasts) is an off-road racing sanctioning body in the sport of desert racing. Founded by Mickey Thompson in 1973, SCORE International was purchased from Sal Fish in late 2012. and is run by its current president and race director Jose A. Grijalva and General Manager Juan Tintos.

The sanctioning body's premier series is the SCORE World Desert Championship, which consists of four races in Baja California peninsula: the Baja 250, Baja 500, Baja 400, and Baja 1000.

== Race format ==
Vehicles are released from the start line individually, in gaps of 60 seconds between Trophy Trucks and Class 1 racers then 30 seconds for all other classes.

Baja races include motorcycles and quad bikes; which start staging at 5:15am and later released around 6am. Four-wheel vehicles start releasing approximately five hours later at around 11am. Race results are determined by calculating a finish time for each vehicle. The finish time for a vehicle can include time for penalties such as speeding. GPS tracking devices are used to enforce speed regulations and penalties on federal highways and highly congested areas.

Awards are given for the winner of each class (if a vehicle in the class finishes) as well as an overall winner across classes, overall four-wheel and overall motorcycle/ATV.

Points are awarded based on class finishing position. The racer with the most points at the end of the season is the overall class winner. In the following race season, the vehicle number will end in two zeros "00" to indicate that racer as the class champion. For example, the vehicle number for the Class 1 champion would be No. 100 while the Trophy Truck champion can run No. 1. The starting order is generally determined by a random draw, except when preferential starts are given to those who finished in top positions in the previous race/season, or when qualifying is held.

Starting with Roger Norman's purchase of SCORE in 2012, vehicle numbers have become permanently assigned to each driver. Numbers 1–9 are reserved for the prior year's driver standings in those respective positions, while 10–99 are available for assignment. Drivers who have used a number in the prior years season will be given first option for the same number in the current season.

SCORE International operates an "Ironman" class for racers that complete a race without any driver change. Commemorative ribbons are given to any racers who completed a race solely. Baja legend Ivan "Ironman" Stewart was the first racer to complete this feat in 1975, capturing his first Baja 500 win before winning the 1976 Baja 1000 under this format.

Course terrain is primarily off-road in remote areas, though highway segments are used when an alternate off-road route is unavailable. Some classes like Moto, Quad, and Class 11 run different routes from others that bypass certain locations.

== Yearly races ==
Race	Location	Description
Baja 250	Mexicali, Baja California, Mexico	One loop, approximately 250 miles
Baja 500	Ensenada, Baja California, Mexico	One loop, approximately 500 miles
Baja 400	Ensenada, Baja California, Mexico	One loop, approximately 400 miles
Baja 1000	Ensenada, Baja California, Mexico	One loop, approximately 1,000 miles

== Vehicle classes ==
=== Cars and Trucks ===
- SCORE Trophy Truck: Open Production Unlimited Trucks.
- SCORE Class 1: Unlimited open-wheel single-or two-seaters.
- SCORE Class 1/2-1600: Limited suspension. open-wheel single-or two-seaters. (1600cc)
- SCORE Class 2: Limited 3.5 liter buggy.
- SCORE Class 3: Production short wheelbase 4x4 Jeeps.
- SCORE Class 4: Unlimited 2.2 liter open wheel.
- SCORE Class 5: Unlimited Baja Bugs.
- SCORE Class 5-1600: Baja Bugs. (1600cc)
- SCORE Class 6: V6 powered tube chassis trucks
- SCORE Class 7: Open mini trucks.
- SCORE Class 7S: Stock mini trucks. (3000cc)
- SCORE Class 7SX: Modified mini trucks. (4000cc)
- SCORE Class 8: Full-sized two-wheel drive trucks.
- SCORE Class 9: Short wheelbase, open-wheel. single-or two-seaters. (1600cc)
- SCORE Class 10: Open-wheel single or two-seaters. (2000cc)
- SCORE Class 11: Stock VW Sedans. (1600cc)
- SCORE Lites Class 12: VW limited open-wheel. single seat (1776cc) or two-seaters (1835cc).
- SCORE Class 17: Production short wheelbase 4x4 Modified Jeeps.
- SCORE Stock Full: Stock full-sized trucks.
- SCORE Stock Mini: Stock mini trucks. (4300cc)
- SCORE Class M-Truck: 2 or 4-wheel drive medium utility vehicle with a minimum weight 12,000 pounds.
- SCORE Baja Challenge: Limited, identical open-wheel Baja touring cars.
- SCORE Sportsman Buggy:
- SCORE Sportsman Truck:
- SCORE Sportsman UTV: 660cc, 4-wheel utility vehicle.
- ProTruck: Limited Production Trucks governed by the Baja ProTruck Off-Road Race Series

=== Motorcycles ===
- SCORE Class 20: 125cc or smaller two-stroke and 250cc or smaller four-stroke motorcycles.
- SCORE Class 21: 126cc to 250cc.
- SCORE Class 22: 250cc or more.
- SCORE Class 30: Riders over 30 years old.
- SCORE Class 40: Riders over 40 years old.
- SCORE Class 50: Riders over 50 years old.
- SCORE Class 60: Riders over 60 years old.

=== ATVs ===
- SCORE Class 24: 250cc or less.
- SCORE Class 25: 251cc or more.
- SCORE Class 26: Limited utility ATV

== In media ==
A documentary about the 2003 Baja 1000 titled Dust to Glory was released in 2005. A sequel Dust 2 Glory, which covers the 2016 race, came out in 2017.

SCORE International lent its name to the 2008 video game SCORE International Baja 1000. It was released on Microsoft Windows, PlayStation 2, PlayStation 3, Wii, and Xbox 360.

In 2015, SCORE International opted to air their three original television series, Roost, Guerrero, and SCORE International Off-Road Racing on digital video-on-demand platform, CarbonTV.

SCORE International licensed a burger restaurant (SCORE Baja Burgers & Beer) in Chula Vista, California, United States.
