= List of family relations in auto racing =

This is a list of family relations in auto racing. The list includes drivers, pit personnel, team managers and team owners.

== Siblings ==
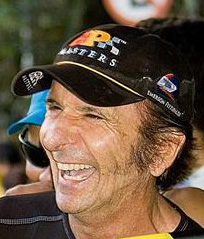
Emerson Fittipaldi raced in Formula One, like his brother Wilson Fittipaldi Júnior. In 1974, the two brothers formed the racing team Fittipaldi Automotive, for which Wilson raced in 1975, and Emerson from 1976 to 1980.

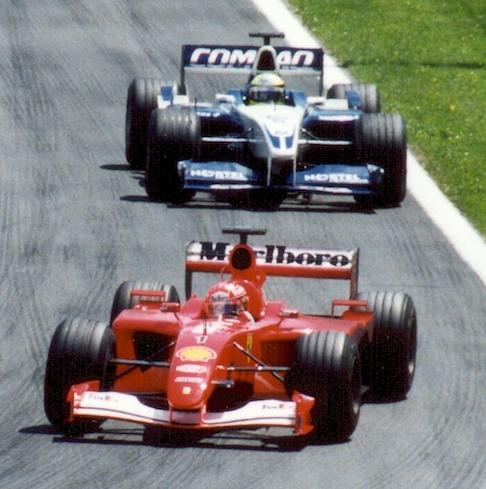
Michael and Ralf Schumacher are the most successful sibling pairing in F1.

Surname	Siblings	Country	Notes
Alboreto	Michele, Ermanno	Italy	
Allemann	Cyndie, Ken	Switzerland	
Allison	Bobby, Donnie	United States	Bobby and Donnie's grandchildren have raced Late Models, with Donnie's grandson having won an ARCA Racing Series event.
Allison	Davey, Clifford	United States	Bobby and Donnie's grandchildren have raced Late Models, with Donnie's grandson having won an ARCA Racing Series event.
Alzen	Jürgen, Uwe	Germany	
Amick	George, Bill	United States	
Andersson	Klara, Magda	Sweden	
Andretti	Mario, Aldo	United States	The first generation of the racing family, identical twins Mario and Aldo, were born in a part of Italy that now lies in Croatia, and became naturalized US citizens. All of their listed descendants are US-born.
Andretti	Michael, Jeff	United States	The first generation of the racing family, identical twins Mario and Aldo, were born in a part of Italy that now lies in Croatia, and became naturalized US citizens. All of their listed descendants are US-born.
Andretti	John, Adam	United States	The first generation of the racing family, identical twins Mario and Aldo, were born in a part of Italy that now lies in Croatia, and became naturalized US citizens. All of their listed descendants are US-born.
Angelard	Maks, Julia	Poland	
Aron	Ralf, Paul	Estonia	
Atkinson	Chris, Ben	Australia	
Bachmann	Fernand, Raoul	France	
Bäckman	Jessica, Andreas	Sweden	
Baker	Buddy, Randy	United States	
Barba	Alvaro, Marco	Spain	
Barrichello	Eduardo, Fernando	Brazil	
Bassett	Dillon, Ronnie Jr.	United States	
Bates	Neal, Rick	Australia	Twin brothers
Behra	José, Jean	France	
Bellof	Georg, Stefan	Germany	
Bergenholtz	Ed, Ron	United States	
Bergmeister	Jörg, Tim	Germany	
Bettenhausen	Gary, Tony Jr., Merle	United States	
Bianchi	Lucien, Mauro	Belgium	
Birrell	Graham, Gerry, Ian	United Kingdom	
Blaney	Dale, Dave	United States	
Bleekemolen	Jeroen, Sebastiaan	Netherlands	
Blewett	John III, Jimmy	United States	
Bodine	Geoff, Brett, Todd	United States	
Boillot	Georges, André	France	
Boss	Geoff, Andy, Peter	United States	
Bouchard	Ron, Ken	United States	
Bown	Chuck, Jim	United States	
Brabham	Geoff, Gary, David	Australia	
Bradberry	Gary, Charlie	United States	
Brambilla	Ernesto, Vittorio	Italy	
Brundle	Martin, Robin	United Kingdom	
Bueno	Cacá, Pópo	Brazil	
Buncombe	Alex, Chris	United Kingdom	
Burton	Ward, Jeff	United States	
Busch	Kurt, Kyle	United States	
Butler	Ken III, Brett	United States	
Butler-Henderson	Charlie, Vicki	United Kingdom	
Campos	Marco, Júlio	Brazil	
Campos-Hull	Oliver, Daniel	Spain	
Canapino	Agustin, Matías	Argentina	
Cecotto	Johnny (junior), Jonathan	Venezuela	
Ceirano	Giovanni, Matteo	Italy	
Charouz	Jan, Petr	Czech Republic	
Chastain	Ross, Chad	United States	
Cheever	Eddie, Ross	United States	
Chevrolet	Louis, Gaston, Arthur	United States	
Chilton	Max, Tom	United Kingdom	
Clark	Roger, Stan	United Kingdom	
Clark	Oliver, Matthew	United Kingdom	
Colliers	Sam, Miles	United States	
Cope	Angela, Amber	United States	Twin sisters
Cordeel	Ghislain, Amaury	Belgium	
Coronel	Tim, Tom	Netherlands	Twin brothers
Costin	Frank, Mike	United Kingdom	
Cunningham	Wade, Mitch	New Zealand	
Dalziel	John, Ryan	United Kingdom	
Davison	Alex, Will	Australia	
Depailler	Patrick, Loic	France	
DePalma	John, Ralph	United States	
Dillon	Austin, Ty	United States	
Di Palma	José Luis, Patricio, Marcos	Argentina	
Donahue	Kevin, Kyle	United States	
Dumoulin	Louis-Philippe, Jean-François	Canada	
Dunfee	Clive, Jack	United Kingdom	
Earnhardt	Kelley, Dale Jr.	United States	
Earnhardt	Bobby Dale, Jeffrey	United States	
van der Ende	Jacky, Ricardo	Netherlands	
Enders	Erica, Courtney	United States	
Endicott	Bill, Harry	United States	
Ericsson	Marcus, Hampus	Sweden	
Eriksson	Jimmy, Joel	Sweden	
Estner	Andreas, Sebastian	Germany	
Evans	Simon, Mitch	New Zealand	
Fabi	Teo, Corrado	Italy	
Fagioli	Luigi, Giuseppe	Italy	
Falk	Eddie, Joe	United States	
Famularo	Alessandro, Anthony	Venezuela	Twin brothers
Farman	Maurice, Henri	France	
Farnbacher	Dominik, Mario	Germany	
Felbermayr	Horst Felix, Emma	Austria	
Ferté	Alain, Michel	France	
Fike	A. J., Aaron	United States	
Firman	Ralph Jr., Natasha	United Kingdom, Ireland	Ralph is an Irish citizen.
Fittipaldi	Wilson, Emerson	Brazil	
Fittipaldi	Pietro, Enzo	Brazil	
Flock	Bob, Ethel, Fonty, Tim	United States	
Force	Ashley, Courtney, Brittany	United States	
France	Bill Jr., Jim	United States	
France	Brian, Lesa	United States	
Franchitti	Dario, Marino	United Kingdom	
Gamble	George, Tom	United Kingdom	
Gelžinis	Jonas, Ignas	Lithuania	
Gené	Jordi, Marc	Spain	
Geoghegan	Ian, Leo	Australia	
Ghirelli	Vittorio, Edolo	Italy	
Gibbs	Coy, J. D.	United States	
Gilkes	Megan, Nick	Canada	
Girolami	Néstor, Franco	Argentina	
Goeters	Jorge, Eduardo, Patrick	Mexico	
Goethe	Oliver, Benjamin	Germany, Denmark	
Gordon	Robby, Beccy, Robyn	United States	
Granatelli	Andy, Vince, Joe	United States	
Gray	Tanner, Taylor	United States	
Green	Jeff, Mark, David	United States	
Groff	Mike, Robbie	United States	
Grubb	Kevin, Wayne	United States	
Gryazin	Nikolay, Vasiliy	Russia	
Guerrero	Jaime, Roberto	Colombia	
Gutiérrez	Esteban, José	Mexico	
Gutiérrez	Max, Frederico	Mexico	
Hancock	Sam, Ollie	United Kingdom	
Hansen	Kevin, Timmy	Sweden	
Heidfeld	Nick, Sven	Germany	
Hezemans	Mike, Loris	Netherlands	
Higgins	David, Mark	Isle of Man	
Hill	Timmy, Tyler	United States	
Houston	Marty, Andy	United States	
Huisman	Duncan, Patrick	Netherlands	
Hunt	James, David	United Kingdom	
Hutcherson	Dick, Ron	United States	
Ickx	Jacky, Pascal	Belgium	
Isaakyan	Matevos, Nerses	Russia	Twin brothers
Jarrett	Glenn, Dale	United States	
Johnson	Jimmie, Jarit	United States	
Jourdain	Michel Sr., Bernard	Mexico	
Jousse	Julien, Maxime	France	
Kageyama	Masami, Masahiko	Japan	
Kelly	Todd, Rick	Australia	
Keselowski	Bob, Ron	United States	
Keselowski	Brad, Brian	United States	
Kostecki	Jake, Kurt	Australia	
Kraihamer	Dominik, Laura	Austria	
Kremer	Erwin, Manfred	Germany	
Kristensen	Tom, Jakob	Denmark	
Krogh	Jeff, Mark	United States	
Kurosawa	Takuya, Haruki, Tsubasa	Japan	
Labonte	Terry, Bobby	United States	One of two sets of brothers in NASCAR Cup Series history to win at least one championship (Terry has 2 and Bobby has 1).
Ladygin	Kirill, Anton	Russia	
Lahaye	Matthieu, Jean-Baptiste	France	
Lammers	Jan, Jaap	Netherlands	
Landi	Chico, Quirino	Brazil	
Lapcevich	Cayden, Treyten	Canada	
Larini	Andrea, Nicola	Italy	
Lazier	Buddy, Jaques	United States	
Lechner	Robert, Walter Jr.	Austria	
Leclerc	Charles, Arthur	Monaco	
Leitch	Brendon, Damon	New Zealand	
van Lennep	Gijs, David	Netherlands	
van der Linde	Kelvin, Sheldon	South Africa	
Lorandi	Alessio, Leonardo	Italy	
Love	Jordan, Aaron	Australia	
Lundgaard	Daniel, Christian	Denmark	
Macrow	Adam, Tim	Australia	
Maini	Arjun, Kush	India	
Maldonado	Pastor, Manuel	Venezuela	
Mancinelli	Daniel, Christian	Italy	
Mansell	Greg, Leo	United Kingdom	
MacDonald	Randy, Teri	Canada	
Marlin	Clifton, Jack	United States	
Martini	Oliver, Pierluigi	Italy	
Marzotto	Paolo, Giannino, Vittorio, Umberto	Italy	
Mason	Jesse, Nelson	Canada	
Mayer	Timmy, Teddy	United States	
McNamara	Graham, Darren	Ireland	
McRae	Colin, Alister	United Kingdom	
Mears	Rick, Roger	United States	
Mikola/Suprapto	Ananda Mikola, Moreno Suprapto	Indonesia	
Millen	Steve, Rod	New Zealand	
Miller	Bruce, Al	United States	
Mondron	Edouard, Guillaume	Belgium	
Moore	Nigel, Sarah, David	United Kingdom	
Moss	Stirling, Pat	United Kingdom	
Move/Zlobin	Daniil Move, Sergey Zlobin	Russia	
Muller	Yvan, Cathy	France	
Nakajima	Kazuki, Daisuke	Japan	
Nascimento	Eric, Ethan	United States	
Nemechek	Joe, John (the brother)	United States	At the time of John's death, Joe and Andrea Nemechek were expecting their first child, who later was named for the deceased brother, John Hunter Nemechek (which he uses professionally).
Ojjeh	Mansour, Karim	Saudi Arabia	
Owega	Jusuf, Salman	Germany	Twin brothers
Palmer	Jolyon, Will	United Kingdom	
Pardo	Carlos, Rubén	Mexico	
Parker	Hank Jr., Billy	United States	
Parsons	Benny, Phil	United States	
Pastorelli	Nicky, Francesco	Netherlands	
Pecorari	Adam, Robbie	United States	
Pedregon	Cruz, Tony	United States	
Pepper	Jordan, Tasmin	South Africa	
Petiz	Pedro, Tiago	Portugal	Their father is Jorge Petiz
Petty	Richard, Maurice	United States	
Pérez	Sergio, Antonio	Mexico	
Pérez Companc	Luis, Pablo	Argentina	
Philippe	Nelson, Richard	France	
Pic	Charles, Arthur	France	
Plumb	Matt, Hugh	United States	
Al Qubaisi	Amna, Hamda	United Arab Emirates	
Räikkönen	Kimi, Rami	Finland	
Rathmann	Dick, Jim	United States	
Raudman	Craig, Chris	United States	
Reif	Tyler, Tanner	United States	
Renault	Louis, Marcel	France	
Reuse	Bobby, Roger	United States	
Revson	Peter, Doug	United States	
Ried	Jonas, Lenny	Germany	
Robson	George, Hal	United States	
Rodríguez	Pedro, Ricardo	Mexico	
Russo	Joe, Paul	United States	
Ruttman	Troy, Joe	United States	
de Sadeleer	Hugo, Jerome	Switzerland	
Sadler	Hermie, Elliott	United States	
Sargeant	Dalton, Logan	United States	
Scheckter	Ian, Jody	South Africa	
Scheckter	Tomas, Toby	South Africa	Sons of Jody
Schell	Philippe, Harry	United States	
Schothorst	Pieter, Steijn, Freek	Netherlands	
Schumacher	Michael, Ralf	Germany	
Sieg	Ryan, Shane, Kyle	United States	
Simo	Brian, Mark	United States	Twin brothers
Singh	Joginder, Jaswant	Kenya	
Simmons	Jeff, Chris	United States	
Skinner	Jamie, Dustin	United States	
Smith	Brad, Jeff	United States	
Smith/Taylor-Smith	Gavin, Árón	Ireland	Árón now competes under his married name
Sneva	Jerry, Jan, Tom	United States	
Solans	Nil, Jan	Spain	
Solberg	Henning, Petter	Norway	
Sørensen	Marco, Lasse	Denmark	
Sperafico	Ricardo, Rodrigo	Brazil	Twin brothers
Stewart	Jimmy, Jackie	United Kingdom	
Suenaga	Masao, Naoto	Japan	
Summers	Bob, Bill	United States	
Tandy	Nick, Joe	United Kingdom	
Teague	Al, Harvey	United States	
Thackwell	Mike, Lisa	New Zealand	
Theobald	Julian, Johannes	Germany	
Thomas	Herb, Donald	United States	
Toivonen	Henri, Harri	Finland	
Truex	Martin Jr., Ryan	United States	
Trintignant	Maurice, Louis	France	
Unser	Jerry, Louis, Joe	United States	
Unser	Louie, Jerry Jr., Bobby, Al	United States	
Unser	Bobby Jr., Robby, Jeri	United States	
Vanthoor	Laurens, Dries	Belgium	
Venturini	Billy, Wendy	United States	
Verstappen	Max, Victoria	Belgium, Netherlands	Max races under a Dutch license.
Vesco	Don, Rick	United States	
Vettel	Sebastian, Fabian	Germany	
Villeneuve	Gilles, Jacques (the brother)	Canada	
Villoresi	Luigi, Emilio	Italy	
de Villota	Emilio Jr., Maria	Spain	
de Vizcaya	Pierre, Fernando	Spain	
Voisin	Callum, Bailey	United Kingdom	
Wakisaka	Shigekazu, Juichi	Japan	
Wallace	Rusty, Mike, Kenny	United States	
Wallace	Chrissy, Matt	United States	
Waltrip	Darrell, Bobby, Michael	United States	Darrell and Michael both drove, but all three were involved in motorsport media as track announcers or broadcasters. Bobby's son Lee Bob has also been involved in track announcing at karting events.
Ware	Cody, Carson	United States	
Warwick	Derek, Paul	United Kingdom	
Whittington	Bill, Don, Dale	United States	
Wilson	Justin, Stefan	United Kingdom	
Wimmer	Chris, Scott	United States	
Winkelhock	Manfred, Joachim, Thomas	Germany	
Wood	Glen, Leonard	United States	Ever since these 2 brothers joined the sport back in 1950, Wood Brothers Racing is currently the oldest active team in NASCAR history. Prior to this, Petty Enterprises was the oldest team since the inaugural season in 1949, but the team folded after their 60th season back in 2008.
Wurz	Charlie, Oscar	Austria	

=== Half-siblings ===
Name	Name	Country	Related through	Notes
Walt Arfons	Art Arfons	United States	Mother	
José Dolhem	Didier Pironi	France	Same father, mothers were sisters	
António Félix da Costa	Duarte Félix da Costa	Portugal	Father	
Dale Earnhardt Jr.	Kerry Earnhardt	United States	Father	
Kelley Earnhardt Miller	Kerry Earnhardt	United States	Father	
Lewis Hamilton	Nicolas Hamilton	United Kingdom	Father	
Edward Muncey	Roger Norman	United States	Mother (Fran Muncey)	
Nelson Piquet Jr.	Geraldo Piquet	Brazil	Father	
Pedro Piquet	Geraldo Piquet	Brazil	Father	
Herbert Schnitzer; Josef Schnitzer	Dieter Lamm; Charly Lamm	Germany	Mother	
Graham Whitehead	Peter Whitehead	United Kingdom	Father	

== Parent-children ==
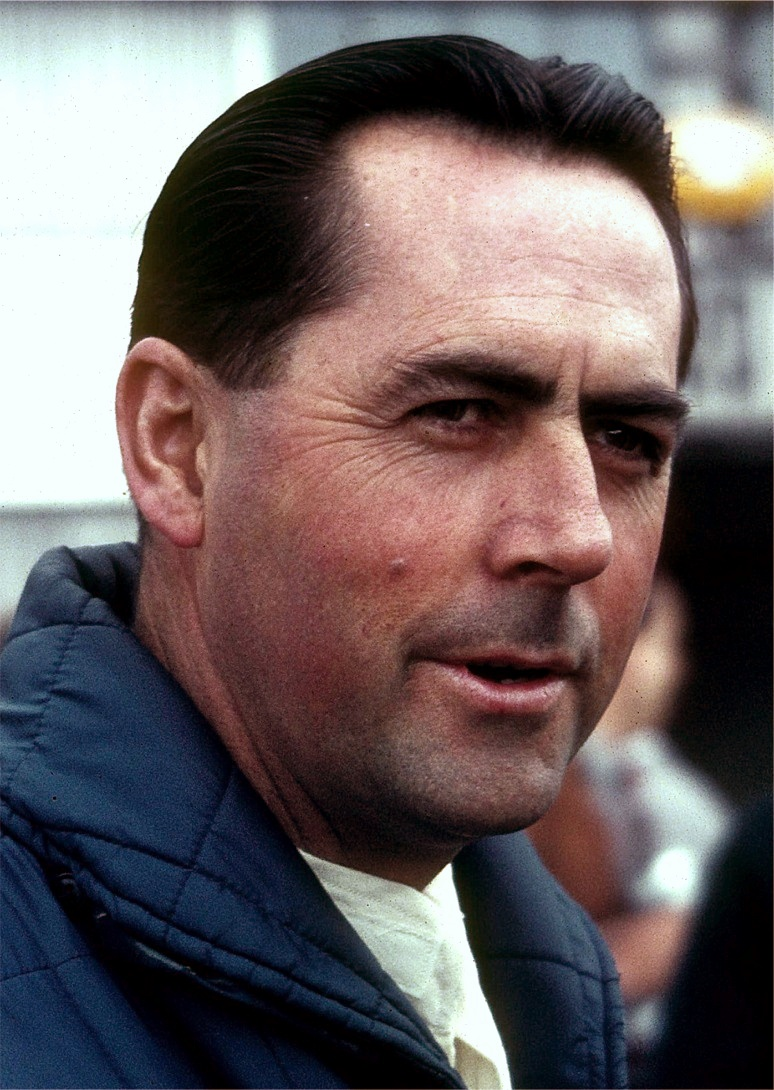
Three-time Formula One world champion Jack Brabham (pictured) established racing team Brabham, for which his son David would later race.

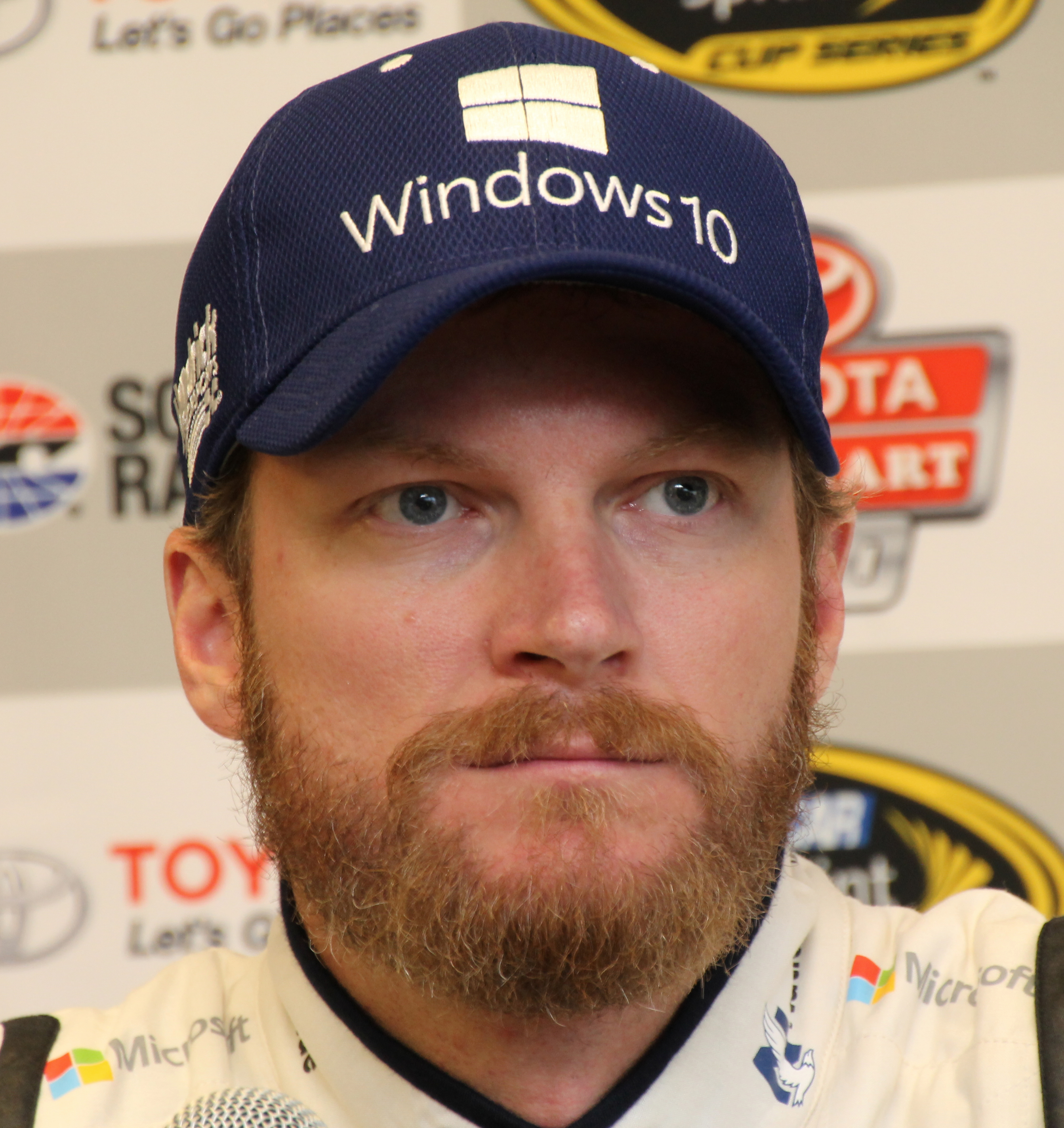
American NASCAR driver Dale Earnhardt suffered a fatal crash in the last corner of the 2001 Daytona 500, a race in which his son Dale Jr. (pictured) finished second.

Surname	Parent	Children	Country	Notes:
Aberdein	Chris	Jonathan	South Africa	
Abt	Johann	Hans-Jürgen	Germany	
Abt	Johann	Christian	Germany	
Abt	Hans-Jürgen	Daniel	Germany	
Ahrens	Kurt Sr.	Kurt Jr.	Germany	
Albon	Nigel	Alex	United Kingdom, Thailand	
Alén	Markku	Anton	Finland	
Alesi	Jean	Giuliano	France	
Allison	Bobby	Davey	United States	
Allison	Bobby	Clifford	United States	
Allison	Davey	Robbie	United States	
Ambrose	Ross	Marcos	Australia	
Anderson	Dennis	Adam	United States	
Anderson	Dennis	Krysten	United States	
Anderson	Dennis	Ryan	United States	
Andersson	Peggen	Per-Gunnar	Sweden	
Andretti	Mario	Michael	United States	
Andretti	Mario	Jeff	United States	
Andretti	Aldo	John	United States	
Andretti	Aldo	Adam	United States	
Andretti	Michael	Marco	United States	
Andretti	John	Jarett	United States	
Antonelli	Marco	Andrea Kimi	Italy	
Arrington	Buddy	Joey	United States	
Ascari	Antonio	Alberto	Italy	
Asch	Roland	Sebastian	Germany	
Arfons	Art	Tim	United States	
Arfons	Art	Dusty	United States	
Arfons	Walt	Craig	United States	
Badoer	Luca	Brando	Italy	
Bailey	Julian	Jack Clarke	United Kingdom	Stepfather
Baker	Buck	Buddy	United States	
Baker	Buck	Randy	United States	
Baldwin	Tom	Tommy Jr.	United States	
Bargwanna	Jason	Ben	Australia	
Barrett	Stan	Stanton	United States	
Barrichello	Rubens	Eduardo	Brazil	
Barrichello	Rubens	Fernando	Brazil	
Barth	Edgar	Jürgen	Germany	
Beadle	Raymond	Ryan	United States	Raymond was known as both an NHRA drag racer and a NASCAR team owner. Ryan, an attorney, is in management at JR Motorsports (Dale Earnhardt Jr.) as the team's General Counsel with both business and legal operations with the team.
Bell	Derek	Justin	United Kingdom	
Beltoise	Jean-Pierre	Anthony	France	
Bergmeister	Willi	Jörg	Germany	
Bergmeister	Willi	Tim	Germany	
Bernstein	Kenny	Brandon	United States	
Bettega	Attilio	Alessandro	Italy	
Bettenhausen	Tony	Gary	United States	
Bettenhausen	Tony	Tony Jr.	United States	
Bettenhausen	Tony	Merle	United States	
Blaney	Lou	Dale	United States	
Blaney	Lou	Dave	United States	
Blaney	Dave	Ryan	United States	
Bleekemolen	Michael	Jeroen	Netherlands	
Bleekemolen	Michael	Sebastiaan	Netherlands	
Blomqvist	Stig	Tom	Sweden, United Kingdom	
Boat	Billy	Chad	United States	
Bodine	Geoff	Barry	United States	
Bonnett	Neil	David	United States	
Bourdais	Patrick	Sébastien	France	
Boys	Trevor	Wheeler	Canada	
Brabham	Jack	Geoff	Australia	
Brabham	Jack	Gary	Australia	
Brabham	Jack	David	Australia	
Brabham	Geoff	Matthew	Australia	
Brabham	David	Sam	Australia	
Brayton	Lee	Scott	United States	
Brise	John	Tony	United Kingdom	
Brock	Peter	James	Australia	Stepson
Brundle	Martin	Alex	United Kingdom	
Bucknum	Ronnie	Jeff	United States	
Buford	James	Joe	United States	
Burgess	Sarah	Bridget	Australia	
Burton	Ward	Jeb	United States	
Burton	Jeff	Harrison	United States	
Button	John	Jenson	United Kingdom	
Buurman	Herman	Yelmer	Netherlands	
Caldarelli	Vitaliano	Andrea	Italy	
Campbell	Malcolm	Donald	United Kingdom	
Campos	Adrián	Adrián Jr.	Spain	
Canapino	Alberto	Agustin	Argentina	
Canapino	Alberto	Matías	Argentina	
Carter	Duane	Pancho	United States	
Carter	Travis	Matt	United States	
Cecotto	Johnny	Johnny Jr.	Venezuela	
Ceirano	Giovanni	Ernesto	Italy	
Charouz	Antonín	Jan	Czech Republic	
Charouz	Antonín	Petr	Czech Republic	
Cheever	Eddie	Eddie III	United States, Italy	
Churchill	Jerry	Randy	Canada	
Cindric	Tim	Austin	United States	
Clark	Roger	Matthew	United Kingdom	
Clark	Roger	Oliver	United Kingdom	
Collard	Rob	Ricky	United Kingdom	
Coloni	Enzo	Paolo	Italy	
Comas	Érik	Anthony	France	
Coronel	Tom Sr.	Tim	Netherlands	
Coronel	Tom Sr.	Tom	Netherlands	
Coughlin	Jeg Sr.	Jeg Jr.	United States	
Dallenbach	Wally Sr.	Wally Jr.	United States	
Dallenbach	Wally Sr.	Paul	United States	
Daly	Derek	Conor	Ireland, United States	
Davison	Lex	Richard	Australia	
Davison	Lex	Jon	Australia	
Davison	Richard	James	Australia	
Davison	Jon	Alex	Australia	
Davison	Jon	Will	Australia	
Davis	"Sammy"	Colin	United Kingdom	
Danielsson	Thomas	Alx	Sweden	
Deegan	Brian	Hailie	United States	
Délétraz	Jean-Denis	Louis	Switzerland	
Devore	Earl	Billy	United States	
Di Palma	Luis Rubén	José Luis	Argentina	
Di Palma	Luis Rubén	Patricio	Argentina	
Di Palma	Luis Rubén	Marcos	Argentina	
Di Palma	José Luis	Luis José	Argentina	
Di Palma	José Luis	Stéfano	Argentina	
Dick	Jimmy	Jamie	United States	
Dillon	Mike	Austin	United States	
Dillon	Mike	Ty	United States	
Donohue	Mark	David	United States	
Doran	Pat	Liam	United Kingdom	
Dotter	Bob	Bobby	United States	
Drudi	Luca	Mattia	Italy	
Dyson	Rob	Chris	United States	
Earnhardt	Ralph	Dale	United States	
Earnhardt	Dale	Dale Jr.	United States	
Earnhardt	Dale	Kerry	United States	
Earnhardt	Kerry	Bobby Dale	United States	
Earnhardt	Kerry	Jeffrey	United States	
Edwards	Guy	Sean	United Kingdom	
Elliott	Bill	Chase	United States	
Engstler	Franz	Luca	Germany	
Enjolras	Michel	Sébastien	France	
Enjolras	Michel	Pascal	France	
Eury	Tony	Tony Jr.	United States	
Evans	Gwyndaf	Elfyn	United Kingdom	
Evans	Walker	Evan	United States	
Fabi	Teo	Stefano	Italy	
Falk	Eddie	C. E.	United States	
Farnbacher	Horst	Dominik	Germany	
Farnbacher	Horst	Mario	Germany	
Felbermayr	Horst Sr.	Horst Jr.	Austria	
Felbermayr	Horst Jr.	Horst Felix	Austria	
Felbermayr	Horst Jr.	Emma	Austria	
Finch	James	Jake	United States	
Fiorio	Cesare	Alessandro	Italy	
Fittipaldi	Wilson	Christian	Brazil	
Fittipaldi	Emerson	Emerson Jr.	Brazil	
Flannery	Jack	Jamie	United States	
Flannery	Jack	Jed	United States	
Foitek	Karl	Gregor	Switzerland	
Force	John	Ashley	United States	
Force	John	Courtney	United States	
Force	John	Brittany	United States	
Foster	Nick	Louis	United Kingdom	
Frame	Fred	Bob	United States	
France	Bill Sr.	Bill Jr.	United States	
France	Bill Sr.	Jim	United States	
France	Bill Jr.	Brian	United States	
France	Bill Jr.	Lesa France Kennedy	United States	
France	Jim	J. C.	United States	
France	Lesa France Kennedy	Ben Kennedy	United States	
Friderich	Ernest	Renée	France	
Friderich	Ernest	Paul	France	
Gabbiani	Beppe	Gian Maria	Italy	
Gaughan	Michael	Brendan	United States	
Gaylord	Scott	Tripp	United States	
Gelael	Ricardo	Sean	Indonesia	
George	Elmer	Tony	United States	
George	Tony	Ed Carpenter	United States	Stepfather
Giaffone	Zeca	Felipe	Brazil	
Gibbs	Joe	Coy	United States	
Gibbs	Joe	J. D.	United States	
Gibbs	Coy	Ty	United States	
Gilliland	Butch	David	United States	
Gilliland	David	Todd	United States	
Goethe	Roald	Oliver	Germany, Denmark	
Goethe	Roald	Benjamin	Germany, Denmark	
Gordini	Amédée	Aldo	Italy	
Gordon	Huntley	Bob	United States	
Gordon	Bob	Robby	United States	
Gordon	Bob	Beccy	United States	
Gordon	Bob	Robyn	United States	
Gordon	Robby	Max	United States	
Gounon	Jean-Marc	Jules	France	
Graf	Peter	Klaus	Germany	
Grala	Darius	Kaz	Poland, United States	
Greaves	Johnny	C. J.	United States	
Gregg	Peter	Simon	United States	
Grönholm	Ulf	Marcus	Finland	
Grönholm	Marcus	Niclas	Finland	
Gushi	Tsukasa	Ken	Japan	
Guthrie	Jim	Sean	United States	
Gurney	Dan	Alex	United States	
Hahne	Hubert	Armin	Germany	
Hall	Jim	Jim II	United States	
Hall	Rod	Chad	United States	
Hall	Rod	Josh	United States	
Halliday	Don	Liz	United States	
Hamilton	Bobby	Bobby Jr.	United States	
Hamilton	Davey	Davey Jr.	United States	
Hansen	Kenneth	Kevin	Sweden	
Hansen	Kenneth	Timmy	Sweden	
Hartley	Ted	Gene	United States	
Hendrick	Rick	Ricky	United States	
Henn	Preston	Bonnie	United States	
Heimrath	Ludwig Sr.	Ludwig Jr.	Canada	
Herck	Andre	Michael	Belgium	
Herta	Bryan	Colton	United States	
Hezemans	Mathieu	Toine	Netherlands	
Hezemans	Toine	Mike	Netherlands	
Hezemans	Toine	Loris	Netherlands	
Hill	Graham	Damon	United Kingdom	
Hill	Damon	Josh	United Kingdom	
Hill	Jerry	Timmy	United States	
Hill	Jerry	Tyler	United States	
Hill	Phil	Derek	United States	
Hines	Martin	Marc	United Kingdom	
Hines	Martin	Luke	United Kingdom	
Holbert	Bob	Al	United States	
Holbert	Al	Todd	United States	
Hornaday	Ron Sr.	Ron Jr.	United States	
Hornaday	Ron Jr.	Ronnie	United States	
Hoshino	Kazuyoshi	Kazuki	Japan	
Houser	Thane	Norm	United States	
Houston	Tommy	Marty	United States	
Houston	Tommy	Andy	United States	
Huffman	Robert	Landon	United States	
Hunt	James	Freddie	United Kingdom	
Hyman	Christopher	Raoul	South Africa, United Kingdom	
Ickx	Jacques	Jacky	Belgium	
Ickx	Jacques	Pascal	Belgium	
Ickx	Jacky	Vanina	Belgium	
Jarrett	Ned	Dale	United States	
Jarrett	Ned	Glenn	United States	
Jarrett	Dale	Jason	United States	
Jenkins	Ab	Marvin	United States	
Johnson	Dick	Steven	Australia	
Johnson	Warren	Kurt	United States	
Jones	Parnelli	P. J.	United States	
Jones	Parnelli	Page	United States	
Jones	P. J.	Jagger	United States	
Jones	Stan	Alan	Australia	
Jones	Alan	Christian	Australia	Adopted
Jones	Brad	Macauley	Australia	
Jordan	Mike	Andy	United Kingdom	
Jourdain	Michel Sr.	Michel Jr.	Mexico	
Kalitta	Connie	Scott	United States	
Kaye	Peter	James	United Kingdom	
Kaye	Peter	Richard	United Kingdom	
Kelleners	Helmut	Ralf	Germany	
Kendall	Chuck	Tommy	United States	
Kenseth	Matt	Ross	United States	
Keselowski	Bob	Brad	United States	
Keselowski	Bob	Brian	United States	
Kinser	Bob	Steve	United States	
Kinser	Steve	Kraig	United States	
Koolen	Kees	Niels	Netherlands	
Kościuszko	Jan	Michał	Poland	
Kox	Peter	Stéphane	Netherlands	
Krisiloff	Steve	Kyle	United States	
Kristoffersson	Tommy	Johan	Sweden	
Kumpen	Paul	Anthony	Belgium	
Kunimoto	Yoshihiro	Keisuke	Japan	
Kunimoto	Yoshihiro	Yuji	Japan	
Kurosawa	Motoharu	Takuya	Japan	
Kurosawa	Motoharu	Haruki	Japan	
Kurosawa	Motoharu	Tsubasa	Japan	
Kvapil	Travis	Carson	United States	
Kvapil	Travis	Caden	United States	
Labonte	Terry	Justin	United States	
Lafargue	Patrice	Paul	France	
Laffite	Jacques	Camille	France	
Laffite	Jacques	Margot	France	
Lagasse	Scott	Scott Jr.	United States	
LaJoie	Randy	Corey	United States	
Larsson	Lars	Robin	Sweden	
Lauda	Niki	Mathias	Austria	
Lazier	Bob	Buddy	United States	
Lazier	Bob	Jaques	United States	
Lazier	Buddy	Flinn	United States	
Lechner	Walter	Robert	Austria	
Lechner	Walter	Walter Jr.	Austria	
Leguizamón	Alejandro	Baltazar	Argentina	
Leitzinger	Bob	Butch	United States	
Lienhard	Fredy Sr.	Fredy Jr.	Switzerland	
van der Linde	Hennie	Etienne	South Africa	
Lindgren	Nettan	Caroline Jansson	Sweden	
Lindholm	Sebastian	Emil	Finland	
Little	Chad	Jesse	United States	
López	Osvaldo	Juan Manuel	Argentina	
Lowndes	Frank	Craig	Australia	
Lundgaard	Henrik	Christian	Denmark	
Luyendyk	Arie	Arie Jr.	Netherlands	
Lyons	Judy	Michael	United Kingdom	
Lyons	Frank	Michael	United Kingdom	
Macrow	Peter	Adam	Australia	
Macrow	Peter	Tim	Australia	
Magnussen	Jan	Kevin	Denmark	
Mallock	Arthur	Ray	United Kingdom	
Mallock	Arthur	Richard	United Kingdom	
Mansell	Nigel	Greg	United Kingdom	All three competed for the same team at the 2010 24 Hours of Le Mans.
Mansell	Nigel	Leo	United Kingdom	All three competed for the same team at the 2010 24 Hours of Le Mans.
Marlin	Clifton	Sterling	United States	
Marlin	Sterling	Steadman	United States	
Marshall	Gerry	Gregor	United Kingdom	
Martin	Mark	Matt	United States	
Mayer	Scott	Sam	United States	
Mayer	Teddy	Tim	United States	
Mazzacane	Hugo	Gaston	Argentina	
McCreadie	Bob	Tim	United States	
McElreath	Jim	James	United States	
McLaughlin	Mike	Max	United States	
McMillin	Corky	Mark	United States	
McMillin	Corky	Scott	United States	
McMillin	Mark	Daniel	United States	
McMillin	Mark	Luke	United States	
McMillin	Scott	Andy	United States	
McRae	Jimmy	Colin	United Kingdom	
McRae	Jimmy	Alister	United Kingdom	
McReynolds	Larry	Brandon	United States	
Mears	Roger	Casey	United States	
Mears	Rick	Clint	United States	
van Merksteijn	Peter Sr.	Peter Jr.	Netherlands	
Millen	Rod	Rhys	New Zealand, United States	Rod and Rhys are New Zealand born and Ryan is US born
Millen	Rod	Ryan	New Zealand, United States	Rod and Rhys are New Zealand born and Ryan is US born
Miller	Dr. Jack	Jack William	United States	
Minshaw	Alan	Jason	United Kingdom	
Moffat	Allan	James	Canada, Australia	Stepbrothers; Allan is Canadian
Moffat	Allan	Andrew	Canada, Australia	Stepbrothers; Allan is Canadian
Montoya	Juan Pablo	Sebastián	Colombia	
Moore	Kelly	Ryan	United States	
Moran	Rocky	Rocky Jr.	United States	
Moroso	Dick	Rob	United States	
Morris	Paul	Nash	Australia	
Moss	Alfred	Stirling	United Kingdom	
Moss	Alfred	Pat	United Kingdom	
Mücke	Peter	Stefan	Germany	
Muller	Cathy	Yann Ehrlacher	France	
Myers	Bobby	Danny	United States	Bobby was a racing driver, Danny, nicknamed "Chocolate," is best known as a mechanic.
Nakajima	Satoru	Kazuki	Japan	
Nakajima	Satoru	Daisuke	Japan	
Neal	Steve	Matt	United Kingdom	
Negrão	Xandy	Alexandre Sarnes	Brazil	
Nemechek	Joe	John Hunter	United States	
Newey	Adrian	Harrison	United Kingdom	
Nielsen	Lars Erik	Christina	Denmark	
Nissany	Chanoch	Roy	Israel	
Noda	Hideki	Juju	Japan	
von Opel	Fritz	Rikky	Germany, Liechtenstein	
O'dor	Jan	Kieth	United Kingdom	
Pabst	Augie	Augie III	United States	
Palmer	Jonathan	Jolyon	United Kingdom	
Palmer	Jonathan	Will	United Kingdom	
Panch	Marvin	Richie	United States	
Panis	Olivier	Aurélien	France	
Pardus	Dan	Preston	United States	
Parnell	Reg	Tim	United Kingdom	
Parsons	Johnnie	Johnny	United States	
Parsons	Phil	Stefan	United States	
Patrese	Riccardo	Lorenzo	Italy	
Paul	John Sr.	John Jr.	United States	John Sr. is Dutch born with US citizenship, whereas John Jr. is US born
Pearson	David	Larry	United States	
Pedroncelli	Paul	P.J.	United States	
Penske	Roger	Jay	United States	
Perkins	Larry	Jack	Australia	
Pernía	Vicente	Leonel	Argentina	
Peter	Peter	Philipp	Austria	
Petiz	Jorge	Pedro	Portugal	
Petiz	Jorge	Tiago	Portugal	
Petty	Lee	Richard	United States	
Petty	Lee	Maurice	United States	
Petty	Richard	Kyle	United States	
Petty	Maurice	Ritchie	United States	
Petty	Kyle	Adam	United States	
Pietsch	Paul	Peter-Paul	Germany	
Pilette	Théodore	André	Belgium	
Pilette	André	Teddy	Belgium	
Piquet	Nelson	Nelson Jr.	Brazil	
Piquet	Nelson	Pedro	Brazil	
Piquet	Nelson	Geraldo	Brazil	
Power	Bob	Will	Australia	
Pressley	Robert	Coleman	United States	
Prette	Philippe	Louis	Monaco	
Priaulx	Andy	Sebastian	United Kingdom	
Price	Drew	Shane	Australia	
Proctor	Mark	Senna	United Kingdom	
Proulx	Monique	Stéphane	Canada	
Quaife	Rod	Mike	United Kingdom	
Quaife	Mike	Phil	United Kingdom	
Al Qubaisi	Khalid	Amna	United Arab Emirates	
Al Qubaisi	Khalid	Hamda	United Arab Emirates	
Prost	Alain	Nicolas	France	
Radisich	Frank	Paul	New Zealand	
Ragan	Ken	David	United States	
Ragland	Larry	Chad	United States	
Rahal	Bobby	Graham	United States	
Rautenbach	Billy	Conrad	Zimbabwe	
Ray	Johnny	Kevin	United States	
Reed	Mark	Ryan	United States	
Rice	Bob	Larry	United States	
Richards	Jim	Steven	New Zealand	
Richelmi	Jean-Pierre	Stéphane	Monaco	
Ried	Christian	Jonas, Lenny	Germany	
Riggs	Scott	Layne	United States	
Risatti	Ricardo I	Ricardo II	Argentina	
Risatti	Ricardo II	Ricardo III	Argentina	
de Rooy	Jan	Gerard	Netherlands	
Roper	Dean	Tony	United States	
Rosberg	Keke	Nico	Finland, Germany	Nico Rosberg is the son of Keke Rosberg and his German wife Sina. He races with a German racing license.
Rosier	Louis	Jean-Louis	France	
Rossiter	Jeremy	James	United Kingdom	
Rovanperä	Harri	Kalle	Finland	
Russo	Joe	Eddie	United States	
Said	Bob	Boris	United States	
Sainz	Carlos	Carlos Jr.	Spain	
Saldana	Joe	Joey	United States	
Salo	Mika	Max	Finland	
Sauter	Jim	Jay	United States	
Sauter	Jim	Tim	United States	
Sauter	Jim	Johnny	United States	
Sauter	Tim	Travis	United States	
Scelzi	Gary	Gio	United States	
Scheckter	Jody	Tomas	South Africa	
Scheckter	Jody	Toby	South Africa	
Scheckter	Ian	Jaki	South Africa	
Schell	Lucy	Harry	United States	
Schell	Laury	Harry	United States	
Schumacher	Michael	Mick	Germany	Mick is Swiss born
Schumacher	Ralf	David	Germany	
Sears	Jack	David	United Kingdom	
Serra	Chico	Daniel	Brazil	
Servià	Salvador	Oriol	Spain	
Seton	Barry	Glenn	Australia	
Seton	Glenn	Aaron	Australia	
Shafer	Todd	Jonathan	United States	
Sharp	Bob	Scott	United States	
Shaw	Wilbur	Bill	United States	
Siffert	Jo	Philippe	Switzerland	
Simpson	Bill	Mark	United States	
Skaife	Russell	Mark	Australia	
Skinner	Mike	Jamie	United States	
Skinner	Mike	Dustin	United States	
Smith	Jeff	Brett	United Kingdom	
Solberg	Henning	Pontus Tidemand	Norway, Sweden	Stepfather
Solberg	Petter	Oliver	Norway, Sweden	
Sosebee	Gober	David	United States	
Spencer	Ed	Jimmy	United States	
Stewart	Jackie	Paul	United Kingdom	
Stroll	Lawrence	Lance	Canada	
Stuck	Hans	Hans-Joachim	Germany	
Stuck	Hans-Joachim	Johannes	Germany	
Stuck	Hans-Joachim	Ferdinand	Germany	
Sunako	Yoshikazu	Tomohiko	Japan	
Surtees	John	Henry	United Kingdom	
Swift	Russ	Paul	United Kingdom	
Swindell	Sammy	Kevin	United States	
Sztuka	Łukasz	Kacper	Poland	
Tachi	Nobuhide	Shingo	Japan	
Tambay	Patrick	Adrien	France	
Tanner	Kelly	Tyler	United States	
Taruffi	Piero	Prisca	Italy	
Taylor	Coral	Molly	Australia	
Taylor	Geoffrey	Michael	United Kingdom	
Taylor	Wayne	Ricky	United States	Wayne was born in South Africa, Ricky in the United Kingdom, and Jordan in the United States. All are now US citizens.
Taylor	Wayne	Jordan	United States	Wayne was born in South Africa, Ricky in the United Kingdom, and Jordan in the United States. All are now US citizens.
Thackwell	Ray	Mike	New Zealand	
Thackwell	Ray	Lisa	New Zealand	
Thiim	Kurt	Nicki	Denmark	
Thompson	Mickey	Danny	United States	
Toivonen	Pauli	Henri	Finland	
Toivonen	Pauli	Harri	Finland	
Trickle	Chuck	Chris	United States	
Truex	Martin	Martin Jr.	United States	
Truex	Martin	Ryan	United States	
Trulli	Jarno	Enzo	Italy	
Tsuchiya	Haruo	Takeshi	Japan	
Unser	Jerry	Al	United States	
Unser	Jerry	Jerry Jr.	United States	
Unser	Jerry	Bobby	United States	
Unser	Jerry	Louie	United States	
Unser	Al	Al Jr.	United States	
Unser	Bobby	Robby	United States	
Unser	Bobby	Bobby Jr.	United States	
Unser	Bobby	Jeri	United States	
Unser	Jerry Jr.	Johnny	United States	
Unser	Al Jr.	Al III	United States	
Vanden Heuvel	Dan Sr.	Mike	United States	
Vanden Heuvel	Dan Sr.	Dan Jr.	United States	
Vesnić	Milun	Milovan	Yugoslavia, Serbia	
Venturini	Bill	Billy	United States	
Venturini	Bill	Wendy	United States	
Verstappen	Jos	Max	Netherlands, Belgium	
Verstappen	Sophie Kumpen	Max	Netherlands, Belgium	
Vildósola	Gus	Tavo	Mexico	
Villeneuve	Gilles	Jacques	Canada	
de Villota	Emilio	Emilio Jr.	Spain	
de Villota	Emilio	Maria	Spain	
Vukovich	Bill	Bill II	United States	
Vukovich	Bill II	Bill III	United States	
Walkinshaw	Tom	Fergus	United Kingdom	
Walkinshaw	Tom	Sean	United Kingdom	
Wallace	Rusty	Steve	United States	
Wallace	Mike	Chrissy	United States	
Wallace	Mike	Matt	United States	
Ware	Rick	Cody	United States	
Ware	Rick	Carson	United States	
Warmbold	Achim	Anthony	Germany	
Wheldon	Dan	Sebastian	United Kingdom	
Whittington	R.D.	Bill	United States	
Whittington	R.D.	Don	United States	
Whittington	R.D.	Dale	United States	
Williams	Frank	Claire	United Kingdom	
Wilson	Malcolm	Matthew	United Kingdom	
Winkelhock	Manfred	Markus	Germany	
Winterbottom	Jim	Mark	Australia	
Wittmann	Franz Sr.	Franz Jr.	Austria	
Wurz	Franz	Alexander	Austria	
Wurz	Alexander	Charlie	Austria	
Yanagida	Haruto	Masataka	Japan	
Zborowski	Eliott	Louis	United Kingdom	Eliott is US born with British citizenship
Zeller	Jo	Sandro	Switzerland	
Zwolsman	Charles	Charles Jr.	Netherlands	
Zwolsman	Charles	Ross	Netherlands	

== Spouses and domestic partners ==
Spouse #1	Spouse #2	Country	Notes:
David Brabham	Lisa Thackwell	Australia, New Zealand	
Enzo Calderari	Lilian Bryner	Switzerland	Long-term relationship, never married
Erik Carlsson	Pat Moss	Sweden, United Kingdom	
Jennifer Jo Cobb	Eddie Troconis	United States, Mexico	Currently separated
Bob Chandler	Marilyn Chandler	United States	
Sara Christian	Frank Christian	United States	
Wally Dallenbach Jr.	Robin McCall	United States	
Kelly Earnhardt Miller	L.W. Miller	United States	
Ray Evernham	Erin Crocker	United States	
Courtney Force	Graham Rahal	United States	
Stewart Friesen	Jessica Friesen	Canada, United States	
Fred Gibson	Christine Gibson	Australia	
Peter Gregg	Deborah Gregg	United States	Widowed shortly following marriage, Deborah has since remarried
Gwenda Hawkes	Douglas Hawkes	United Kingdom	
Ludwig Heimrath	Kathy Rude	Canada, United States	
Daniel Hemric	Kenzie Ruston Hemric	United States	
Mike Hiss	Arlene Hiss	United States	Divorced
Ryan Hunter-Reay	Beccy Gordon	United States	
Patric Niederhauser	Marylin Niederhauser	Switzerland	
Débora Rodrigues	Renato Martins	Brazil	
Ewy Rosqvist-von Korff	Yngve Rosqvist	Sweden	
Elton Sawyer	Patty Moise	United States	
Sabine Schmitz	Klaus Abbelen	Germany	
Tony Stewart	Leah Pruett	United States	
Amanda Stretton	Martin Stretton	United Kingdom	Divorced from Stretton, has since been remarried to Berridge
Amanda Stretton	Bob Berridge	United Kingdom	Divorced from Stretton, has since been remarried to Berridge
Christina Surer	Marc Surer	Switzerland, Germany	Divorced from Surer, has since been remarried to Tomczyk
Christina Surer	Martin Tomczyk	Switzerland, Germany	Divorced from Surer, has since been remarried to Tomczyk
Garth Tander	Leanne Ferrier	Australia	Married 2005, divorced 2022. Garth (1997) and Leanne (2016) both won the Australian Formula Ford Championship.
Mark Taylor	Coral Taylor	Australia	
Alejandro de Tomaso	Isabelle Haskell	Argentina, United States	
Jos Verstappen	Sophie Kumpen	Netherlands, Belgium	Divorced
Danny Watts	Fiona Leggate	United Kingdom	Divorced, Watts later came out as gay
Susie Wolff	Toto Wolff	United Kingdom, Austria	
Chase Cabre	Hailie Deegan	United States	

Italics indicate dissolved relationship.

== Grandparent-grandchildren ==
Grandparent	Grandchildren	Country	Notes
Mario Andretti	Marco Andretti	United States	
Aldo Andretti	Jarett Andretti	United States	
Buck Baker	Randy Baker	United States	
Mauro Bianchi	Jules Bianchi	Belgium, France	Mauro was Italian by birth, but along with his brother Lucien, raced under the Belgian flag. Jules was French by birth and nationality
Lou Blaney	Ryan Blaney	United States	
Jack Brabham	Matthew Brabham	Australia; United States; United Kingdom	Matthew born in Boca Raton, FL, USA.
Jack Brabham	Sam Brabham	Australia; United States; United Kingdom	Sam was born in Slough, UK.
Donald Campbell	Don Wales	United Kingdom	
Richard Childress	Austin Dillon	United States	
Richard Childress	Ty Dillon	United States	
Jack Choquette	Jeff Choquette	United States	
Briggs Cunningham	Brian Cunningham	United States	
Bay Darnell	Erik Darnell	United States	
Lex Davison	Will Davison	Australia	
Lex Davison	Alex Davison	Australia	
Lex Davison	James Davison	Australia	
Dale Earnhardt	Bobby Dale Earnhardt	United States	(Kerry's son)
Dale Earnhardt	Jeffrey Earnhardt	United States	(Kerry's son)
Dale Earnhardt	Karsyn Elledge	United States	(Kelley's daughter)
Ralph Earnhardt	Kerry Earnhardt	United States	
Ralph Earnhardt	Dale Earnhardt Jr.	United States	
Emerson Fittipaldi	Pietro Fittipaldi	Brazil	
Emerson Fittipaldi	Enzo Fittipaldi	Brazil	
A. J. Foyt (Jr.)	Larry Foyt	United States	Larry is a grandson by birth, but is also the adopted son of A. J.
A. J. Foyt (Jr.)	A. J. Foyt IV	United States	Larry is a grandson by birth, but is also the adopted son of A. J.
Bill France Sr.	Brian France	United States	
Bill France Sr.	Lesa France Kennedy	United States	
Bill France Sr.	J. C. France	United States	
Bill France Jr.	Ben Kennedy	United States	
Joe Gibbs	Ty Gibbs	United States	
Butch Gilliland	Todd Gilliland	United States	
Huntley Gordon	Robby Gordon	United States	
Huntley Gordon	Beccy Gordon	United States	Husband is Ryan Hunter-Reay
Huntley Gordon	Robyn Gordon	United States	
Mathieu Hezemans	Loris Hezemans	Netherlands	
Mathieu Hezemans	Mike Hezemans	Netherlands	
Ron Hornaday Sr.	Ronnie Hornaday	United States	
Jacques Ickx	Vanina Ickx	Belgium	
Ned Jarrett	Jason Jarrett	United States	
Parnelli Jones	Jagger Jones	United States	
Freddy Kottulinsky	Mikaela Åhlin-Kottulinsky	Germany, Sweden	
Bob Lazier	Flinn Lazier	United States	
Dries van der Lof	Shirley van der Lof	Netherlands	
Billy Myers	Burt Myers	United States	Bobby and Billy Myers were brothers whose memory is preserved in NASCAR's Myers Brothers Award. Billy's son Gary also won the Modified championship at Bowman Gray Stadium, and is the father of both Burt and Jason.
Billy Myers	Jason Myers	United States	
Lee Petty	Kyle Petty	United States	
Lee Petty	Ritchie Petty	United States	
Richard Petty	Adam Kyler Petty (Kyle's son)	United States	Adam was Kyle's son. (Adam's brother Austin named his first son in memory of his brother, Adam Stone Petty.) Thad is Rebecca's son.
Richard Petty	Thad Moffitt	United States	Adam was Kyle's son. (Adam's brother Austin named his first son in memory of his brother, Adam Stone Petty.) Thad is Rebecca's son.
Théodore Pilette	Teddy Pilette	Belgium	
Tom Pistone	Chase Pistone	United States	
Rod Quaife	Phil Quaife	United Kingdom	
Ricardo Risatti I	Ricardo Risatti III	Argentina	
Barry Seton	Aaron Seton	Australia	
Al Unser	Jason Tanner	United States	
Al Unser	Al Unser III	United States	
Glen Wood	Jon Wood	United States	

== Uncle-nibling ==
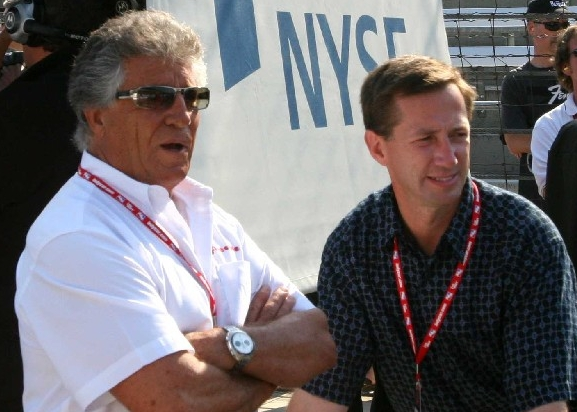
Mario Andretti (left) is the uncle of John Andretti (right)

Uncle	Nephew/niece	Country	Notes
Christian Abt	Daniel Abt	Germany	
Donnie Allison	Davey Allison	United States	
Donnie Allison	Clifford Allison	United States	
Aldo Andretti	Michael Andretti	United States	
Aldo Andretti	Jeff Andretti	United States	
Mario Andretti	John Andretti	United States	
Mario Andretti	Adam Andretti	United States	
Adam Andretti	Jarett Andretti	United States	
Antonio Ascari	Giovanni Minozzi	Italy	
Gerhard Berger	Lucas Auer	Austria	
Hans Binder	Rene Binder	Austria	
Dale Blaney	Ryan Blaney	United States	
Brett Bodine	Barry Bodine	United States	
Todd Bodine	Barry Bodine	United States	
Robin Brundle	Alex Brundle	United Kingdom	
Ward Burton	Harrison Burton	United States	
Jeff Burton	Jeb Burton	United States	
Eddie Cheever	Richard Antinucci	United States	
Ross Cheever	Eddie Cheever III	United States, Italy	
Carlos Contreras	Enrique Contreras III	Mexico	
Derrike Cope	Angela Cope	United States	
Derrike Cope	Amber Cope	United States	
Jeg Coughlin Jr.	Cody Coughlin	United States	
Pedro de la Rosa	Bruno del Pino	Spain	
José Luis Di Palma	Juan Cruz Di Palma	Argentina	
Patricio Di Palma	Juan Cruz Di Palma	Argentina	
Marcos Di Palma	Juan Cruz Di Palma	Argentina	
John DePalma	Pete DePaolo	United States	
Ralph DePalma	Pete DePaolo	United States	
Sérgio Drugovich	Felipe Drugovich	Brazil	
Oswaldo Drugovich Jr.	Felipe Drugovich	Brazil	
Dale Earnhardt Jr.	Bobby Dale Earnhardt	United States	
Dale Earnhardt Jr.	Jeffrey Earnhardt	United States	
Bill Elliott	Casey Elliott	United States	
Joe Falk	C. E. Falk	United States	
Juan Manuel Fangio	Juan Manuel Fangio II	Argentina	
Emerson Fittipaldi	Christian Fittipaldi	Brazil	
Fred Frame	Chuck Frame	United States	
Jim France	Brian France	United States	
Jim France	Lesa France Kennedy	United States	
Bill France Jr.	J. C. France	United States	
Brian France	Ben Kennedy	United States	
Zeca Giaffone	Affonso Giaffone	Brazil	
J. D. Gibbs	Ty Gibbs	United States	
Benny Gordon	Andrew Gordon	United States	
Hubert Hahne	Jörg van Ommen	Germany	
Armin Hahne	Jörg van Ommen	Germany	
G.G. Hartley	Gene Hartley	United States	
Helmut Henzler	Wolf Henzler	Germany	
Glenn Jarrett	Jason Jarrett	United States	
Brad Jones	Andrew Jones	Australia	
Bernard Jourdain	Michel Jourdain Jr.	Mexico	
Connie Kalitta	Doug Kalitta	United States	
Ron Keselowski	Brad Keselowski	United States	
Ron Keselowski	Brian Keselowski	United States	
Frank Kimmel	Will Kimmel	United States	
Bobby Labonte	Justin Labonte	United States	
Danny Lasoski	Brian Brown	United States	
Jaques Lazier	Flinn Lazier	United States	
Etienne van der Linde	Kelvin van der Linde	South Africa	
Etienne van der Linde	Sheldon van der Linde	South Africa	
Karel Loprais	Aleš Loprais	Czech Republic	
Jan Magnussen	Dennis Lind	Denmark	
Giancarlo Martini	Pierluigi Martini	Italy	
Giancarlo Martini	Oliver Martini	Italy	
Timmy Mayer	Tim Mayer	United States	
Rick Mears	Casey Mears	United States	
Steve Millen	Rhys Millen	New Zealand	
Steve Millen	Ryan Millen	New Zealand	
Kenper Miller	Bryce Miller	United States	
Yvan Muller	Yann Ehrlacher	France	
Felice Nazzaro	Biagio Nazzaro	Italy	
John Nemechek	John Hunter Nemechek	United States	
Benny Parsons	Stefan Parsons	United States	
Tom Peck	Todd Peck	United States	
Luis Pérez Companc	Ezequiel Pérez Companc	Argentina	
Pablo Pérez Companc	Ezequiel Pérez Companc	Argentina	
Luis Pérez Sala	Daniel Juncadella	Spain	
Alcides Petiz	Pedro Petiz	Portugal	
Alcides Petiz	Tiago Petiz	Portugal	
Rod Quaife	Adrian Quaife-Hobbs	United Kingdom	
Michael Roe	James Roe Jr.	Ireland	
Yoshihiko Ri	Keisuke Kunimoto	Japan	
Yoshihiko Ri	Yuji Kunimoto	Japan	
Ricky Rudd	Jason Rudd	United States	
Paul Russo	Eddie Russo	United States	
Max Sailer	Karl Sailer	Germany	
Johnny Sauter	Travis Sauter	United States	
Jay Sauter	Travis Sauter	United States	
Ian Scheckter	Tomas Scheckter	South Africa	
Ian Scheckter	Toby Scheckter	South Africa	
Jody Scheckter	Jaki Scheckter	South Africa	
Jo Schlesser	Jean-Louis Schlesser	France	
Michael Schumacher	David Schumacher	Germany	
Ralf Schumacher	Mick Schumacher	Germany	
Ayrton Senna	Bruno Senna	Brazil	
Josep Maria Servià	Oriol Servià	Spain	
Jack Smith	Tommy Smith	Australia	
Jim Smith	Zane Smith	United States	
Henning Solberg	Oliver Solberg	Norway, Sweden	
Jimmy Stewart	Paul Stewart	United Kingdom	
Dick Trickle	Chris Trickle	United States	
Louis Unser	Al Unser	United States	
Louis Unser	Jerry Unser	United States	
Louis Unser	Bobby Unser	United States	
Jacques Villeneuve	Jacques Villeneuve	Canada	
Rusty Wallace	Chrissy Wallace	United States	
Kenny Wallace	Chrissy Wallace	United States	
Mike Wallace	Steve Wallace	United States	
Kenny Wallace	Steve Wallace	United States	
Joachim Winkelhock	Markus Winkelhock	Germany	
Thomas Winkelhock	Markus Winkelhock	Germany	

== Cousins ==
Cousin	Cousin	Country	Notes
Michael Andretti; Jeff Andretti	John Andretti; Adam Andretti	United States	
Alberto Ascari	Giovanni Minozzi	Italy	
Barry Bodine	Josh Richeson	United States	
Eric Bodine	Geoff Bodine	United States	
Eric Bodine	Brett Bodine	United States	
Eric Bodine	Todd Bodine	United States	
Matthew Brabham	Sam Brabham	Australia	
Sébastien Buemi	Natacha Gachnang	Switzerland	
James Buescher	Chris Buescher	United States	
Jeb Burton	Harrison Burton	United States	
Giuseppe Campari	Eugenio Siena	Italy	
Adam Christodoulou	Riki Christodoulou	United Kingdom	
David Coulthard	Fabian Coulthard	United Kingdom, New Zealand	Second cousin
Derrike Cope	Ernie Cope	United States	
James Davison	Alex Davison	Australia	
James Davison	Will Davison	Australia	
Dale Earnhardt Jr.	Tony Eury Jr.	United States	
Jonny Edgar	Jessica Edgar	United Kingdom	
Carl Edwards	Ken Schrader	United States	First cousins, once removed
Chase Elliott	Casey Elliott	United States	
Jimmy van der Ende	Jacky van der Ende	Netherlands	
Jimmy van der Ende	Ricardo van der Ende	Netherlands	
Chris Fontaine	Justin Fontaine	United States	
J. C. France	Brian France	United States	
J. C. France	Lesa France Kennedy	United States	
Affonso Giaffone	Felipe Giaffone	Brazil	
Helm Glöckler	Walter Glöckler	Germany	
Jeff Gordon	James Bickford	United States	
Marcus Grönholm	Sebastian Lindholm	Finland	
Marco Holzer	Thomas Holzer	Germany	
Andrew Jones	Macauley Jones	Australia	
Scott Kalitta	Doug Kalitta	United States	
Steve Kinser	Mark Kinser	United States	Third cousins, once removed
Kraig Kinser	Mark Kinser	United States	Fourth cousins
Jordan Kinser	Kody Kinser	United States	Sixth cousins
Brodie Kostecki	Jake Kostecki	Australia	
Brodie Kostecki	Kurt Kostecki	Australia	
Anthony Kumpen	Sophie Kumpen	Belgium	
Kevin Magnussen	Dennis Lind	Denmark	
Pastor Maldonado	Manuel Maldonado	Venezuela	
Casey Mears	Clint Mears	United States	
Paul Menard	Charlie Menard	United States	
Alessandro Nannini	Matteo Nannini	Italy	First cousins, once removed
Kyle Petty	Ritchie Petty	United States	
Mike Quaife	Adrian Quaife-Hobbs	United Kingdom	
Paul di Resta	Dario Franchitti	United Kingdom	
Paul di Resta	Marino Franchitti	United Kingdom	
David Schumacher	Mick Schumacher	Germany	
Alex Sperafico	Rafael Sperafico	Brazil	
Alex Sperafico	Ricardo Sperafico	Brazil	
Alex Sperafico	Rodrigo Sperafico	Brazil	
Jason Unser	Al Unser III	United States	
Steve Wallace	Chrissy Wallace	United States	
Brandon Whitt	Cole Whitt	United States	
Jon Wood	Keven Wood	United States	

== In-laws ==
In-law	In-law	Country	Notes
Donnie Allison	Hut Stricklin	United States	Father-in-law; Stricklin married Allison's daughter Pam.
Jérôme d'Ambrosio	Ferdinand Habsburg	Belgium, Austria	Brothers-in-law; d'Ambrosio married Habsburg's sister Eleonore.
Jordan Anderson	Larry McReynolds	United States	Father-in-law; Anderson married McReynolds' daughter Kendall.
Jordan Anderson	Brandon McReynolds	United States	Brothers-in-law; Anderson married McReynolds' sister Kendall.
Jordan Anderson	Austin Wayne Self	United States	Brothers-in-law; Self married Anderson's sister Jennifer.
Rubens Barrichello	Felipe Giaffone	Brazil	Cousins-in-law; Barrichello's wife is a cousin of Giaffone.
Jean-Pierre Beltoise	François Cevert	France	Brothers-in-law; Beltoise married Cevert's sister, Jacqueline Cevert.
Ryan Blaney	Cale Conley	United States	Brothers-in-law; Conley married Blaney's sister Emma.
David Brabham	Mike Thackwell	Australia, New Zealand	Brothers-in-law; Brabham married Thackwell's sister Lisa.
Erik Carlsson	Stirling Moss	Sweden, United Kingdom	Brothers-in-law; Carlsson married Moss' sister Pat Moss.
Richard Childress	Mike Dillon	United States	Father-in-law; Dillon married Childress' daughter Tina.
Terry Cook	Bobby East	United States	Brothers-in-law; Cook married East's sister Amy.
Sheldon Creed	Phil Parsons	United States	Father-in-law; Creed married Parsons' daughter Cami.
Sheldon Creed	Stefan Parsons	United States	Brothers-in-law; Creed married Parsons' twin sister Cami.
Ed Flemke Jr.	Ron Bouchard	United States	Brothers-in-law; Bouchard married Flemke's sister Paula.
John Force	Robert Hight	United States	Father-in-law; Hight married Force's eldest daughter, Adria.
John Force	Graham Rahal	United States	Father-in-law; Rahal married Force's youngest daughter, Courtney.
Manuel Gião	Lourenço Beirão da Veiga	Portugal	Brothers-in-law; Gião married Beirão da Veiga's sister.
Mark Gibson	Curtis Crider	United States	Father-in-law; Gibson married Crider's daughter Jan.
Mario Gosselin	Dexter Bean	Canada, United States	Brothers-in-law; Bean married Gosselin's sister Misty.
Marcus Grönholm	Timo Rautiainen	Finland	Brothers-in-law; Rautiainen married Grönholm's sister. Rautiainen was also a co-driver for Grönholm.
Kevin Harvick	John Linville	United States	Father-in-law; Harvick married Linville's daughter DeLana.
Ryan Hunter-Reay	Robby Gordon	United States	Brothers-in-law; Hunter-Reay is married to Gordon's sister Beccy.
Steve Krisiloff	Elmer George	United States	Father-in-law; Krisiloff married George's daughter Josie. (Divorced in 1993)
Steve Krisiloff	Tony George	United States	Brothers-in-law; Krisiloff married George's sister Josie. (Divorced in 1993)
Kyle Larson	Brad Sweet	United States	Brothers-in-law; Larson married Sweet's sister Katelyn. They co-promote the High Limit Sprint Car Series and racing events at Silver Dollar Speedway in Chico, California.
Vitantonio Liuzzi	Andrea Caldarelli	Italy	Brothers-in-law; Liuzzi married Caldarelli's sister, Francesca
Max Papis	Emerson Fittipaldi	Italy, Brazil	Father-in-law; Papis married Fittipaldi's daughter, Tatiana.
Jochen Rindt	Curt Lincoln	Austria, Finland	Father-in-law; Rindt married Lincoln's daughter Nina.
Gordon Shedden	Rory Butcher	United Kingdom	Brothers-in-law; Shedden married Butcher's sister Jillian.
Jim Trueman	Tim Cindric	United States	Father-in-law; Cindric married Trueman's daughter Megan.
