= International Speedway Corporation =

Defunct motorsport venue owner and operator

- Formerly: Bill France Racing, Inc.
- Type: Public
- Traded as: Nasdaq: ISCA
- Industry: Motorsports
- Founded: 1953; 73 years ago
- Founder: Bill France Sr.
- Defunct: October 18, 2019
- Fate: Acquired by NASCAR
- Headquarters: Daytona Beach, Florida, United States
- Key people: Jim France (chairman); Lesa Kennedy (vice chairman and CEO); Steve Phelps (president)
- Revenue: ▼$633.91 million USD (2010, November)
- Operating income: ▼$115.64 million USD (2010, November)
- Net income: ▼$54.53 million USD (2010, November)
- Website: www.internationalspeedwaycorporation.com

International Speedway Corporation (ISC) was a corporation whose primary business was the ownership and management of motorsports race tracks. ISC was founded by NASCAR founder Bill France Sr. in 1953 for the construction of Daytona International Speedway and in 1999 it merged with Penske Motorsports to become one of the largest motorsports companies in North America. The company played an important, though controversial, role in the modernization of the sport. It worked with NASCAR to create new tracks and update older ones in an effort to improve the racing and the experience for spectators and has constructed popular new tracks in regions previously thought uninterested in NASCAR. Because both companies have several members of the France family in top positions, ISC's competitors have filed multiple lawsuits on antitrust grounds.

On May 20, 2019, NASCAR agreed to purchase ISC for approximately US$2 billion, with it the purchase closing October 18, 2019. It has been dissolved into NASCAR.

== History ==
=== Bill France Racing ===
International Speedway Corporation (ISC) was founded as Bill France Racing, Inc. (later Daytona International Speedway Corporation) in 1953 and in 1957 the company signed a contract for the use of land on which to build Daytona International Speedway, one of the world's first superspeedways. A decade later, France decided to build another superspeedway, this time on a 2,000-acre (8.1 km^{2}) site near Talladega, Alabama and after its completion Talladega Superspeedway became NASCAR's fastest track. These two tracks were the fastest on the series schedule until the advent of restrictor plates in 1988. In 1968, the company assumed its later name to reflect its more ambitious scope. Two years later, ISC created the Motor Racing Network, a play-by-play radio network for NASCAR races, with MRN's first race coverage coming at the 1970 Daytona 500.

=== Transition ===
The early 1980s saw NASCAR's popularity increase, not only among fans, but also with sponsors. Companies like Ford, General Motors, Winston and Gatorade were willing to put up advertising dollars and holding auto races became a much more profitable venture. To capitalize on this, the company began pursuing expansion through the purchase of existing tracks. In 1982, the company bought one of the series' most popular and traditional ones, Darlington Raceway which has been in operation since 1950, as well as Tucson Raceway Park, a .375 miles (0.604 km) dirt oval (since paved) in Arizona. The following year they partnered with Corning Glass Works to purchase the Watkins Glen International road course in upstate New York. In 1987, Bill France Sr. stepped down as president of the company with Jim France replacing him. Two years later, ISC incorporated its food service company, Americrown.

=== Penske merger ===
By this time ISC was profitable, but most of their races were still in the South and in mostly rural areas, with many of the country's major cities like Los Angeles, Detroit, Miami and Chicago lacking a nearby track. ISC began looking for ways to change this in the late 1990s. Homestead–Miami Speedway was built in 1995 by Ralph Sanchez and Wayne Huizenga and in 1997 ISC and Penske Motorsports (owned by motorsports magnate Roger Penske) partnered with the track's owners. In 1999, the company continued its push into the country's urban centers when it merged with Penske, who at the time owned four speedways: Nazareth Speedway, North Carolina Speedway in Rockingham, North Carolina, Michigan International Speedway and the newly constructed Auto Club Speedway (which opened as California Speedway). Chairman Bill France Jr. cited the company's "attractive markets" as one of the major reasons for going ahead with the deal. The new company retained the ISC name, with Penske's son Gregory Penske joining the board of directors. Not all of the new tracks from the Penske merger fit into the company's plans however, as Nazareth was soon closed down and Rockingham was sold. The merger also gave ISC a 90% stake in Homestead-Miami Speedway and the company soon bought out the final 10% to acquire complete control over the track.

In the same year, ISC formed the Motorsports Alliance with the owners of the historic Indianapolis Motor Speedway; this company would go after another huge market in Chicago by building the new Chicagoland Speedway in nearby Joliet, Illinois and by buying out the smaller Route 66 Raceway dragstrip. In 2007, ISC bought out its partners in the company to take control of both tracks.

In 2001, ISC would continue its trend towards modern facilities by constructing Kansas Speedway near Kansas City. In 2003, Lesa France Kennedy took over from Jim France the role of president of the company. On June 1, 2009, John R. Saunders took over as President of ISC, becoming the first ISC president without a "France" surname. Saunders held the position of executive vice president of operations prior to becoming president.

On January 28, 2019, it was revealed on ISC's 2018 annual report that a total of 78,000 seats were removed from Chicagoland, Darlington, Kansas, Martinsville, Michigan, Phoenix, and Richmond.

=== Final years and acquisition by NASCAR ===
When it merged with NASCAR, the company owned 13 active tracks which collectively held 18 of the 36 events on the schedule of the NASCAR Cup Series. In addition to the stock car racing that NASCAR is famous for, ISC tracks also hosted IndyCar Series races, USCC, Grand-Am, IMSA GT and SCCA sports car races, WKA go-kart races and AMA motorcycle races. Besides NASCAR, other stock car series like IROC and ARCA used their tracks.

The company's other holdings included the Motor Racing Network, a radio network that broadcasts NASCAR events, and Americrown, a food service business that operates concession stands at its tracks. In 2005, ISC partnered with Speedway Motorsports, Inc. to form Motorsports Authentics, a company that markets and distributes NASCAR-related souvenirs and collectibles.

Prior to 2019, ISC was a separate company from NASCAR, but was also controlled by the France family. About 35% of the stock in ISC was owned by the heirs of NASCAR founder Bill France and the remainder traded on the stock market. Lesa France Kennedy is CEO and Jim France is Chairman. On May 20, 2019, it was announced that NASCAR would fully acquire ISC and take it private. The sale was completed on October 21, 2019.

== Former tracks ==
Track name	Location	Length	Seating	Year opened	Year acquired^{[A]}	Year sold	Current owner
Auto Club Speedway	Fontana, California	2.0 miles (3.2 km)	68,000	1997	1999	2019	NASCAR
Chicagoland Speedway	Joliet, Illinois	1.5 miles (2.4 km)	47,000	2001	2007	2019	NASCAR
Darlington Raceway	Darlington, South Carolina	1.366 miles (2.198 km)	47,000	1950	1982	2019	NASCAR
Daytona International Speedway	Daytona Beach, Florida	2.5 miles (4.0 km)	101,000	1959	1959 ^{†}	2019	NASCAR
Homestead–Miami Speedway	Homestead, Florida	1.5 miles (2.4 km)	46,000	1995	1999 ^{†}	2019	NASCAR
Kansas Speedway	Kansas City, Kansas	1.5 miles (2.4 km)	48,000	2001	2001	2019	NASCAR
Martinsville Speedway	Ridgeway, Virginia	.526 miles (0.847 km)	44,000	1947	2004	2019	NASCAR
Michigan International Speedway	Brooklyn, Michigan	2.0 miles (3.2 km)	56,000	1968	1999	2019	NASCAR
Nazareth Speedway	Nazareth, Pennsylvania	0.946 miles (1.522 km)	37,424	1966	1999	2004^{[B]}	Raceway Properties LLC.
Phoenix Raceway	Avondale, Arizona	1.0 mile (1.6 km)	42,000	1964	1997	2019	NASCAR
Pikes Peak International Raceway	Fountain, Colorado	1 mile (1.6 km)	62,000	1997	2005	2005^{[D]}	PPIR LLC.
Richmond Raceway	Richmond, Virginia	.75 miles (1.21 km)	51,000	1946	1999	2019	NASCAR
Rockingham Speedway	Rockingham, North Carolina	1.017 miles (1.637 km)	60,122	1965	1999	2004^{[C]}	Rockingham Properties LLC.
Route 66 Raceway	Joliet, Illinois	.25 miles (0.40 km) dragstrip	30,000	1998	2007	2019	NASCAR
Talladega Superspeedway	Talladega, Alabama	2.66 miles (4.28 km)	78,000	1969	1969	2019	NASCAR
Tucson Speedway	Tucson, Arizona	.375 miles (0.604 km)	N/A	1968	1982	2002^{[E]}	John Lashley
Watkins Glen International	Watkins Glen, New York	2.45 miles (3.94 km) road course	38,900	1948	1997	2019	NASCAR
^{†} - Daytona International Speedway and Homestead-Miami Speedway were managed by ISC subject to long-term leases with the cities where the tracks are located. The date listed is the year when ISC executed the leases, or acquired the leasehold, on these tracks.

- ^{A} Lists the year the company gained a controlling interest (>50%) in the track.
- ^{B} Nazareth was sold in 2015, the sale was conditional on racing not returning. It has been partially demolished.
- ^{C} ISC sold North Carolina Speedway to Speedway Motorsports as part of a settlement in the Ferko lawsuit, who subsequently auctioned the track to former racer Andy Hillenburg. The track was later purchased by another group of investors in 2018.
- ^{D} ISC shut down Pikes Peak International Raceway shortly after purchasing it, with NASCAR moving the track's Busch Series date to Martinsville. In 2008, the track was sold to a private company, Pikes Peak International Raceway, LLC.
- ^{E} ISC sold Tucson Raceway Park to David Deery, the track's general manager, in 2002.

== Past expansion plans ==
ISC and NASCAR made public their desire to have a presence in areas it sees as having the potential for growth, most notably the Pacific Northwest and New York City.

=== Pacific Northwest ===
==== Marysville ====
Kitsap County lies across Puget Sound from Seattle

In 2003, ISC began scouting sites in Washington and Oregon for a new track to attract fans from around the Pacific Northwest, eventually settling on a site near Marysville, Washington in Snohomish County, Washington north of Seattle. Although the plan was met with some resistance from residents – particularly those living near the site for the planned speedway – local business owners and other residents were in favor of the plan, believing that the track would be good for the area's economy and would create jobs. Unlike ISC's later proposal in New York, the Marysville proposal would be supported by public funds raised through taxes, in much the same way as other sports venues in the area (KeyArena, Safeco Field, CenturyLink Field). The track would have been publicly owned and leased to ISC. In November 2004, local officials and ISC announced that they could not go through with the deal, saying that the costs for that particular site would be too high.

==== Bremerton, Washington ====
After the deal in Marysville fell through, ISC courted another site, this time south of Bremerton National Airport in Bremerton, Washington just across Puget Sound from Seattle. Although like the Marysville proposal the proposal in Bremerton was to be partially funded with public money, the money will not come directly from taxes but instead from bonds funded by taxes, in a scheme similar to the one used to fund Kansas Speedway. Also like the Marysville proposal, the Bremerton track would be publicly owned and leased to ISC for three races per year. ISC's current proposal was met with a lukewarm response from area lawmakers and citizens, but the company has promised to present an improved offer for early 2007.

In March 2007, Washington state representative Larry Seaquist caused a minor controversy when he was quoted as saying, "These people are not the kind of people you would want living next door to you. They'd be the ones with the junky cars in the front yard and would try to slip around the law." The quote was assumed to be an attack on NASCAR fans but Seaquist later claimed that it was directed at ISC.

In April 2007, this plan was also abandoned by ISC after failing to get their bill out of committee in the Washington State Legislature or to gain the full support of the Kitsap County Commissioners.

=== New York City ===
On November 30, 2004, the company made no secret of its interest in building a superspeedway in the New York market and was in talks with Staten Island officials about the logistics of constructing a track there. In 2004, ISC purchased 600 acres (2.4 km^{2}) on Staten Island in New York City for the construction of a 4/5 mile (1.3 km) short track that would hold 80,000 fans and have the New York City skyline as its backdrop. The proposal was met with fierce resistance from many of the island's residents. At a public meeting in April 2006, police had to end the meeting early for fears of rioting and safety concerns. One report had a local councilman being put in a headlock after one particularly provoking speech (though one ISC official called it merely a "hug for the TV cameras"). In December 2006, ISC dropped their pursuit of the project.

=== Colorado ===
On February 13, 2007, the company announced that they were looking into building a track in Colorado. The 75,000-seat track would be built on one of two locations in Adams County, just east of Denver. The company would also be looking to use the same type of combination of public and private funds for the race track as in Kansas and Washington.

== Antitrust lawsuits ==
=== Ferko lawsuit ===
Francis Ferko, a stockholder in Speedway Motorsports, Inc., sued NASCAR and ISC in 2002 for violating federal antitrust laws and breach of contract for not awarding a second Winston Cup Series date to Texas Motor Speedway, claiming that the second race was "promised" to the SMI track by NASCAR. After an attempt by NASCAR to get the case dismissed, another shareholder, Rusty Vaughn, joined the case as co-plaintiff in 2003. Although NASCAR CEO Brian France initially said he was going to fight the case in the courts, in April 2004 it was announced that the case had been settled out of court with Texas getting the Cup date previously belonging to North Carolina Speedway and, as part of the deal, agreeing to purchase North Carolina—which now had no dates at all—from ISC for $100 million. Other races on the schedule were also moved around as a result (see NASCAR Realignment).

=== Kentucky Speedway lawsuit ===
In 2005, Kentucky Speedway filed a similar lawsuit against ISC and NASCAR, claiming that NASCAR violated antitrust laws by not awarding them a Sprint Cup Series race, noting the close relationship between NASCAR, ISC, and the France Family. NASCAR sought to have the case thrown out by arguing that the speedway wasn't trying to end the alleged anticompetitive practices, they were merely trying to benefit from them as well. This motion was denied, however. A motion to move the case from Kentucky to Florida – home of NASCAR and ISC – was also rejected. ISC, for its part, said it shouldn't be involved in the case at all as it conducts no business in the state. Lawyers for Kentucky Speedway contended that the company does business online and is just as responsible for the lack of competition in granting the races as NASCAR is.

Initially, Kentucky had wanted the jury to force NASCAR to grant the speedway a Sprint Cup Series event but in 2007 they changed their demand to instead force the France family to sell either NASCAR or ISC. The track is also demanding that NASCAR develop objective standards for the awarding of their race events and damages of $200 million. In January 2008, the court dismissed the lawsuit, saying that the plaintiffs had failed to make their case. Kentucky Speedway says they will appeal the court's decision.

In 2011, Kentucky Speedway, now owned by SMI, received a date, the Quaker State 400, on the Cup Series schedule, which lasted until 2020.
