= France family =

U.S. motorsports family

The France family are an American family best known for their ownership of the National Association for Stock Car Auto Racing (NASCAR). NASCAR was founded by Bill France Sr. in 1948 and to this day France family members own and operate NASCAR. Jim France, one of the sons of the founder, is the current chairman after Brian France's arrest on August 6, 2018 and subsequent leave from the position. The France family also controls International Speedway Corporation and IMSA.

== Notable family members ==
- Bill France Sr. (1909–1992) – co-founder, CEO and chairman of NASCAR
- Bill France Jr. (1933–2007) – CEO of NASCAR; chairman of ISC
- Jim France (1944–) – Chairman of NASCAR and IMSA, executive vice president of NASCAR
- Lesa France Kennedy (1961–) – executive vice president of NASCAR
- Brian France (1962–) – former CEO and chairman of NASCAR
- Ben Kennedy (1991–) – COO of NASCAR
