= Tim Mayer =

Motorsports organizer and official

Timothy A. Mayer II
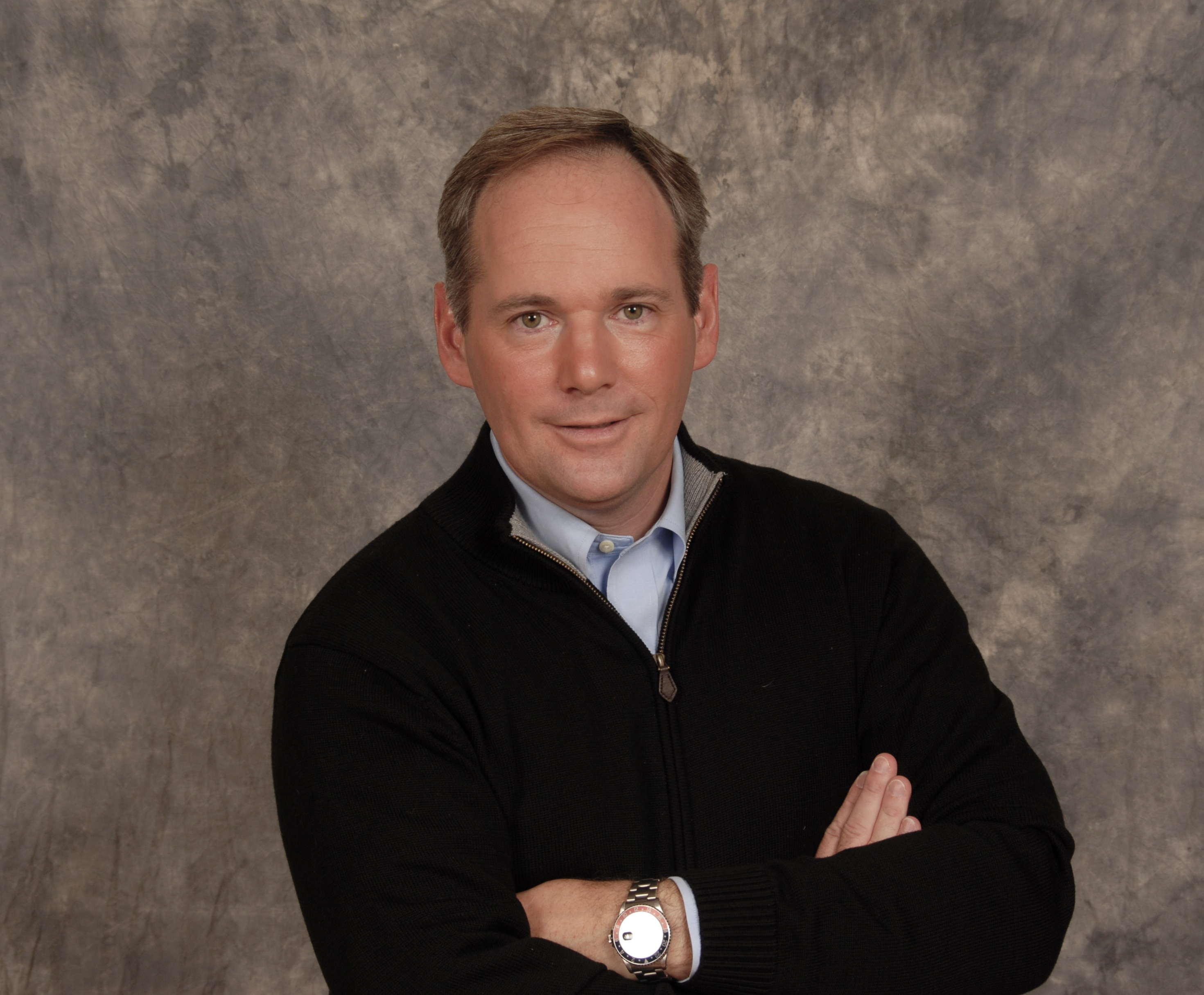
- Mayer in 2011
- Born: February 19, 1966 (age 60)
- Occupation: motorsports organizer
- Years active: since 1998

Timothy A. Mayer II (born February 19, 1966) is a motorsports organizer and official, having been SVP then EVP of Champ Car, COO of the International Motor Sports Association and the American Le Mans Series, and a steward for the FIA's World Championships, including Formula One, World Endurance Championship, World RallyCross Championship and World Rally Championship.

== Early life ==
The son of American motor racing identity Teddy Mayer and Sarah Mayer (née Bryant, now Dean), Mayer was named after his uncle, racing driver Timmy Mayer. Mayer was educated at Wellington College in the UK and Lehigh University in Pennsylvania (BS Management). Mayer enlisted in the US Army from 1986 to 1990, receiving a commission in the Infantry in 1991, before transferring to the US Army Reserve (Civil Affairs).

== Motorsport career ==
=== 1990s ===
Mayer worked with World Formula One Champion Emerson Fittipaldi from 1992-1994, and in 1994 established G3 Communications. Between 1994 and 1998, he served as executive producer for all Brazilian telecasts of IndyCar, Indy 500 and CART (IndyCar) races. He helped to found, build and operate the Rio de Janeiro Grand Prix (Rio 400). He provided logistics for the Australian Grand Prix and also produced many other international telecasts.

In 1998, Mayer went to work for CART as senior vice president of racing operations. He subsequently held positions as senior vice president of promoter relations, and Executive Vice President and special assistant to the chairman. He operated CART's worldwide operations, logistics and television, running races across the US, Canada, Mexico, Japan, Australia, the UK and Germany.

=== 2000s ===
In 2003, Mayer left CART to work directly on UK and German races for CART.

In 2004, he was hired as the chief operating officer of International Motor Sports Association (IMSA). In 2006, he also added the title of Chief Operating Officer of the American Le Mans Series (ALMS) and in 2008 added the title of race director for ALMS.

Mayer left IMSA and the ALMS at the end of 2009, returning to consulting for a variety of companies, through his company G3 Communications. He was elected as an independent director of the Automobile Competition Committee for the United States (ACCUS) and was the alternate delegate to the FIA.

=== 2010s–present ===
Mayer was a FIA International Steward, officiating the World Endurance Championship, the World Touring Car Championship, the World GT1 Championship, and the FIA Formula One World Championship, as well as several junior formulas. Mayer was one of four FIA Chairmen of the Stewards for Formula One.

In 2012 he was also appointed as the general manager of the Grand Prix of Baltimore.

Since 2012 Mayer has been president of US Race Management, the subsidiary of the ACCUS responsible for the sporting organization of the FIA World Championship races in the United States, including the WEC, Formula E and all the Formula One races.

In November 2024, the FIA dismissed Mayer from his role as a Formula One steward. Mayer claimed that his firing was related to his role in the appeal of a fine given to the organizers of the 2024 United States Grand Prix, which had resulted in "hurt feelings" from FIA president Mohammed Ben Sulayem.

=== FIA presidential bid ===
In July 2025 Mayer announced his intention to run against Ben Sulayem at the upcoming December FIA presidential election. Mayer accused Ben Sulayem of centralising power, mismanaging the organisation, and not fulfilling his election promises. He described Ben Sulayem's presidency as "corrosive" and a "reign of terror".

In October 2025, Mayer abandoned his presidential bid.

== Personal life ==
Mayer lives in the Atlanta USA area, has two boys by his first wife and was married to Katie Kennedy Mayer in 2020.
