= Jim France =

American auto racing businessman (born 1944)

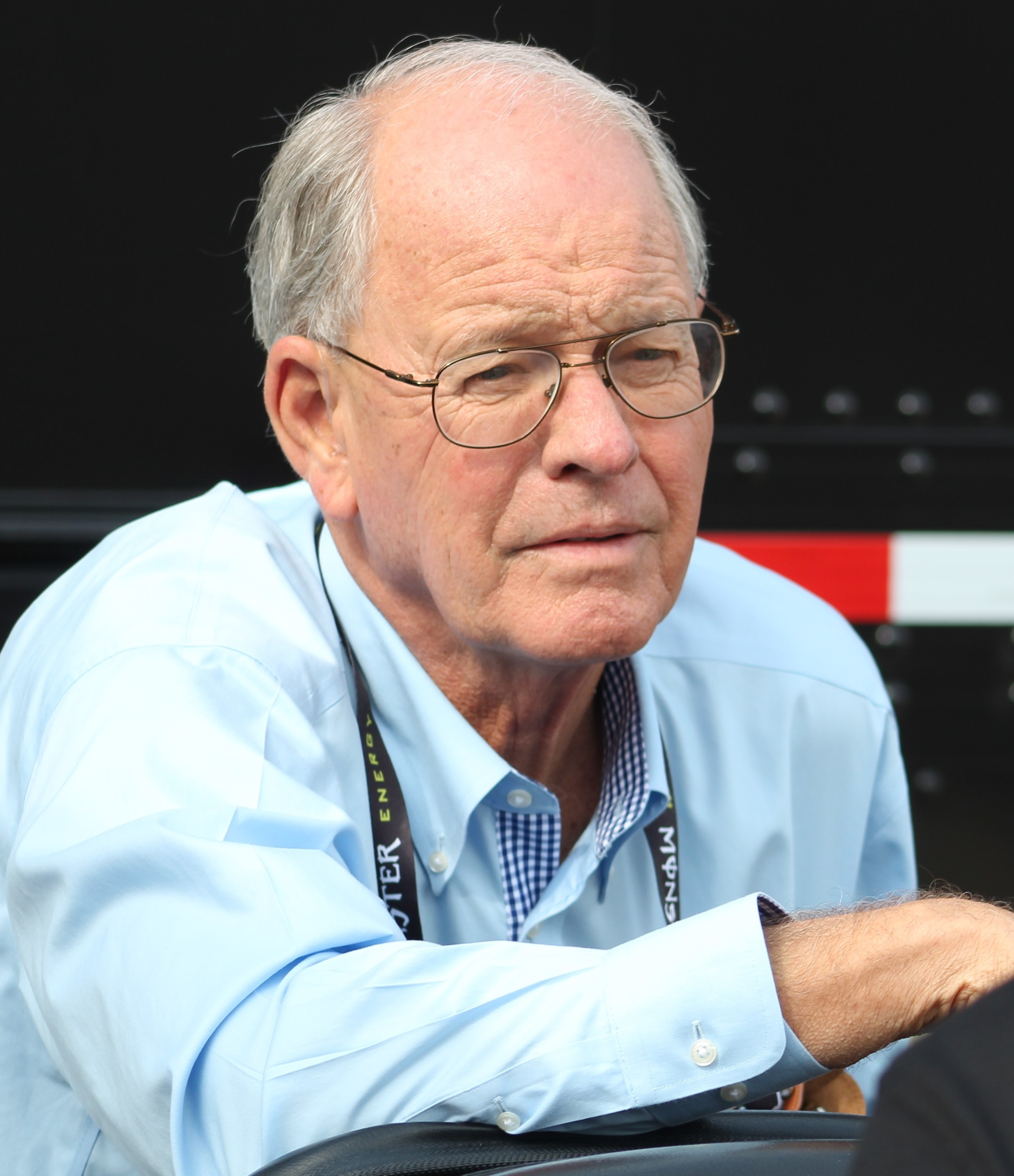
- France in 2019

CEO of NASCAR
- In office August 5, 2018 – April 24th, 2026
- Preceded by: Brian France
- Succeeded by: Steve O'Donnell
- In office Chairman of NASCAR
- Incumbent
- Assumed office August 5, 2018

Personal details
- Born: James Carl France; October 24, 1944 (age 82) Daytona Beach, Florida, U.S.
- Spouse: Sharon
- Children: 3
- Parent: Bill France Sr. (father)
- Relatives: Bill France Jr. (brother); Brian France (nephew); Lesa Kennedy (niece)
- Education: Florida Southern College
- Occupation: Vice chairman and executive vice president, NASCAR; Chief executive officer, International Speedway Corporation

James Carl France (born October 24, 1944) is an American motorsports executive. He is the former chief executive officer (CEO), the chairman, and executive vice president of NASCAR, the former chief executive officer (CEO) of International Speedway Corporation (ISC) and the owner of the IMSA team Action Express Racing. He is the son of NASCAR founder Bill France Sr.

== Early life ==
France was born and raised in Daytona Beach, Florida. He graduated from Seabreeze High School and attended Florida Southern College in Lakeland, Florida and earned a business degree in 1968.

== Career ==
=== NASCAR and ISC ===
The son of Anne Bledsoe and NASCAR co-founder Bill France Sr., France began working for his father at ISC in 1959, aged 14 years, and ultimately acceded to the ISC presidency in 1987. With his brother Bill France Jr., he inherited control of NASCAR and ISC upon his father's death in 1992, and, as a member, and for a time secretary, of the board of directors of NASCAR, he served influentially as an advisor to his brother through the latter's retirement as NASCAR president in 2000 and as NASCAR CEO and chairman of the board in 2004; France Jr., explained in 2000 that his singular prominence notwithstanding, the two jointly guided NASCAR and ISC, joking that, "In the past, we'd have a board meeting in the hall. My brother and I would meet and shoot the breeze for a few minutes". Upon the accession of Brian France to the chairmanship of NASCAR in 2003, Jim France served his nephew in a similar advisory role, most significantly after the 2007 death of France Jr.

On August 6, 2018, France assumed the role of Interim CEO and Chairman of NASCAR, following the arrest of his nephew and CEO Brian France; France was arrested on suspicion of DUI in Sag Harbor, New York on August 5, 2018. With Brian taking an official leave of absence from all NASCAR duties until his legal case is resolved, the interim part of Jim's title was dropped and he became CEO and Chairman of NASCAR.

On April 24, 2026, it was announced that France would be stepping down from his position as CEO, with Steve O'Donnell taking over the role of CEO.

=== Grand American Road Racing Association ===
In 1999, France founded the Grand-Am Road Racing, a sanctioning body for various forms of road racing in North America, finally the governing entity for five series, including the Rolex Sports Car Series, the successor to the United States Road Racing Championship and the sponsor of the 24 Hours of Daytona; the Michelin Pilot Challenge, a two-class touring car league; and the SunTrust Moto-ST Series, an endurance racing motorcycle series; the Association also operates the North American arm of the international Ferrari Challenge.

== Worth ==
As of January 2023, France was estimated to be worth $1.8 billion by Forbes.

== See also ==
- France family
