= Patricio Di Palma =

Argentine racing driver

Patricio Di Palma (born 26 June 1971 in Buenos Aires) is an Argentine racing driver. He has run in different series, with major success in Turismo Carretera and TC 2000. His brother José Luis Di Palma is also a driver.

== Career ==
- 1992: Argentine Supercart Championship
- 1993: Argentine Supercart Championship
- 1994: Argentine Supercart Championship
- 1995: Turismo Carretera
- 1996: Turismo Carretera
- 1997: Turismo Carretera
- 1998: Turismo Carretera
- 1999: Turismo Carretera
- 2000: Turismo Carretera
- 2001: Turismo Carretera
- 2002: Turismo Carretera, TRV6.
- 2003: Turismo Carretera
- 2004: Turismo Carretera, TC2000
- 2005: Turismo Carretera, Turismo Nacional champion.
- 2006: Turismo Carretera
- 2007: TC2000 (Volkswagen Bora), Turismo Carretera, TRV6.
- 2008: Turismo Carretera

Sporting positions
Preceded by None	Winner of the 200 km de Buenos Aires; 2004 (with Gabriel Ponce de León)	Succeeded by Diego Aventín; Luciano Burti
