= Teddy Mayer =

American businessman

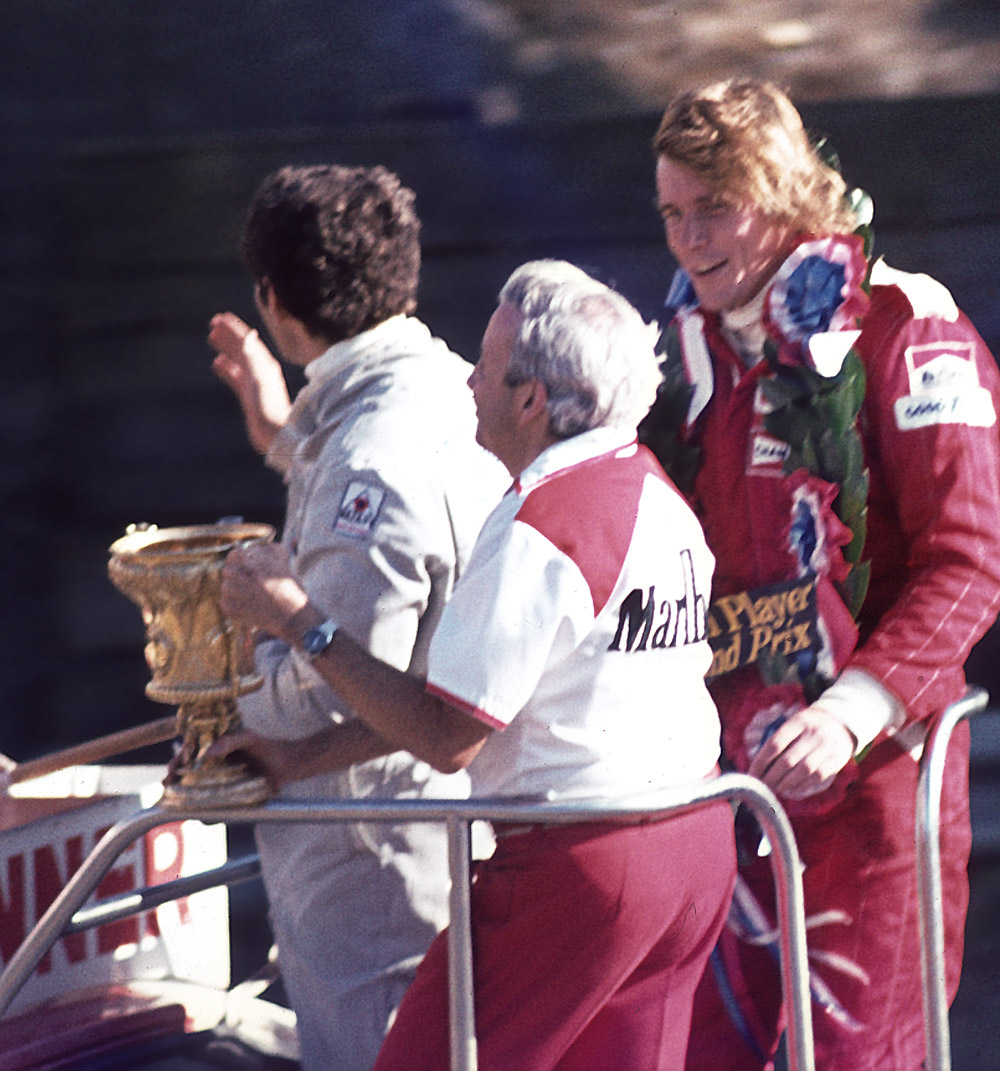
- Mayer (center, holding trophy) at the 1976 British Grand Prix
- Born: Edward Everett Mayer; September 8, 1935; Scranton, Pennsylvania, US
- Died: January 30, 2009 (aged 73); England
- Education: Cornell Law School
- Known for: McLaren Managing Director
- Predecessor: Bruce McLaren
- Successor: Ron Dennis
- Spouse: Sarah Bryant (divorced)
- Children: 2

Edward Everett Mayer (September 8, 1935 – January 30, 2009) was an American motor racing entrepreneur who was successful in several categories of racing, including Formula One and Indy cars.

== Life and career ==
Mayer was born in Scranton, Pennsylvania. While studying law at Cornell Law School, he became involved in the Rev-Em Formula Junior team whose drivers included his brother Timmy and Peter Revson. After graduating in 1962 Mayer followed his brother and Revson to Europe and joined Bruce McLaren who was setting up his Formula One team. Despite the death of his brother in 1964, Mayer continued to be involved in motor sport and assumed control of the McLaren team after Bruce McLaren died in 1970.

For much of the 1970s McLaren enjoyed considerable success, with both Emerson Fittipaldi and James Hunt taking the drivers title. In addition to Formula One, McLaren also competed in USAC, CART, and CanAm racing under Mayer's management. The McLaren team won the Indianapolis 500 twice; a McLaren chassis entered by Roger Penske also won the 500.

Towards the end of the decade the team's Formula 1 results began to decline and title sponsor Marlboro engineered a merger with the Project 4 team run by Ron Dennis. Mayer remained as joint managing-director until 1982, when he sold his shares and left the team he had helped to create.

Mayer continued to work in motor sport, firstly in Indy car racing, running the Texaco Star team under the Mayer Motor Racing banner, and then in 1986 returning to Formula One as manager of Haas Lola, a new team he co-founded with Carl Haas and running 1980 World Champion, Alan Jones alongside of former Ferrari and Renault driver Patrick Tambay. While the results were poor, the team showed great potential with the car generally regarded as one of the best in the F1 paddock but was let down by the under-powered Ford TEC turbo engine, until the acquisition of sponsor Beatrice forced the team's withdrawal.

Following a year's retirement, Mayer then returned to CART racing, joining the Penske team, as vice-chairman of Penske's motorsports operations, presiding over the team's success in the 1990s.

He moved to a consultancy role with Penske, which he continued until 2007.

Mayer lived in England. He and wife Sarah (Sally) Bryant (divorced in 1993) had two children, Tim Mayer (named after Teddy's brother), who is also in motorsports, and Anne. Both live in the United States.

Mayer died on January 30, 2009, of complications following his decade-long struggle with Parkinson's disease.
