= Beccy Gordon =

American racing driver

Beccy Gordon Hunter-Reay
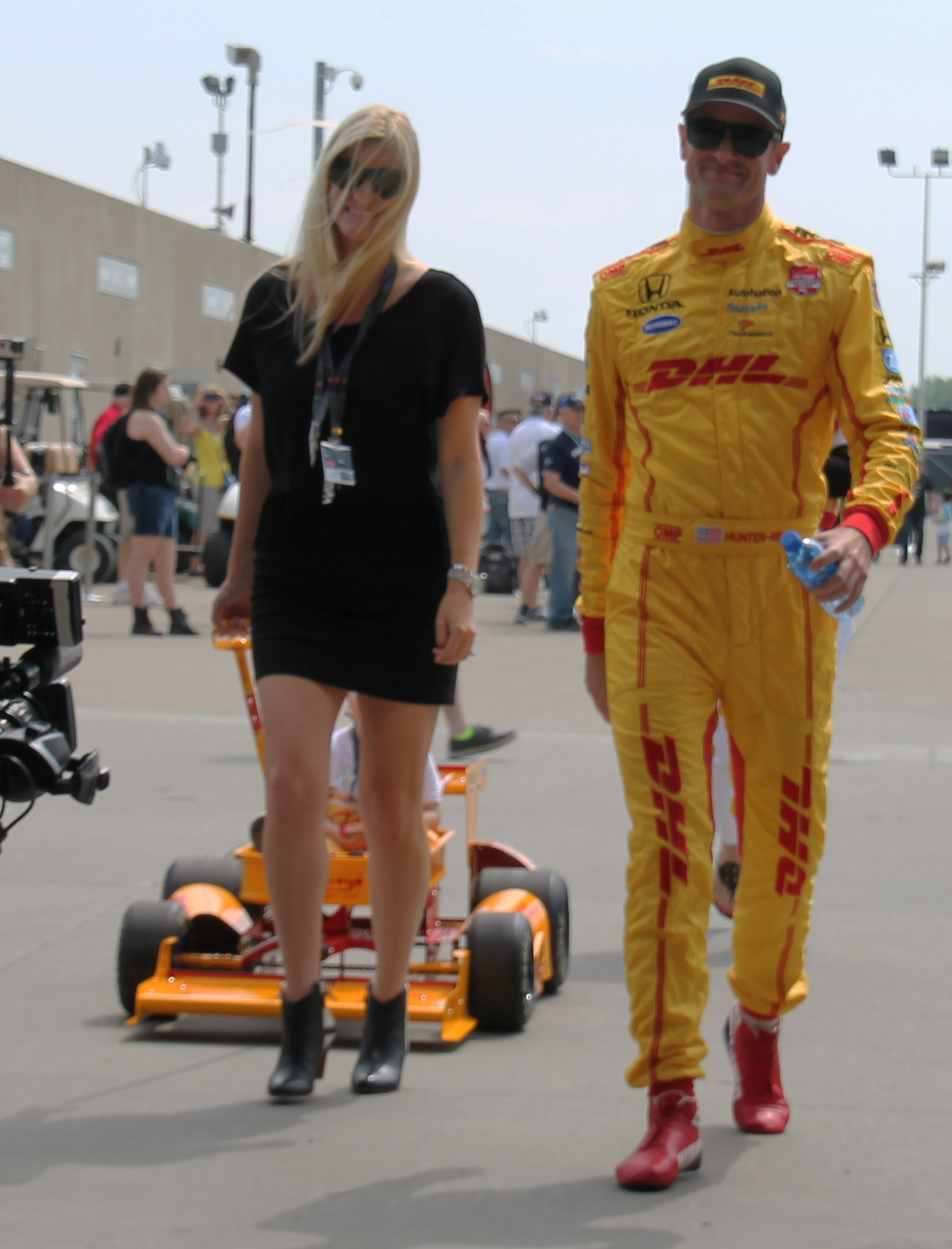
- Gordon (left) with her husband Ryan Hunter-Reay
- Nationality: American
- Born: Rebecca Jill Gordon; September 16, 1978 (age 48)
- Relatives: Huntley Gordon (great-grandfather); Bob Gordon (father); Robby Gordon (brother); Robyn Gordon (sister)

Previous series
- 2008: Toyota Pro/Celebrity Race

Rebecca Jill Gordon Hunter-Reay (born September 16, 1978) (née and professionally known as Beccy Gordon) is an American off-road racer, pit-reporter, and model.

== Softball and modeling career ==
Gordon was the youngest member, to date, on the United States women's national softball team.

Aside from softball, she was a swimsuit model for Roxy/Quiksilver for six years and represented such clients as Ralph Lauren, Victoria’s Secret and Speedo.

== Racing career ==
After obtaining a Bachelor of Arts degree in Communications from Chapman University, she decided to become a racing journalist. Gordon became a pit-reporter and feature host for the Champ Car World Series in 2004 and 2005. She is currently a spokesmodel for NASCAR and Phoenix International Raceway.

Beccy and her sister, Robyn Gordon, formed an all female off-road race team, All-American Girl Racing. In 2006, AAGR became the only all-girl team to complete the Baja 1000, and rounded out the season with two victories. They competed in Class 10 and Baja Challenge division. Gordon was selected by Toyota Motorsports to participate in the 2008 Toyota Pro/Celebrity Race at the Toyota Grand Prix of Long Beach as a "Pro" driver. This was Gordon's first race on pavement.

In 2012, Gordon made her first attempt at the Pikes Peak International Hill Climb, driving an electric Mitsubishi "i" car.

== Personal life ==
Beccy Gordon was born in the off-road racing Gordon family. Beccy’s great-grandfather, Huntley Gordon, raced Indy cars in the early 1900s and at the Indianapolis Motor Speedway, although official records do not list his name. Her father, “Baja Bob” Gordon entered the off-road racing scene in 1977. Gordon's mother, Marlene Gordon, pre-ran the Baja 500 when she was seven months pregnant with Beccy. Her sister Robyn Gordon, is listed as the only female to have ever won the Baja 1000 overall. Robby Gordon, her brother, has competed in numerous genres of racing, including the Indianapolis 500, Daytona 500, Baja 1000, and Paris to Dakar rally.

Gordon married IndyCar Series driver Ryan Hunter-Reay on July 3, 2011. Their first child, son Ryden, was born December 28, 2012. Their second child, son Rocsen, was born March 2015. Their third child, son Rhodes, was born September 14, 2016.
