= Huntley Gordon (racing driver) =

American racing driver (1883–1967)

- Born: Huntley Lennox Gordon; September 5, 1882 Minneapolis, Minnesota, U.S.
- Died: December 15, 1967 (aged 85) Orange, California, U.S.

Champ Car career
- 6 races run over 2 years
- First race: 1914 American Grand Prize (Santa Monica)
- Last race: 1915 Vanderbilt Cup (Panama–Pacific)
Wins	Podiums	Poles
0	0	0

Huntley Lennox Gordon (September 5, 1882 – December 15, 1967) was an American racing driver and cattle rancher.

== Biography ==
Gordon was born in Minneapolis and raised in California, the son of Hanford Lennox Gordon and Mary Louise Carpenter Gordon. His father was a Union Army veteran of the American Civil War and a real estate developer in Southern California.

Gordon was a dealer for the Stearns Motor Car Company. He made six American Championship Car Racing starts on the west coast in 1914 and 1915. His best finish was fifth place in the 1914 race on the road course in Corona, California. He drove a Mercer in all of his race starts. Later in life, he owned a horse and cattle ranch, and entered some of his horses in races.

Gordon married three times, and had three children. He died in 1967, at the age of 85, on his ranch near Chino. He was the grandfather of off-road racer "Baja" Bob Gordon and great-grandfather of CART and NASCAR racer Robby Gordon, and off-road racer Beccy Gordon.
