= All-American Girl Racing =

All-American Girl Racing is the only all female race team to compete in Southern Nevada Off-Road Enthusiasts (SNORE), Mojave Desert Racing (MDR), and SCORE International off-road racing events, including the treacherous Baja 500 and the infamous Baja 1000. The team is the only all girl team in off-road racing.

== Members ==
The team includes:

- Heather Bonnani, a long time off-road enthusiast who created the concept of the all-girl race team.
- Robyn Gordon and Beccy Gordon, daughters of racing legend "Baja Bob" Gordon and sisters of NASCAR driver Robby Gordon. They jumped at the opportunity to challenge the desert. Beccy is a motorsports TV host, while Robyn is the only female driver to have ever won the Baja 1000 overall. These ladies grew up in the desert watching their fathers, brothers, husbands and boyfriends race. They figured it was time for the men to help them get behind the wheel.

In 2006, All-American Girl Racing (AAGR) became the first all girl race team to ever complete the Baja 1000. They competed in the stock Baja Challenge division.
