= Timmy Mayer =

American racing driver (1938–1964)

Tim Mayer
- Born: February 22, 1938; Dalton, Pennsylvania, U.S.
- Died: February 28, 1964 (aged 26); Longford Circuit, Tasmania, Australia

Formula One World Championship career
- Nationality: (United States) American
- Active years: 1962
- Team: Cooper
- Entries: 1
- Championships: 0
- Wins: 0
- Podiums: 0
- Career points: 0
- Pole positions: 0
- Fastest laps: 0
- First entry: 1962 United States Grand Prix

Timothy Andrew Mayer (February 22, 1938 – February 28, 1964) was a racecar driver from Dalton, Pennsylvania in the United States. He participated in one World Championship Formula One Grand Prix, on October 7, 1962. He retired with ignition failure and scored no championship points.

== Career ==
Mayer's older brother Teddy was one of the founders of the McLaren team, with Bruce McLaren. Both brothers travelled from the United States to Europe in the early 1960s with future Grand Prix winner Peter Revson. The McLaren team's first championship series entries were for the 1964 Tasman Series, running Mayer and team-leader McLaren in custom-built Cooper T70 cars. However, Mayer was killed in practice for the final race of the series, at Longford, Tasmania, when he lost control at over 100 miles per hour (160 km/h) and spun and hit a tree next to the course. His car disintegrated, and wreckage narrowly missed young children who were spectators. Mayer died instantly from the impact. There was a memorial stone placed on the side of the road where Mayer had died, but it was moved, and is now to be seen, with his helmet, at the Country Club Hotel in Longford.

In his eulogy of team mate and friend Mayer, Bruce McLaren wrote in his 1964 book From the Cockpit: "The news that he had died instantly was a terrible shock to all of us, but who is to say that he had not seen more, done more and learned more in his few years than many people do in a lifetime? To do something well is so worthwhile that to die trying to do it better cannot be foolhardy. It would be a waste of life to do nothing with one's ability, for I feel that life is measured in achievement, not in years alone."

== Racing record ==
=== SCCA National Championship Runoffs ===
Year	Track	Car	Engine	Class	Finish	Start	Status
1962		Cooper		Formula Junior	1		

=== Complete Formula One World Championship results ===
(key)

Year	Entrant	Chassis	Engine	1	2	3	4	5	6	7	8	9	WDC	Points
1962	Cooper Car Company	Cooper T53	Climax Straight-4	NED	MON	BEL	FRA	GBR	GER	ITA	USA; Ret	RSA	NC	0

=== Complete British Saloon Car Championship results ===
(key) (Races in bold indicate pole position; races in italics indicate fastest lap.)

Year	Team	Car	Class	1	2	3	4	5	6	7	8	9	10	11	Pos.	Pts	Class
1963	Cooper Car Co.	Morris Mini Cooper S	A	SNE	OUL	GOO	AIN	SIL	CRY	SIL	BRH	BRH; 15	OUL; 13		21st	11	8th
1963	Cooper Car Co.	Austin Mini Cooper S	A											SNE; 8	21st	11	8th

=== Complete Tasman Series results ===
Year	Car	1	2	3	4	5	6	7	8	Rank	Points
1964	Cooper T70	LEV; 2	PUK; 3	WIG; 8	TER; 2	SAN; 4	WAR; 3	LAK; Ret	LON; DNS	4th	23
