= Bill France Sr. =

American racecar driver and NASCAR founder (1909–1992)

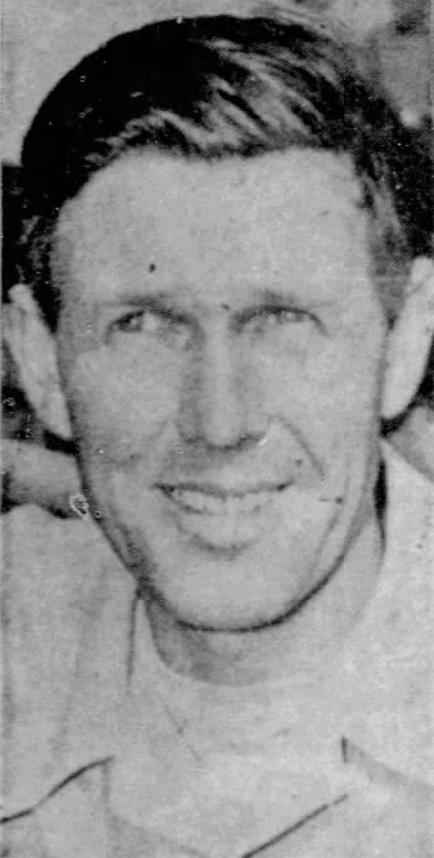
- France in 1949
- Born: William Henry Getty France; September 26, 1909; Washington, D.C., U.S.
- Died: June 7, 1992 (aged 82); Ormond Beach, Florida, U.S.
- Organization: NASCAR
- Title: Chief Executive Officer
- Successor: Bill France Jr.
- Spouse: Anne Bledsoe
- Children: Bill France Jr. Jim France
- Relatives: Brian France (grandson); Lesa Kennedy (granddaughter)

William Henry Getty France (September 26, 1909 – June 7, 1992) was an American businessman and racing driver. He was also known as Bill France Sr. or Big Bill. He is best known for founding and managing NASCAR, a sanctioning body of American-based stock car racing.

== Early life ==
France was born in Washington, D.C., the son of Emma Graham, an immigrant from Ireland, and William Henry France. His older brother James died at the age of 11. Big Bill skipped school as a teenager to make laps in the family Model T Ford at the high-banked 1.5-mile (2.4 km) board track near Laurel, Maryland. He ran laps until there was just enough time to beat his father home. France worked at several jobs before owning and operating his own service station. He built his customer base by waking before dawn and crank-starting customers' cars in the middle of winter.

France was familiar with Daytona Beach's land speed record history when he moved his family from Washington, D.C. to Daytona in the spring of 1935 to escape the Great Depression. He had less than $100 in his pocket when they left D.C. He began painting houses, then worked at a local car dealership. He set up a car repair shop in Daytona at 316 Main Street Station, still in existence today as an event and entertainment venue. Malcolm Campbell and other land speed record competitors decided to stop competing for land speed records at Daytona in favor of the Bonneville Salt Flats later in 1935 because the track was getting too rutted. Daytona had lost its claim to fame. City officials were determined to keep speed-related events, events which had been a mid-winter source of revenue for area hotels and restaurants.

== Early racing career ==
On March 8, 1936, the first stock car race was held on the Daytona Beach Road Course, promoted by local racer Sig Haugdahl. The race was 78 laps long (250 mi or 400 km) for street-legal family sedans sanctioned by the American Automobile Association (AAA) for cars built in 1935 and 1936. The city posted a $5000 purse with $1700 for the winner. The race was marred by controversial scoring and huge financial losses to the city. Ticket-takers arrived to find thousands of fans already at the beach track. The sandy turns at the ends of the track became virtually impassable with stuck and stalled cars. Second and third-place finishers protested the results. France finished fifth. The city lost $22,000.

Haugdahl talked with France, and together they got the Daytona Beach Elks Club to host another event on Labor Day weekend in September 1937. The event was more successful but still lost money despite its $100 purse. Haugdahl didn't promote any more events. France took over the job of running the course in 1938. There were two events in 1938. Danny Murphy beat France in the July event. France beat Lloyd Moody and Pig Ridings to win the Labor Day weekend event. Three races each were held in 1939 and 1940. France finished fourth in March, first in July, and sixth in September 1940. Four events were held in 1941.

France was busy planning the 1942 event until the Japanese bombed Pearl Harbor. France spent World War II working at the Daytona Boat Works while his wife Anne ran the filling station. Most racing stopped until after the war. Bill met Jim Johnstone Sr. in 1944 when Jim was stationed at Naval Air Station Daytona Beach, where Embry-Riddle Aeronautical University is currently located. Johnstone had been an auto mechanic in New Jersey, where his father built Indy car engines. He met France at Bill's filling station and became his race car mechanic. They traveled with their wives and children throughout Florida on the weekends, racing at many small tracks.

On April 6, 1946, Jim and Bill were testing Bill's car on the streets of Cocoa, Florida, when they were stopped for driving 74 mph (119 km/h) in the city limits. Jim was driving and had to pay a $25 fine. When the war ended, Jim moved his family back to New Jersey to start an auto parts business but remained close friends with Bill for the rest of his life. After the war, France decided to concentrate on promoting instead of driving. In sixteen events at Daytona Beach, France had two victories and six Top-5 finishes. France promoted events at Seminole Speedway immediately after the war. He built the Occoneechee Speedway in 1947.

== NASCAR ==
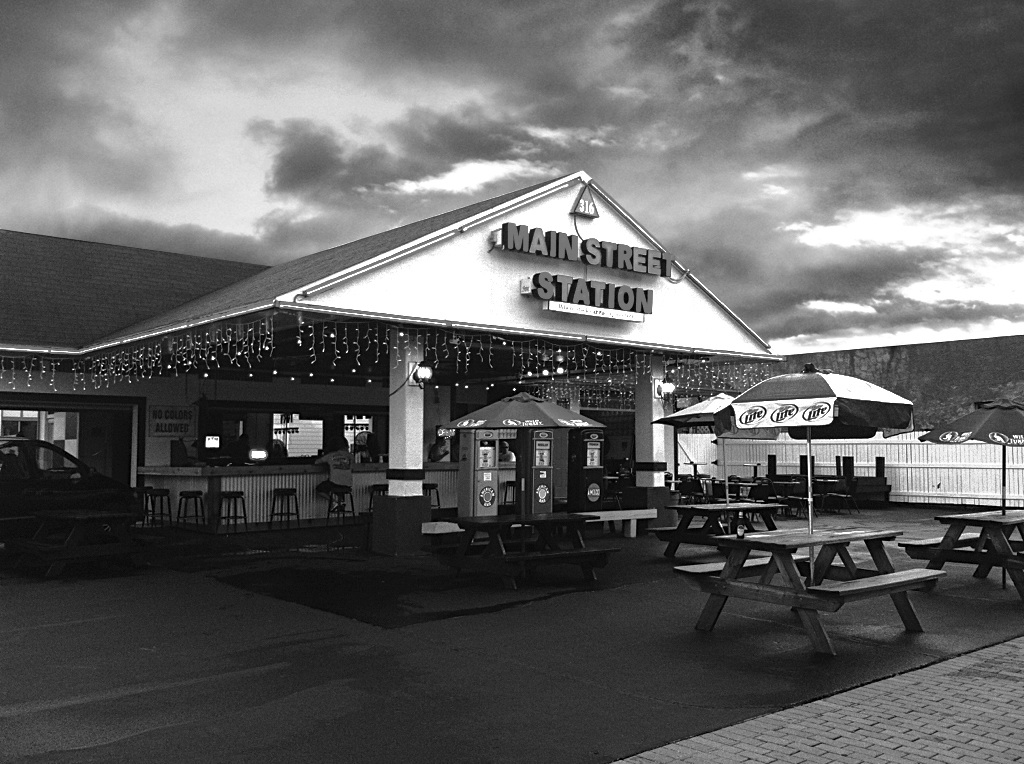
The property located at 316 Main Street Station once owned and operated by France, which is still operating today as an event and entertainment venue.

France knew that promoters needed to organize their efforts. Drivers were frequently victimized by unscrupulous promoters who would leave events with all the money before drivers were paid. On December 14, 1947, France began talks with drivers, mechanics, and car owners at the Ebony Bar at the Streamline Hotel at Daytona Beach, Florida, which ended with the formation of NASCAR on February 21, 1948. They discussed uniform rules, insurance coverage, and guaranteed purses.

By 1953, France knew it was time for a permanent track to hold the large crowds that were gathering for races at Daytona and elsewhere. Hotels were being constructed along the beachfront. On April 4, 1953, he proposed a new superspeedway called Daytona International Speedway. France began building a new 2.5 miles (4.0 km) superspeedway in 1956 to host what would become the new premier event of the series – the Daytona 500. The event debuted in 1959 and has been the premier event since.

France later built the Talladega Superspeedway that opened in 1969.

France was chairman and CEO of NASCAR. R. J. Reynolds Tobacco Company became the title sponsor in 1971, a move that changed the name of the series from "Grand National" to "Winston Cup". Reynolds convinced France to drop all dirt tracks and races under 100 miles (160 km) from the NASCAR schedule in 1972, a move that defined the "modern era" of the sport. Big Bill then turned the reins of NASCAR over to his son Bill France Jr. France kept an office at the headquarters until the late 1980s.

France built the International Motorsports Hall of Fame, which inducted France in its first class on July 25, 1990.

== Political activity ==
France also was campaign manager for George Wallace during the latter's 1972 effort to achieve the Democratic nomination for President of the United States and permitted Wallace to campaign during the Daytona 500 race held in that year. After Wallace ended his campaign, France became the vice chairman of John Connally's Democrats for Nixon that supported Richard Nixon's re-election; he was also a member of the Motorsports Committee for the Reelection of President Nixon alongside various drivers and racing executives.

== Death ==
France died June 7, 1992, at his home in Ormond Beach, Florida, after suffering from Alzheimer's disease, aged 82.

== Honors ==
- He was inducted into the International Motorsports Hall of Fame in 1990.
- He was inducted in the Motorsports Hall of Fame of America in 1990.
- He was inducted in the Automotive Hall of Fame in 2004.
- He became a member of the National Motor Sports Press Association (NMPA) Hall of Fame at Darlington, South Carolina.
- He was inducted into the Daytona Beach Stock Car Racing Hall of Fame in 1992.
- He was inducted into the NASCAR Hall of Fame on May 23, 2010.
- NASCAR named its Cup Series trophy the Bill France Cup in 2020.

Sporting positions
Preceded by Roy Hall	National Stock Car Champion (Unofficial); 1940	Succeeded by Roy Hall
