= Brian France =

American auto racing executive (born 1962)

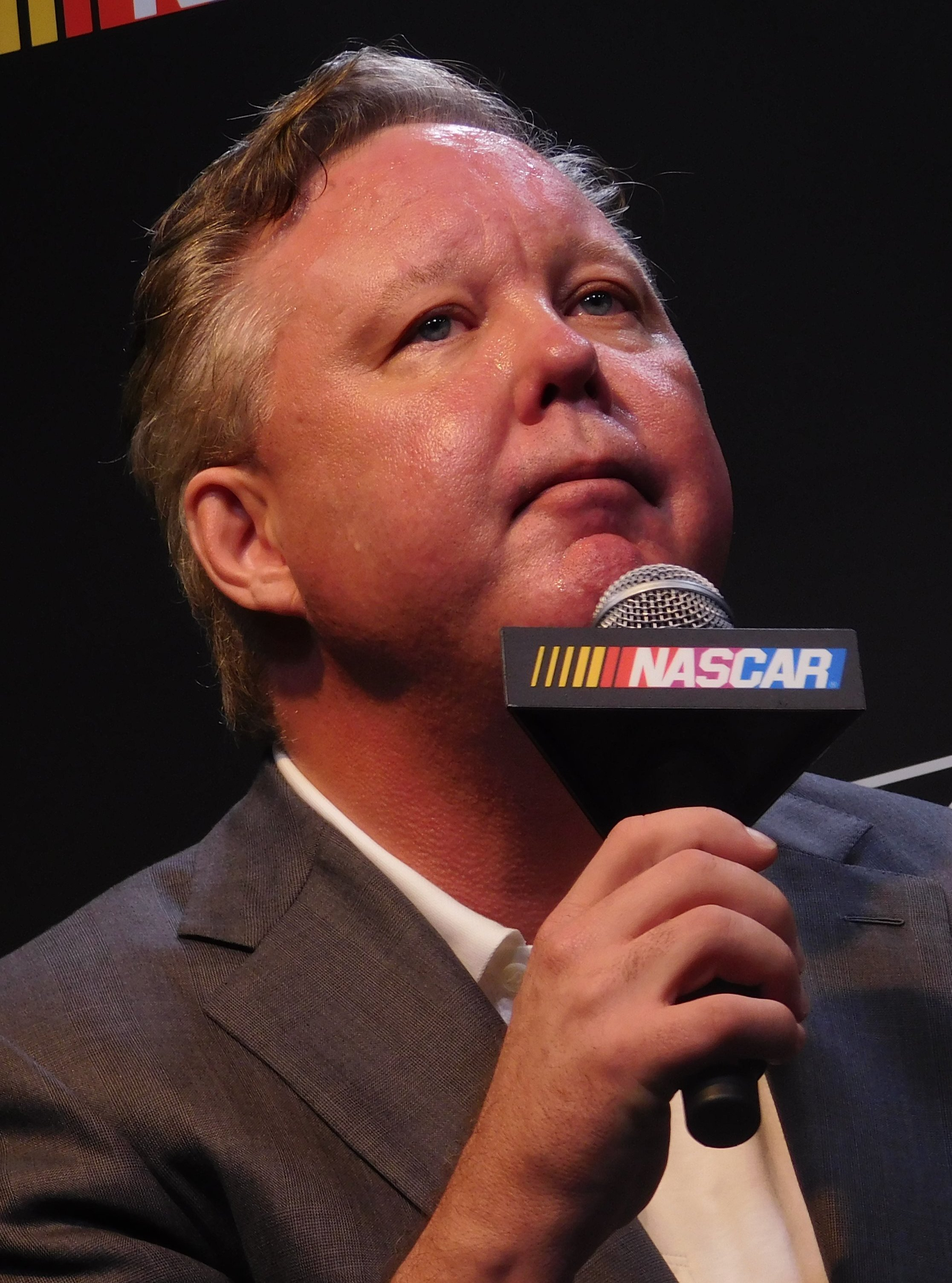
- France in 2016

CEO and chairman of NASCAR
- In office September 2003 – August 5, 2018
- Preceded by: Bill France Jr.
- Succeeded by: Jim France

Personal details
- Born: Brian Zachary France; August 2, 1962 (age 64) Daytona Beach, Florida, U.S.
- Spouse: Amy France
- Children: 4
- Parent: Bill France Jr. (father)
- Relatives: Bill France Sr. (grandfather); Jim France (uncle); Lesa Kennedy (sister)
- Education: University of Central Florida

Brian Zachary France (born August 2, 1962) is an American businessman and the former CEO and chairman of NASCAR. He served in the post from 2003 to 2018, following his grandfather (and NASCAR co-founder) Bill France Sr. and father Bill Jr., in the executive position. In 2019, France founded Silver Falcon Capital, Inc. and became CEO of the private investing firm.

== Early life ==
France was exposed to the business of stock car racing from a young age. His first job in racing was as a janitor at the Talladega Superspeedway. France studied at the University of Central Florida but joined NASCAR before earning a degree.

== Early career ==
France managed several short tracks, including Tucson Raceway Park in Arizona in the earlier years of his career. In the 1990s, he ran NASCAR's Los Angeles office and helped create associations between NASCAR and the entertainment industry. As a result, films began advertising at NASCAR events, and NASCAR drivers began to feature in various forms of media. In 1995, France helped to create the Craftsman Truck Series. In 2000, he became NASCAR's executive vice president.

== Career ==
=== NASCAR CEO ===
France became NASCAR's CEO and chairman of the board in 2003, after his father retired from the position. One of France's first actions as CEO was to create a new safety rule that barred drivers from racing back to the start/finish line when under caution. After assuming control of NASCAR, France negotiated a title sponsorship from Sprint Nextel and introduced the Chase for the Sprint Cup over the transition period, receiving a $4.5 billion television contract for the initial ten race seasons, in addition to a later multibillion-dollar deal with NBC. France also made an effort to expand the audience base of NASCAR to minorities, and allowed Toyota vehicles to begin competing on the NASCAR circuit. During France's tenure as CEO, NASCAR's TV ratings peaked in the mid-2000s, but by 2014, they had dropped, accompanied by a 15% decrease in track attendance. Sporting News named France one of the five most powerful sports executives in 2005, and, in 2006, Time magazine named him one of the "100 Most Influential of the Century."

During the 2016 presidential campaign, NASCAR pulled its Xfinity Series and Camping World Truck Series award ceremonies from a Trump resort near Miami. Later, on February 29, 2016, France and several NASCAR drivers appeared at a rally to endorse Donald Trump's candidacy.

In August 2018, France took an "indefinite leave of absence" from his role as CEO and chairman of NASCAR. On August 5, France was pulled over in Sag Harbor, New York, for driving through a stop sign and subsequently arrested for DUI and possession of oxycodone. France later pleaded guilty to one count misdemeanor DUI on June 7, 2019. His leave of absence officially ended in February 2019 when interim head of NASCAR, Jim France, permanently took over as CEO and chairman.

France spoke publicly on his NASCAR tenure for the first time in a 2022 episode of The Dale Jr. Download. He described the arrest as a "dark moment" in his life, but appreciated that his departure allowed him to prioritize his personal health. He also ruled out a return to NASCAR because "once you've done what I've done, there's not really a good role for you."

=== Silver Falcon Capital ===
In 2019, France founded and became CEO of Silver Falcon Capital, Inc., a private investment firm based in Charlotte, North Carolina.

== Other ventures ==
France founded Brand Sense Partners, a Los Angeles-based licensing company. He and his wife are the founders of the Amy and Brian France Foundation, and the Luke and Meadow Foundation, a philanthropic cause that focuses on children.

== Style of management ==
Brian France implemented a wide variety of policies and mandates that tended to focus heavily on driver safety (largely in response to the death of Dale Earnhardt) and equal opportunity for virtually all drivers to contend. Some of the rules implemented included the mandate of the HANS device for all drivers, installation of SAFER barriers around the outside walls of each track (eventually, the inside walls of each track as well), as well as the 'yellow line rule' at superspeedways (which states that no driver may advance their position if they noticeably place at least their left side tires below the inside yellow line surrounding the track), and the 'overtime line' rule, which was a designated area of the track where if a caution were to be thrown at any time within the closing two laps and the leader had passed through the area, but had not yet crossed the official start/finish line, the race would end and a winner would be declared (this was removed after the 2017 NASCAR season). Many fans, especially those of a somewhat older age who had gotten used to Bill France Jr.'s style of management, were not in favor of these rule changes; this caused NASCAR's ratings to drop significantly throughout the early to mid-2010s.

== Litigation ==
In March 2020, Brian France sued John L. Steele, an internet user behind the parody Twitter account "Drunken Brian France" (@DrunkBrianF), for "infliction of emotional distress" and invasion of privacy. In April 2020, the lawsuit was withdrawn after Steele agreed to delete the account. The lawsuit has been cited as an example of an SLAPP lawsuit.
