= Bill France Jr. =

Former NASCAR president

- Born: William Clifton France; April 4, 1933; Washington, D.C., U.S.
- Died: June 4, 2007 (aged 74); Daytona Beach, Florida, U.S.
- Resting place: Volusia Memorial Park; Ormond Beach, Florida
- Education: University of Florida
- Known for: Served as Head of NASCAR from 1972 to 2000
- Spouse: Betty Jane
- Children: Brian France; Lesa Kennedy
- Parent(s): Bill France Sr. Anne Bledsoe
- Relatives: Jim France (brother)

William Clifton France (April 4, 1933 – June 4, 2007), better known as Bill France Jr. or Little Billy, was an American motorsports executive who served from 1972 to 2000 as the chief executive officer (CEO) of NASCAR, the sanctioning body of the American-based stock car racing. He succeeded his father, NASCAR founder Bill France Sr. as its CEO. His son, Brian France, was the CEO from 2003 to 2018.

== Early life ==
France was born in Washington, D.C., to Anne Bledsoe and William Henry Getty France. His family moved to Daytona Beach, Florida, in 1935 to escape the Great Depression. He attended Seabreeze High School before attending the University of Florida. He served for two years in the United States Navy before turning to a career in racing.

France grew up helping at race tracks; he sold concessions and helped park cars at the Daytona Beach Road Course. He worked twelve hours per day, seven days a week for thirteen months with the construction of Daytona International Speedway, where he drove a compactor, bulldozer, and grader. He once tried using a mule to pull trees out of the swamp because motorized equipment was getting stuck.

France rode off-road motorcycles, and began competing in enduros in the 1960s. He entered the Baja 1000 in the motorcycle division in the early 1970s. He gave the up-and-coming sport of motocross a chance at Daytona in the early 1970s. The motocross races started with little fanfare, but grew into the popular Daytona Supercross, part of Daytona Beach Bike Week, which began in the late 1930s.

== Career ==
After serving as vice-president for six years, he became the head of NASCAR when his father Bill France Sr. retired on January 10, 1972. The International Motorsports Hall of Fame describes the transition: "Other than the founding of NASCAR itself, Bill Jr.'s appointment to leadership is probably the most significant event in the history of the sanctioning body." NASCAR would transition from a Southern spectator sport to a nationally televised sport during his tenure.

France Jr. was instrumental in taking the sport outside of its traditional American base. In 1981, he struck a deal with multimillion-dollar Australian tire retailer and retired racer Bob Jane to take stock car racing to Australia and plans were laid out for a high-banked speedway at the Jane owned Calder Park Raceway in Melbourne. The 1.119 mi (1.801 km) Calder Park Thunderdome, the first high-banked NASCAR style speedway built outside of North America, was built at a cost of A$54 million and was opened in 1987. The new track, modelled on a scaled down version of the Charlotte Motor Speedway, including mimicking its 24° banked turns, held its first NASCAR race, the Goodyear NASCAR 500 (for 500 km) on February 28, 1988, and was won by Alabama Gang member Neil Bonnett driving a Pontiac Grand Prix. Although only an exhibition race, this was also the first NASCAR race held outside of North America. Jane became the head of the sanctioning body for stock car racing in Australia known as Australian Stock Car Auto Racing (AUSCAR), though a falling out between him and France in 1991 saw NASCAR withdraw its support for Jane and his track. NASCAR racing in Australia continued to be sanctioned by Jane until the series folded in 2001.

France continued his father's legacy by fostering growth of the Daytona 500 stock car race and Daytona 200 motorcycle race at Daytona International Speedway. The Winston Million program was launched by R.J. Reynolds in 1985. A $1 million bonus was awarded to any driver who could win three of four preselected races.

NASCAR's Grand National series was renamed Winston Cup in 1971. The points fund increased from $750,000 to $2 million. The champions portion of the points fund rose to $2 million by 1998.

NASCAR had few televised races in 1972. Those races that did air in the 1970s were mixed into shows like ABC Wide World of Sports. France signed a deal with CBS Sports' president Neal Pilson to televise the 1979 Daytona 500 from flag to flag. The race was the first live flag to flag national coverage of a NASCAR race. The race got high television ratings, partly due to a snowstorm in the Midwest and Northeast. Richard Petty won the race after race leaders Donnie Allison and Cale Yarborough crashed together on the final lap. Allison's brother Bobby Allison stopped, and Bobby Allison and Yarborough then exchanged punches. The ratings and ensuing press coverage helped France to sign television contracts with ESPN in 1980, TNN in 1990, and TBS. France's career culminated in a record-setting $2.4 billion television broadcasting contract in 1999 for the 2001 season.

France was a delegate from Florida to the 1972 Democratic National Convention and supported the candidacy of George Wallace, who had won the Florida Democratic presidential preference primary that year.

In 1993, France's employees told him about six-year-old Ohio leukemia patient Sarah Ashley Secoy. He called her father and pledged to make her struggle and international marrow donor search a global news story. His efforts made her a radio and TV news story. He also helped fund "Sarah's Song", a duet recorded with her father that France promoted to tens of thousands of radio stations globally. Millions were thus raised to pay for her six-year hospital fight inside a germ free chamber. Her genetic match donor was found. She became the first patient ever to survive acute myeloid leukemia thus leading to an all new global treatment concept for several deadly childhood cancers that has now saved thousands of children's lives.

== Later life ==
France turned the presidency of NASCAR over to Mike Helton in 2000 after being diagnosed with cancer. He made his son Brian France the CEO and chairman of NASCAR in 2003. Bill France Jr. remained a member of the six-person NASCAR board of directors.

France died of lung cancer in Daytona Beach, Florida, on June 4, 2007, at about 1:00 pm. His death occurred during the rain-delayed Autism Speaks 400 Cup race, and his death was reported during the live broadcast of the race at lap 261. NASCAR on Fox lead announcer Mike Joy held a moment of "silence" during a restart on lap 279, and the track's flag was lowered to half staff.

== Halls of fame inductions ==
- International Motorsports Hall of Fame in 2004.
- Motorcycle Hall of Fame in 2004.
- Motorsports Hall of Fame of America in 2004.
- Automotive Hall of Fame in 2006.
- NASCAR Hall of Fame in 2010.
