= Lesa France Kennedy =

American businesswoman (born 1961)

- Born: Lesa Dawn France; May 24, 1961 (age 65)
- Education: Duke University (BA)
- Occupation: Executive Vice Chair of NASCAR
- Spouses: Bruce Kennedy (m. 1988; died 2007) Bill Christy (m. 2019)
- Children: Ben Kennedy
- Relatives: Bill France Jr. (Father)

Lesa France Kennedy, (born Lesa Dawn France on May 24, 1961) is an American businesswoman and Executive Vice Chair of NASCAR.

== Education and career ==
Kennedy received a B.A. in Economics and a B.A. in Psychology from Duke University in 1983.

Kennedy joined ISC in 1983 and was named to the board of directors one year later. She served as ISC's secretary from 1987–96 and as its treasurer from 1989–96. From that point until April 2003, Kennedy was the company's executive vice president. She was then appointed president of ISC after her father, Bill France Jr. stepped down. Most recently, Kennedy was named chief executive officer in April 2009.

Kennedy has been ranked as one of the most influential women in sports by numerous publications. Forbes called her "The Most Powerful Woman in Sports" in 2009. In 2006, she was listed as one of the "25 Most Influential People in NASCAR" by The Charlotte Observer, "Most Influential Woman in Sports Business" by Volusia Flagler Business Report, and was "Female Sports Executive of the Year" according to SportsBusiness Journal. In 2016, Adweek named her one of the "30 Most Powerful Women in Sports". In 2022, she was named one of Sports Business Journal's "Most Influential Property Pacesetters."

== Personal life ==
Kennedy is married to Bill Christy, CEO of CLASH Endurance, an event endurance sports media company.

Kennedy's first husband, Dr. Bruce Kennedy, was killed in a plane in Sanford, Florida on July 10, 2007. Five people were killed, including two small children.

She is the mother of former NASCAR driver and current SVP of Racing Development & Strategy Ben Kennedy.

== See also ==
- France family
