= Hells Angels MC criminal allegations and incidents in New York =

Criminal incidents involving the Hells Angels in New York state

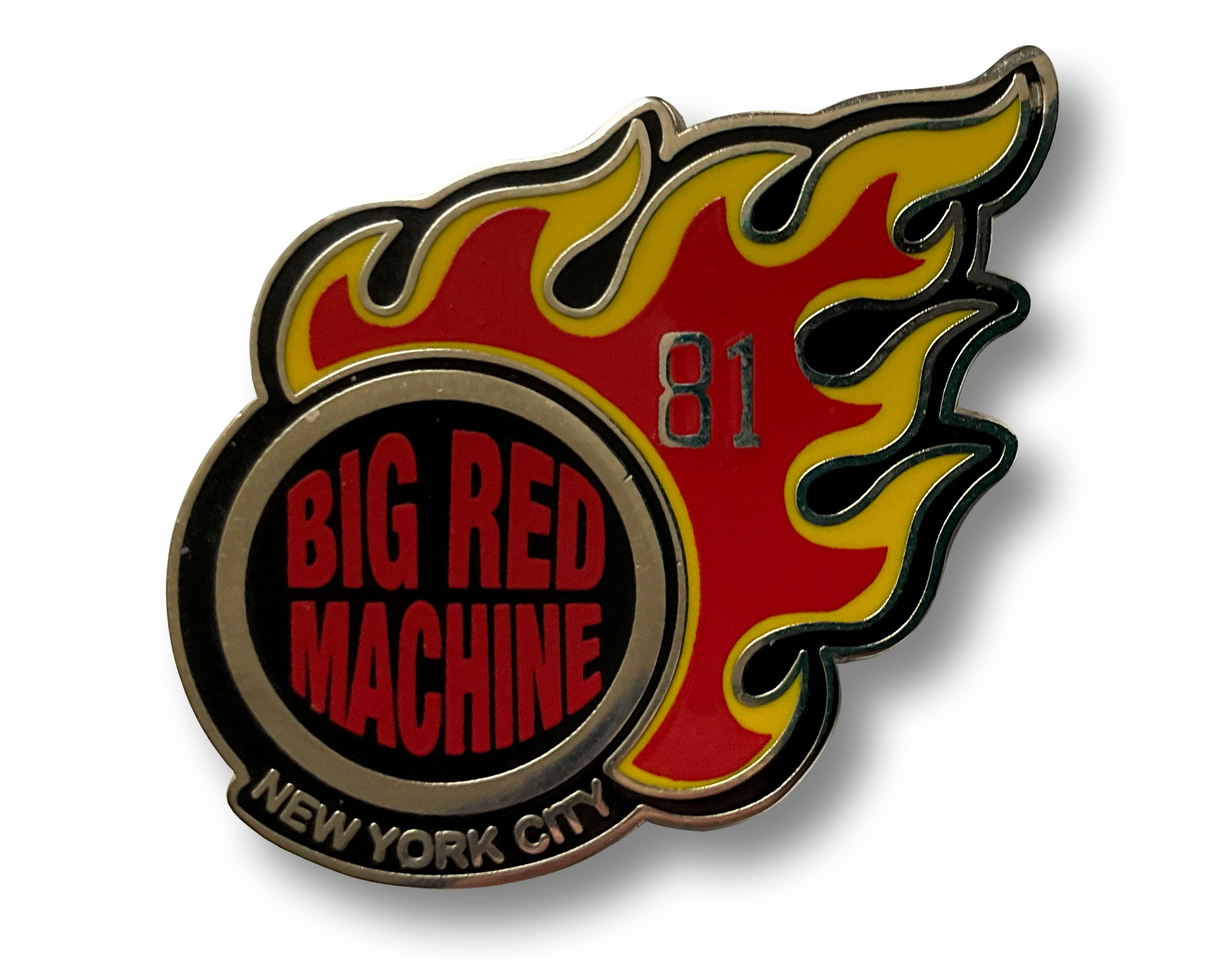
A supporter pin of the New York City Hells Angels charter with the paraphrases "81" and "Big Red Machine".

Numerous police and international intelligence agencies classify the Hells Angels Motorcycle Club (HAMC) as a motorcycle gang and contend that members carry out widespread violent crimes, including drug dealing, trafficking in stolen goods, gunrunning, extortion, and prostitution rings. Members of the organization have continuously asserted that they are only a group of motorcycle enthusiasts who have joined to ride motorcycles together, to organize social events such as group road trips, fundraisers, parties, and motorcycle rallies, and that any crimes are the responsibility of the individuals who carried them out and not the club as a whole.

The Hells Angels founded their first chapters in New York state on December 5, 1969 by "patching over" the Aliens motorcycle gang of New York City and the Hackers biker gang in Rochester. Two other chapters in Upstate New York were then established in Binghamton in 1975, and Troy on August 23, 1978. With additional chapters in New Rochelle and Suffolk County, the Hells Angels also have a presence in the Hudson Valley, and on Long Island, in the Greater New York area of Downstate New York. The New York City charter is among the club's largest, and, along with the Cleveland chapter in Ohio, is responsible for coordinating all Hells Angels activities in the Eastern United States as well as those of chapters in Canada and Europe.

The Hells Angels have formed links with the Gambino and Genovese crime families in New York City and the Bufalino crime family in Western New York, providing security, transportation in narcotics transactions and contract killings for the Mafia in exchange for drugs. The U.S. Customs Service documented cases in which the New York Hells Angels partnered the Medellín Cartel in the smuggling of cocaine. The club also distributes methamphetamine in the state and smuggles marijuana into the United States from Canada through the St. Regis Mohawk Reservation.

== Mafia connections ==
The United States Department of Justice has stated that the Hells Angels have links with New York's Gambino and Genovese crime families; the mafia is afforded security and transportation in narcotics deals in exchange for drugs and contract killings.

== Rape and sexual assault ==
Eight Hells Angels members, who were in New York City to attend the funeral of murdered club member Jeffrey "Groover" Coffey, were arrested on suspicion of the March 10, 1971 gang rape of a seventeen-year-old girl in a leather goods store in East Village, Manhattan. The bikers allegedly returned to the store, owned by Eugene Pritzert, to pick up goods they had ordered the day before. When Pritzert told them the goods were not ready, they began abusing him, waking Pritzert's girlfriend who was asleep in the rear of the store. While some members guarded the store owner, others took turns beating and raping the girl. After approximately six hours, Pritzert managed to escape and alerted police. The girl identified her alleged attackers in a police lineup. The eight men – Robert Cardner, Robert Marshall and Car Paretta from Massachusetts, Thomas Fusco, Edward Robinson and Kevin Seymour from New York state, Kurt Groudle from Ohio, and James Ordfield from New York City – were charged with rape, sodomy, unlawful imprisonment and criminal trespassing.

== Incidents at 77 East 3rd Street ==
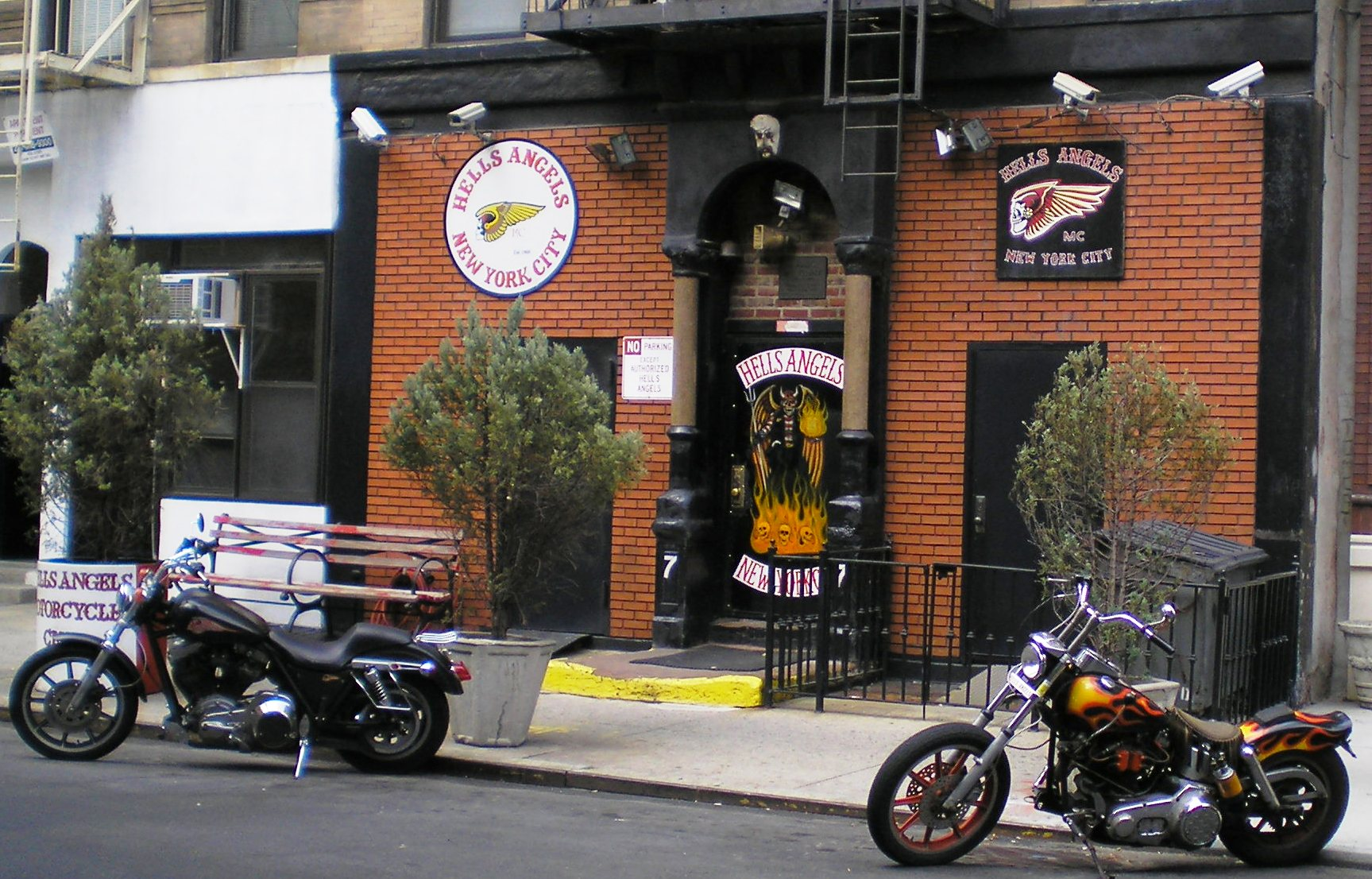
The former headquarters of the New York City chapter, at 77 East 3rd Street in the East Village neighbourhood in Manhattan.

Beginning in 1969, the headquarters of the New York City chapter of the Hells Angels was a six-story building at 77 East 3rd Street in the East Village neighbourhood of the Lower East Side of Manhattan. The first floor of the building served as the clubhouse of the chapter, while the upper five floors contained residential apartments that were mostly, but not exclusively, occupied by Hells Angels members.

A police raid on the East Village headquarters of the New York City Hells Angels chapter on March 18, 1972 resulted in five arrests and the seizure of guns, knives and explosive devices. The arrests of two Hells Angels members – Vincent "Big Vinnie" Girolamo and Anthony Morabito – and three women – Windy Stein, and sisters Mary and Janet Huber – were the climax of a week‐long investigation of the robbery and assault of a young Puerto Rican man which took place in the vicinity of the Hells Angels' clubhouse on March 12, 1972. Girolamo was charged with robbery and possession of brass knuckles and an imitation pistol, Stein with possession of a .38 caliber revolver and a machete, and Morabito and the Huber sisters with possession of a revolver, a bomb, a can of gunpowder and three incendiary flares. Two twelve‐gauge shotguns and nearly a thousand rounds of ammunition, an assortment of knives and an illegal device for tapping telephone lines were also seized. Local residents at the time also reported that the Hells Angels had been responsible for numerous incidents of violence, threats and harassment against various, predominantly African American, motorists and passersby in the area during the previous two years.

On March 4, 1978, New York City chapter sergeant-at-arms Vincent Girolamo was arrested following a six-month investigation and charged with the murder of his girlfriend Mary Ann Campbell, who he allegedly threw to her death from the roof of the chapter clubhouse on September 21, 1977. Released on a $50,000 bail, Girolamo died on September 12, 1979 of complications from a ruptured spleen, believed to have been sustained in a fight with Oakland, California chapter member Michael "Irish" O'Farrell. He was laid to rest at Saint Raymond's Cemetery in the Bronx, and his funeral was attended by Hells Angels from across the United States and Europe.

Angar Hussan, a fourteen-year-old Bengali immigrant, died at the Beth Israel Medical Center on July 5, 1990, a day after he was struck in the throat by metal shards from an exploding steel garbage can while watching M-80 firecrackers being set off at a Fourth of July block party sponsored by the Hells Angels outside the club's headquarters in the East Village. Three other bystanders were injured, two seriously. Hells Angels members Anthony Morabito and John Tannuzzo were charged with second-degree murder in Hussan's death on October 22, 1990. The motorcycle club as a corporation also was indicted on the charges. Of the two men charged with murder, one was convicted of criminally negligent homicide, and the case against the other was dismissed.

An Italian tourist, Diego Servetti, suffered a broken arm in an attack allegedly carried out by a biker wielding an ax handle after he sat on a motorcycle outside the clubhouse on April 30, 2006. No arrests were made in the incident.

On January 28, 2007, a woman named Roberta Shalaby was found badly beaten on the sidewalk outside the Hells Angels' clubhouse at 77 East Third Street in the East Village. The resulting investigation by the NYPD has been criticized by the group for its intensity. The police were refused access to the Hells Angels clubhouse and responded by closing off the area, setting up sniper positions, and sending in an armored personnel carrier. After obtaining a warrant, the police searched the clubhouse and arrested one Hells Angel who was later released. The group claims to have no connection with the beating of Shalaby. Five security cameras cover the entrance to the New York chapter's East 3rd Street club house, but the NY HAMC maintains nobody knows how Shalaby was beaten nearly to death at their front door. A club lawyer said they intended to sue the city of New York for false arrest and possible civil rights violations.

== Gang wars ==
=== Outlaws ===
The decades-long conflict between the Hells Angels and the Outlaws reportedly originated from a personal feud between two members of the Aliens biker gang in 1969, when the wife of Sandy Alexander was allegedly raped by fellow club member Peter "Greased Lightning" Rogers while Alexander was in California meeting with Hells Angels leader Sonny Barger. Rogers subsequently fled to Chicago and joined the Outlaws, becoming a senior member of the club. Alexander, meanwhile, also rose through the Hells Angels' hierarchy to a position of influence, second only to Barger.

At a party in New York City on December 31, 1973, Rogers was assaulted by two Hells Angels who seized and forcibly held him until Alexander arrived. Rogers was subsequently beaten and almost killed by Alexander in a one-on-one fight. In retaliation for the New Year's Eve incident, South Florida Outlaws leader James "Big Jim" Nolan allegedly ordered the killings of two members and a former member of the Lowell, Massachusetts Hells Angels chapter. "Whiskey" George E. Hartman, Jr. and Edwin Thomas "Riverboat" Riley were identified by rival bikers seeking revenge for the attack on Rogers while on a visit to the Outlaws' territory in Florida to supervise the covering up of Hells Angels tattoos belonging to Albert E. "Oskie" Simmons, who had relocated to Orlando, Florida to operate a motorcycle shop after leaving the club in 1973. Police believe Hartman and Riley were in Florida to source narcotics. They may also have been in pursuit of three Florida-bound members of the Lucifer's Henchmen, a fledgling motorcycle club with which the Hells Angels were feuding in Massachusetts. Hartman, Riley and Simmons were lured to a Fort Lauderdale, Florida tavern on April 27, 1974 under the pretence of a drug deal. They were then each bound with rope before being fatally shot in the head with a 12-gauge shotgun after being forced into a van at gunpoint and taken to a quarry near Andytown, Florida by four Outlaws members. The bodies of the Massachusetts trio were then weighed down with concrete cinder blocks and submerged in a flooded, twenty-feet deep rock pit, but were discovered on May 1, 1974 after one corpse became dislodged and was seen by a passing motorist. The other two were found by police divers.

Hartman and Riley received a Hells Angels burial in Lowell, while Simmons was laid to rest in Orlando. The Hells Angels determined that the Outlaws were responsible for the massacre after an internal investigation, and subsequently declared war on their rivals at a national meeting in Cleveland, which was attended by representatives of every club chapter. As a result, the Outlaws fortified their clubhouses with cinderblock walls and gunports on the orders of Chicago-based national president Harold "Stairway Harry" Henderson. The Hells Angels carried out several machine gun attacks on Outlaws headquarters in Georgia, Florida and Ohio in 1974 and 1975.

On September 25, 1994, two bikers were killed and at least eight were injured as members of the Hells Angels and the Outlaws fought with guns, knives and other weapons in what authorities believe was a pre-arranged encounter at the Lancaster National Speedway, a motorcycle speedway track in Lancaster. Rochester Hells Angels chapter president Michael J. "Mad Mike" Quale was fatally stabbed over a dozen times, and Buffalo Outlaws chapter president Walter "Buffalo Wally" Posnjak died from a gunshot wound to the chest. Two people were wounded by gunfire and several others were treated for stab wounds at the Erie County Medical Center. Fifteen people were arrested on weapons and drug charges in the aftermath. The melee had been preceded by a fight between Hells Angels and Outlaws members at a local bar the previous evening, and occurred at a time when the rival clubs were engaged in a turf war in the Midwest after the Hells Angels expanded into the Outlaws' home state of Illinois.

In a search for evidence relating to the fatal brawl, four police agencies utilized an armored vehicle and a New York State Police (NYSP) helicopter during sweeps of the Rochester Hells Angels chapter clubhouse, a pizzeria in the city, and a residence in the bordering town of Greece, New York, which uncovered eleven weapons and other suspicious items on December 22, 1994. Robert "Big Bob" Herold, the Hells Angels' former president in Rochester, was arrested on January 19, 1995 and charged with second-degree murder after a .44 Magnum revolver that had been used to kill Posnjak and was legally registered on Herold's pistol permit was discovered in his home. He and his girlfriend, Sheila Elmlinger, were also charged with possessing illegal weapons and stolen property in relation to eight unregistered weapons which were also found. Herold was acquitted of Posnjak's murder on March 29, 1996.

Rochester Hells Angels chapter members Patrick Lawless and James "Mitch" McAuley, Jr. were found in possession of two .357 Magnum handguns and a stolen .410 bore Mossberg shotgun while on route to kill members of the Kingsmen Motorcycle Club when they were stopped in a car by police in Granby on August 23, 2005. The conflict with the Fulton-based Kingsmen, an Outlaws support club, emerged due to the Hells Angels' belief that the Outlaws were trying to establish a chapter within their sphere of influence. The Hells Angels considered the area between Rochester and Syracuse their territory. McAuley pleaded guilty to conspiring to commit murder in aid of racketeering and was sentenced to eight years in prison on April 24, 2008. Lawless also pleaded guilty to participating in the scheme.

== Murder ==
College student Bruce Meyer was shot five times in the head at point-blank range with a .22 caliber handgun fitted with a silencer in the parking lot of his apartment building in Brewster on December 14, 1975. Law enforcement sources stated that Meyer was murdered by the former president of the Connecticut Hells Angels chapter in retaliation for him killing a Hells Angels member in a car crash on July 3, 1975. Frank Rosado was shot to death in the Bronx on Jan 2, 2020, where he was allegedly the leader of the local chapter of the Pagans. The police believed that this was in retaliation for an attack by the Pagans on the Hells Angels Bronx headquarters.

== Drug trafficking ==
Phillip A. DiOrio, a Hells Angel from Endicott, headed a cocaine ring in Broome County. He was one of seven people arrested during a series of drug raids carried out in the Triple Cities by a task force of New York and Pennsylvania police agencies on February 27, 1980, which also led to the seizure of three pounds of cocaine valued between $138,000 and $200,000. DiOrio pleaded guilty on September 23, 1981 to one count of criminal possession of a controlled substance, second degree. He was sentenced to eight years to life imprisonment with no right of appeal. Stephen Cudo, a Hells Angels associate from Factoryville, Pennsylvania, was also convicted and sentenced on related charges.

A methamphetamine trafficking network run by members and associates of the Hells Angels' Rochester chapter operating in Western New York from 2002 through July 9, 2010 was dismantled after an investigation by the Federal Bureau of Investigation (FBI), the Drug Enforcement Administration (DEA), the Genesee County Sheriff's Office, the New York State Police, the City of Batavia Police Department, and the Village of LeRoy Police Department. James Henry McAuley, Jr., the vice-president of the Rochester chapter and the leader of the drug ring, was sentenced to twenty-five years in prison in July 2016. Richard W. Mar, the former president of the club's Monterey (California) chapter, supplied the Rochester Hells Angels with methamphetamine and trafficked the drug to New York from California; he was sentenced to ten years in federal prison in August 2016. Rochester Hells Angels members Richard E. Riedman and Jeffrey A. Tyler, and three associates – Donna Boon (McAuley's wife), Gordon Montgomery and Paul Griffin – pleaded guilty to drug trafficking offenses based on their roles in the conspiracy; Riedman was sentenced to thirty-seven months in prison, Tyler to eighteen months in prison, Boon to three years probation and twelve months of home incarceration, Montgomery to sixty months in prison, and Griffin to probation. Additionally, Rochester Hells Angels member Robert W. "Bugsy" Moran, Jr. was sentenced to eighteen months in prison and Gina Tata was sentenced to three years probation, while Timothy M. Stone was sentenced to twelve months in prison on charges related to the case.

== Operation Roughrider ==
The New York City chapter of the Hells Angels began manufacturing and distributing methamphetamine in mid-1978, with chapter president Sandy Alexander providing the drug formula, vice president Howard "Howie" Weisbrod supplying the phenylacetone (P2P) used in the manufacturing process, and Paul Francis "K.C." Casey acting as the primary manufacturer. Alexander served as the chapter's president from its inception on December 5, 1969 until March 25, 1984, and also led the club's East Coast and European chapters. Casey manufactured the drug in a series of locations in Staten Island and Connecticut. Half of the methamphetamine produced by Casey went to Weisbrod's P2P supplier, and the other half to Weisbrod, who then distributed the drug to New York City chapter members for retail sales. Alexander was also given some of the profits from the methamphetamine enterprise as compensation for providing the formula. During this period, virtually all of the methamphetamine sold by the Hells Angels on the East Coast was distributed by Alexander, Weisbrod and Casey. Alexander also sold cocaine that he sourced from Jerry Buitendorp. Having methamphetamine laboratories on the East Coast provided the New York Hells Angels with easy access to large quantities of the drug without risking shipments from California, where most of the gang's labs were located, and allowed them to become self-sustaining rather than being reliant on chapters on the West Coast.

The methamphetamine trade became so lucrative that the New York Hells Angels formed a "methamphetamine distribution board" to assess how much of the drug to provide and how to divide it among other chapters. The Mid-State chapter, based in Binghamton and Troy, obtained narcotics from members of the New York City chapter. The Hells Angels also maintained a weapons trafficking route stretching from North Carolina to New York City and the Capital District. According to federal documents, the Hells Angels utilized an extensive counter-surveillance system to prevent law enforcement infiltration that allegedly included a contact in the New York City Police Department (NYPD) and a federal prosecutor in Albany.

The methamphetamine ring headed by Alexander, Weisbrod and Casey began to break down in 1983 and ceased completely in the spring of 1984 when Weisbrod's P2P source dried up. Members of the New York City chapter continued to distribute methamphetamine obtained from other sources. Alexander was succeeded as chapter president by William "Wild Bill" Medeiros in March 1984. Madeiros left the post after four months to resume the position of sergeant-at-arms, and Casey then assumed the presidency. Due to dissatisfaction with restrictions on methamphetamine distribution imposed by Alexander, several members of the New York City charter, including Charles "Charming Chuck" Zito, broke away to form the New York Nomads chapter based in the Hudson Valley on November 11, 1984, in order to distribute greater quantities of the drug than was permitted in the City chapter. The Nomads chapter established a semi-autonomous methamphetamine distribution business, and allegedly controlled drug labs in Westchester and Putnam counties. The Hells Angels' base of operations in Westchester County was at Big Joe's Tattoo Parlor in Mount Vernon, owned by Joel Kaplan.

A Federal Bureau of Investigation (FBI) investigation of the Hells Angels codenamed Operation Roughrider commenced after Vernon Hartung, an inmate at the Federal Correctional Institution, Petersburg, Virginia, contacted the bureau and became a confidential informant. Following his release from prison on April 2, 1982, Hartung was introduced to San Francisco Hells Angels chapter president Gary Kautzman by Robert "Hoss" Hall, president of the Richmond, Virginia-based Confederate Angels Motorcycle Club. Along with undercover FBI agent Kevin P. Bonner, Hartung met with Kautzman on the pretext of seeking authorization to establish a Hells Angels chapter in Baltimore, a ruse which allowed Bonner to infiltrate the club over a 26-month period. Beginning in March 1983, Bonner posed as a Baltimore drug dealer interested in purchasing methamphetamine and cocaine from the Hells Angels, and he made narcotics transactions with members of eleven chapters across the country, including New York City chapter president Sandy Alexander and Mid-State chapter vice president James "Gorilla" Harwood.

Operation Roughrider culminated with the arrests of 133 Hells Angels members and associates on racketeering and drug trafficking charges after over a thousand law enforcement personnel carried out approximately fifty coordinated raids in eleven U.S. states on May 2, 1985. $2.6 million in cocaine, marijuana, methamphetamine, hashish, PCP and LSD, as well as weapons including Uzi submachine guns and rocket launchers were seized. Fifteen of the arrests took place in the New York metropolitan area, where the New York City chapter headquarters on the Lower East Side of Manhattan was raided, and at least one Uzi and an undetermined quantity of drugs were discovered. A further 19 club members and associates were taken into custody in Albany and Broome counties.

Arrest warrants were also issued for two Hells Angels, Herbert "One-Eyed Bert" Kittel and New York Nomads chapter president Chuck Zito, who were working as bodyguards for Bon Jovi on tour in Japan at the time. Kittel and Zito surrendered to the United States Embassy in Tokyo on July 22, 1985 after they were the subject of a nationwide dragnet by Japanese police at the request of the FBI. On October 14, 1985, the Tokyo High Court approved an extradition request by U.S. authorities, and, after detaining the pair in a Tokyo prison for four months, the Japanese Ministry of Justice released them into the custody of U.S. Justice Department officials in Tokyo on October 26, 1985. Medeiros was a fugitive from justice until October 1985. He, along with Harwood and John "Pirate" Miller, subsequently agreed to cooperate with the government and enter the Federal Witness Protection Program.

On December 12, 1985, Alexander and Weisbrod, a Jewish Hells Angel, pleaded guilty to federal narcotics distribution charges, while chapter secretary Charles Neuman pleaded guilty to conspiracy. Alexander was sentenced to sixteen years' imprisonment on February 13, 1986 and was paroled from prison in August 1993. On March 27, 1986, Mid-State members Kim D. "Mr. Fun" DiLuzio and Ronald G. "Big Cheese" Cheeseman were sentenced to fifteen and 26 years' imprisonment, respectively, after pleading guilty to federal racketeering and narcotics conspiracy charges. Three associates – Janet "Puffy" Beam Cheeseman, James Lee "The Mayor" Farrigan and Richard D. "Piggy" Cirzeveto – were also given sentences of two, fifteen and eighteen years for drug trafficking and extortion.

Cheeseman, president of the Binghamton and Mid-State chapters, was sentenced on April 1, 1986 to an additional six-to-eighteen-year sentence, to run concurrently, after pleading guilty to first-degree sodomy, a charge stemming from a video cassette showing him engaged in sexual acts with a seven-year-old boy and an eleven-year-old girl found when federal, state and local authorities searched his residence. The same day, seven other Hells Angels members and associates – Orville Deitz, Philip Kramer, Raymond "Butch" Lindsay, John "The Baptist" LoFranco, Patti Milhomme Root, Maureen "Mo" Pompey and Martin "Tiny" Pulver – were sentenced to prison terms of between six months and twenty-three years in the U.S. District Court for the Northern District of New York in Albany after pleading guilty to various federal charges. LoFranco, a professional boxer and high-ranking member of the Nomads chapter, had pled guilty to three conspiracy counts, for racketeering, narcotics and extortion conspiracy, on February 3, 1986, and was paroled from prison in 1994 after serving nine years of a 23-year sentence.

Zito pleaded guilty to one felony drug count in late 1986 and was sentenced to ten years' imprisonment. His sentence was reduced to seven years' in 1988, and he ultimately served six years in federal prison. Casey pleaded guilty to conspiracy, manufacturing and distribution on November 2, 1987. Brendan Manning, who succeeded Casey as New York City chapter president, was convicted on December 11, 1987 of conspiracy and distribution of methamphetamine.

In an effort to seize the Hells Angels' New York City chapter clubhouse, the federal government filed a complaint against the building on May 1, 1985, alleging that it was subject to forfeiture under federal drug forfeiture laws, which had been amended by Congress on October 12, 1984, to permit forfeiture of real property used for narcotics-related activities. Sandy Alexander, his wife Colette Alexander and the Church of Angels – a moniker under which the HAMC was incorporated as a nonprofit religious organization in New York state – subsequently intervened as claimants in the action. On February 4, 1994, after an approximately five-week trial, a jury returned a verdict in favor of the claimants, who they determined had proven that the premises was not used, or intended to be used, to commit, or to facilitate the commission of, a felony drug violation between October 12, 1984 and May 2, 1985.

== Most Wanted ==
In 2018, the FBI and United States Marshals Service announced a reward for Hells Angels gang member Christopher Slightam.
