= Dirty Dozen Motorcycle Club =

Outlaw motorcycle club

Dirty Dozen MC
- Dirty Dozen insignia
- Founded: 1964; 62 years ago
- Years active: 1964–1997
- Territory: 6 chapters in Arizona
- Membership (est.): 120
- Activities: Drug trafficking, arms trafficking, prostitution, assault and murder
- Allies: Hells Angels MC
- Rivals: Mongols MC; Vagos MC

The Dirty Dozen Motorcycle Club (DDMC) was an outlaw motorcycle club in Arizona. Founded in 1964, the Dirty Dozen became the preeminent motorcycle gang in the state, and ultimately merged with the Hells Angels in 1997.

== History ==
The Dirty Dozen MC was established by twelve founding members in 1964. While some sources erroneously claim that the Dirty Dozen were named after the 1967 film of the same name, the club was in fact formed prior to the release of the film. The club's insignia consisted of a pair of dice with the sixes facing out, and cobwebs trailing off the sides. The Dirty Dozen's membership peaked at approximately 120, with at least six chapters located in Phoenix, Mesa, Tucson, Cave Creek and Flagstaff, as well as a nomads chapter. The club's leadership consisted of a state president, who was deputized by a state vice-president, or "warlord". Among the Dirty Dozen's most prominent traditions was the annual Florence Prison Run, which began in the early 1970s. Held each February, the drive-by salute to those incarcerated at Florence State Prison has drawn thousands of motorcycle enthusiast yearly.

=== Criminalization ===
The Dirty Dozen became the largest and most violent motorcycle gang in Arizona, and would not allow other outlaw biker clubs to operate in the state without their permission. An increase in the club's membership size came in turn with a series of violent attacks on law enforcement personnel, rival gang members, and local citizens. Incidents included the attempted murder of a police officer, assaults on bar patrons, and bomb and gun attacks on businesses and residences. Members were also found in possession of large caches of weapons. The club also became associated with Mafia figures in Phoenix in relation to massage parlors and strongarm violence.

A series of shootings and fights broke out between members of the Dirty Dozen and the rival Seekers MC after two Seekers bikers were wounded by shots fired by unknown assailants on Interstate 10 north of Tucson on February 26, 1976. The feud resulted in its first fatality on March 29, 1976, when Bruce Ritter was shot dead by a sniper while he was visiting the southeast Tucson residence of his brother-in-law, a Dirty Dozen member. The killing of Ritter took place while representatives of both clubs were meeting to discuss bringing an end to the escalating conflict. Expanded discussions took place the following day when two members each of the Dirty Dozen, the Seekers, the Devils Diciples, the Sons of Odin and the Soul Sinners met with authorities at the Pima County Sheriff's Department headquarters and "agreed to exercise control of their brothers so that these incidents stop". According to law enforcement officials, the feud was in relation to territorial control of riding and drinking areas among the estimated 250 outlaw bikers in the Tucson area.

In 1979, the Dirty Dozen established a clubhouse in Claypool. Outnumbering the local police, the club had virtual impunity to commit crime in the town, and members became known for harassing and assaulting residents of the area. The Dirty Dozen came into conflict the following year with the Bad Company MC, a club from New Mexico who were attempting to form a chapter in nearby Globe, resulting in two local Bad Company members, David Howell and Laird Kriley, being badly beaten and ordered to disband. Howell and Kriley persisted in wearing their club's colors in the area, however, and they were summoned to a meeting with Dirty Dozen member Robert "Chico" Mora, who had been dispatched from Tucson, at a Globe roadhouse. Howell and Kriley were both shot dead by Mora, who claimed he was ambushed by the pair in the bar's bathroom. Eleven Dirty Dozen bikers from the Phoenix area, including club president Gary "Greasy" Stacy, were subsequently arrested in connection with the killings by a contingent of local and state police. Mora eventually surrendered to the Gila County Sheriff's Office and was charged with first-degree murder. He ultimately pleaded guilty to manslaughter and was sentenced to five years in prison in December 1980. Several club members in Phoenix were also convicted of attempting to peddle $250,000 worth of counterfeit currency in order to raise $40,000 for Mora's defense fund. They were each sentenced to six months' imprisonment and three years' probation.

A war broke out over control of prostitution rackets in Tucson between the local Dirty Dozen chapter and the Mongols chapter in the city, which was formed in May 1982. Subsequently, the Mongols allied themselves with the Outlaws, who had established a presence in Tucson after the club's former Florida president James "Big Jim" Nolan moved to the city. The Dirty Dozen, in turn, formed an alliance with the Hells Angels, who became the club's main supplier of methamphetamine. Several senior Dirty Dozen members were subsequently convicted of methamphetamine trafficking.

In 1983, 44-year-old electrician John Turner was shot and killed by an unidentified individual when he attempted to use his pickup truck to run over a row of over twenty motorcycles belonging to Dirty Dozen members outside Gary's Lounge, a north Phoenix bar. Turner had earlier been ejected from the bar by patrons after he asked the girlfriend of a biker to dance.

On August 12, 1983, Dirty Dozen member John Leslie "Puff" Huey kidnapped the 19-year-old girlfriend of another club member, Ed Ibarra, from her trailer home in Tucson and took her to his Phoenix residence, where he held her captive for seven days, raped and tortured her. He was sentenced to a minimum of 166 years in prison in June 1984 after being convicted on one count of kidnapping and nine counts of sexual assault. On August 30, 1984, a case in which Huey was charged with six counts of sexual conduct with a minor, two counts of child molesting and one count of child prostitution ended in a mistrial due to a hung jury. He was accused of molesting and prostituting the 13-year-old sister of his girlfriend, Pamela Jean McQuillen, between December 1982 and February 1983 after McQuillen had "gifted" the girl to Huey as a Christmas present. McQuillen was convicted of three counts of sexual conduct with a minor, two counts of child prostitution and one count of child molestation on August 14, 1984, and she was sentenced to 42 years' imprisonment on October 5, 1984. Standing trial for a second time, Huey was convicted in April 1985 of four counts of sexually assaulting a minor and two counts of child molesting. The jury was unable to reach a verdict on two counts of sexual assault and one count of child prostitution. On June 14, 1985, he was sentenced to a 168-year prison term.

Dirty Dozen president Chris "Porker" Sexton Baucum was among at least fifteen people arrested and charged with narcotics offences on January 24, 1984, following a 19-month undercover investigation into a Phoenix-based drug distribution network allegedly consisting of members of the Dirty Dozen as well as independent bikers. According to authorities, the drug ring also operated in California, Colorado, Kansas, and South Dakota, and was connected to the Mafia. As part of the investigation, police served 52 search warrants between June 1982 and February 1983, seizing $157,537 worth of various narcotics, 150 guns and 1,554 rounds of ammunition.

One Dirty Dozen member, Charlie Prest, was allegedly handcuffed and beaten by off-duty police officers working as security at a David Allan Coe concert in Tempe on December 2, 1984, and two others claimed they were maced when they attempted to intercede. All three were then jailed. The police officers testified that they had acted with reasonable force and that the bikers had precipitated the violence. On April 30, 1985, Prest was convicted of disorderly conduct at Phoenix City Court.

A five-month joint drug investigation by the Arizona Department of Public Safety (DPS) and Federal Bureau of Investigation (FBI) resulted in 44 Dirty Dozen members and associates being arrested on federal charges of conspiracy to distribute methamphetamine on February 5, 1985. According to the indictments, the Dirty Dozen had conspired to take control of the methamphetamine trade in Arizona, and carried out counterintelligence operations against rival motorcycle gangs and law enforcement personnel. Nine Dirty Dozen members, including club leaders, pled guilty and were imprisoned as a result of the investigation.

On March 27, 1986, Dirty Dozen associate Kenneth Dale Gann was arrested in Pima County as part of Operation One Percenter, a 12-month investigation by the Bureau of Alcohol, Tobacco, Firearms and Explosives (ATF) targeting motorcycle gangs. Operation One Percenter resulted in the arrests of 53 members and associates of 18 different biker gangs on various weapons and narcotics charges, during a series of raids in 18 U.S. states, and the seizure of 10 sawed-off shotguns, 10 machine guns, 63 rifles, 100 handguns, 4,500 rounds of ammunition, six silencers, a bomb, four hand grenades, five pounds of dynamite, 15 stolen vehicles, a stolen computer and a drug lab, as well as large quantities of cocaine, marijuana and PCP.

In 1990, the Dirty Dozen became involved in a conflict with the Vagos after the California-based club expanded into Arizona, establishing a chapter in Phoenix. The Vagos were ultimately vanquished from the city after a number of shootings and bombings, including a pipe bomb attack on the residence of Donald "Arizona Don" Halterman, the president of the Vagos' Phoenix chapter. The Dirty Dozen–Vagos war resulted in a number of bystanders becoming casualties.

On September 23, 1992, a 14-month investigation by a task force consisting of the DPS organized crime division, the FBI, the ATF, and the Phoenix and Mesa police departments culminated with over 400 law enforcement officers serving 68 search warrants on the residences of Dirty Dozen members in Maricopa, Pima, Yavapai and Pinal counties. 20 ounces of marijuana, five ounces of methamphetamine, one-half ounce of cocaine, a trace of LSD, 38 Harley-Davidson motorcycles and eleven other vehicles, over 1,200 guns, knives and other weapons, and approximately $18,000 in cash were seized as potential evidence. A former club member, Robert Gonzales, was a prime informant in the case. More than 40 people were indicted on charges including conspiracy to distribute drugs, drug possession, weapons violations and fraud as a result of the evidence gathered after a state grand jury issued a 145-count indictment in January 1993. Like the earlier 1985 operation against the Dirty Dozen, the raids of 1992 weakened the club but did not lead to its disbanding as intended.

=== Merger with the Hells Angels ===
The Dirty Dozen came to the attention of Sonny Barger, the reputed national leader of the Hells Angels, while he was serving a four-year sentence for conspiracy at FCI Phoenix in Arizona between 1989 and 1992. In July 1996, the Hells Angels' Oakland, California chapter voted in favor of expanding their club into Arizona by amalgamating the Dirty Dozen, and the majority of the Dirty Dozen's membership voted to "patch over" to join the Hells Angels. Robert Mora, the Dirty Dozen's Tucson chapter president, was credited with being responsible for the merger due to his incessant campaigning, as he sought a larger network of bikers to do business with. Motions to merge the Dirty Dozen with the Angels had been unsuccessful in previous years. The amalgamation was also mutually beneficial for the Hells Angels, as it allowed the club to expand into a state with lax motorcycle helmet restrictions and a terrain ideal for motorcycle riding. Law enforcement authorities have also alleged that Arizona's close proximity to Mexico has allowed the Angels to trade in firearms and methamphetamine with near-impunity. During the Dirty Dozen's fourteen-month probationary period, numerous members – including at least one former police officer – were expelled as they were deemed unworthy of becoming Hells Angels. Those who voted against the "patch over" were forced to retire from the outlaw biker subculture and ordered never to wear the Dirty Dozen's colors again. The merger between the Dirty Dozen and the Hells Angels was consecrated during a meeting of members from both clubs at the Oakland chapter clubhouse in October 1997.

In 1998, Barger left his longtime Oakland chapter to join the Cave Creek chapter. His role within the Arizona Hells Angels was reportedly an advisory position, as he did not hold officer status and he rarely attended rallies or public events. Barger was also a member of the Yavapai County chapter before he returned to Oakland in 2016.
