= Sacramento Valley National Cemetery =

Veterans cemetery in Solano County, California

Coordinates: 38°24′50″N 121°52′26″W

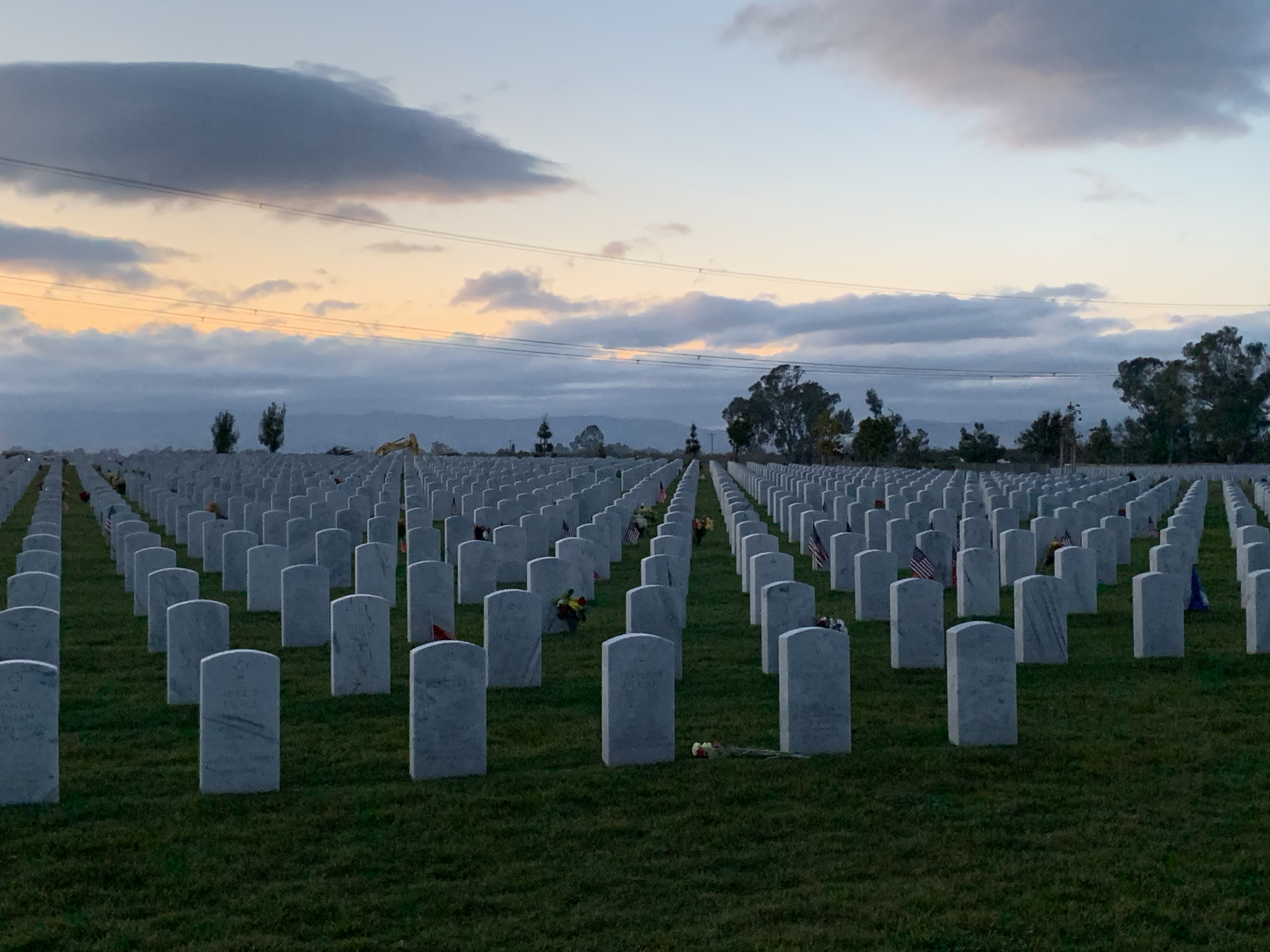
- Landscape of the Sacramento Valley National Cemetery
- Interactive map of Sacramento Valley National Cemetery

Details
- Established: 2006
- Type: United States National Cemetery
- Size: 561 acres (227 ha)

Sacramento Valley National Cemetery is a 561 acres (227 ha) United States National Cemetery located about 3 miles (4.8 km) southwest of Dixon, Solano County, California. The cemetery is intersected by the Union Pacific Railroad in the southeast of the cemetery. Opened for burials in 2006 with an initial 14 acres (5.7 ha) development, the Department of Veterans Affairs intends this site to serve needs for the next 50 years. The cemetery is the seventh national cemetery built in the state, and the 124th national cemetery built in the U.S.

== History ==
The 9 parcels of land that would eventually make up the cemetery were used as farmland from 1860 to 2004. In 2004, the land was purchased by the National Cemetery Administration and in 2006 the cemetery opened for burials, with the site being officially dedicated on April 22, 2007.

== Notable interments ==
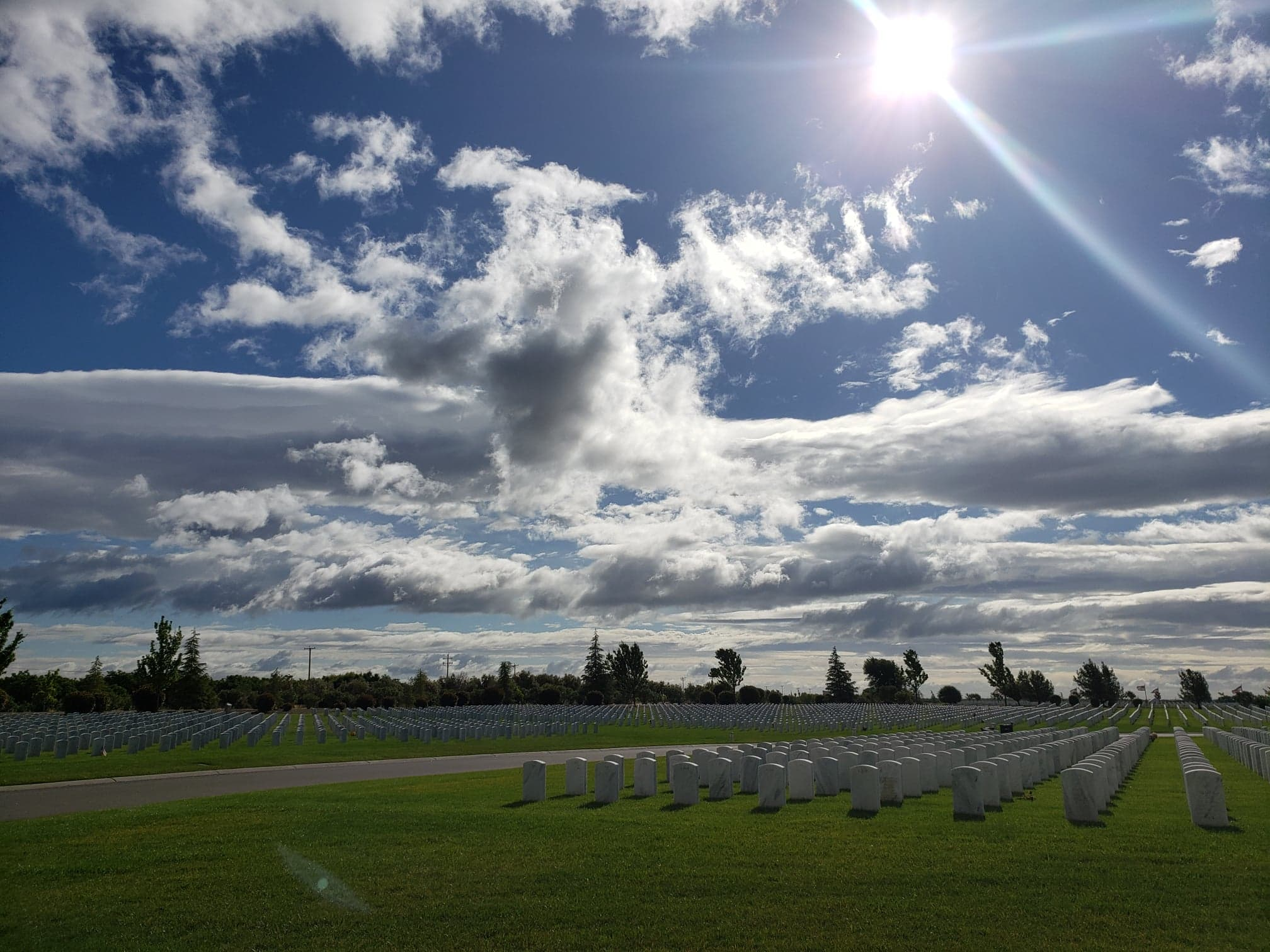
View of the Sacramento Valley National Cemetery

- Sonny Barger (1938–2022) – Hells Angels leader and founding member
- Marty Feldman (1922–2015) – Head Coach of the Oakland Raiders, World War II US Marine who fought in Guadalcanal, inducted into the Stanford Athletic Hall of Fame
- Earsell Mackbee (1941–2009) – US Air Force airman and professional football player
- Jimmy McCracklin (1921–2012) – Pianist, vocalist, and songwriter
- Chuck Tatum (1926–2014) – World War II veteran, Bronze Star Medal recipient, race car driver and builder
- William W. Turner (1927–2015), writer and FBI agent.
- George Winslow (1946–2015) – Child actor of the 1950s known for his stentorian voice and deadpan demeanor
