= Sonny Barger =

American outlaw biker (1938–2022)

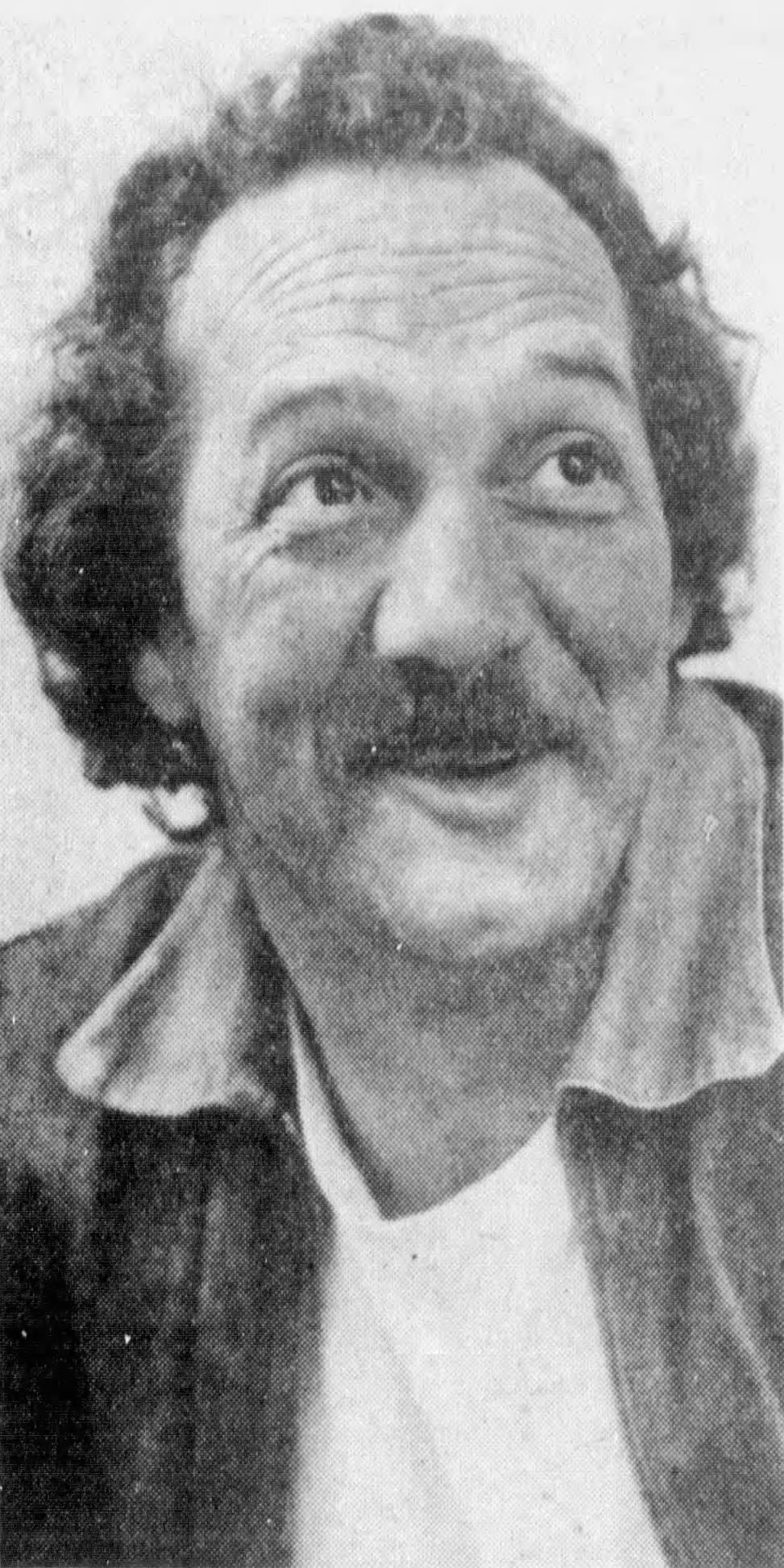
- Barger in 1975
- Born: Ralph Hubert Barger Jr. October 8, 1938; Modesto, California, U.S.
- Died: June 29, 2022 (aged 83); Livermore, California, U.S.
- Resting place: Sacramento Valley National Cemetery
- Other name: "Chief"
- Occupations: Outlaw biker; crime boss; author; actor
- Known for: Founding member, Hells Angels Oakland chapter
- Spouses: Elsie Mae George (died 1967) Sharon Gruhlke (m. 1973, divorced) Beth Noel Black (div. 2003) Zorana Katzakian (m. 2005)
- Allegiance: Hells Angels (1957–2022)
- Convictions: Assault with the intent to murder (1965); Possession of narcotics with intent to distribute (1973); Conspiracy to transport and receive explosives in interstate commerce with intent to kill and damage buildings (1988); Aggravated assault (2003)
- Penalty: 10 years-to-life imprisonment (1973); 4 years imprisonment (1989); 8 days imprisonment (2003)
- Website: Official website

Ralph Hubert "Sonny" Barger Jr. (October 8, 1938 – June 29, 2022) was an American outlaw biker who was a founding member of the Oakland, California, charter of the Hells Angels in 1957. After forming the Oakland charter, Barger was instrumental in unifying various disparate Hells Angels charters and had the club incorporated in 1966. He emerged as the Hells Angels' most prominent member during the counterculture era and was reputed by law enforcement and media to be the club's international president, an allegation he repeatedly denied. The author Hunter S. Thompson called Barger "the Maximum Leader" of the Hells Angels, and Philip Martin of the Phoenix New Times described him as "the archetypical Hells Angel", saying he "didn't found the motorcycle club ... but he constructed the myth". Barger authored five books, and appeared on television and in film.

Barger served a total of 13 years in prison, following a conviction for heroin trafficking in 1974, and a 1988 conviction for conspiracy to bomb the clubhouse of a rival motorcycle club, the Outlaws. He was also acquitted of murder in 1972, and of racketeering in 1980. Barger rejected accusations from law enforcement characterizing the Hells Angels as an organized crime syndicate, and maintained that the club should not be held accountable for crimes committed by individual members.

== Early life ==
Ralph Hubert Barger Jr. was born in Modesto, California, on October 8, 1938, the son of Kathryn Carmella (née Ritch) and Ralph Hubert Barger. His father had German and Dutch ancestry, and his mother was of Italian descent. His mother left the family when Barger was four months old, leaving him and his older sister Shirley to be raised by their Pentecostal grandmother and alcoholic father, a day laborer on the Oakland docks. Barger grew up in Oakland in the post-war era, during which time the city's shipbuilding and automobile industries went into decline, leading to a significant rise in unemployment.

Growing up, Barger was suspended from school several times for assaulting teachers, and he often fought with other boys. He dropped out of school in the tenth grade. Although many of his school friends became drug addicts, Barger worked at a grocery store and enlisted in the U.S. Army, aged sixteen in 1955. He was given an honorable discharge fourteen months later when it was discovered that he had forged his birth certificate in order to be able to join. Barger had liked the discipline, masculine camaraderie, and learning how to disassemble weapons. After his return from the Army, Barger drifted between menial jobs and lived with his father in a single residence at a hotel, later moving in with his sister and her children.

== Hells Angels ==
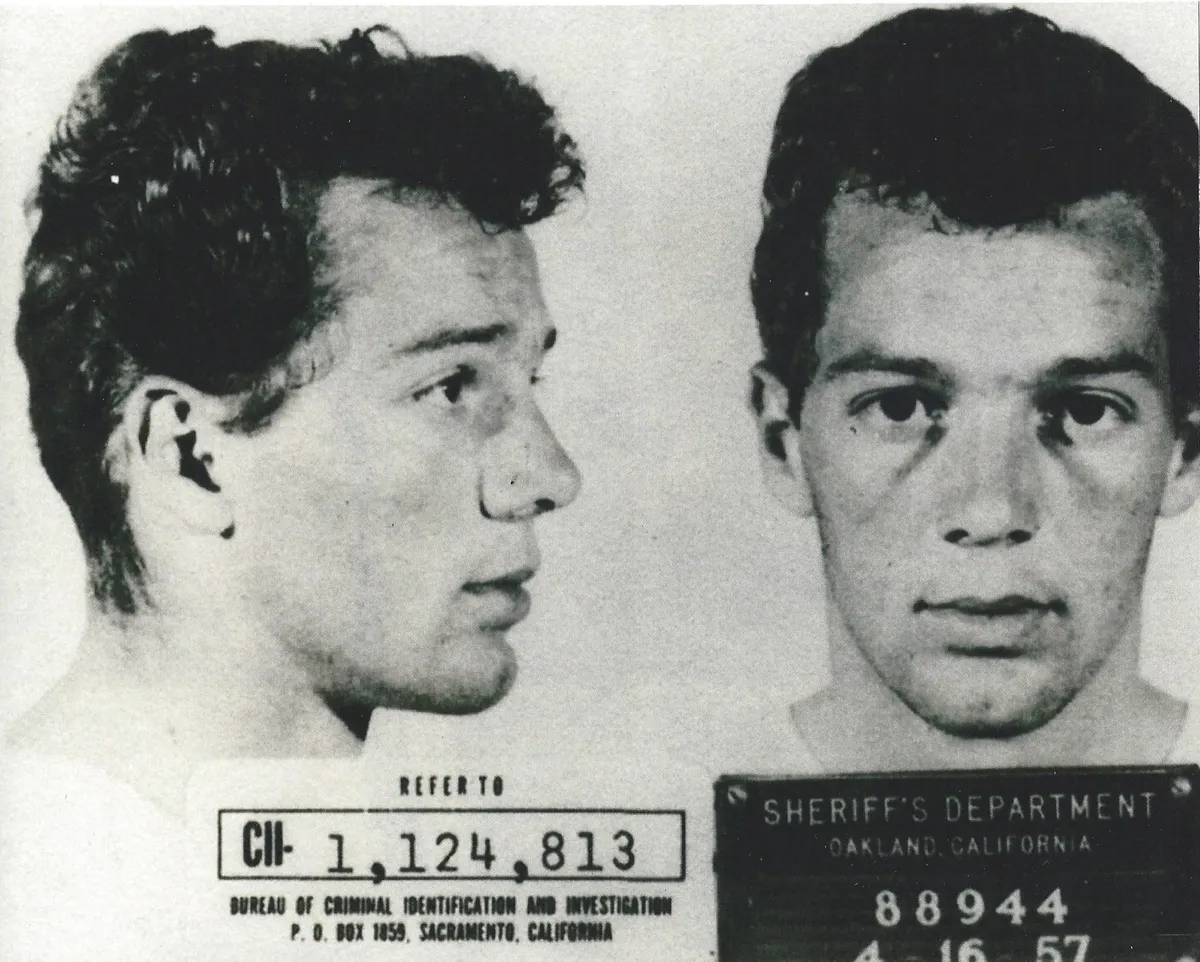
Barger, aged 18, in a 1957 mugshot

In 1956, Barger joined his first motorcycle club, the Oakland Panthers, which he founded with a group of fellow military veterans. After that club disbanded, he started riding with another group of bikers, one of whom, Don "Boots" Reeves, wore a patch that belonged to a defunct Nomads chapter of the Hells Angels in North Sacramento. Founding their own Hells Angels club on April 1, 1957, each member wore the patch – a small skull wearing an aviator cap set within a set of wings, later copyrighted as the Hells Angels' "Death's Head" logo – after having replicas made at a trophy store in Hayward.

Barger was not the founder of the Hells Angels as is often claimed – the group was founded in 1948 – but he became its best known member to such an extent that he is often misidentified as the club's founder. He and the Oakland Hells Angels were initially unaware that there were several other, loosely affiliated clubs using the same name throughout California. The founding members of the Oakland Hells Angels were "basically honest blue-collar or unskilled workers looking for excitement", according to George "Baby Huey" Wethern, who became the chapter vice president in 1960. Unlike the World War II veterans who formed the early Hells Angels chapters, many of the founding members of the Oakland chapter were former servicemen with disreputable military records. Barger described his chapter as a "wild bunch".

After a chance encounter with a member of a pre-existing Hells Angels chapter, Barger learned of the club's history, rules, regulations and procedures. He was appointed president of the Oakland chapter in 1958 following a series of meetings with Hells Angels from Southern California. With Barger as president, the Oakland Hells Angels traveled around California and amalgamated with the other Hells Angels chapters, dividing territory and forming club bylaws. While infighting did occur between the chapters, conflicts predominantly arose with other clubs such as the Gypsy Jokers.

When Otto Friedli, the founder of the original San Bernardino Hells Angels chapter, was imprisoned in 1958, Barger was proclaimed de facto national president. One of his first actions was to relocate the club's "mother chapter" – the national headquarters – from San Bernardino to Oakland. Later that year, Barger suffered a fractured skull during a fight with Oakland police. Although the basic organization was in place when Barger assumed leadership of the club, he introduced additional rules pertaining to new members, club officers, and the establishment of new chapters. Under Barger's leadership, the club's membership began to increase. By 1960, the Oakland Hells Angels had established an extensive narcotics network within the club. Some of Barger's rules included "no using dope during a meeting" and "no drug burns" (rip-offs). The Hells Angels worked as "part-time distributors" of drugs in the 1950s and early 1960s.

According to George Wethern – who left the Hells Angels in 1972 and went on to testify against the club before entering the Federal Witness Protection Program – in his 1978 book A Wayward Angel, Barger convened a meeting of the leaders of the Hells Angels and other California motorcycle clubs in 1960 in which the various clubs parleyed over the mutual problem of police harassment. The clubs voted to ally under a "1%" patch to be worn on their respective "colors". The term refers to a comment allegedly made by the American Motorcyclist Association (AMA) that 99% of motorcyclists were law-abiding citizens, implying the last one percent were outlaws. In 1961, Barger opened the first Hells Angels chapter abroad in New Zealand.

The Oakland chapter, with Barger serving as its president, assumed an informal position of authority within the Hells Angels that began following a confrontation with local police and the California Highway Patrol in the aftermath of an outlaw motorcycle meeting in Porterville in September 1963. Although always a predominantly male organization, the Hells Angels had female members until 1964 when Barger imposed a rule making the club male only. He justified the male-only rule on the grounds that female Hells Angels were less able to defend themselves against rival bikers seeking to steal their patches. Barger was employed as a machine operator from 1960 to 1965, when he was dismissed due to extended absences. His criminal record began in 1963 after he was arrested for possession of marijuana. He was arrested again on the same charge the following year, and for assault with a deadly weapon in 1965 and 1966. In the 1965 incident, he forced his pistol into a bar patron's mouth after the man had made disparaging remarks about the Hells Angels. Barger claims the gun fired by accident, but wrote in his 2000 autobiography Hell's Angel: The Life and Times of Sonny Barger and the Hells Angels Motorcycle Club: "since the motherfucker was already shot in the head, I bent him over the pool table and shot him again". Barger was convicted of assault with the intent to murder. When a rival club of bikers stole Barger's motorcycle, he and his members assaulted them with spiked dog collars, whipped them with bullwhips, and then used ballpeen hammers to break their fingers.

The Oakland Hells Angels maintained a prominent position as "first among equals" by having the largest membership of any U.S. chapter and because of Barger's esteem among club members internationally. The author and journalist Hunter S. Thompson wrote in his 1967 book Hell's Angels: The Strange and Terrible Saga of the Outlaw Motorcycle Gangs that "in any gathering of Hell's Angels, there is no doubt who is running the show", describing Barger as "a 6-foot, 170-pound warehouseman from East Oakland, the coolest head in the lot, and a tough, quick-thinking dealer when any action starts", and saying of him: "By turns he is a fanatic, a philosopher, a brawler, a shrewd compromiser and a final arbitrator." Barger continually denied that he was the Hells Angels' leader or that Oakland was the club's headquarters, however, saying: "There’s no charter that's the boss. That's all cops and newspapers."

=== Counterculture era ===
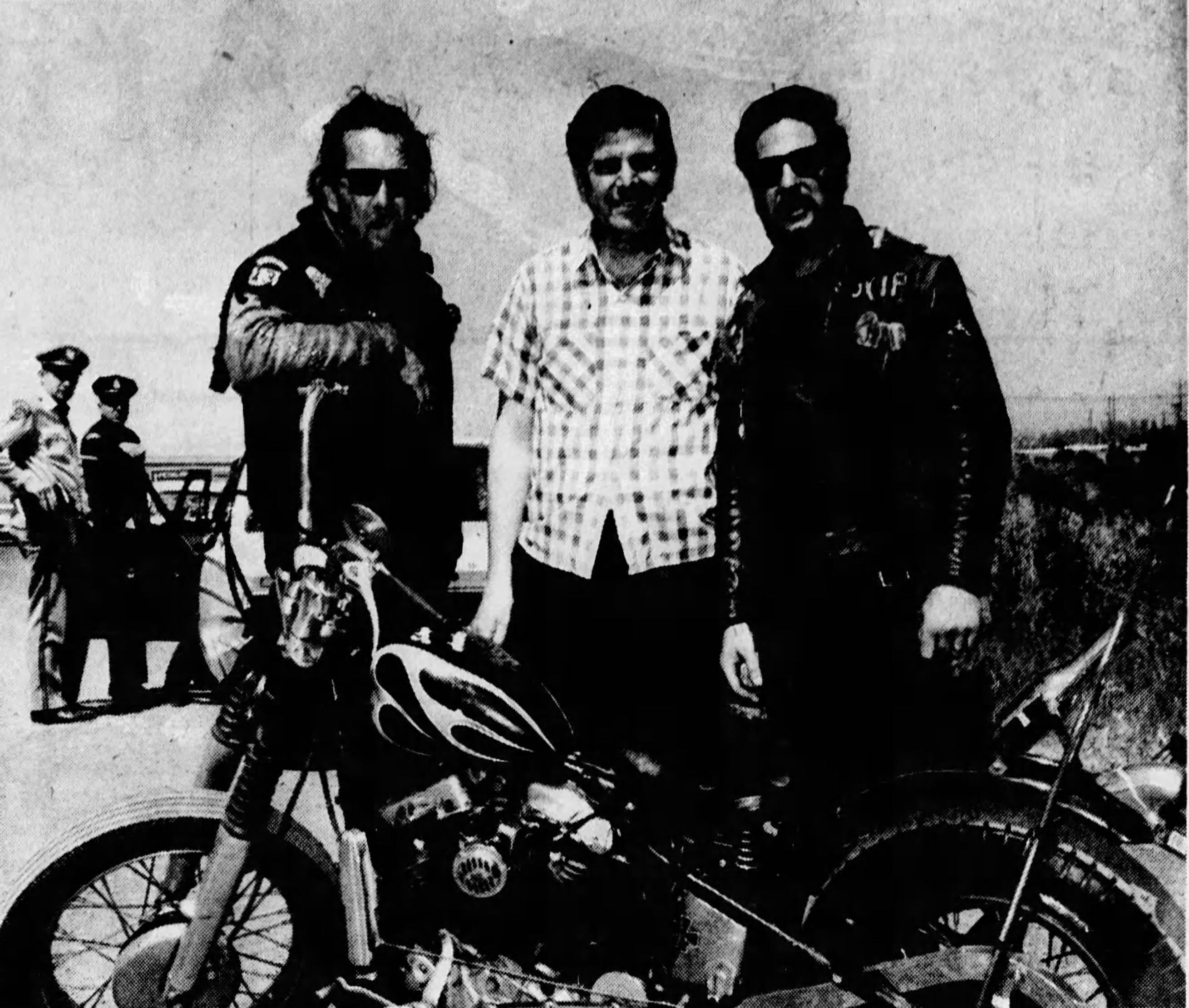
Barger (left) with columnist Bill Soberanes and Hells Angel Cliff Workman in 1968

Barger and the Hells Angels, many of whom were military veterans, considered themselves anti-communist and anti-subversive patriots. In 1964, Barger and another Hells Angel, Michael "Tiny" Walters, told an Oakland Tribune columnist: "Our oath is allegiance to the United States of America. If there should be trouble we would jump to enlist and fight. More than 90 per cent of our members are veterans. We don't want no slackers." When students at the University of California, Berkeley announced an anti-Vietnam War rally, the Oakland Hells Angels denounced the rally as "a despicable un-American activity". On October 16, 1965, Barger led a group of Hells Angels in an attack on anti-war demonstrators marching from Berkeley to the Army Terminal in Oakland to protest against munitions shipments. The Oakland police reportedly stood aside and let the attack commence, whereas the Berkeley police intervened to stop the bikers from assaulting the protesters. Six Hells Angels members were arrested and a Berkeley police sergeant suffered a broken leg in the brawl. The Angels maintained that the attack was done "in the interest of public safety and the protection of the good name of Oakland, California."

The incident led to a collection of students, left-wing political organizations, and labor unions led by Allen Ginsberg and Jerry Rubin meeting with motorcycle club representatives, headed by the president of the Sacramento Hells Angels chapter, in a cafeteria at San Jose State University. Ginsberg and Rubin sought assurance that a planned Vietnam Day Committee protest march in Oakland on November 20, 1965, would not be disturbed. Ginsberg invited Barger and the Oakland Hells Angels to a party where he provided the bikers with free alcohol, drugs, and sex in exchange for their guarantee that the rally would not be attacked. On November 19, 1965, five Hells Angels led by Barger held a press conference at their bail bondsman's office, announcing that the club would not attend the protest the following day as "Any physical encounter would only produce sympathy for this mob of traitors", according to Barger. He went on to read aloud a telegram sent to President Lyndon B. Johnson, stating: "I volunteer a group of loyal Americans for duty behind the line in Vietnam. We feel that a crack group of trained guerillas could demoralize the Viet Cong and advance the cause of freedom." President Johnson did not reply to the letter.

After the spate of publicity the Hells Angels received in 1965, Barger had the club's name copyrighted. The Hells Angels were incorporated as a nonprofit organization in 1966. Barger and the Hells Angels became associated with the counterculture phenomenon of the 1960s. Between 1966 and 1973, the majority of his legitimate personal income was derived from consulting various film projects. He acted as a technical advisor on a series of outlaw biker films beginning with Roger Corman's The Wild Angels (1966). Onscreen, Barger was identified but did not speak in Hells Angels on Wheels (1967) and was one of several members of the Angels who had speaking parts playing themselves in Hell's Angels '69 (1969); he appeared in several additional films. Barger features prominently in Hunter S. Thompson's book, Hell's Angels. He was unimpressed with Thompson, and said of the writer: "When he tried to act tough with us, no matter what happened, Hunter Thompson got scared. I ended up not liking him at all, a tall skinny, typical hillbilly from Kentucky. He was a total fake." Barger and the Hells Angels are also depicted in Tom Wolfe's The Electric Kool-Aid Acid Test (1968), during Ken Kesey's La Honda encampment. Using his fame, Barger opened a chapter in Omaha, Nebraska in 1966, which, besides the chapter in New Zealand, was the first Hells Angel chapter outside of California. In 1967, Barger opened a Hells Angel chapter in Lowell, Massachusetts, which was the first Hells Angel chapter on the East Coast.

During the "Summer of Love" in San Francisco in 1967, the Hells Angels began to sell PCP, which came to be known as "Dust of the Angels" or DOA for short. PCP came to be popular with the hippies during the "Summer of Love," owing to its ability to cause hallucinations, and the Angels came to dominate the market for PCP in the Bay Area. Barger later admitted that besides selling PCP, his chapter "used to move most of the LSD" in the San Francisco area. Selling PCP made the Hells Angels wealthy for the first time, and according to the Federal Bureau of Investigation (FBI) agent Tim McKinley, who often investigated Hells Angels-related cases, it was in 1967 that the Hells Angels become a major criminal organization in their own right. Prior to 1967, the Angels had been used as subcontractors for other criminal organizations who used them to distribute cocaine and marijuana. With PCP, the Angels created a vertical monopoly.

As PCP lost popularity, the Hells Angels switched to selling methamphetamine, a market that they have dominated ever since. Barger recruited Kenny Maxwell, a former chemist for the Royal Dutch Shell oil company, who taught the Hells Angels how to make methamphetamine. In 1967, Barger enlisted Clarence "Butch" Crouch, a biker from Shreveport, Louisiana, and utilized him to form a Hells Angels chapter in Cleveland. In December 1967, Barger visited Ohio to oversee the merger of two Cleveland motorcycle gangs to form a local Hells Angels chapter. Barger ordered Crouch to eliminate the city's remaining biker gangs in order to conquer the methamphetamine market in the Cleveland area.

For at least five years beginning in 1967, Barger and the Hells Angels surrendered hundreds of guns and hundreds of pounds of explosives, as well as the locations of caches of weapons and narcotics, to the Oakland Police Department in exchange for the release of jailed Hells Angels members and other considerations from authorities. Oakland and Berkeley suffered a spate of approximately 80 bombings in the late 1960s and early 1970s, and police made the arrangement with the Hells Angels in order to acquire black market weapons which could otherwise be used by "subversives" such as Black Panther Party and Weather Underground radicals. The Angels were dealing in weapons which were stolen from armories and gun stores, or smuggled from abroad. Oakland police sergeant Edward "Ted" Hilliard testified in 1972 that he accepted guns, dynamite, and grenades from Barger personally in return for deals on arrests during at least fifteen separate meetings, the most recent of which occurred in the spring of 1971. Hilliard also testified that Barger had offered "to deliver the bagged body of a leftist for every Angel released from jail", an offer Hilliard refused as it "was absolutely out of the question". Barger denied ever making such an offer. Hilliard insisted, however, that authorities had not permitted crimes committed by the Hells Angels.

The first internal murder of a Hells Angels member sanctioned by the club was allegedly carried out when Paul "German" Ingalls, a member of the Oakland chapter who had previously transferred from the Omaha charter, was found guilty of burglarizing Barger's valuable coin collection by a six-man kangaroo court at the home of a Hells Angel on February 1, 1968. Ingalls was forced to ingest a large quantity of barbiturates until he suffered a fatal overdose.

In the late 1960s, Barger began selling heroin and also developed an addiction to cocaine. He was described as being "totally crazed on cocaine" for a time. Barger was allegedly the main distributor of cocaine and heroin in the East Bay area. He was among 33 members of the Oakland chapter arrested on drug charges after police raided a bar and a duplex apartment in the city on August 30, 1968. $7,000 worth of heroin and $2,500 worth of other narcotics were confiscated, as were firearms — including an M16 rifle, two shotguns, and an M1 carbine – and a large cache of ammunition, knives, chains, and suspected stolen merchandise. On July 30, 1969, Barger opened up the first Hells Angel chapter in Europe with a chapter being founded in London, followed by another in Zürich in 1970. In 1969, he opened up Hells Angels chapters in New York, Salem and Rochester, giving the Angels a strong presence in the Northeast.

==== Altamont Free Concert ====
Barger was one of the Hells Angels present at the Rolling Stones' Altamont Free Concert on December 6, 1969, at which the bikers were reportedly given $500 of beer to provide security. Concert goers and musicians alike were subjected to violence from the Hells Angels, including Marty Balin of Jefferson Airplane, who was knocked unconscious, and audience member Meredith "Murdock" Hunter, who was stabbed to death. Barger admitted in his autobiography that the Hells Angels had "beat the fuck out of them" (the people attending the concert). One of the Hells Angels pointed a gun at Keith Richards when he wanted to leave the stage owing to the violence in front of him. Barger claimed to have been sitting on stage drinking beer when the violence was taking place. As a result of critical media attention given to the Hells Angels after the concert, Barger went on KSAN, a local Bay Area radio station, to justify the actions of the Hells Angels and to present their side of the story. He asserted that violence only started once the crowd began vandalizing the Angels' motorcycles.

Barger would later state that Hunter fired a shot that struck a Hells Angels member with what he described as "just a flesh wound." Barger maintained that the Rolling Stones were ultimately responsible for the violent events that took place at the concert, saying: "They agitated the crowd, had the stage built too low, and then used us to keep the whole thing boiling. They got exactly what they wanted – a dark scary atmosphere to play 'Sympathy for the Devil' ... Just because you sing well doesn't mean you can act like a bunch of assholes to your fans – and that's what they did that night at Altamont".

He blamed the Rolling Stones' extended delay before making an onstage appearance for worsening the hostility of the crowd, and said the Hells Angels refused to act as bodyguards for "a bunch of sissy, marble-mouthed prima donnas" when the band asked the bikers to escort them to the stage. He also claimed that he stuck a gun into Keith Richards' side, to force the Rolling Stones to keep on playing through the riot despite the band's misgivings. Barger took umbrage with what he felt was the Stones' refusal to take responsibility for the catastrophe and he said in the days after the concert: "... Mick Jagger, like, put it all on us. He used us for dupes".

Barger appears in the documentary film about the Altamont Free Concert, Gimme Shelter (1970). Reflecting on the Altamont concert, which has been referred to variously as "the end of the hippie dream" and "the day the Sixties died", Barger wrote in his autobiography: "All that shit about Altamont being the end of an era was a bunch of intellectual crap. The death of Aquarius. Bullshit, it was the end of nothing ... Altamont may have been some big catastrophe to the hippies, but it was just another Hells Angels event to me".

After Altamont, Barger sought to expand the Hells Angels and improve the club's image. Members who were of little value to the Hells Angels were drummed out, and intravenous drug use was banned by the club. Barger also stripped the Hells Angels' "colors" of offensive patches, such as Nazi regalia and various colored wings awarded to members as a reward for sexual adventures performed in the presence of other members. The club also hired public relations specialists and began participating in charity fund drives.

The dispute between the Hells Angels and the Rolling Stones was compounded when the band refused to compensate the Angels for $50,000 in legal fees accrued by the club in the trial of Alan Passaro, who was acquitted of Meredith Hunter's murder on the grounds of self-defense. In March 1983, Clarence Crouch, a founding member of the Hells Angels' Cleveland chapter, testified before the Senate Judiciary Committee that the club had an "open contract" on members of the Rolling Stones and had made two failed attempts on the life of Mick Jagger. Barger subsequently called a press conference to deny Crouch's testimony. He again refuted the claims of a murder contract on Jagger in an interview with the Phoenix New Times in 1992, saying: "I personally don't like the guy, but that doesn't mean I want him dead. There are seven [Hells Angels] chapters in England and he comes over here a lot. If there was a contract out on him, then he'd be dead. It's that simple, he wouldn't still be singing."

=== "Gangster era" ===
Barger referred to the 1970s as "a gangster era for" the Hells Angels, writing in his autobiography: "The other clubs tried to take our [reputation] from us. The Blacks and Latinos didn't like us. White people were scared of us. Hippies no longer dug us. Rednecks couldn't stand us either. Everybody hated us. We became isolated". During this period, Barger's main lieutenants were Sergey Walton, James "Jim-Jim" Brandes and Kenneth "K.O." Owen. A police report from April 1970 stated: "The subject [Barger] is influential with motorcycle clubs all across the nation. Barger has been unemployed for years and yet is seen with large amounts of money. The money may come from dues he collected from his own chapter and the franchise money he obtains from chapter charters he has sold in various states. It is known that all Hells Angels deal extensively in the narcotic trade".

On April 11, 1970, Barger was arrested on narcotics charges after Donald Howarth, a film studio property manager and 1967 Mr. America from Studio City, was apprehended while walking towards Barger's home with a suitcase containing 17 ounces of cocaine and 30 ounces of heroin, with an estimated retail worth of $350,000. Barger temporarily resigned as president of the Oakland chapter in June 1970 to fight the charges, but returned to the position within months after his successor, John "Johnny Angel" Palomar, was sentenced to a ten-year prison term for shooting a bartender. The drug charges against Barger were later dismissed. He was, however, sentenced to ninety days in jail after walking out of a court session. Howarth was convicted and sentenced to serve five years-to-life in prison.

On January 22, 1972, Barger and four other Hells Angels – Russell Beyea, Bobby "Durt" England, "Oakland" Gary Popkin and Bert Stefanson – were traveling through Redwood Regional Park in two cars, a Pontiac and a Cadillac, when they were pursued in a high-speed chase by park rangers, who suspected the occupants of the vehicles of poaching. The Pontiac struck a tree after its tires were shot out by pursuing park rangers, and England and Stefanson fled into the brush only to be apprehended later. Discovered in the trunk of the Pontiac were three club "prospects" – William Hood, Russell Huddleston and Danny Jarman. Hood and Jarman had been bound, gagged and beaten, while Huddleston had survived having his throat cut. Barger, Beyea and Popkin were arrested after the Cadillac was chased for four miles by converging police. Various objects were thrown from the Cadillac during the pursuit, including four handguns, a shotgun, surgical gloves, and a belt with an ammunition pouch and a silver buckle engraved with the caption: "Sonny Barger Jr., 1957–67 president, Hells Angels Oakland."

Barger and the others were charged with attempted murder, kidnapping, and assault with a deadly weapon. Hood and Jarman told police that the incident was merely an initiation hazing. Amidst claims by the Hells Angels' attorneys, Jack Berman and Herman Mintz, of insufficient evidence and an illegal search by arresting officers, all five defendants pleaded guilty to a lesser charge of unlawful imprisonment.

Along with fellow Hells Angels members Sergey Walton, Donald Duane "Whitey" Smith, and "Oakland" Gary Popkin, Barger was charged with the May 21, 1972 murder of Servio Winston Agero, a drug dealer from McAllen, Texas, who had traveled to Oakland with a consignment of narcotics for sale. The incident allegedly occurred following a dispute over an $80,000 cocaine deal. A prosecution witness, Richard Ivaldi, testified that he witnessed Barger shoot Agero dead as he slept at the home of an absent acquaintance, and that Barger subsequently ordered the others to set fire to the residence. According to Barger's chief attorney James Crew, Ivaldi himself was involved in the conspiracy to kill Agero and, knowing he was a prime suspect and fearing retaliation from the "Texas Mafia", he tried to shift the blame to the Hells Angels. Barger was also provided with an alibi from his girlfriend, Sharon Gruhlke, who claimed she was in bed with him at the time of the murder. The killing of Agero was one of five possibly linked murders committed in the area around that time. Three men – drug dealers Kelly Patrick Smith, Willard Thomas and Gary Kemp, an acquaintance of Ivaldi – were found shot to death in a house near San Leandro the day after Agero's murder, and the body of a woman, Karen S. Long, was discovered in the trunk of a car in Oakland on May 26, 1972. Ivaldi had led investigating detectives to the location of the automobile in which Long's corpse was found. John Joseph Devaney, Long's former husband, was also found dead in a car in Hayward on June 14, 1972, in an apparent suicide by carbon monoxide poisoning.

During the trial, Ted Hilliard, Barger's handler in the Oakland police, and Barger himself testified that he had been cooperating with police for over five years in return for deals on arrests, bail reductions and other considerations. Barger explained: "If we come into possession of guns and explosives, we don't like to keep them around. We turn them in hoping they – the police – will do something for us". He also admitted being a drug dealer under questioning from the prosecutor in the case, District Attorney Don Whyte. On December 29, 1972, Barger and his three co-defendants were acquitted following a seven-week trial after Ivaldi's credibility came under scrutiny.

In December 1972, police bypassed a six-foot fence and Doberman Pinscher guard dogs to raid Barger's home in the Oakland Hills, finding eight guns throughout the house and an unidentified human skull on a dresser. At Barger's trial for narcotics and weapons offenses in February 1973, the jury was read Barger's testimony from his 1972 murder trial in which he admitted to dealing drugs. On March 16, 1973, he was sentenced to a prison term of ten years-to-life after he was convicted of possession of narcotics for sale (37 grams of heroin), and possession of a weapon by a convicted felon. His future wife Sharon was a co-defendant; her case ended in a mistrial when a jury failed to reach a verdict. As a result of his imprisonment, Barger was forced to relinquish his presidency of the Oakland chapter for the first time since its inception. According to police intelligence reports, he had designated San Jose chapter president Fillmore Cross as his international successor during a motorcycle run at Bass Lake prior to his imprisonment. Cross was also imprisoned, for possession of amphetamines in 1975, and Barger allegedly continued to lead the Hells Angels from his cell at Folsom State Prison.

Hells Angels and members of other motorcycle gangs formed a clique in the California state prison system which acted somewhat autonomously from the Aryan Brotherhood, the dominant white prison gang in California. One prison official described the status of bikers in the prison system as: "They originally stay out of things. They provide a balance in the racial conflicts. When trouble starts with the Chicanos or the blacks, the Angels join up with the other whites". Barger befriended Mike "Acha" Ison, a leader in the Mexican Mafia, at Folsom.

Barger began studying sociology in prison. During his incarceration, a bikers' magazine ran a "Free Sonny Barger" campaign, selling T-shirts and bumper stickers, which helped pay his legal expenses. Barger gave a series of interviews, including one with Geraldo Rivera for his Good Night America television program, in which he portrayed himself as a model prisoner and said: "They got to let me out sometime." In April 1977, Barger won an appeal to face a retrial on a prior marijuana possession conviction.

His acquittal in that case made him eligible for parole as the California Supreme Court ruled that a five-year waiting period – attached to his sentence due to the prior marijuana conviction – was unconstitutional. He was paroled on November 3, 1977, after serving four-and-a-half years of his sentence. On December 5, 1977, Barger opened the first Hells Angels chapter in Canada in Montreal and awarded the Canadian Hells Angels national president Yves "Le Boss" Buteau the right to wear a Hells Angels jacket with the word "International" written on the bottom – a great honor within the world of the Hells Angels where jackets normally list only the state in which the Hells Angel lives in. On October 28, 1978, Barger opened the first Hells Angels chapter in the Netherlands with Willem van Boxtel serving as the president of the Amsterdam chapter. The Amsterdam chapter under Boxtel's leadership was to become the most powerful Hells Angel chapter in Europe.

Barger was arrested on a parole violation charge of possession of firearms when police officers discovered a 9 mm semiautomatic pistol, a .38 caliber revolver, and a rifle after arriving at his Oakland home on March 27, 1978, to serve a subpoena and to conduct a parole search. The case was dismissed when Barger's wife Sharon testified that the guns belonged to her, not her husband.

=== RICO trial ===
Barger and his wife were among 33 members and associates of the Hells Angels' Oakland, San Francisco, Marin County, San Jose, Los Angeles, and Vallejo chapters indicted on Racketeer Influenced and Corrupt Organizations Act (RICO) statutes on June 13, 1979. He and fifteen others were arrested during a series of raids carried out in the Bay Area by around 200 Drug Enforcement Administration (DEA) and Bureau of Alcohol, Tobacco, Firearms and Explosives (ATF) agents. The indictments followed two car bombings targeting law enforcement officers in Northern California, which were blamed on the Hells Angels. The bombings prompted the California Department of Justice to issue a warning to police departments that the Angels were engaged on a campaign to eliminate law enforcement personnel who investigated their drug activities.

The RICO case against the Hells Angels was the most substantial effort in federal history against the club at the time, and charged the defendants with various crimes dating back to 1971, including manufacturing and distributing methamphetamine; conspiring to commit murder; assault; use of false identification; intimidation; and bribery. Barger was held on a $1 million bail and spent 14 months in San Francisco County Jail before and during the trial. In a jailhouse interview with Cynthia Gorney of The Washington Post in October 1979, Barger stated: "I can tell you why they want to get rid of the Hells Angels, what I think. First of all we're a virtual army. We're all across the country, and now we're in foreign countries also. And they have no idea how many of us there are...We have money, many allies that are outlaw bikers that are not Hells Angels, that would probably do anything we asked them to, if something happened".

Barger and 17 of his co-defendants went on trial in the U.S. District Court for the Northern District of California at the San Francisco federal courthouse beginning on October 4, 1979. The prosecution team, representing the federal government, attempted to demonstrate a pattern of behavior to convict Barger and other members of the Hells Angels of racketeering offenses related to illegal weapons and drugs. According to U.S. Attorney William Hunter, the "cornerstone" of the Hells Angels' drug enterprise was the "large‐scale manufacture and mass distribution of methamphetamine". Prosecutors claimed that the Angels accumulated $160,000 per day in street sales of the drug. Tim McKinley of the FBI stated that the case against the Hells Angels had been poorly prepared as the prosecution had taken convictions for Barger and the other Hells Angel leaders for granted. McKinley told the Canadian journalists Julian Sher and William Marsden: "The problem was in the FBI we didn't have any idea who was in the Hells Angels. I thought 'this is weird': this may explain why we're not doing very well at the trial". The FBI had conducted no electronic surveillance of the Hells Angels and the prosecution had no corroboration of what its witnesses were testifying to at the trial.

The defense maintained that the club should not be held accountable for crimes committed by individual members. Barger himself admitted during the trial that he had used and sold narcotics in the 1960s, but asserted that his actions did not involve the Hells Angels. On July 2, 1980, following an eight-month trial in which 194 witnesses testified, a mistrial was declared when a jury failed to reach a verdict on counts against eighteen defendants. Of the remaining twelve, nine were convicted and three — including Sonny and Sharon Barger — were acquitted.

Over a two-year period starting in 1980, the Melbourne chapter of the Hells Angels led by Peter John Hill shipped three hundred liters of P2P (a chemical necessary to manufacture amphetamine) to the United States. Hill sent two cans of P2P per shipment, that provided enough P2P to make $50 million worth of amphetamine. Hill and the rest of the Melbourne charter received no share of the profits and were told that this was their contribution to helping Barger and the other Hells Angel leaders pay the legal fees related to the RICO case.

=== War against the Outlaws ===
The Hells Angels developed into a sophisticated and structured criminal organization largely as a result of Barger's leadership. He oversaw the club's expansion across the United States by establishing chapters in new territories, often by "patching over" existing biker gangs, in pursuit of controlling the drug trade nationwide. By 1978, the Hells Angels had branched out from their home state of California and had established additional U.S. chapters in Nebraska, Massachusetts, Ohio, New York, Connecticut, North Carolina and South Carolina to become the largest and most organized motorcycle gang in the country. The Hells Angels' aggressive expansion brought the club into conflict with the Outlaws, the dominant biker gang in the Midwest and the South, which held similar expansionist ambitions.

The feud between the Hells Angels and the Outlaws began in April 1974 when three members of the Hells Angels' Lowell chapter were abducted and shot execution-style in Fort Lauderdale on the orders of South Florida Outlaws leader James "Big Jim" Nolan as retribution for an Outlaw being beaten by Hells Angels at a New Year's Eve party in New York. During a summit of various chapter presidents held in Rochester in November 1978, the Hells Angels declared war on the Outlaws. Barger allegedly ordered Hells Angels across the country to kill any Outlaw they encounter on sight.

According to the FBI, the Hells Angels and the Outlaws were engaged in a conflict over control of the methamphetamine trade in the United States and Canada. Authorities accused the Angels of dominating the production of the drug in the U.S. Barger addressed such allegations by saying: "I'm sure there are some individual Angels who've sold methamphetamines. Just like I'm sure some cops have sold methamphetamines. I'm sure some of our members own guns, whether legal or not. And I'm sure the government makes a living off of us."

In the late 1970s, Barger and other senior Hells Angels ordered James "Buddy" Caronite, the president of the club's East Coast chapters, to organize a peace conference with Outlaws leaders. The supposed peace meeting, scheduled to be held in an eastern state, was in fact an opportunity for the Hells Angels to assassinate their rivals' leadership, according to investigators. Having given his word to the Outlaws that they would be safe at the meeting, Caronite – who characterised himself as a "man of honor" – reportedly warned away the Outlaws when he learned of the assassination plot. The warning angered the Angels hierarchy, and Caronite was demoted from his position as a national officer.

In October 1982, Barger was part of a large group of Hells Angels from across the country who attended the murder trial of Jack "Jack-O-Lantern" Gentry, a member of the club's Cleveland chapter accused of shooting Outlaws member Ralph "Real Time" Tanner behind the Outlaws' Toledo, Ohio clubhouse on November 30, 1980. Cleveland Hells Angel-turned-government witness Clarence Crouch testified for the prosecution that Gentry had murdered Tanner as part of an initiation process into the Hells Angels. The trial took place in Lucas County circuit court in Toledo, a city considered Outlaws territory. Barger and his Oakland contingent rented a house on Toledo's Sylvania Street, and the Angels showed a significant presence in the city throughout the court case.

Wearing their "colors", the bikers rode their motorcycles past the residence of assistant county prosecutor James Bates, visited the neighbors of jurors after obtaining a list of prospective jurors in the case, and circled the courthouse in black vans with "Hells Angels" painted on the side. A female juror was excused from duty after her son was threatened by a group of Hells Angels at a downtown Toledo bar that he would have "lots of problems" if his mother did not "vote the right way". When Gentry was acquitted after a four-day trial, Barger sent invitations to the jurors to attend a party he threw for Gentry at a local Sheraton Hotel. He denied that jurors were intimidated by the Hells Angels' presence at the trial, saying: "The only ones that are intimidated are the ones the feds tell to be".

Barger was diagnosed with throat cancer in 1983 and temporarily handed control of the club over to his second-in-command, Michael "Irish" O'Farrell, while he received and recovered from treatment.

=== Operation Cacus ===
In 1984, Anthony "Taterhead" Tait, the sergeant-at-arms of the Hells Angels chapter in Anchorage, Alaska, volunteered to become a paid informant for the FBI, commencing a three-year nationwide Organized Crime Drug Enforcement Task Force (OCDETF) investigation known as Operation Cacus. Traveling the country at government expense, Tait made documented purchases of firearms, explosives, and drugs from various Hells Angels chapters. He also covertly recorded club meetings by wearing a wire. During one such meeting, Barger admiringly told Tait that he represented the "Hells Angel of the '90s" – clean-cut, articulate, and capable of carrying out club business. Barger promoted Tait to sergeant-at-arms of all Hells Angels chapters on the West Coast, allowing the informant to reach a senior position in the club's national hierarchy.

In April 1986, Barger had a member of the Oakland chapter, Terry Dalton, expelled for stealing. On May 14, 1986, Barger had a photograph of Dalton issued to all Hells Angels chapters along a with note saying that Dalton was "fucking up" by socializing with the Hells Angels, especially with the members of the Vallejo chapter who were close to Dalton. In July 1986, Barger, who was angry that the Vallejo chapter were still friends with Dalton, invited them to the Oakland clubhouse where he had them all beaten. Tait, who was present during the beatings, wrote: "Several people gathered [Vallejo chapter president] Derrick Kualapi and took turns beating him". Tait described Barger as the man in charge of the beatings.

On August 12, 1986, John Cleave "J.C." Webb, a member of the Anchorage chapter, was shot and killed after an argument with two Outlaws, Leonard Wayne "Cool Ray" Mullen and Marshall Howell Duncan, outside a biker bar on Dixie Highway in Jefferson County, Kentucky, prompting Barger to say that it was "time to start killing Outlaws again". The Hells Angels began plotting to avenge Webb's killing by attacking members of the Outlaws chapter in Louisville, and Barger appointed Anthony Tait to lead the campaign. Barger sent a stolen copy of a government document prepared by the El Paso Intelligence Center (EPIC), which contained the identities and personal data of Outlaws members and associates, via express mail to Webb's sister in Louisville, Debbie Mansfield, who then turned it over to Hells Angels members from Anchorage. He also displayed another copy of the EPIC manual and explained how to use it to fellow Hells Angels at an Oakland chapter meeting on August 17, 1986. When another chapter member, Elliott "Cisco" Valderrama, suggested calling the Outlaws to inquire whether Webb's killing was an isolated incident, Barger replied: "Call them collect." He lent the EPIC manual to Tait for photocopying after Anchorage chapter president Edwin "Eddie" Hubert, who also expressed retaliatory sentiment after Webb's killing, instructed Tait to acquire a copy of the manual in September 1986.

When Tait informed Barger in a phone conversation that the FBI was investigating the package he had mailed to Webb's sister, Barger proposed the alibi that the package contained sympathy cards. Barger also circulated a photograph of the two Outlaws who killed Webb, firstly at an Oakland chapter meeting on November 30, 1986, and again at a summit of West Coast chapter officers on January 3, 1987. He and Tait discussed retaliation against the Outlaws on several occasions, and Tait encouraged Barger to travel to Alaska to provide guidance to the Anchorage Hells Angels chapter on retributive action. During a visit to Barger's house on January 17, 1987, Tait asked for advice about killing Outlaws, with Barger telling him: "It doesn't matter which one. You're not going to get the guys that did it [killed Webb]...You can snipe one of them...Don't get caught".

On September 18, 1987, two members, Kenneth "Kenny" Yates and Andrew Shission, and a "prospect", John Ray Bonds, of the Cleveland chapter were ambushed by Outlaws when they stopped in Joliet, Illinois to repair a defective motorcycle while en route to an East Coast officers meeting in Minneapolis. The three Hells Angels had their patches stolen, and chapter president Yates was shot in the foot. The incident gave rise to a second retaliation plot against the Outlaws in the Midwest headed by the Cleveland chapter. Shortly afterwards, Tait told Barger that he had been to Chicago and Milwaukee to carry out reconnaissance on Outlaws clubhouses there and that he would require an alibi if he was to carry out an attack, to which Barger responded: "That would be no problem." On October 18, 1987, Tait informed Barger of a fictitious plot to bomb the Outlaws' Chicago headquarters, which he purported would likely kill five or six people, and Barger replied: "That'll be really nice after that Joliet thing". When Tait mentioned: "There might be innocent people there", Barger answered: "That's what they get for hanging around with guys like that". Barger then made plans to provide an alibi for Tait. Between October 20 and 23, 1987, Michael O'Farrell periodically stayed in a Hyatt hotel room booked by Tait and drove Tait's rental car. Tait called Barger on November 9, 1987, and reported that he had accomplished his mission.

Operation Cacus concluded on November 10, 1987, when 38 Hells Angels members and associates in Alaska, California, Kentucky, North Carolina and South Carolina were arrested on various narcotics, weapons, explosives, and conspiracy charges. Barger was among thirteen people taken into custody in the Bay Area, where over 400 FBI, ATF, and California State Police personnel carried out 26 raids on homes and other properties, seizing more than 100 weapons, approximately $1 million in cash and drugs, and three methamphetamine laboratories. Two EPIC manuals and a homemade explosive device were discovered in Barger's home by federal agents. Tim McKinley of the FBI gave orders to the FBI agents who arrested Barger to place his handcuffed hands behind his back, which the agents ignored and placed his hands in front. McKinley joked to Sher and Marsden: "Good help is so hard to get". As Barger was being marched into the FBI's San Francisco office on November 10, 1987, Ted Baltas of the ATF approached Barger to take custody of him, Barger kicked him in the right knee and assaulted him. When McKinley came to Baltas's aid, he in turn assaulted him. Barger's last words to McKinley, a man he had hated, were: "Fuck you, McKinley, you're an asshole!" McKinley stated the trial was a desperate time for Barger as he stated: "When he gets scared and under pressure, he reverts to type. Cornered, trapped, he lashes out".

A Hyatt hotel room key and a handwritten note — deemed to have been written by Barger after evaluation by a handwriting expert — listing Anthony Tait's hotel room number and rental car license plate number were also found at Michael O'Farrell's residence. While most of the Hells Angels arrested in Northern California were charged with drug offenses, Barger and O'Farrell were accused of conspiring to violate federal firearms and explosives laws. U.S. Attorney General Edwin Meese stated that Barger's arrest had averted five murders. Barger was formally indicted on December 15, 1987, along with twenty others.

=== Conspiracy trial and imprisonment ===
Barger and nine other Hells Angels from California and Alaska were extradited to Kentucky to stand trial for conspiring to transport firearms and explosives across state lines. The ten defendants went on trial at Louisville federal court beginning in July 1988, accused of plotting to bomb Outlaws clubhouses in the Portland neighborhood of Louisville and elsewhere, in retaliation for the killing of John Cleave Webb. Around a hundred Hells Angels wearing full "colors" attended the trial, as did the country singer Johnny Paycheck, a friend of Barger. The U.S. Marshals Service provided security, and the assistant U.S. attorneys assigned to the case were deputized by the Marshals, allowing them to carry guns inside the courthouse.

The prosecution asserted that the Hells Angels were a highly organized criminal organization ruled by a "code of silence" involved in drug trafficking, shootings and bombings. Anthony Tait, the government's key witness in the case, was housed in a safehouse in the Louisville suburb of Prospect during the trial, where he was guarded by an FBI SWAT team. Barger was represented by defense attorney Stephen Miller, and Barger's wife worked on the defense team as a paralegal. The defense endeavored to expose the government's "outrageous" investigative conduct and discredit Tait, whom the government acknowledged was paid $300,000 in salary and expenses for the information he provided. Tait's estranged wife, Brenda Lee Fowler, gave evidence for the defense, calling her husband a "liar, a scum and a cheater" and alleging that he dealt drugs. Leonard Mullen, the Outlaws member convicted of killing Webb, testified that he shot Webb over a personal feud and that there was no war between the Outlaws and the Angels. He also attested that the FBI had asked him to fake his own death in order to further their investigation against the Hells Angels, to which he refused. The defendants shook hands with Mullen and thanked him for his testimony.

Under a special arrangement approved by U.S. District Judge Edward H. Johnstone, defense attorneys subpoenaed each of the codefendants as witnesses, entitling them to per diem witness fees. The total cost of the case was estimated at $1 million. Barger reportedly celebrated his 50th birthday in the midst of the trial by partying and smoking marijuana at the home of Thomas Clay, Michael O'Farrell's lawyer, in Goshen, Kentucky.

Following a three-month-trial, the longest ever in the history of the U.S. District Court for the Western District of Kentucky, Barger and O'Farrell were convicted on October 28, 1988, on the felony charge of conspiracy to transport and receive explosives in interstate commerce with intent to kill and damage buildings. Barger and three other defendants were also convicted on the misdemeanor charge of knowingly converting a copy of a government document, while five others were acquitted of all charges. He stated following his conviction: "I think we won very handily in there. It was just too bad that Irish [O’Farrell] and I were convicted, but we will probably win an appeal. I think it was a devastating blow to the government, and I couldn’t be happier with the verdict except if I had been found innocent myself."

On April 21, 1989, Barger was sentenced to 57 months' imprisonment at the Federal Correctional Institution, Phoenix, Arizona and fined $6,000. As inmate 82740–011, Barger came to be fond of Arizona as he later wrote: "I dig the desert; it's the new California. It's wide and free". At Christmas 1989, he sent one of the prosecutors in the case, assistant U.S. attorney Cleve Gambill, a card from prison, showing him posing on a towel as if he were on the beach, with the message: "Nice weather. Wish you were here." While imprisoned, Barger received dozens of requests for interviews every month but continuously turned them down as he was collaborating with a screenwriter at the time to have his life story turned into a film and was unwilling to compromise the commercial viability of the project. He also took up running for exercise in prison, saying: "I'm slow but I can go on forever".

Barger appealed his convictions, contending that the government's investigative conduct had deprived him of his Fifth Amendment right to due process, that he had been incited to commit crimes by Anthony Tait and the government, and that the district court erred when it sentenced him pursuant to the Sentencing Reform Act guidelines. He said of the government's case against him: "There never was a crime thought up by the Hells Angels. It was thought up by the FBI. It was paid for by the FBI. And I went to jail for it. That's the way it goes."

On January 23, 1991, the U.S. Court of Appeals for the Sixth Circuit upheld Barger's convictions, stating that granting him amnesty "would greatly intrude into the law enforcement functions of the executive branches of federal and state governments". The Appeals Court agreed with the government's position that its conduct was necessary due to the Hells Angels' violent history, and rejected Barger's argument that the government had committed entrapment because it deemed the conspiracy to have been originated by the Hells Angels themselves. Furthermore, the Appeals Court ruled that the district court did not act in error to sentence Barger under the federal guidelines.

=== Biker war resurgence ===
Barger was released from prison on November 6, 1992, after serving three-and-a-half years of a four-year sentence. On the day of his release, Barger took a flight to Oakland International Airport and attended a homecoming party at the Mountain House, a bar at Altamont Pass in Livermore, at which Johnny Paycheck performed. To celebrate the end of his parole, he held another private party in Livermore on November 6, 1994, which was attended by approximately 700 guests, including the politicians Gary Condit and Ben Nighthorse Campbell. Colorado state senator Nighthorse Campbell had allegedly tried to use his influence to have Barger released from prison earlier.

The conflict between the Hells Angels and the Outlaws saw a resurgence following Barger's release from prison as a result of his longstanding rivalry with Outlaws president Harry "Taco" Bowman. Philip Reich of the Detroit Police Department motorcycle gang unit described the feud as "an ongoing thing over who had the better club", saying: "It was like the Hatfields and McCoys. They hated each other." In an attempt to quell the increasing tensions between the clubs, Ventura Hells Angels chapter president George "Gus" Christie twice attended peace talks with Bowman in Florida, firstly in December 1992 and again in May 1993. The proposed peace treaty ultimately broke down, however, when Bowman suddenly withdrew from the negotiations on the advice of one of his lieutenants, Kevin "Spike" O'Neill, who thought agreeing to a ceasefire would make the Outlaws appear weak. In August 1993, in Paris, leaders of the Hells Angels and the Bandidos signed the "Pact of Paris" that divided up much of Europe between the two clubs.

Hostilities between the Hells Angels and the Outlaws increased significantly when the Angels recruited the Hell's Henchmen, a biker gang operating in the Outlaws' territory in the Chicago area. The Hell's Henchmen resisted the Outlaws' attempts to forcibly amalgamate the gang and began "prospecting" for the Hells Angels instead in 1993 before "patching over" to become the Angels' chapters in Chicago, Rockford and South Bend in 1994. The Hells Angels' expansion into Illinois and Indiana, and the Outlaws' attempts to prevent the Angels from infiltrating their territory, resulted in a number of shootings and bombings in the Midwest.

At the same time, Barger handled the outbreak of the Great Nordic Biker War in Scandinavia. In early 1994, Barger summoned Thomas Möller, the president of the Hells Angels Malmö chapter, to remind him that the "Pact of Paris" was a non-aggression pact. A summit was held between the leaders of the Hells Angels Oakland chapter and the Bandidos Houston chapter where it was agreed that the Bandidos would abide by the "Pact of Paris", which had assigned Sweden to the Hells Angels. The attempts to avert a biker war in Scandinavia failed largely because the Danish Bandido leader Jim Tinndahn kept trying to expand the Bandidos into Sweden contrary to the "Pact of Paris", and the American leaders of the Bandidos were unable to control Tinndahn.

Harry Bowman allegedly placed a $100,000 bounty on Barger's life. In early 1995, Bowman sent a team of Outlaws members to California to carry out surveillance ahead of the assassination of either Barger or George Christie. The plot was thwarted when three members of an Outlaws hit squad were arrested in Ventura after federal agents intercepted details of a planned assassination of Christie on a wiretap. The turf war between the Outlaws and the Hells Angels ended in the spring of 1995 due to Outlaws leaders' concerns about heightened surveillance on the club by federal authorities which resulted from the biker violence in the Midwest.

In 1997, the government of Denmark contemplated banning all outlaw biker clubs in response to the Great Nordic Biker War. To forestall this possibility, Barger attended the peace talks in Seattle representing the Hells Angels along with Thomas Möller, who was in charge of all the Hells Angels in Europe. The Bandidos were represented by their international vice president George Wegers, Charles "Jaws" Johnson of their Houston chapter and Jim Tinndahn of the Helsingborg chapter. The meetings ended with the American leaders imposing a truce on their Scandinavian chapters as neither the Bandidos nor the Hells Angels wanted to see a biker ban. The Canadian journalist Yves Lavigne wrote that Barger's ability to impose a truce on the Scandinavian branches of the Hells Angels showed that his power over all of the Hells Angels chapters around the world was real, not nominal, and it was significant that he only took action in response to the possibility of a ban on outlaw biker clubs.

=== Move to Arizona ===
On October 18, 1997, the five-chapter strong Dirty Dozen biker gang of Arizona "patched over" to become Hells Angels chapters. Barger was keen to establish Hells Angel chapters in Arizona and courted the Dirty Dozen (which despite its name number had 120 members) for five years prior to the "patch-over". Barger cut the period of time serving as "prospects" for the Hells Angels by half. The Dirty Dozen were described by ATF agent Joe Slatalla as the "largest and most violent gang in the state". The Dirty Dozen had beaten off attempts by the Mongols, the Vagos and the Devil's Disciples to establish chapters in Arizona. Barger praised the Dirty Dozen as "friends and allies". The Angels' amalgamation of the Dirty Dozen was promulgated during a meeting in Oakland. Barger transferred over from the Oakland chapter to the newly formed Cave Creek charter in October 1998. In 1999, Lavigne wrote: "The Hells Angels obviously have big plans for Arizona. Sonny Barger would not pull up roots, after forty years in the Bay Area, on a whim. Talks of his retirement are premature. His move to Arizona will allow Hells Angels Ventura chapter president George "Gus" Christie to take over the political reins of the gang, but Barger will help legitimize the gang in the business world from the dry desert state. The Hells Angels Motorcycle Club is Sonny Barger's life. He will retire only when he dies. He has nothing else to live for".

Barger's role within the Arizona Hells Angels was reportedly an advisory position, as he did not hold officer status and he rarely attended rallies or public events. He founded a motorcycle repair company in Arizona named the Big Red Machine, a reference to a popular nickname for the Hells Angels. Barger was later a member of the Yavapai County chapter. Sher and Marsden wrote that by 2002, Barger was a "figurehead, relinquishing day-to-day decisions to many of his underlings".

In 1998, peace talks were opened to end the long-standing biker war with the Outlaws, which was largely because the conflict was bringing down too much police pressure on both clubs. Mel Chancey, the president of the Hells Angels Chicago chapter who served as their lead negotiator, met with Barger in the spring of 1998 to discuss the negotiating terms. The talks began on July 18, 1998, in the Copacabana strip club in the Illinois town of Alsip with Edward "Shock" Anastas, the president of the Outlaws Milwaukee chapter, serving as their lead negotiator. Under the terms that Chancey and Anastas struck, the status quo was preserved as the Hells Angels recognized Chicago as within the territory of the Outlaws in exchange for being allowed to keep their chapters in the Chicago suburbs. The agreement also applied to Canada, with the Outlaws agreeing to provide no assistance to the Rock Machine in the Quebec Biker War in return for peace with the Hells Angels in the United States. Barger attended the last negotiating session with the Outlaws between January 23 and 25, 1999 in Indianapolis, where in a joint press conference with Anastas it was warned that any Outlaw or Hells Angel who violated the peace agreement "would be dealt with".

In 2000, Barger became a bestselling author with his autobiography, Hell's Angel: The Life and Times of Sonny Barger and the Hells Angels Motorcycle Club, co-written with Keith and Kent Zimmerman. In his autobiography, he divided the history of the Hells Angels into four eras, namely the First Era (1950s and 1960s) characterized by drug use and sex, the Second Era (1970s) characterized by organized crime, the Third Era (1980s) which he depicts as a period of persecution by the U.S. government, and the Fourth Era (1990s), which he characterized as a return to the original values of the club in the 1950s and 1960s. He subsequently wrote several biker-related novels. Barger's 21st century books represented a change of image as Sher and Marsden noted that his earlier writings in the 20th century had "gloried in self-congratulatory tales of rapes and murders" while his later books presented himself as a more family friendly character. A reviewer in the Los Angeles Times on April 21, 2002, called Barger the writer of "romantic tales of hell and heck raising". In later years, Barger worked to promote motorcycle safety: he co-authored a book on the subject with Darwin Holmstrom (the author of The Complete Idiot's Guide to Motorcycles (1998)) titled Let's Ride: Sonny Barger's Guide to Motorcycling (2010).

In terms of pure workmanship, personally I don't like Harleys. I ride them because I'm in the club, and that's the image, but if I could I would seriously consider riding a Honda ST1100 or a BMW. We really missed the boat not switching over to the Japanese models when they began building bigger bikes. I'll usually say "Fuck Harley-Davidson." – Ralph "Sonny" Barger, Hell's Angel

In August 2000, Barger visited the United Kingdom to promote his book despite advice from the police for the Home Office to deny him a travel visa under the grounds that he had a criminal record. Barger was allowed entry under the grounds he was no longer a threat to public order. He drew large crowds for his British book signing tour. The media reaction was largely favorable. The Daily Telegraph called him "a legend". The Times wrote that Barger was "affable, big-hearted, warm". The Independent stated that Barger was an "American legend".

Barger was present at the Hellraiser Ball, a tattoo and motorcycle trade exposition in Plainview, New York, sponsored by the Long Island chapter of the Hells Angels which was ambushed by dozens of members of the rival Pagans motorcycle gang on February 23, 2002, resulting in one biker being killed and at least ten injured. A Hells Angels member was charged with second-degree murder and seventy-three Pagan members were indicted on federal racketeering charges in the aftermath of the incident. Increasing tensions between the Hells Angels and other motorcycle clubs led to Barger organizing a peace conference scheduled to be held in the Arizona desert, following the April 2002 Laughlin River Run motorcycle rally in Laughlin, Nevada. The meeting was canceled as a result of the River Run riot, a confrontation between members of the Hells Angels and the Mongols at the rally which ended with three deaths. About the Laughlin River Run riot, which put the Hells Angels and the Mongols on the front page of The New York Times, Barger stated: "Publicity has always been good for the Angels".

On July 14, 2002, Barger called the police to say that he had beaten his wife, Beth Noel Barger, so badly that she is "paralyzed and cannot move". Barger stated he and his wife were fighting over a "slut" as Beth called his mistress. Barger in his 911 call said: "She tried to pull a gun on me and I kicked her and she says she can't move". Barger then changed his story when the police arrived and said that his wife was merely going for a gun hidden in their car when he kicked her. Beth Noel Barger stated that Barger had attacked her while she was sitting in a patio chair and denied going for a gun. A doctor's report revealed that Beth had suffered a broken rib, a broken back and a lacerated spleen. Beth also stated "Sonny had beaten her before, but she never reported it". On March 6, 2003, Beth Noel Barger called the police to accuse Barger of beating her up along with her 13-year-old daughter, Sarah, by a previous marriage. One of the sheriff's deputies in his notes of the incident wrote: "Sonny Barger admitted to me that he did physically grab his wife by the arms and possibly by the throat". While Noel was being treated for her injuries at the hospital that night, she told the FBI agent Stephen Smith that Barger had a STAR 9mm semi-automatic handgun at his ranch, which would be a violation of Arizona law, which forbade felons from owning guns. Noel also claimed to have been paid $1,000 to become a "confidential informant" for the FBI, but gave conflicting and confusing statements to the FBI. A gun matching the description provided by Noel was found on the Barger ranch, but it remain unclear who was the owner of the gun. On March 11, 2003, a hearing was held to decide if there was enough evidence to go to trial. However, there was no evidence beyond the statements of Noel that the gun belonged to Barger. Barger's lawyer, Brian Russo, during his cross-examination of the FBI agents, established the FBI had never dusted the gun for Barger's fingerprints. When the judge asked the prosecutor if he knew the reason why the gun had never been dusted, he received the reply: "I do not. Anything sounds like an excuse". The judge dismissed the case under the grounds there was "no reliable and credible evidence" that the gun belonged to Barger.

Jay Dobyns, an agent for the ATF, met Barger in Arizona while he was serving undercover in 2003. Dobyns told Sher and Marsden: "He's the shot caller, the deal broker. His reputation precedes him, so when people talk to him they know who they're talking to. Without a doubt you know that he's the Guy. He's very personable, he's charming. You can see how he developed this club. He's a politician. He's a salesman". Dobyns stated: "He's not a big guy, not a physically threatening guy. But he's got this charismatic leadership personality that allowed him to build this club. When you talk to him, when you speak to him, he makes you feel that there is nothing going in his life except that conversation with you. He makes you feel important, like he is personally interested in you". Many of the younger Hells Angels resented Barger for the way he became a rich man by selling his books and paraphernalia. Dobyns stated that Barger was unpopular as the feeling within the Hells Angels were: "All he's concerned with is promoting himself, his books, his movies, his products". Papers filed in court after Barger's wife, Noel Barger, filed for divorce on April 4, 2003, revealed that Barger made $330,328 in royalties from the sale of his autobiography in 2001, $340,843 in 2002, and $230,541 in 2003. Barger also received $150,000 from the Twentieth Century Fox studio which purchased the film rights for his autobiography. One police officer stated that the Hells Angel leaders in California disliked the way that Barger refused to step aside as he said: "You can't be the heir apparent if Sonny continues to keep calling the shots and running things. Sonny didn't leave and people are still in battle with that". A number of other Hells Angel leaders such as George Christie, the powerful president of the Ventura chapter, were described by Sher and Marsden as "rivals" who were waiting for Barger to die.

On March 22, 2003, Daniel "Hoover" Seybert, the president of the Hells Angels Cave Creek chapter to which Barger belonged to, was murdered. At the time, Barger told the media: "I'm just going to miss him. He put the club before anything else in his life". When Barger learned of Operation Black Biscuit, as the ATF operation against the Arizona Hells Angels had been code-named, after the arrests of July 8, 2003, he accused the police of killing Seybert as he maintained that Seybert was hostile towards Dobyns. Barger seldom appeared in public for several years following Seybert's murder without Louie Valdez, the sergeant-at-arms of the Cave Creek chapter, accompanying him as a bodyguard.

=== Later years ===
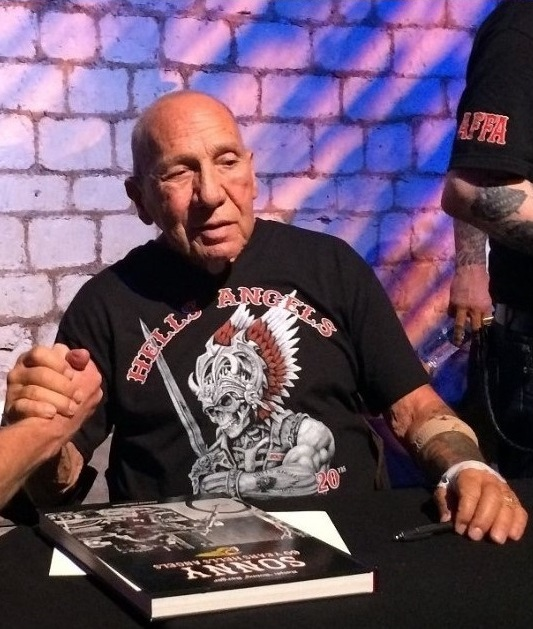
Barger in 2019

Together with his lawyer, Fritz Clapp, Barger owned and managed Sonny Barger Productions, a media firm designed to promote his image. Clapp told Sher and Marsden in 2005: "When we were in Europe, he was greeted like the pope. Limos at the airports, anything we wanted. It was a great time". When Sher and Marsden in an interview asked Barger about his involvement in the Angels–Outlaws biker war, the Great Nordic Biker War and the Quebec Biker War, he replied: "I didn't know anything about the biker wars. I have never been involved in one, and therefore I cannot talk about it". Marsden and Sher described Barger as a deeply dishonest man as they noted he had been convicted of conspiracy to murder members of the Outlaws in 1988, which in their view counted as involvement in a biker war. Marsden and Sher described Barger as a man who wanted to promote his image as an "outlaw", and was clearly uncomfortable about their questions about crimes involving the Hells Angels.

On November 30, 2010, Barger made a guest appearance as Lenny "The Pimp" Janowitz on the season 3 finale of the FX television series Sons of Anarchy, about a fictional outlaw motorcycle club, allegedly based on the Hells Angels. Show creator Kurt Sutter spent time with Barger and other members of Hells Angels researching for the show, and acted opposite Barger in his scene. Barger returned on November 29, 2011, in the season 4 finale, part one. Barger's third guest appearance on Sons of Anarchy was during season 5, episode 10, which aired on November 13, 2012. One novel written by Barger, Dead in 5 Heartbeats, was made into an independent film in 2013, which Barger and his fourth wife, Zorana, produced and appeared in bit part roles. The film was promoted as having been rejected from the Sundance Film Festival and every other film festival it was submitted to. A biopic of Barger's life was also in development for several years, with the director Tony Scott attached to the project at one point.

Barger left Arizona in October 2016, returning to the Oakland chapter. He remained a popular figure both in the United States and abroad. In May 2017, when Barger visited Paris to promote a French translation of his autobiography, he attracted huge crowds of fans to the Paris clubhouse of the Hells Angels for the book-signing. The Norwegian anthropologist Tereza Østbø Kuldova described Barger as a man who had turned himself into a brand, having become a global icon who symbolized a very ruggedly tough, macho definition of American masculinity, which explained the large crowds of Parisians who wanted him to autograph copies of his autobiography.

On May 3, 2018, Barger testified in the racketeering trial of former Bandidos national president Jeffrey Fay Pike and former vice president Xavier John Portillo after being called as a defense witness by lawyers for Pike. Unable to travel to the trial in San Antonio for medical reasons, Barger testified via video link from the federal courthouse in San Francisco, denying that the Hells Angels and the Bandidos were enemies. Barger's testimony challenged earlier assertions by government witnesses who testified that Anthony Benesh, a motorcyclist who was shot dead in Austin on March 18, 2006, after attempting to establish a Hells Angels chapter in the city, was killed by Bandidos members because he had ignored the club's warnings to not set up a HAMC chapter in Texas.

Barger kept a low profile in his final years, although his 81st birthday — the numbers 8 and 1 are used by the Hells Angels to refer to their corresponding letters of the alphabet, H and A — was celebrated in a major event hosted at the Oakland chapter clubhouse in October 2019.

== Personal life ==
Barger's first wife Elsie Mae (née George) died on February 1, 1967, from an embolism in her bloodstream after undergoing an illegal abortion. In 1969, he began a relationship with Sharon Gruhlke, a former beauty queen from Livermore. Barger married Gruhlke while he was incarcerated at Folsom State Prison in 1973. The marriage ended in divorce.

In 1982, Barger was diagnosed with throat cancer after years of heavy smoking. He reportedly smoked three packs of Camel cigarettes per day for thirty years. His diagnosis and treatment took place at Fort Miley VA Hospital in San Francisco. Having stage III laryngeal cancer, he underwent a total laryngectomy with bilateral functional neck dissections. Consequently, due to his vocal cords being removed, Barger learned to vocalize using the muscles in his esophagus. He subsequently wore a full-face motorcycle helmet to protect the hole in his throat when riding. Barger later publicly advocated against smoking, saying: "Want to be a rebel? Don't smoke as the rest of the world".

In 1998, Barger moved to Arizona for health reasons, with his third wife Beth Noel (née Black) and stepdaughter Sarrah. He joined the Hells Angels' Cave Creek chapter, and operated a motorcycle repair shop. On March 7, 2003, Barger was arrested by Maricopa County Sheriff's Office deputies after a reported domestic dispute with his wife and stepdaughter at their home in New River, Arizona. Noel suffered a broken rib and back, and a lacerated spleen. Barger was sentenced to an eight-day jail term for aggravated assault. He and Noel later divorced.

Barger married his fourth wife, Zorana (née Katzakian), on June 25, 2005, and remained married to her until his death in 2022. He had no biological children.

In 2010, Barger was diagnosed with prostate cancer. He underwent surgery in 2012. His prostate was removed and he was subsequently declared free of cancer.

== Death ==
On June 29, 2022, Barger died of liver cancer aged 83 at his home in Livermore, California. His death was announced in a Facebook post reading:

If you are reading this message, you'll know that I'm gone. I've asked that this note be posted immediately after my passing.

I've lived a long and good life filled with adventure. And I've had the privilege to be part of an amazing club. Although I've had a public persona for decades, I've mostly enjoyed special time with my club brothers, my family, and close friends. Please know that I passed peacefully after a brief battle with cancer. But also know that in the end, I was surrounded by what really matters: My wife, Zorana, as well as my loved ones. Keep your head up high, stay loyal, remain free, and always value honor.

Sonny

HAMCO

In July 2022, the Hells Angels made a request to hold a memorial service for Barger at the Oakland Coliseum in East Oakland the following month. Instead, Barger's funeral was held at a motorsports racetrack in Stockton on September 24, 2022. An estimated 7,000 people attended, and the event was peaceful. Fox News host Tucker Carlson spoke at the funeral. Carlson said that he had been a fan of Barger since his college years, quoted Barger as saying "stay loyal, remain free, and always value honor", and added: "I want to pay tribute to the man who spoke those words". Barger was laid to rest at Sacramento Valley National Cemetery in Dixon.

== Selected works ==
- With Keith Zimmerman (2001). Hell's Angel: The Life and Times of Sonny Barger and the Hell's Angels Motorcycle Club. William Morrow. ISBN 0-06-093754-8.
- Ridin' High, Livin' Free: Hell-Raising Motorcycle Stories. William Morrow. 2003. ISBN 0-06-000603-X.
- Dead in 5 Heartbeats. HarperTorch. 2004. ISBN 978-0-06-053253-6.
- Freedom: Credos from the Road. William Morrow. 2005. ISBN 0-06-053256-4.
- 6 Chambers, 1 Bullet. William Morrow. 2006. ISBN 978-0-06-074531-8.
- Let's Ride: Sonny Barger's Guide to Motorcycling. William Morrow. 2010. ISBN 978-0-06-196427-5.

== Filmography ==
- Hells Angels on Wheels (1967)
- Hell's Angels '69 (1969)
- Gimme Shelter (1970)
- Hell's Angels Forever (1983), featuring Sonny Barger, Jerry Garcia, Scott Barnes, Johnny Paycheck, Willie Nelson
- Sons of Anarchy television series, (2010–2012), played recurring character Lenny "The Pimp" Janowitz
- Dead in 5 Heartbeats (2012)
