= Michael O'Farrell (biker) =

American outlaw biker and gangster (1949–1989)

- O'Farrell in 1984
- Born: Michael Vincent O'Farrell; June 2, 1949; Los Angeles County, California, U.S.
- Died: June 6, 1989 (aged 40); San Leandro, California, U.S.
- Cause of death: Gunshot and stab wounds
- Resting place: Evergreen Cemetery
- Other name: "Irish"
- Occupations: Outlaw biker, gangster
- Known for: President of the Oakland Hells Angels chapter
- Allegiance: Night Riders MC; Hells Angels MC
- Convictions: Conspiracy to transport and receive explosives in interstate commerce with intent to kill and damage buildings

Michael Vincent O'Farrell (June 2, 1949 – June 6, 1989), nicknamed "Irish", was an American outlaw biker and gangster who served as the vice-president and acting president of the Oakland, California, chapter of the Hells Angels Motorcycle Club (HAMC). O'Farrell was alleged by law enforcement officials to be the second-in-command to Sonny Barger, the reputed international president of the Hells Angels. During the early-mid 1980s, he deputized for Barger, serving as the Oakland chapter president and de facto international leader of the Hells Angels, while Barger recovered from a throat operation for cancer. O'Farrell was murdered in a bar fight in 1989 shortly before he was due to start serving a prison sentence for conspiring to bomb the clubhouse of a rival motorcycle gang, the Outlaws.

== Hells Angels ==
While a member of the Night Riders motorcycle gang in Glendale, O'Farrell, along with members of the San Bernardino chapter of the Hells Angels, the Glendale Mongols chapter and the Straight Satans of Venice, committed a sexual assault on a fifteen year-old girl in August 1972. He was among eleven biker gang members convicted in Los Angeles of rape and sex perversion on April 5, 1973. Aside from being a registered sex offender, O'Farrell also had convictions for robbery, grand theft, burglary and assault.

The Night Riders were issued a Hells Angels charter by the club's San Bernardino faction and "patched over" to become the Angels' Los Angeles County (LACO) chapter. The Hells Angels recruited the Night Riders to bolster their ranks during a war with the Vagos. While incarcerated at San Quentin State Prison during the late 1970s, O'Farrell requested a transfer to the Oakland Hells Angels chapter. This request was denied by LACO chapter president George Christie because the Hells Angels' bylaws state that members may not transfer from one charter to another while imprisoned. O'Farrell ultimately transferred to the Oakland chapter following his release from custody. Christie described O'Farrell in his book Exile on Front Street: My Life as a Hells Angel as "a tough-as-nails outlaw, ruggedly handsome with long, thick brown hair and sad, soulful eyes that made him a favorite with women. He was fast with his fists and a legendary fighter, which made him a favorite among [Hells Angels] members".

On March 27, 1978, O'Farrell was arrested for parole violations along with Sonny Barger, Russell Beyea and James "Jim Jim" Brandes when 42 Hells Angels members and associates were served with subpoenas requiring them to appear before a grand jury investigating the club's activities in Solano County.

Known for his prowess as a street fighter, O'Farrell is alleged to have beaten New York City Hells Angels chapter sergeant-at-arms Vincent "Big Vinny" Gerolamo while Gerolamo was visiting O'Farrell's Oakland chapter in 1979. Upon returning to the East Coast, Gerolamo reported to New York chapter president Sandy Alexander that he had in fact been beaten by not just O'Farrell, but by several members of the Oakland chapter, prompting Alexander to travel to California to make inquiries. Alexander, a former professional boxer, reportedly returned to New York satisfied that O'Farrell was indeed solely responsible for Gerolamo's beating after a fight with O'Farrell at the Oakland chapter clubhouse. Gerolamo died weeks later, on September 12, 1979, of complications from a ruptured spleen, believed to have been sustained in the beating.

While Oakland Hells Angels president Sonny Barger was recovering from an operation for throat cancer in the early-mid 1980s, O'Farrell served as acting president of the chapter beginning in 1983. As Oakland is the location of club's unofficial "mother chapter", he was additionally the de facto leader of the Hells Angels internationally. During his tenure as president, O'Farrell denied to the Los Angeles Times in 1983 that the Hells Angels were involved in organized crime, and called Operation Roughrider, a nationwide Federal Bureau of Investigation (FBI) investigation that resulted in the arrests of 133 Hells Angels members and associates in May 1985, "an ongoing conspiracy by the government". O'Farrell continued as the Oakland chapter's vice-president after Barger returned as president.

On November 10, 1987, O'Farrell and Barger were among thirteen Hells Angels arrested on narcotics, weapons, explosives and conspiracy charges during a series of raids carried out by the FBI, Bureau of Alcohol, Tobacco, Firearms and Explosives (ATF) and California State Police personnel in the San Francisco Bay Area, which also resulted in the seizure of over a hundred weapons, more than $1 million in cash and drugs, and three methamphetamine laboratories. The operation in the Bay Area was executed in synchronization with raids on various other HAMC chapters in four other states – producing a total of thirty-eight arrests – and concluded a two-year FBI investigation of the club, which commenced in 1985 after Anthony Tait, an officer in the Anchorage, Alaska Hells Angels chapter, volunteered to become a paid informant. Travelling the country at government expense, Tait made documented purchases of weapons, explosives and drugs from the Hells Angels. He also covertly recorded club meetings by wearing a wire. O'Farrell, Barger and eight other Hells Angels from California and Alaska were extradited to Louisville, Kentucky, to face trial for conspiring to transport firearms and explosives across state lines in order to kill members of the Outlaws Motorcycle Club in retaliation for the death of John Cleave Webb, the Anchorage HAMC chapter president who was shot and killed by two Outlaws members outside a biker bar in Jefferson County, Kentucky, on August 12, 1986. O'Farrell and Barger were convicted of conspiracy on October 28, 1988. While awaiting sentencing, the pair attended the funeral of San Bernardino Hells Angels chapter sergeant-at-arms Aristeo Andres "Art" Carbajal, which was held in Bloomington on February 21, 1989. Carbajal had been stabbed to death in a fight with the Mongols at a motorcycle trade show in Long Beach on February 11, 1989. On March 10, 1989, O'Farrell was sentenced to three and a half years in prison.

== Murder ==
Two weeks before he was due to report to United States Penitentiary, Atlanta to begin serving his sentence, O'Farrell was drinking at the Halfway Club in San Leandro, California, on June 6, 1989, when he was recognized by a member of the Aryan Brotherhood as the man who had attempted to collect a drug debt from him two months prior. Fearing he would be beaten by O'Farrell again, the Brotherhood member ambushed O'Farrell outside the bar, stabbing him five times in the back, once in the chest and once in the neck, before shooting him four times from behind with a .25 caliber pistol while he was dying. He then shot another Hells Angel, Michael Musick, who fled after being wounded in the shoulder. Powdered methamphetamine was found on the bar's patio, where the killing occurred. Police stated that O'Farrell may have been killed as a result of a power struggle between the Hells Angels and the Aryan Brotherhood in the East Bay. According to the prosecutor Cleve Gambill, O'Farrell was murdered as part of the killer's initiation into the Aryan Brotherhood. O'Farrell was laid to rest at Evergreen Cemetery after approximately a thousand people, including his wife Teddy and son, attended his funeral in East Oakland on June 11, 1989.

Two Aryan Brotherhood members charged in connection with O'Farrell's death, Aaron "Jerry" Marsh and Michael Bruce "Tank" Shepherd, were arrested in the following weeks. Marsh – who was accused of firing several shots during the fight, including one that wounded Musick – was taken into custody in Manteca on June 27, 1989, and Shepherd – who was charged with the homicide of O'Farrell – was apprehended by San Bernardino County Sheriff's Department deputies and California Highway Patrol troopers on Route 60 on July 26, 1989, after a high-speed chase through Chino and Ontario. Shepherd allegedly admitted his guilt in the killing to his lawyer Steven Gore. Marsh was strangled to death in Pelican Bay State Prison on July 25, 1997, by cellmate Gary J. Littrell after refusing an order from the Aryan Brotherhood leadership to murder another inmate. Shepherd committed suicide by hanging himself in his cell at Santa Ana Central Jail in December 2004 shortly after pleading guilty in a RICO case.

== Bibliography ==
- Christie, George (2016). Exile on Front Street: My Life as a Hells Angel. New York City: Thomas Dunne Books. ISBN 9780283072666.
- Lavigne, Yves (1996). Hell's Angels: Into the Abyss. New York City: HarperCollins. ISBN 9780006385707.
