= Operation One Percenter =

1985 federal investigation into outlaw motorcycle gangs

- Operation Name: Operation One Percenter
- Type: Organized crime investigation

Roster
- Planned by: United States Department of Justice; Bureau of Alcohol, Tobacco, Firearms and Explosives

Mission
- Target: Outlaw motorcycle gang members and associates
- Objective: To arrest and prosecute outlaw bikers violating federal firearms, explosives and narcotics laws

Timeline
- Date begin: 1985
- Date end: 1986
- Date executed: 1985–1986

Results
- Suspects: ≈100
- Arrests: 68+

Accounting

Operation One Percenter was a nationwide federal investigation into organized crime activity by outlaw motorcycle gangs conducted by the United States Bureau of Alcohol, Tobacco, Firearms and Explosives (ATF). The investigation resulted in the arrests of 68 members and associates of 18 different biker gangs in 18 U.S. states.

== Background ==
Amidst growing membership and increasingly sophisticated criminal activity, federal law enforcement agencies within the United States Department of Justice began classifying outlaw motorcycle gangs as "non-traditional organized crime" beginning in 1981, identifying four of the gangs—the Hells Angels, the Outlaws, the Pagan's and the Bandidos—as the largest and most powerful. According to federal law enforcement, biker gangs dominated the trade of manufactured drugs such as methamphetamine and PCP, and were also involved in contract killing, extortion, prostitution, firearms trafficking, car theft and witness intimidation, often in collusion with traditional organized crime families. At the time, there were an estimated 600 to 800 motorcycle gangs in the U.S.

== The investigation ==
Operation One Percenter consisted of a series of Bureau of Alcohol, Tobacco, Firearms and Explosives (ATF) investigations against members and associates of outlaw motorcycle gangs across the United States, some involving the use of undercover operatives. The name of the operation stemmed from an estimation by the American Motorcycle Association (AMA) that only 1% of motorcyclists are "outlaws". Eighteen different gangs including the "big four"—the Hells Angels, the Outlaws, the Pagan's and the Bandidos—were targeted. The other, smaller gangs included the Devil's Disciples, the Vagos, the Ghost-riders, the Dirty Dozen, the Vermin, the Devils Diciples, the Nomads, the Iron Riders, the Diablos, the Phantoms, the Sons of Silence, the Chosen Few, the Rum Pot Rustlers, and the Trampers. Operation One Percenter lasted 12 months and involved 100 ATF agents as well as assistance from 30 state and local police agencies. The investigation was the largest ever undertaken against outlaw motorcycle gangs at the time.

The investigation targeted around 100 gang members. Beginning on March 5, 1986, the ATF arrested fifteen suspects who were traveling around the country and may have known they faced charges. On March 27, 1986, a further 53 motorcycle gang members and associates were arrested in an eighteen-state dragnet, on various charges including violations of federal firearms and explosives laws, conspiracy and drug trafficking. Among those arrested were six chapter presidents. Raids were carried out in California, Idaho, Nevada, Arizona, New Mexico, Texas, Minnesota, Louisiana, Alabama, Tennessee, Indiana, Georgia, Michigan, Maryland, New York, Vermont, Massachusetts and New Hampshire. Operation One Percenter also resulted in the seizure of 10 sawed-off shotguns, 10 machine guns, 63 rifles, 100 handguns, 4,500 rounds of ammunition, six silencers, a bomb, four hand grenades, five pounds of dynamite, 15 stolen vehicles, a stolen computer and a methamphetamine lab, as well as large quantities of cocaine, marijuana and PCP. A further 50 suspects were expected to be rounded up in the following weeks.

== Prosecutions ==
The six motorcycle gang chapter presidents arrested in Operation One Percenter were James Atkins (Bandidos, Texarkana, Arkansas); Francis Attardo (Trampers, Boston, Massachusetts); Christopher Curvin (Nomads, Mansfield, Massachusetts); Patrick Matter (Hells Angels, Minneapolis, Minnesota); Ronald Neal (Devils Diciples, Birmingham, Alabama); and Charles Simpson (Outlaws, Nashville, Tennessee).

Matter pleaded guilty on May 15, 1986, to possession of a firearm by a convicted felon as part of a plea agreement under which he would be sentenced to no more than two years in prison. On June 25, 1986, Simpson pleaded guilty to possession of a silencer and two pistols under the agreement that he would face three years in a federal prison and three years on probation.
