= Anthony Tait =

American informer

- Born: Anthony John Tait; May 27, 1954 (age 72); Anchorage, Alaska, U.S.
- Other names: "Tony T"; Tony Truth"; "Tony Uno"
- Occupations: Soldier; bouncer; paid informant
- Known for: FBI informant within the Hells Angels
- Allegiance: Hells Angels MC

Anthony John Tait (born May 27, 1954) is an American man who served as an informer for the Federal Bureau of Investigation (FBI) within the Hells Angels. Tait has been described as the "most damaging informant in the history of the Hell's Angels" whose testimony led to the conviction of the Hells Angels leader Sonny Barger on charges of conspiracy to commit murder.

== Early life ==
Tait's father, Samuel Gordon Tait, was a Scotsman who served as an intelligence officer in the British Army during World War II and was later posted to Haifa during the British occupation of Mandatory Palestine. The Tait family immigrated to Alaska in 1960. Tait enlisted in the United States Army on June 15, 1971. After receiving an "undesirable discharge" from the army in March 1974, Tait began working as a bouncer and doorman at a number of bars in downtown Anchorage.

== Informer ==
Tait was born and grew up in Anchorage, Alaska. Tait worked as a bouncer in a series of strip clubs in Anchorage and became friends with members of the Anchorage chapter of the Hells Angels while also working as a part-time informer for the Anchorage Police Department. On a dare with two policemen, Tait joined the Anchorage chapter in 1983. He rose up to become the sergeant-at-arms. The Anchorage police had little experience with running informers and passed Tait onto the FBI.

== Operation Cacus ==
Tim McKinley, the FBI agent who had been the anti-Hells Angels specialist in the bureau told the Canadian journalists Julian Sher and William Marsden in a 2006 interview: "What he wanted to do was just give us a bunch of information and we do wiretaps, and everybody would go to jail. He was kind of shocked to find out just how complicated it was". McKinley used Tait as "a walking electronics platform" to record everything that the Hells Angels said and did. McKinley stated: "What he was tasked to do was to identify the upper-level leadership of the Hells Angels, identify the criminal structure of the organization, track the money, track the dope". McKinley wanted Tait to provide the evidence to convict Sonny Barger, whom he described as a wily and formidable opponent. McKinley said of Barger: "Balls—the guy certainly has balls".

McKinley formed a partnership with Ted Baltas of the Bureau of Alcohol, Tobacco, Firearms and Explosives to handle the case. Both Baltas and McKinley stated that past efforts against Barger had failed because of bureaucratic infighting between different branches of the U.S. government. Baltas said: "In the early days, each agency wanted to control its own investigation—the DEA doing drugs, the FBI doing their things, the AFT guns and bombs. The whole idea of collaborating and sharing wasn't there. We didn't have the resources, the knowledge, the manpower—or we weren't smart enough to do it". The partnership between Baltas and McKinley surprised many in the U.S. government as Baltas stated: "The fact that the ATF and the FBI worked together so closely left a lot of people speechless". Past investigations into the Hells Angels had also failed because of corruption within the U.S. government as McKinley stated officials of the government routinely sold information to the Angels. McKinley stated that the way the Hells Angels knew far too much about FBI investigations and were always able to take measures to avoid being arrested could only be explained by corruption. McKinley used as example how in the early 1980s the Hells Angels always moved their methamphetamine labs once the FBI put them under surveillance, which he argued could only be explained by corruption within the FBI. To prevent more corruption, the team handling Tait was kept very small with eight FBI and two ATF agents handling him. Tait only used pagers and pay phones to communicate with his handlers. The operation was codenamed Cacus, after the centaur in the Inferno who rules the Circle of Hell reserved for the souls of thieves. McKinley had wanted to name the operation Charon after the boatman of Greek mythology who carried the souls of the dead across the river Styx to symbolize his intention to send away the Hells Angels forever, but found that the name Charon had been used for a prior operation. McKinley praised Tait as an informer as he stated: "He's got an ego the size of Montana, but he is perfectly willing to follow instructions and report accurately".

Tait's swagger, aggression and apparent success as a drug dealer allowed him to become the Hells Angels point man for the entire West Coast. He met Barger numerous times. Barger later wrote: "Judging by the way he threw money around, I figured he dealt drugs or something". Tait usually wore two wires for his meetings in case the batteries failed on one of his wires, and also had a bug in his pager. Tait visited nearly every Hells Angels chapter in the world. Tait was paid $4,000 per month by the FBI.

On 12 August 1986, a Hells Angel, John Webb, was murdered by 2 members of the Outlaws Motorcycle Club in Louisville, Kentucky. Barger appointed Tait to lead the campaign against the Outlaws in Kentucky, which nearly derailed Operation Cacus. McKinley complained the appointment was "the four-hundred pound gorilla that just ripped our ass". Under American law, informers may not commit murders and their handlers may not permit a murder to occur, and Tait's assignment in Kentucky presented major problems for his handlers. On 17 August 1986, Tait attended a meeting of the Oakland chapter where Barger discussed the "identification numbers" and home addresses of a number of Outlaw leaders. Barger also had much information from the El Paso Information Center (EPIC) that was meant to serve as an information bank for American law enforcement. The way that Barger had a secret book about the Outlaws from the EPIC meant only for police officers alarmed Tait's handlers as it showed the extent of police corruption was far deeper than previously thought. As Barger handed around the files, one Hells Angel chapter president was recorded as saying to Tait: "The book would be useful in setting out targets".

On 29 September 1986, Tait visited Barger at his house in Oakland. Barger showed Tait the names and photographs of various Outlaw leaders from the EPIC book. According to a FBI affidavit: "Barger told Tait how to retaliate against members of the Outlaws motorcycle club by murdering them one at a time". On 30 November 1986, Tait attended a meeting of the Oakland clubhouse where the Hells Angels spoke about their defense fund that existed to hire lawyers for those Angels facing criminal charges. Barger was recorded as saying that he tried to know as little as possible about the uses of the defense fund and said: "There was a judge back east that got convicted of accepting some of that". He made a gesture that resembled handing money under the table as he made that remark. Barger was apparently referring to a case in Cleveland where a judge had been bribed to throw a case that ended with the acquittal of a Hells Angel on trial for murder. On 17 January 1987, at a visit to Barger house, Tait asked for advice about killing Outlaws. Barger told him: "It doesn't matter which one. You're not going to get the guys that did it...You can snipe one of them...Don't get caught".

In September 1987, three Hells Angels were beaten up by the Outlaws in Joliet, Illinois who stole their bikers vests with their Hells Angels patches, a humiliation that enraged Barger. On 18 October 1987, Tait was to again visit Barger's house and was notably nervous before the meeting. Tait drank heavily to steel his nerves by having several shots of whiskey. At the meeting, Tait spoke explicitly to Barger about plans to kill several Outlaw leaders in the Midwest and received his approval. Tait showed Barger his plans to bomb the Outlaws clubhouse in Chicago, which he predicated would "kill five or six people". Barger replied: "Good. Especially after Joliet". Tait stated: "There might be innocent people there". Barger answered him: "That's what they get for hanging around with guys like that".

== Witness for the prosecution ==
Tait was paid a total of $300,000 by the FBI for his work. On the basis of the evidence provided by Tait, Barger was arrested for conspiracy to commit murder on 10 November 1987. At the trial, Tait testified for six weeks as the star witness for the U.S. government. Tait's ex-wife, Brenda Lee Fowler, testified for the defense. She testified that Tait was "a liar, a scumbag and a cheater" who engaged in substance abuse, beat her, and talked to the ashes of his dead father. The trial ended with Barger being convicted of conspiracy to commit murder, for which he served 59 months in prison. Over a series of trials in the late 1980s and early 1990s, more than 500 people were convicted on the basis of the evidence collected by Tait, making him in terms of convictions registered the most effective informer for the U.S. government in history. Tait now lives in self-imposed exile somewhere in Europe under an assumed name.

== Books ==
- Barker, Thomas (2007). Biker Gangs and Organized Crime. Lexington: University of Kentucky. ISBN 9781437755077.
- Lavigne, Yves (1996). Hell's Angels: Into the Abyss. Toronto: Harper. ISBN 0061011045.
- Sher, Julian; Marsden, William (2006). Angels of Death: Inside the Bikers' Empire of Crime. Toronto: Alfred Knopf Canada. ISBN 9780307370327.
