= Devils Diciples Motorcycle Club =

American outlaw motorcycle club

Devil's Disciples MC
- Abbreviation: DDMC
- Founded: 1967
- Founded at: Fontana, California, U.S.
- Type: Outlaw motorcycle club
- Region served: USA

The Devils Diciples Motorcycle Club (DDMC) is an outlaw motorcycle club that was founded in Fontana, California in 1967. Such clubs are not sanctioned by the American Motorcyclist Association (AMA) and do not adhere to the AMA's rules. The club originally had six members. There is a misconception that the word "disciples" was intentionally misspelled to distance themselves from any type of religion. However, in the early days of the club, some founding members went to Mexico to have their patches made, and the misspelling was unintentional, but stuck. Their insignia is a motorcycle wheel with two tridents crossing over it. In the United States, the club has chapters in Alabama, Arizona, California, Idaho, Illinois, Indiana, Michigan, Mississippi, Missouri, Nevada, and Ohio.

== Controversies ==
The Devils Diciples are considered by law enforcement to be among the many second-tier, after the "Big Four", outlaw motorcycle clubs.

Ronald Douglas Neal, the president of the Birmingham, Alabama Devils Diciples chapter, and Jacquelyn O'Dusky, a Diciples associate, were indicted on firearms and narcotics charges after the Bureau of Alcohol, Tobacco, Firearms and Explosives (ATF) and the Jefferson County Sheriff's Department raided Neal's home as part of Operation One Percenter, a 12-month ATF investigation, and a 15-month investigation by local investigators. The pair handed themselves into authorities on March 19, 1986. On March 27, 1986, another Devils Diciples member, John E.Bondy, was arrested in Tucson, Arizona on a five-count indictment accusing him of making false statements in acquiring firearms, and unlawfully receiving and possessing firearms as a convicted felon, also as part of Operation One Percenter. The ATF operation resulted in the arrests of 53 members and associates of 18 different biker gangs on various weapons and narcotics charges, during a series of raids in 18 U.S. states, and the seizure of 10 sawed-off shotguns, 10 machine guns, 63 rifles, 100 handguns, 4,500 rounds of ammunition, six silencers, a bomb, four hand grenades, five pounds of dynamite, 15 stolen vehicles, a stolen computer and a drug lab, as well as large quantities of cocaine, marijuana and PCP.

In November 2006, the U.S. District Court in Detroit closed its first major methamphetamine case with the sentencing of two Devils Diciples members and five associates in connection to manufacturing methamphetamine.

In an investigation into the club begun in 2002, prosecutors in 2009 requested dropping the last remaining charges against the club's national president, Jeff "Fat Dog" Garvin Smith, "...to avoid compromising an ongoing investigation and because the interests of justice require it." Charges against 17 other club members or associates had been dropped in April. These charges included drug trafficking and other offenses, brought when 18 alleged members of the Devils Diciples were arrested on April 2, 2009 by the Federal Bureau of Investigation. During the raid, 42 firearms, 3,000 rounds of ammunition, three bullet-proof vests, $12,000, 15 casino-style slot machines, 1,000 Vicodin and OxyContin pills, 1½ pounds of methamphetamine and 55 pounds of marijuana were seized. The remaining charges Smith was to be tried for were being "...a violent felon in possession of body armor..." as well as "...using a communications facility (a telephone) in furtherance of drug trafficking..."

New Baltimore, Michigan District Court Judge Paul Cassidy was investigated in April 2009 for allegedly giving Devils Diciples members preferential treatment. He is a boyhood friend of their National President Jeff Garvin Smith. Cassidy announced his retirement after his home and office were searched as part of the investigation of the Devils Diciples.

In 2011, Stephen J. Kinzey, a kinesiology professor at California State University, San Bernardino, was accused of smuggling methamphetamine while part of the club. Per San Bernardino Superior Court records, Kinzey's charges have been dismissed.

Duane "Dog" Chapman, now an anti-crime celebrity bounty hunter, was associated with the club during his adolescence.

July 2012, 31 Devils Diciples members in Michigan and Alabama were arrested by the FBI. More than 60 firearms and more than 6,000 rounds of ammunition were seized during this investigation. In addition, eight methamphetamine manufacturing laboratories were dismantled. Smith and five other members were convicted in Federal court in 2015 of various offenses. As of July 2015, sentencing had been delayed until 2016. in November 2018 Smith was convicted and sentenced to life in prison.23
