= Outlaws MC criminal allegations and incidents =

Criminal incidents involving the Outlaws Motorcycle Club

Outlaws MC
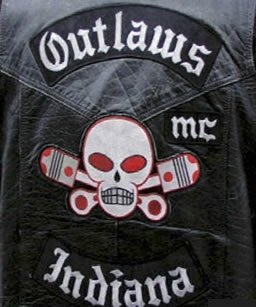
- Outlaws colors
- Founded: 1935; 91 years ago
- Founding location: McCook, Illinois, United States
- Years active: 1935–present
- Territory: 416 chapters in 42 countries
- Membership (est.): 3,000+
- Activities: Drug trafficking, arms trafficking, prostitution, money laundering, bombings, auto theft, intimidation, insurance fraud, kidnapping, robbery, theft, stolen property, counterfeiting, contraband smuggling, murder, extortion, arson, and assault
- Allies: Aryan Nations; Bandidos MC; Black Pistons MC; Breed MC; Buffalo crime family; Chicago Outfit; Detroit Partnership; Grim Reapers MC; Gypsy Joker MC; Hammerskins; New Orleans crime family; Pittsburgh crime family; Rock Machine MC
- Rivals: Devils Diciples MC; Diablos MC; El Forastero MC; Galloping Goose MC; Hells Angels MC; Highwaymen MC; Iron Horsemen MC; Loners MC; Mongols MC; Pagans MC; Red Devils MC; Sons of Silence MC; Warlocks MC
- Notable members: Harry Bowman; Garnet McEwen; Jim Nolan; Mario Parente

The Outlaws Motorcycle Club, also known as the American Outlaws Association, or A.O.A., is classified as a motorcycle gang by various law enforcement agencies internationally. The Outlaws have been implicated in various organized crime activities, including drug trafficking, extortion, money laundering, prostitution rings, weapons trafficking, and violent acts directed at rival motorcycle clubs. Members of the Outlaws have continuously denied that the club is an organized crime syndicate, asserted that the organization is simply a group of motorcycle enthusiasts who live a nonconventional lifestyle, and described allegations by investigators and prosecutors as exaggerated.

== Belgium ==
The Outlaws are considered a criminal motorcycle gang by the Belgian Federal Police. The club's first chapter in Belgium was formed in Mechelen on 5 March 1999.

In April 2000, "full-patch" member Jan Wouters was killed by Outlaw André Renard in the presence of two other Outlaws on the club's domain in Mechelen. All three members were given life sentences for the murder of their fellow Outlaw. Among them was the brother-in-law of the victim. According to the three convicted Outlaws, the murder took place after an argument escalated. Upon escalation, Wouters supposedly aimed a gun at his brother-in-law after which he himself was killed. It was largely believed that the murder was not the result of an escalated discussion, but rather an execution approved by the club's hierarchy.

On 4 October 2009, several Hells Angels and allied Red Devils performed a raid on an Outlaws clubhouse in Kortrijk. Shots were fired and three Outlaws were wounded before the Hells Angels and their Red Devils comrades fled the scene. The incident occurred after members of the Outlaws supposedly pushed over a motorcycle belonging to Red Devils president Johan F. in Moeskroen. The raid is also thought to be a part of a territorial dispute between the Hells Angels and the Red Devils on one side and the Outlaws on the other. Several months before the raid, on the 24 July 2009, members of the Red Devils and Hells Angels already retaliated by setting fire to motorcycles outside an Outlaws clubhouse. Eventually, six Hells Angels and two Red Devils were convicted for attempted murder and given sentences from five to twenty years in prison.

On 21 May 2011, one "full-patch" member, one prospect, and one supporter of the Belgium Outlaws were shot and killed by rival bikers of the Belgian Hells Angels. The killings took place in Eisden, not far from Maasmechelen where the Outlaws had opened a new clubhouse just several days earlier. Two days after the murders, several Hells Angels were linked to the murder and arrested, including the president of the Zwartberg chapter. The funeral of the "full-patch" member, Freddy Put, was joined by some 200 Outlaws from across Europe. The investigation concerning the murders in Eisden is ongoing and is made difficult because within both the Hells Angels and the Outlaws there is a code of silence. In a response to these murders, the Belgian Army is investigating the possibility of removing members of criminal motorcycle clubs from their ranks since two of the primary suspects were paracommandos.

On the night of 24 December 2012, during a rock concert in Dilsen-Stokkem, members of the Hells Angels were attacked by members of the Outlaws. Several Hells Angels were inside the Nieuwenborgh hall listening to the evening's last rock band finishing their final songs when, at about 1:30 a.m. by local time, several Outlaws armed with expandable batons (illegal in Belgium) arrived at the scene. The situation quickly escalated into a brawl with three wounded as a result. The police quickly arrived at the scene in large numbers. One of the wounded was a 41-year-old man who suffered an open fracture to the leg.

== Canada ==
The Outlaws entered Canada on 1 July 1977 when a number of Satan's Choice chapters under the leadership of Garnet "Mother" McEwen "patched over" to join the Outlaws. In Canada, the Outlaws claim seven chapters and a membership of approximately 60.

=== Newfoundland and Labrador ===
The Outlaws' two chapters in Newfoundland and Labrador are based in Grand Falls-Windsor and Gander.

=== Ontario ===
The Outlaws remained the largest club in Ontario until 2000. The club has four chapters in the province; in Toronto, Ottawa, South Simcoe and Sault Ste. Marie.

In 1981, Satan's Choice made an alliance with the Lobos and the Chosen Few gangs against the Outlaws. On 17 July 1983, a bus carrying two Hells Angels was shot up in Wawa by a group of Outlaws led by Mario "Mike the Wop" Parente. On 17 September 1983, an Outlaw, David Eugene Séquin, went on a shooting rampage when he stormed into the clubhouse of the Chosen Few in Emeryville. Séquin killed three people and wounded three more. One of those he killed was the national president of the Chosen Few, Edward Bruce Morris. In 1984, the Outlaws entered Toronto when their national president, Stanley "Beamer" McConnery, persuaded the Iron Hawgs gang to "patch over" to the Outlaws. In July 1985, Séquin, who had fled to the United States, was killed in a shoot-out with the police in Steger, Illinois, when he chose to resist arrest.

Kingston Outlaws chapter president William "Wild Bill" Hulko died of natural causes at Quinte Detention Centre in Napanee on 12 August 2002 while awaiting trial on charges of sexually assaulted a girl under the age of 14 in 1992, and with using a weapon during the assault. Hulko's funeral was held in Sault Ste. Marie on 18 August 2002 and conducted entirely by members of the Outlaws and their support club, the Black Pistons.

On 25 September 2002, the Outlaws were the subject of Project Retire by the Ontario Provincial Police (OPP) that saw 56 Outlaws arrested. On 15 April 2007, Marcus Cornelisse was questioned by the police about whatever he violated his bail conditions, leading him to attack and beat two police officers. Corelisse was arrested the next day. Cornelisse made a plea bargain with the Crown that he would serve a year in prison for assaulting the two police officers in exchange for which he was forbidden to associate with other Outlaws. William Mellow, the Outlaw national secretary, was found to have on his farm a loaded 10-mm handgun, 50 rounds of ammunition, a 12-gauge shotgun and $11,065 in cash hidden in his Cadillac. In exchange for a plea bargain, Mellow pleaded guilty to having a handgun without a license in exchange for which he accepted he was not to associate with other Outlaws. With the exceptions of the Outlaw national president, Mario Parente, and Luis Fereiria, all of the Outlaws arrested in Project Retire made plea bargains, which crippled the Outlaws.

Recently, the Outlaws have clashed with the Loners in at least one incident in Cornwall. The Loners relocated their chapter from Cornwall to Brockville around 2020 following an aggressive investigation into its alleged drug trafficking. On 8 July 2023, members of the Loners and Outlaws were involved in an altercation in Cornwall which police believe was targeted. One person was shot and two people stabbed, but their injuries were not considered life-threatening. Five people were arrested and charged, with details yet to be released. Less than 36 hours later, the Outlaw clubhouse in Brockville was destroyed by a large fire. The fire was deemed suspicious because of the building's ownership and the presence of accelerants in the building. Police are not yet linking the two events. A series of raids in Southwestern Ontario earlier in the month saw police seize a large quantity of drugs as well as weapons, including two sniper rifles. Police stated the results of the raid showed that the Outlaws and other MCs were expanding into smaller communities and that they are able and willing to use deadly force.

=== Quebec ===
On 15 February 1978, two Outlaws were shot outside of a Montreal bar, sparking a biker war with the Hells Angels that lasted until 1984.

== Finland ==
The Outlaws entered Finland via Russia, when a feeder club called Fifteen MC South Karelia was established in Lappeenranta in 2012 with support from a Russian Outlaws chapter. The number 15 in the feeder club's name referred to the fifteenth letter of the alphabet, "O", standing for Outlaws. In 2012, the Fifteen MC clubhouse in Lappeenranta was destroyed in an arson attack; the perpetrators were never identified. In the summer of 2017, two Finnish groups in Jyväskylä and Lappeenranta received prospect status, and in September 2018, both were accepted as full-member chapters—Midland (Jyväskylä) and South-Karelia (Lappeenranta)—alongside a Lithuanian chapter in Kaunas. A third chapter, Frontline, subsequently formed in the Jyväskylä area with a clubhouse in Muurame, and a fourth chapter, West Coast, has also been established.

=== 2023–2024 drug trafficking case ===
Between August and December 2023, members of the Outlaws' Frontline chapter in Jyväskylä and their associates distributed tens of kilograms of drugs in Central Finland and the Helsinki capital region. The investigation involved suspects from Finland, the United Kingdom, Sweden, Estonia, the United States, and Hungary. Thirteen people were arrested, of whom seven remained in custody at the conclusion of the pre-trial investigation.

The group operated hierarchically. Frontline chapter president Marko Tapio Puttonen held a commanding position over other members. British national Lee Patrick Smyth served as an international liaison and drug administrator, travelling from the United Kingdom to Finland on multiple occasions. Smyth first arrived in Finland on 7 August 2023 and met Puttonen in Jyväskylä, after which Puttonen sent a WhatsApp message to other Outlaws members stating: "Manchester guests received." The group secured a rental apartment in the Pupuhuhta neighborhood of Jyväskylä as a base of operations and drug storage facility.

On 16 October 2023, a Cessna 210 Centurion light aircraft (registration HA-SKA) landed at Hyvinkää airfield, approximately 60 kilometers north of Helsinki, carrying 20 kilograms of cocaine. The single-engine propeller aircraft departed from Hungary and made a refueling stop in Lithuania before arriving in Finland. Three Hungarian nationals arrived on the aircraft. Hyvinkää airfield is an uncontrolled general aviation airfield with no air traffic control or permanent government oversight. Police had no prior intelligence of the cocaine shipment; it was only discovered later during the investigation of other suspects in the case.

Of the cocaine shipment, 10 kilograms were delivered to Swedish national Abbas Abdulaziz Mohammad, who was arrested on 18 October 2023, while 5 kilograms were transported to Jyväskylä. Police suspected an additional 5 kilograms remained unrecovered. The cocaine packages bore a Mercedes-Benz logo stamp, and a Hungarian fingerprint was found on one of the packages.

The Hungarian nationals departed Finland on 18 October 2023. Police later learned that the same individuals were arrested in Ireland on 1 December 2023 with approximately 60 kilograms of heroin in their possession, using the same Cessna 210 aircraft. Irish authorities arrested Aradi Ignac and Zoltan Nemeth, a former Soviet-trained fighter pilot, at Weston Airport in Dublin. The heroin was concealed in the tail section of the aircraft in 120 packages of approximately 500 grams each, with an estimated street value of €8.4 million. In November 2024, Ignac was sentenced to ten years' and Nemeth to eight years' imprisonment by the Dublin Circuit Criminal Court.

In December 2023, police seized 76.65 kilograms of amphetamine from an apartment in the Pupuhuhta neighborhood of Jyväskylä—the largest single drug seizure in the history of Central Finland. The amphetamine was packed in red moving crates on the apartment's balcony, with packages bearing Sonic the Hedgehog and Peppa Pig logos. An additional 5.04 kilograms of cocaine marked with Mercedes-Benz logos was recovered from the same location. In total, the investigation yielded seizures of approximately 77 kilograms of amphetamine, 15 kilograms of cocaine, 7 kilograms of marijuana, and €190,150 in cash.

On 11 July 2024, the Helsinki District Court convicted nine individuals in the case:

Defendant	Sentence	Charges
Marko Tapio Puttonen	13 years	2 counts of aggravated narcotics offence, narcotics use offence, firearms offence
Lee Patrick Smyth	12 years	2 counts of aggravated narcotics offence
Jaanus Sengbusch	10 years 2 months	2 counts of aggravated narcotics offence, narcotics offence (incl. prior suspended sentence)
Kalle Heikki Jalmari Tikka	10 years	2 counts of aggravated narcotics offence, narcotics offence
Abbas Abdulaziz Mohammad	5 years	Aggravated narcotics offence
James Shipley	4 years	Aggravated narcotics offence
Ari-Pekka Utriainen	3 years 8 months	Aggravated narcotics offence, narcotics use offence
Roland Kovacs	3 years	Aggravated money laundering
Kevin Kumbi Benkono	1 year 4 months	Aggravated narcotics offence

The court ruled that the Outlaws MC met all the criteria of an organized criminal group under Finnish law, stating that it would be "completely implausible that a club in Finland could bear the name in question while being an entirely different kind of group." The crimes were found to have been committed as part of the activities of an organized criminal group, which was taken into account as an aggravating factor in sentencing.

== United Kingdom ==
The Outlaws expanded into the United Kingdom in February 2000 after amalgamating the Midland Outlaws, an independent club which had been in existence since 1992. The club has approximately 150 members and fourteen chapters in the England and Wales, and is primarily based around the Warwickshire, Staffordshire, South Wales, Derbyshire, Birmingham and London areas. The British faction of the Outlaws took over the club's European presidency in early 2007.

=== England ===
On 20 October 1996, Outlaws member Anthony Stephens and a group of friends were damaging cars parked outside The Plough pub in Coventry when they were asked to leave the premises by the pub DJ. Stephens shot the man in the face and subsequently fled to Ireland but was arrested when he arrived at Birmingham Airport in November 2013. In April 2016, he was sentenced to three years in prison after being convicted of causing of grievous bodily harm at Warwick Crown Court.

=== Wales ===
The first Welsh Outlaws chapter was formed in 1993 following a "patch over" of the Henchmen MC, which was founded in North Wales in 1969. The West Wales chapter originated in as the Strays MC in 1979. The South Wales chapter is the most recent.

The Outlaws came under investigation after Dyfed–Powys Police informed North Wales Police of drugs exchanges between members of the club's North Wales chapter and representatives of the West Wales chapter. Two Outlaws were found in possession of two kilograms of amphetamine when police searched their vehicle in Betws-y-Coed on 14 August 2008. Mobile phones seized from the two were examined and a pattern emerged of regular calls between Outlaws European president Stuart Ian "Dink" Dawson, West Wales chapter president Michael Barnes and another club member, Michael Byrne. In September 2009, police discovered cocaine after raiding the Outlaws' clubhouse in Colwyn Bay. Another two kilograms of amphetamine were recovered from the roof lining of a van stopped by police on the A55 road on 11 November 2009.

On 21 May 2010, three Outlaws members – Dawson, Byrne, and Adrian John Sherriff – were convicted at Caernarfon Crown Court of conspiring to supply more than £40,000 worth of drugs. Dawson and Byrne were sentenced to five years' imprisonment while Sherriff was sentenced to four years'. Barnes was cleared of conspiracy. Four other men involved in the drug ring received prison terms varying between eighteen months and 2 1/2 years for their roles. Furthermore, on 25 June 2012, Mold Crown Court banned Dawson and Sherriff from holding office in the club.

== United States ==
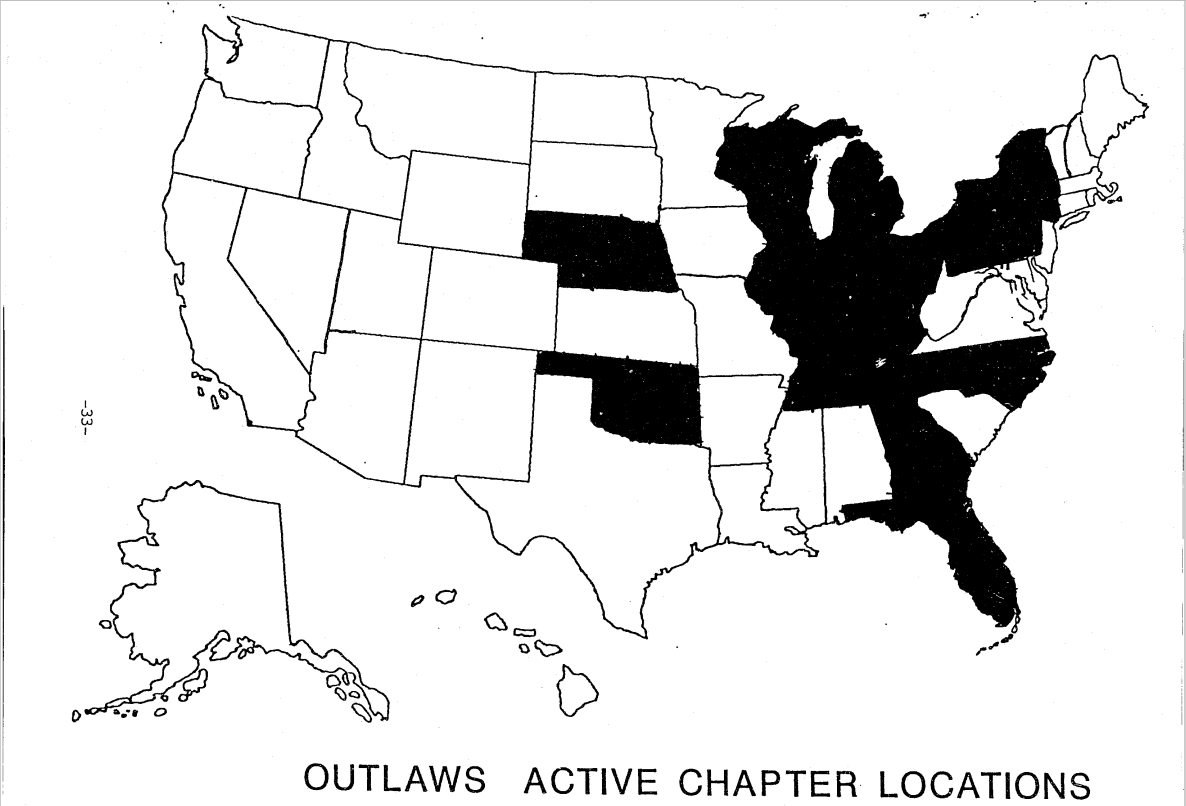
A map showing locations of Outlaws chapters in the United States circa 1991.

The Outlaws are designated an outlaw motorcycle gang by the United States Department of Justice. The dominant biker gang in the Great Lakes region, the Outlaws are based primarily in the Midwest, the Northeast and the Southeast, with more than 700 members and 86 chapters in twenty U.S. states. The club is involved in murder, bombings, assault, kidnapping, prostitution, money laundering, weapons trafficking, motorcycle and motorcycle parts theft, intimidation, insurance fraud, extortion, arson, robbery, stolen property, counterfeiting, contraband smuggling, and the production, smuggling, transportation, and distribution of narcotics. The Outlaws are major producers and distributors of methamphetamine, although they are also involved in the transportation and distribution of marijuana, cocaine, MDMA, and prescription drugs. Additionally, the Outlaws are more heavily involved in prostitution than other motorcycle gangs, and the sex trade is the club's second-most lucrative racket after drug distribution.

The Outlaws are allied with the Bandidos, the Black Pistons, the Breed, the Grim Reapers, and the Gypsy Jokers motorcycle gangs, as well as the Aryan Nations and the Hammerskins. The club has also been criminally associated with the Buffalo, Chicago, Detroit, New Orleans and Pittsburgh crime families. They also maintain an alliance with fellow Hells Angels rivals, the Rock Machine. Rival biker gangs of the Outlaws include the Devils Diciples, the Diablos, El Forastero, the Galloping Goose, the Hells Angels, the Highwaymen, the Iron Horsemen, the Mongols, the Pagans, the Sons of Silence, and the Warlocks.

=== Connecticut ===
The Connecticut State Police raided a property belonging to the Outlaws in Enfield on November 9, 2021. This raid was in relation to the homicide of 38-year-old Jason Comes, who was found shot to death in a car in the neighboring town of Somers on August 5, 2021.

=== Florida ===
The influence of the once powerful South Florida chapter of the Outlaws waned severely following the RICO case against the club, which lasted from 1987 until 1989. By the end of the case, the chapter's membership had diminished to less than a dozen. According to Assistant U.S. Attorney Gregory Kehoe and Sergeant Bob Faulkner of the Broward County Sheriff's Office, the chapter suffered severely from the absence of its charismatic leader, James "Big Jim" Nolan. Outlaws international president Harry "Taco" Bowman transferred Wayne "Joe Black" Hicks to the Fort Lauderdale chapter in order to revive the faltering South Florida faction. The Fort Lauderdale Outlaws had gone rogue, refusing to follow orders from national leadership in Detroit, skimming profits, and partaking in ever-increasing drug use. Under Hicks' management, Fort Lauderdale was revived and reclaimed its status as the Outlaws' strongest chapter after Detroit and Chicago. Hicks rose from chapter president to Florida regional president in 1990. Following a prolonged period of near inactivity, the Outlaws emerged again as a major force following the establishment of two additional chapters in Daytona Beach and Walton Beach, in February 1991.

=== Georgia ===
The Outlaws entered Georgia when the Iron Cross gang of Atlanta "patched over" on October 31, 1970. The Outlaws in Georgia obtain methamphetamine from Mexican cartels and also transport the drug into the state from Mexico, California and Southwestern states, which the club then distributes at midlevel and retail level quantities, primarily in the Atlanta metropolitan area.

Frank Rego Vital of Roberta, an Outlaws member, was shot and killed in an early morning gunfight on June 24, 2007, in the parking lot of The Crazy Horse Saloon strip club in Forest Park by two members of the Renegades MC in what has been described as a self-defense shooting after Vital and other Outlaws members followed the men from the club. Both Renegade members were shot several times but survived.

=== Illinois ===
The Outlaws have 14 chapters and over 150 members in Illinois. The chapters are based in Chicago, Joliet, Pontiac, Kankakee, Peoria, Rockford, and in several counties in Downstate Illinois. The club has three chapters in Chicago; "South Side", "West Side", and "North Side". The South Side chapter, located at a clubhouse on 25th Street and Rockwell Street, was designated the Outlaws' "mother chapter" in 1964. The North Side chapter was initiated via the absorption of the Wheelmen Motorcycle Club in 1993, and was based at 3745 West Division Street in Humboldt Park before relocating to a West Side industrial park in 2017. The West Side chapter was formed in 1994 when the Outlaws amalgamated the High Spirits Motorcycle Club in Bensenville; the chapter later moved to Elgin. In 1991, the club also initiated its "Stateline" chapter in Antioch by absorbing the Booze Runners Motorcycle Club. The Stateline chapter subsequently relocated to Janesville, Wisconsin.

The Outlaws are involved in the distribution of marijuana, methamphetamine and powdered cocaine in the Chicago metropolitan area. The club has been criminally associated with the Chicago Outfit. The Outlaws are also affiliated with the Menard Brotherhood, a "prison biker gang" operating in the Illinois state prison system.

On March 18, 1993, Outlaws members Raymond "Shemp" Morgan and Alan "Al" Smick were stopped by police for a traffic violation in Riverdale and charged with weapons violations after a routine search of their 1971 Chevrolet uncovered a Mason jar containing a human fetus. Police were unable to establish any criminality in regard to the fetus, although Highland, Indiana police detective Thomas James considered it "further evidence of how disgusting these guys really are".

In November 2022, four members of the Outlaws were shot and injured during a confrontation with members of the Mongols at a bar in the Archer Heights area of Chicago.

==== Double O Alliance ====
The coalition between the Outlaws and the Outfit, known as the "Double O Alliance", began as far back as early 1975, when Peter "Greased Lightning" Rogers, the club's security chief, bodyguarded by two Outlaws enforcers, Joseph "Crazy Joe" Spaziano and William "Gatemouth Willie" Edson, held a meeting with senior Mafia members at a Chicago pizzeria. Links between the Outlaws and representatives of mob boss Tony "Joe Batters" Accardo pertaining to vice rackets were established in 1977 by Thomas R. "Westside Tommy" Stimac, a Chicago Outlaws chapter president who later became a member of the club's national ruling board. Stimac served as the contact between various Outlaws chapters and the Mafia. Beginning in 1977, the bikers and mobsters controlled and shared the profits of organized prostitution in Chicago.

From 2001 or earlier, members and associates of the Outlaws and the Outfit colluded to oversee a gambling and burglary ring which was active primarily in and around Cicero but also operated throughout Illinois and in the neighboring states of Wisconsin, Michigan, and Indiana. The enterprise was headed by Michael "The Large Guy" Sarno, a "made man" in the Outfit, and his second-in-command, Mark "Pork Chop" Polchan, a "patched" member of the Outlaws. Another prominent member of the group was Anthony Volpendesto, an Outfit associate, who was the main perpetration in numerous robberies carried out by the gang. Through a business called Amusements Inc., the gang distributed electronic gambling devices to local bars and restaurants, with the enterprise and establishment owners each taking a share of the profits from the machines. Video gambling devices were also placed in Outlaws clubhouses in Chicago's south and west suburbs. In addition to gambling, the enterprise committed over a dozen robberies on homes and jewelry stores in several states. Many of the stolen items were fenced through Goldberg Jewelers, a store owned by Polchan. Members of the enterprise also dealt in other stolen goods, such as cigarettes and electronics.

In the summer of 2002, Vincent Dublino, the owner of a rival video gambling business, C & S Amusements, began supplying video devices to the 47th Street Grill in Lyons, a business previously serviced by Amusements Inc. Dublino was warned by Sarno to "stay the fuck away from the 47th Street Grill" and began to receive threatening phone calls. On February 25, 2003, Polchan, along with Samuel "Sam" Volpendesto, the father of Anthony Volpendesto, detonated a pipe bomb outside the premises of C & S Amusements in Berwyn. The ring was also responsible for numerous heists, including the April 26, 2001 robbery of The Gold Mine Jewelry Store in St. Charles; the May 1, 2002 robbery of Lenna Jewelers in Hinsdale; the May 23, 2002 robbery of Jacqueline's Jewelry in Valparaiso, Indiana; the June 6, 2002 robbery of Husar's House of Fine Diamonds in West Bend, Wisconsin; the March 2003 attempted armed robbery of a residence in Berwyn; the July 9, 2003 armed robbery of Uffenbeck Jewelers in Fond du Lac, Wisconsin; the July 24, 2003 armed robbery of LD Jewelers in Hickory Hills; and the August 25, 2003 armed robbery of Marry Me Jewelry Store in LaGrange Park. The robberies began to taper off following the botched robbery of Marry Me jewelers, during which a salesman was shot in the chest when he resisted.

The Federal Bureau of Investigation (FBI) launched an investigation, known as Operation Double O, into the enterprise. In 2007, one member of the ring, Kyle Knight, was arrested by the government and charged with participating in the Berwyn bombing. Knight pled guilty to a federal charge and agreed to turn state's evidence. On July 30, 2008, several facilities associated with the Outlaws in the Chicago area were raided by agents from the FBI and the Bureau of Alcohol, Tobacco, Firearms and Explosives (ATF). The FBI brought in a SWAT team and an urban assault vehicle to the clubhouse in the west side of the city in case violence were to break out. Polchan and Samuel Volpendesto were arrested in the raids, and numerous weapons, including a live grenade, as well as police badges, a bulletproof vest and a stun gun were seized. On May 27, 2009, federal agents executed search warrants at over two dozen locations in suburban Chicago, and five additional suspects in the Double O Alliance — Sarno, Anthony Volpendesto, Mark Hay, Cicero police officer Dino Vitalo, and Berwyn police officer James Formato — were indicted on racketeering conspiracy charges related to armed robberies, thefts, arson, illegal gambling, and obstruction of justice.

Three defendants in the case, Formato, Hay and Vitalo, pleaded guilty before trial. Hay and Formato agreed to cooperate with the government. Five other members of the enterprise went to trial and were convicted of numerous offenses, including racketeering conspiracy, illegal gambling, conspiracy to damage property by means of an explosive device, and conspiracy to obstruct justice. Anthony Volpendesto was sentenced on August 4, 2011 to 15 years' imprisonment. Samuel Volpendesto was sentenced to 35 years', on August 17, 2011. Polchan was sentenced on October 28, 2011 to 60 years'. On February 8, 2012, Casey Szaflarski, the owner of Amusements Inc., was sentenced to three years' imprisonment, and on February 9, 2012, Sarno was sentenced to 25 years' and ordered to pay $1.8 million in restitution.

Samuel Volpendesto died in prison at the age of 89 on May 17, 2013.

==== War against the Hells Angels ====
On September 18, 1987, Outlaws were involved in a brawl with two Hells Angels members in a bar outside Joliet which left Cleveland Hells Angels chapter president Kenneth "Kenny" Yates shot in the foot and robbed of his club "colors". The shooting reportedly thwarted an attack on an Outlaws clubhouse by Yates and another Hells Angel using automatic firearms and other weaponry.

The Outlaws attempted to coerce the Hell's Henchmen, one of the oldest and largest motorcycle gangs in the Chicago area, into "patching over" to join the Outlaws after the Henchmen forcefully amalgamated the Devil's Ushers biker gang on the West Side of Chicago, a merger which demonstrated the gang's ability to increase its membership to potentially rival the Outlaws. The Outlaws had previously coexisted with the Hell's Henchmen, a gang with chapters in Chicago, Calument City, Rockford and South Bend, Indiana, as the Henchmen had shown no ambition to expand their territory. On November 13, 1990, the Booze Runners, a gang founded and led by Kevin "Spike" O'Neill which was vying for chapter status in the Outlaws, bombed the Hell's Henchmen clubhouse in Rockford. The time bomb exploded while explosives technicians from the Rockford Police Department and the Winnebago County Sheriff's Office were attempting to place the device into a container to detonate it, injuring three police officers. Shortly afterwards, in 1991, the Booze Runners were promoted to a chapter of the Outlaws, with O'Neill being installed as president. The gang became the Outlaws' "Stateline" chapter, which was initially based in Antioch, Illinois before relocating to Janesville, Wisconsin. The chapter also recruited several former members of the Night Sinners, a defunct biker gang in Waukegan.

The Hell's Henchmen resisted the Outlaws' attempts to merge, however, and instead agreed to "prospect" for the Hells Angels after holding a meeting with the Angels in Indiana. The Hells Angels decided to absorb the Hell's Henchmen in order to gain a foothold in the large and lucrative drug trade in the Chicago area. The Hells Angels' expansion into Illinois and Indiana was orchestrated by Patrick "Pat" Matter, the president of the Angels' Minneapolis, Minnesota chapter, which was the closest Hells Angels chapter to Chicago. In late 1993, Outlaws leaders came to suspect that the Hells Angels were attempting to gain a presence in the Chicago area by "patching over" the Hell's Henchmen. The Outlaws then began carrying out a series of violent attacks on the Hell's Henchmen and other gangs affiliated with the Hells Angels in an attempt to discourage them from joining the Hells Angels and to prevent the Hells Angels from infiltrating their territory. The Outlaws also started a recruitment drive by absorbing members of other local gangs in order to offset the Hells Angels' growing presence in the Chicago area.

On October 30, 1993, the Outlaws tried to kill Hell's Henchmen member Edward "Eddie" Murphy with a car bomb. Outlaws biker Randall "Madman" Miller planted a bomb on Murphy's truck outside his home in Fox Lake, but the device failed to explode and fell from the automobile onto Murphy's driveway days later. Upon finding the bomb, Murphy told police that he thought the Outlaws were responsible.

The Outlaws attempted to kill Patrick Matter in Minneapolis, on December 15, 1993. A car bomb attached to Matter's pickup truck exploded outside his motorcycle shop ten minutes after he exited the vehicle.

A second attempt was made on the life of Eddie Murphy, on February 10, 1994, when Kevin "Spike" O'Neill and two other Outlaws ran Murphy's car off the road in Fox Lake and tried to force him into their van. The murder attempt was thwarted, however, when police arrived on the scene. The three Outlaws bikers were arrested and charged with gun violations.

In May 1994, the Outlaws attended Bubba's Honda Drop, an annual Outlaws event in Union Grove, Wisconsin, while simultaneously, members of the Hell's Henchmen partied with Hells Angels at bars in Chicago, Calumet City and Alsip. In the days afterwards, a group of Outlaws visited and trashed each of the bars. At one of the bars, J.R.'s Watering Hole in Calumet City, one of the attackers lost the top of his thumb, which he left behind. Police wanted to retrieve and finger print the thumb, but the tavern owner refused to hand it over as police had taken too long to attend the bar while it was being attacked.

On June 25, 1994, Outlaws Chicago chapter president Peter "Greased Lighting" Rogers was shot in the leg and through the intestines by two Hell's Henchmen, Melvin "Road" Chancey and David "Pulley" Ohlendorf, while riding his motorcycle on the Dan Ryan Expressway. Rogers was returning to Chicago from the Outlaws clubhouse in Gary, Indiana with his bodyguard, Anthony "Ace" Wallenberg, who exited the Expressway at Interstate 55 shortly before the shooting, when he was fired upon from behind. He was treated for his wounds at Cook County Hospital after exiting the Expressway and having a deli owner call an ambulance. Rogers' shooting was ordered by Pat Matter.

On June 28, 1994, Hell's Henchmen Rockford chapter president LaMont "Monte" Mathias was fatally shot, bludgeoned and stabbed in the neck with a screwdriver at M.C. Fabrication, a motorcycle parts shop he owned, by prospective Outlaws member David Wolf. Wolf had traveled to Rockford the day before the murder with two other Outlaws, armed with a .45-caliber automatic pistol. The killing of Matthias was ordered by Kevin "Spike" O'Neill as retaliation for the shooting of Peter Rogers, for which O'Neill believed Matthias had been responsible. O'Neill also instructed Wolf to kill Matthias' girlfriend if she witnessed the murder, although she was not present. The following month, O'Neill paid for a weekend stay for Wolf at the Fantasy Suites Hotel in West Bend, Wisconsin as a reward.

The Outlaws then tried to kill Roger Fiebrantz, Mathias' successor as Rockford Hell's Henchmen president. On October 12, 1994, Fiebrantz was critically injured when a bomb attached to his pickup truck exploded in the driveway of his trailer home at 3129 Coleman Avenue, just outside the Rockford city limits.

The Outlaws carried out two bombings against the Hell's Henchmen on November 7, 1994. Michael "Mike" Coyne, the acting president of the gang's Rockford chapter, was targeted but discovered a bomb underneath his car before it exploded, and an explosive was detonated at the Hell's Henchmen clubhouse in Chicago. No-one was injured in either attack. The clubhouse was again targeted in an attempted arson on December 16, 1994.

On March 3, 1995, Hells Angels member Jack "Four-By" Castle was fatally shot nine times as he sat drinking coffee in his car on the Northwest Side of Chicago. Castle's murder was the final act of violence in the biker war between the Outlaws and the Hells Angels. On June 7, 2001, Orville Cochran was charged with participating in Castle's murder, while Ronald Talmadge was alleged to have destroyed the car used in the killing, in a federal racketeering indictment in Wisconsin.

17 members of the Outlaws were indicted in Wisconsin on federal racketeering charges relating to the Chicago-area biker war, on June 10, 1997.

==== Gauger murders ====
On April 7, 1993, 74-year-old Morris Gauger and his 70-year-old wife Ruth were killed by Outlaws members Randall "Madman" Miller and James "Preacher" Schneider in a robbery attempt-gone-wrong on the couple's farm in Richmond. The couple were bludgeoned and slashed to death, and their bodies were found rolled up in pieces of carpet two days later. According to Schneider, who later turned state's evidence, the killings were sanctioned by Kevin "Spike" O'Neill, the president of the Outlaws "Stateline" chapter based in Janesville, Wisconsin.

The Gaugers' son, Gary Gauger, was wrongfully convicted of murdering the couple and sentenced to death later in 1993. Gary Gauger's conviction was secured by McHenry County State’s Attorney Gary Pack largely based on an alleged confession that Gauger had made during 21 hours of police questioning. Gauger disputed ever making such a statement, and a signed confession was never admitted in court, however. In March 1996, the Illinois Appellate Court overturned Gauger's conviction, ruling that police never had enough probable cause to arrest him. When Pack later appealed the case to the Illinois Supreme Court, the justices declined to hear it.

In early 1996, while Gary Gauger was still on death row, federal authorities came to the conclusion that the Gaugers had been killed by the Outlaws. On June 10, 1997, Miller and Schneider were charged with the murders as part of a racketeering case in Wisconsin against 17 Outlaws members.

=== Indiana ===
The Outlaws chapters in Indiana are involved in the wholesale distribution of methamphetamine and maintain a methamphetamine distribution network by utilizing associates and puppet clubs to conduct retail operations in the Evansville, Terre Haute, Fort Wayne, Lake County and Vigo County areas.

Outlaws member Raymond "Shemp" Morgan allegedly shot a man during a fight in a Hammond lounge in November 1993. He was charged in the shooting in January 1994.

In late 1993, the Outlaws began a series of attacks on gangs affiliated with the Hells Angels in an effort to prevent the Angels from establishing a presence within the Outlaws' territory in the Chicago area after the Hell's Henchmen, a motorcycle gang with chapters in and around Chicago, including in South Bend, held a meeting with the Hells Angels in Indiana and agreed to begin "prospecting" for the Angels. On June 26, 1994, a contingent of Outlaws attended the "Summer Madness" motorcycle rally at the Illiana Motor Speedway in Schererville, an event which was customarily attended by the Invaders biker gang who the Outlaws suspected were affiliated with the Hells Angels. The night before the rally, Outlaws international president Harry "Taco" Bowman met with the attending Outlaws leaders, including Gary chapter president Randy "Mad" Yager, and gave the order to attack members of the Invaders at the speedway the following day. To carry out the attack, the Outlaws planned to use a "war wagon", a vehicle modified with steel plating and several gun ports and equipped with firearms and other weapons. Yager and Milwaukee Outlaws chapter president Edward "Shock" Anastas reportedly threatened to authorities that if the Invaders appeared at the event "you'd better stop them at the gate or there's going to be bodies everywhere".

Worried about the safety of her boyfriend, an Outlaws member's girlfriend alerted the Gary police of the arranged violence at the Summer Madness rally, and the police in turn warned the Invaders not to attend the event. The rally passed without incident as the Invaders failed to appear at the speedway. As the procession of Outlaws were leaving the event, police stopped the armored van, seizing guns, ammunition and smoke grenades, and arresting six Outlaws from Milwaukee. Two of the bikers, Elias "Eli" Vallejo Jr. and Robert "Moon" Paul, were charged with possessing a gun without a permit. Rather than retaliate against the Outlaws, the Invaders disbanded, with some members joining the Hells Angels and the rest retiring from crime.

In September 1994, the Outlaws attempted to bomb the Hell's Henchmen clubhouse in South Bend by aiming a driverless car loaded with explosives at the building. The explosives failed to detonate after the car hit the clubhouse.

On January 29, 1995, Outlaws member Donald "Big Don" Fogg was killed in a vacant lot in the Midtown area of Gary. Authorities suspect Fogg was killed by the Outlaws due to his inability to remain silent regarding the murder of Hells Angel Michael Quale, who was shot in New York in 1994.

On July 11, 2012, the Federal Bureau of Investigation (FBI) raided Outlaws clubhouses in Indianapolis and Fort Wayne and arrested 42 members for crimes ranging from mail fraud to money laundering. Law enforcement agencies conducted the raids at dawn in an attempt to catch members off guard. U.S. Attorney Joe Hogsett said their offenses included using violence to collect debts and illegal gambling operations.

=== Kentucky ===
The Outlaws merged with the Gypsy Raiders motorcycle gang of Louisville in August 1964.

The Jefferson County Police Department raided the Outlaws clubhouse in the Lake Dreamland neighborhood of Louisville on January 25, 1970, arresting 21 members and a 23-year-old woman on charges of disorderly conduct. Three Outlaws from Milwaukee—John Wayne Buschman, Joseph Schmitt, and Paul Jay Buetlner—were additionally charged with weapon and drug possession. Seven pistols, a shotgun, a rifle, brass knuckles, five knives, marijuana, barbiturates and amphetamines were confiscated. Around two hours after the police raid, the clubhouse was destroyed by a fire in a suspected arson.

On September 10, 1982, two Outlaws members were shot and wounded while riding their motorcycles on Interstate 275 in Campbell County.

Three members of the Outlaws' Louisville chapter—David Hugh Walker, Thomas Charles Dentith, and James "Bean" Nail—were indicted on federal drug and weapons charges as a result of an investigation by a multiagency task force. On March 26, 1984, former Louisville chapter president Nail pleaded guilty to selling one ounce of cocaine to an undercover Kentucky State Police detective on two occasions in 1983, and being a felon in possession of a firearm—a .45 caliber revolver—for which he was sentenced to seven years' imprisonment. Dentith, who had succeeded Nail as president of the Louisville chapter, pleaded guilty to an assortment of weapons charges and was sentenced to five years'.

=== Maine ===
On June 15, 2010, the Bureau of Alcohol, Tobacco, Firearms and Explosives (ATF) carried out raids in seven U.S. states, including Maine, and arrested 27 members and associates of the Outlaws who were indicted by a federal grand jury in Virginia. Maine chapter president Thomas "Taz" Benvie, former Maine chapter president Joseph Allman, and Michael "Madman" Pendini, a former enforcer in the Northern Maine chapter, were taken into custody.

=== Massachusetts ===
In 1993, the Outlaws expanded into Massachusetts with a chapter in Brockton.

On June 3, 2005, two Outlaws members, Stephan Stelmach and Brian McHugh, allegedly committed a racist attack on a Haitian man, Alan Baptiste, by punching him and hitting him with a ballpeen hammer at T.J. Spirits, a bar in Ashland. McHugh and Stelmach were arrested by police on Route 135 after fleeing on motorcycles. The bikers were indicted on federal charges of interfering with the civil rights of Baptiste. Defense attorneys for Stelmach and McHugh maintained that Baptiste had initiated the altercation and that there was no racial motivation behind the incident. On October 9, 2007, McHugh was acquitted and a mistrial was declared against Stelmach, for whom a jury failed to reach a verdict. A retrial also ended in a mistrial against Stelmach, on December 20, 2007, and the U.S. Attorney's office subsequently declared that Stelmach would not be tried a third time.

=== New Hampshire ===
The New Hampshire State Police, along with the Belknap County Sheriff's Office and local police, planned to provide additional security at a Lynyrd Skynyrd concert scheduled to be held at the Meadowbrook Musical Arts Center in Gilford on June 15, 2005 during Laconia Motorcycle Week due to the expected presence of members of the Outlaws and the Hells Angels and anticipated gang violence. The concert was ultimately rescheduled due to a recurring case of strep throat suffered by Lynyrd Skynyrd lead vocalist Johnny Van Zant.

=== New York ===
In October 1993, while the Outlaws were on their annual Halloween "Pumpkin Run", two hand grenades were thrown into the home of Buffalo Outlaws chapter president Walter "Fat Wally" Posnjak. Posnjak's family survived without injury. The attack was considered a violation of a loose etiquette among bikers which dictates that the families of gang members are off limits.

Hells Angels member Michael Quale was killed in a shootout in Lancaster in September 1994. Outlaws members Edward Anastas, Ronald Talmadge and Orville Cochran were charged with being involved in the events leading up to Quale's killing in a federal racketeering indictment in Wisconsin on June 7, 2001.

=== North Carolina ===
The Outlaws transport various drugs – primarily cocaine, methamphetamine, and marijuana – into North Carolina via allied motorcycle gangs and associates in the Southwestern United States, which are then distributed at retail-level throughout the state on the club's behalf by smaller biker gangs and female associates from fronts such as motorcycle shops, exotic dance clubs, bars, and tattoo parlors.

The Bureau of Alcohol, Tobacco, Firearms and Explosives (ATF) carried out raids in North Carolina and six other U.S. states on June 15, 2010, arresting 27 Outlaws members and associates who had been indicted by a federal grand jury in Virginia. Copper region president and Charlotte chapter member "Little" David Lowry; Copper region vice president and Lexington chapter member Harold "Lil Dave" Herndon; Asheville chapter president Chris Gagner; Lexington chapter president James "Vern" Townsend; Hickory chapter president Michael Smith; William "Rebel" Davie, a former enforcer in the Asheville chapter; Hickory chapter members Mark "Lytnin" Spradling and Brian McDermott; and Harry Rhyne McCall of the Lexington chapter were taken into custody.

=== Ohio ===
The Outlaws have formed chapters in Dayton, Columbus, East Columbus, Warren, Middletown, Toledo, Sandusky, Canton and Athens. The Outlaws in Ohio are involved principally in drug manufacturing and distribution, prostitution, and extortion. The Youngstown Outlaws chapter has been associated with the Pittsburgh crime family in contract killing, witness intimidation, debt collection, drug dealing, arson and assaults.

==== Gang wars ====
A gunfight between members of Outlaws, the Animals, and the Invaders resulted in an Invaders biker being shot in the hip in Batavia on March 2, 1969. The Outlaws allegedly initiated the conflict in an effort to prevent the rival clubs from gaining prominence.

A violent rivalry between the Outlaws and the Iron Horsemen in Greater Cincinnati began in the late 1960s. An Outlaws biker was shot in the back by a member of the Iron Horsemen on Montgomery Road in Cincinnati on December 2, 1972 following a fight between two women associated with the clubs.

The Iron Horsemen's clubhouse in Norwood was bombed by the Outlaws on July 10, 1973. Two days later, on July 12, 1973, the home of an Iron Horsemen member in the Pleasant Ridge neighborhood of Cincinnati was also bombed.

On May 18, 1975, Invaders member Billy J. Schmidt was killed and four others were wounded during a gun battle at the Fugueros clubhouse in Middletown that also involved members of the Outlaws, the Iron Horsemen and the Saints.

The conflict between the Outlaws and the Hells Angels resulted in at least twelve homicides in Northeast Ohio in the years leading up to 1986.

The outlaw biker scene in Cincinnati has historically been dominated by the Iron Horsemen, and Outlaws members traditionally avoided the city. In early January 1989, two Outlaws members were assaulted by members of the Iron Horsman in Cincinnati. On January 14, 1989, two members of the Freeboarders, an AMA-sanctioned biker club affiliated with the Outlaws, were assaulted by Iron Horsemen during a bar brawl at Franz Brothers Cafe in the Camp Washington neighborhood of Cincinnati, after inviting Outlaws members to a party at the bar. One of the victims was hit in the face with a baseball bat and the other was shot in the back. According to law enforcement, the Outlaws were in the process of recruiting the Freeboarders in order to gain a foothold in Cincinnati, which provoked retaliation from the Iron Horsemen.

On January 21, 1989, members of around ten motorcycle clubs, including the Freeboarders, the Aeolas, the Iron Horsemen and the Outlaws' Dayton chapter, were meeting at Vic's Brew and Cue, a tavern in Mount Carmel, to organize various motorcycle runs and charity events when a shootout erupted, killing two people – Kenneth "Hambone" Hammond, the president of the Dayton Outlaws and the club's international sergeant-at-arms, and Kenneth Cassella, an Iron Horsemen member from New York – and leaving another four Outlaws – Joseph Brown, William Bragg, Patrick Puttick, and James Russell – hospitalized in serious condition. Three people were arrested and charged with carrying concealed weapons, and an assortment of guns, including a high-powered assault rifle, were confiscated by police. Hammond was buried next to the graves of other Outlaws members at Bear Creek Cemetery in Dayton on January 27, 1989, following a funeral attended by around 300 gang members.

==== Violent incidents ====
A police officer was critically wounded in a shootout during a raid of the Outlaws' clubhouse in Miamisburg on January 8, 1980.

On February 24, 2001, several members of the Dayton Outlaws chapter, along with members of the Avenger Motorcycle Club, visited Spanky's Dollhouse, a strip club in the Dayton suburb of Harrison Township. A fight broke out between the bikers and a group of four African-American men after racially-charged comments were made. One of the black males, Eric Lavern Coulter Jr., struck an Outlaws member, James Foster, in the head with a chair. Foster responded by beating Coulter with a wooden club, and another Outlaw, Allen Chester "Psycho" Lawson, hit Coulter with a beer bottle. A third Outlaws member, Glen D. "Hot Rod" Carlisle, then shot Coulter in the buttocks before an Avenger member shot him a second time, causing Coulter to die from his wounds at the scene. Foster pleaded guilty to aggravated assault and was sentenced to 15 months' imprisonment, Lawson was convicted of felonious assault and sentenced to three years', and Carlisle pleaded guilty to voluntary manslaughter and was sentenced to nine years'.

==== Drug trafficking ====
In August 1984, two leaders of the Youngstown Outlaws chapter and three associates were arrested by the Federal Bureau of Investigation (FBI) and charged with manufacturing and distributing drugs, including LSD, methadone and cocaine, distributing 2,000 Valium tablets, and possession with intent to distribute 16,000 more.

In December 1997, the Toledo office of the FBI, along with various state law enforcement agencies, initiated an investigation of the "Green region" of the Outlaws, consisting of chapters in Dayton; Fort Wayne, Indiana; Louisville, Kentucky; Indianapolis, Indiana; and Oklahoma City, Oklahoma. The investigation began after the FBI was tipped off by an Outlaws member who owed a drug debt to the club that the Outlaws were attempting to forcibly amalgamate a rival gang in Lima. Several Outlaws became confidential FBI informants during the operation. In April 2003, following a five-year investigation, 38 Outlaws members and associates, including international president James Lee "Frank" Wheeler, were indicted by a federal grand jury in the U.S. District Court for the Northern District of Ohio and charged with various offenses, including RICO violations; conspiring to distribute large quantities of cocaine, methamphetamine, LSD, marijuana, ecstasy and Valium; extortion; and firearms offenses. 800 pounds of cocaine, 500 pounds of marijuana, 100 pounds of methamphetamine, 900,000 units of Valium, and over 100,000 doses of LSD were seized.

After a two-month trial in U.S. District Court in Toledo, a federal jury on June 1, 2004 found ten of fourteen defendants in the case, including Wheeler, guilty of racketeering, and twelve of the defendants guilty of conspiracy to participate in racketeering. 101 witnesses testified in during the trial, including former Outlaws members who had recorded conversations on behalf of investigators by wearing recording devices. On December 20, 2004, Wheeler was sentenced to life in prison.

On August 1, 2008, the U.S. Court of Appeals for the Sixth Circuit overturned the racketeering convictions of Wheeler, who argued that he had been convicted on the same charges at an earlier trial in Florida, for which he was sentenced to sixteen and a half years in prison, and Gregory Driver, for whom the court ruled there had not been enough evidence to convict. Wheeler was not released from prison, however, as he had been sentenced to life. The court ordered Driver be resentenced on a drug conspiracy charge.

=== Oklahoma ===
The Oklahoma City chapter of the Outlaws was granted on October 31, 1979 after seven local bikers served a probationary period. The Oklahoma City chapter, which is the Outlaws' westernmost chapter, is the headquarters of the club's "South" region.

=== Pennsylvania ===
In September 1985, Ronald "Huey" Scherrer, a member of an Outlaws chapter based in Armstrong County, and his partner, Karen "Level" Askey, were arrested after selling over 9,000 doses of LSD to an undercover Federal Bureau of Investigation (FBI) agent outside a Holiday Inn in Butler. According to the FBI, the LSD was manufactured in an Outlaws laboratory located in Ohio. Scherrer died on January 17, 2023, at the age of 68.

A year-long federal drug investigation centered on New Kensington and northern Westmoreland County resulted in the arrests of 23 members, former members and associates of the Outlaws, the Pagans and the Hells Angels, including Western Pennsylvania Outlaws chapter president John J. "JJ" Flick, on drug and firearm charges in January 1986.

=== South Carolina ===
On June 15, 2010, 27 Outlaws members and associates were arrested in raids carried out by the Bureau of Alcohol, Tobacco, Firearms and Explosives (ATF) in seven U.S. states, including South Carolina, after being indicted by a federal grand jury in Virginia. Copper region enforcer and Rock Hill chapter president Michael "M & M" Mariaca and Leslie "Les" Werth, the Rock Hill chapter vice president and former Copper region president, were taken into custody.

=== Tennessee ===
Raids were carried out by the Bureau of Alcohol, Tobacco, Firearms and Explosives (ATF) in Tennessee and six other U.S. states on June 15, 2010 after 27 Outlaws members and associates were indicted by a federal grand jury in Virginia. Knoxville chapter member and former Grey Region president Mark "Ivan" Lester was among those arrested.

=== Virginia ===
The Outlaws expanded into Virginia in 2006 after reaching an accord with the Pagan's. In September 2008, a group of over fifty Outlaw and Pagan bikers prepared to confront members of the Merciless Souls Motorcycle Cub, a gang affiliated with the Hells Angels, at Virginia Motorsports Park in Dinwiddie. Violence was prevented, however, due to a large presence of law enforcement personnel at the event.

In November 2008, Outlaws members assaulted an African American man in a racist attack at the Hard Times Café in Fredericksburg. The bikers then intimidated witnesses and instructed fellow Outlaws members to lie to obstruct a law enforcements investigation of the assault.

On March 14, 2009, Outlaws and Pagan's members lured members of the Hells Angels and the Desperados Motorcycle Club into an ambush by sending three Outlaws wearing their "colors" into the Cockade Bar in Petersburg in which the rival bikers were drinking. Three other Outlaws inside the bar, who were incognito without club "colors", as well as others who waited outside then trapped and assaulted the Hells Angels and Desperados. Local police arrived and ended the violence, seizing a knife and brass knuckles from an Outlaws member, after the brawl spilled out into the bar's parking lot.

On June 15, 2010, a grand jury in the U.S. District Court for the Eastern District of Virginia indicted 27 Outlaws members and associates on various charges under the Racketeer Influenced and Corrupt Organizations Act (RICO) related to participating in a criminal enterprise that engaged in assaults, kidnapping, drug dealing, illegal gambling, and attempted murder. The Bureau of Alcohol, Tobacco, Firearms and Explosives (ATF) arrested the defendants during a series of raids carried out in seven U.S. states. In Virginia, Mark Steven "Snuff" Fiel, Brett Longendyke, Thomas "Jo Jo" Petrini, Christopher "Alibi" Timbers and Mark Jason Fiel of the Outlaws' Manassas/Shenandoah Valley chapter and four members of the Pagan's were taken into custody.

=== Wisconsin ===
The American Outlaws Association "patched over" the Gypsy Outlaws gang of Milwaukee on July 4, 1964. Establishing drug trafficking and car theft operations, the Milwaukee Outlaws chapter came to be known as the "Wrecking Crew". According to a 1980 Drug Enforcement Administration (DEA) report, the Milwaukee chapter controlled the methamphetamine market in Wisconsin. The Outlaws are also involved in the distribution of cocaine and marijuana throughout the Milwaukee metropolitan area. The club has seven chapters and approximately 60 "full-patched" members in Wisconsin.

On September 30, 1977, three members of the Milwaukee Outlaws chapter – Michael "Sledge" Goodman, Roger F. "Rocker" Lyons and "Horrible" Harry Ross – were involved in a bar brawl with three other men who were playing pool at the Bus Stop Tavern on Milwaukee's northwest side. After police were called, twelve officers arrived and evicted five of the men from the premises. Lyons refused to leave until he was allowed to finish his drink, however, and he was restrained and handcuffed. According to several witnesses, Lyons was then beaten unconscious by police with batons and placed in a police van. He was first taken to District No. 7 station house and subsequently pronounced dead on arrival at Milwaukee County Hospital. A medical examiner's inquest ruled that Lyons' death was "the result of brain swelling and concussion due to multiple blunt trauma injuries" and concluded that the "manner of death was the unlawful homicide by reckless conduct caused by a person or persons undetermined". A coroner's inquest and a federal grand jury found no evidence to justify prosecution of the Milwaukee Police Department (MPD).

After private detective Ira B. Robins was hired by the Outlaws to seek new evidence in the case, retired police officer Robert M. Schmidt shed new light on the events surrounding Lyons' homicide in 1995, claiming that Lyons was already dead when he arrived at the District No. 7 station house and that the officers involved convened in a room to write their reports as the van carrying Lyons sat in the station garage for "at least 15 minutes". In 1996, Wisconsin State Senator David Zien sought to reopen the case, saying: "There has been a wrong done here, and we need to right that wrong".

In 1992, around forty members of the Outlaws crashed a party being held by the Milwaukee-based Sinners Motorcycle Club and thereafter began pressuring the Sinners to wear an "A.O.A." patch on their vests to show allegiance to the Outlaws. The Sinners refused to capitulate to the Outlaws' demands, leading to a confrontation at the Sinners' clubhouse at which Sinner Charles "Peewee" Goldsmith was stabbed in the back with a screwdriver. The Sinners disbanded after only six of the club's 26 members voted to go to war with the Outlaws, with the other twenty handing in their patches. Sinners president Goldsmith subsequently fled Milwaukee and joined the Hells Angels' Minneapolis chapter.

On August 24, 1992, Donald Wagner was killed by the Outlaws in Racine County.

On August 5, 1993, two members of the Hells Angels were beaten and robbed of their club "colors" by four or five Outlaws bikers in a Janesville bar. Janesville was an annual stopping point for Hells Angels from the South en route to the club's chapter in Minneapolis, Minnesota.

On June 10, 1997, U.S. Attorney Thomas P. Schneider announced the indictments of 17 Outlaws members in the U.S. District Court for the Eastern District of Wisconsin on federal racketeering charges related to crimes committed by the gang between 1988 and 1997, including arsons, bombings, robberies, six murders and five attempted murders. Twelve of those indicted were members of the "Stateline" chapter in Janesville, two were members of the South Side, Chicago chapter, another two were members of the Gary, Indiana chapter, and the other was a member of the La Crosse, Wisconsin chapter. The indictments primarily stemmed from the Outlaws' war against the Hells Angels and followed a four-year investigation by the Chicago and Milwaukee offices of the Bureau of Alcohol, Tobacco, Firearms and Explosives (ATF). The ATF's investigation of the Outlaws was aided by testimony from two former members, Mark "Crash" Quinn and Harry "Lord of Laziness" Raymond Jr. Quinn had turned state's evidence when his parole was revoked and he was returned to a Wisconsin state prison on a battery and intimidation conviction after being arrested by the Illinois State Police in March 1994.

14 of the 17 bikers were arrested on June 10, 1997.

Six Outlaws members from Wisconsin and Illinois were indicted in the Eastern District of Wisconsin on June 7, 2001 on federal racketeering and drug conspiracy charges. The indictments followed a two-year investigation by the federal ATF along with state and local law enforcement agencies. Five of the bikers – Edward J. Anastas, Ronald A. Talmadge, Thomas E. Sienkowski, Scott L. Hammond and Gregory A. Mayer – were arrested during a series of coordinated raids, while the other, Orville J. Cochran, remained at large. The indictment charged that the Outlaws were responsible for drug trafficking and numerous incidents related to the gang war with the Hells Angels, including bombings and the murders of Hells Angels members Michael Quale, in Lancaster, New York in September 1994, and Jack Castle, in Chicago in March 1995. Facing the possibility of life imprisonment, Talmadge, a member of the Joliet, Illinois chapter and former regional president, turned state's evidence.

On June 15, 2010, the ATF arrested 27 members and associates of the Outlaws during a series of raids carried out in seven U.S. states, including Wisconsin. Outlaws international president "Milwaukee" Jack Rosga was among those taken into custody.

== See also ==
- Bandidos MC criminal allegations and incidents
- Hells Angels MC criminal allegations and incidents
- Mongols MC criminal allegations and incidents

== Sources ==
=== Books ===
- Lavigne, Yves (1996). Hell's Angels: Into the Abyss. New York City: HarperCollins. ISBN 9780006385707.
- Langton, Jerry (2006). Fallen Angel: The Unlikely Rise of Walter Stadnick and the Canadian Hells Angels. Toronto: Harper Collins. ISBN 144342725X.
- Barker, Thomas (2007). Biker Gangs and Organized Crime. Oxfordshire: Routledge. ISBN 9781593454067.
- Schneider, Stephen (2009). Iced: The Story of Organized Crime in Canada (2nd ed.). Toronto: John Wiley & Sons. ISBN 978-0470835005.
- Langton, Jerry (2010). Showdown: How the Outlaws, Hells Angels and Cops Fought for Control of the Streets. Toronto: John Wiley & Sons. ISBN 978-0470678787.
- Caine, Alex (2012). Charlie and the Angels: The Outlaws, the Hells Angels and the Sixty Years War. Toronto: Random House Canada. ISBN 9780307358950.
- Roberts, Walter (2012). Biker Gangs. London: RW Press. ISBN 9781909284067.
- Haynes, Rose M. (2013). The Ore Knob Mine Murders: The Crimes, the Investigation and the Trials. Jefferson: McFarland & Co. ISBN 9780786473168.
- Droban, Kerrie; James, Peter (2017). The Last Chicago Boss: My Life with the Chicago Outlaws Motorcycle Club. New York City: St. Martin's Press. ISBN 9781250105912.

=== Reports ===
- Hand, F. D. (1983). 1982 Annual Report (PDF) (Report). Georgia Organized Crime Prevention Council. Archived from the original (PDF) on October 18, 2024 – via Government of Georgia.
- Ohio OC Consulting Committee (1986). 1986 Report of the Organized Crime Consulting Committee (PDF) (Report). Attorney General of Ohio. Archived from the original (PDF) on June 30, 2022 – via National Criminal Justice Reference Service.
- Richardson, A. (May 1991). Outlaw Motorcycle Gangs – USA Overview (PDF) (Report). State of California Department of Justice, Bureau of Organized Crime and Criminal Intelligence. Archived from the original (PDF) on May 26, 2023 – via United States Department of Justice.
