= Sons of Silence =

International outlaw motorcycle club

Sons of Silence MC
- Abbreviation: SOSMC
- Founded: 1966; 60 years ago
- Founder: Bruce Richardson
- Founded at: Niwot, Colorado, U.S.
- Type: Outlaw motorcycle club
- Headquarters: Colorado Springs, Colorado, U.S.
- Region served: International (35 chapters in the United States and Germany)
- Members: 500–600
- Website: sonsofsilence.com

The Sons of Silence Motorcycle Club (SOSMC) is an international outlaw motorcycle club. Founded in Niwot, Colorado in the United States in 1966, the club has a membership of over 250, with 35 chapters based in 12 U.S. states and in Germany. The Sons of Silence are the sixth-largest motorcycle club in the world, behind the Hells Angels, the Bandidos, the Outlaws, the Pagans and the Mongols.

The United States Department of Justice has designated the Sons of Silence a criminal organization.

== History ==
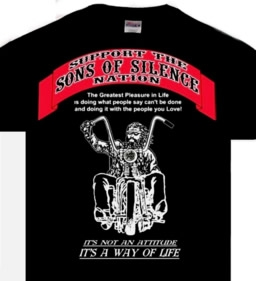
A Sons of Silence support T-shirt.

The Sons of Silence Motorcycle Club was founded in Niwot, Colorado in 1966 by Bruce Gale "The Dude" Richardson, who was living in Longmont after serving in the U.S. Navy from July 1958 to February 1960. Richardson later left the club and died of natural causes in Scottsbluff, Nebraska on March 26, 2013. The Sons of Silence's national headquarters were moved to Colorado Springs. Another influential figure in the club's history was Leonard Lloyd "J.R." Reed, Jr. Also a navy veteran who served from 1965 until 1969, Reed succeeded Richardson as the Sons of Silence's national president in 1977 and held the position for twenty-two years. In the 1990s, Reed and Richard Lester, an attorney and motorcyclist, formed the Colorado Confederation of Clubs, which improved communication between motorcycle clubs and provided a means to avoid conflict. Reed died at the age of 55 in Denver on June 20, 2003 and was given a club funeral featuring a large funeral procession of motorcyclists on Interstate 25.

The club is based primarily in the Mountain states and the Midwest. The first chapter outside Colorado was the Iowa chapter which was founded in 1968, and an alliance with the Hells Angels enabled the Sons of Silence to further expand. There are now U.S. chapters in Arkansas, Colorado, Florida, Idaho, Illinois, Indiana, Kansas, Kentucky, Louisiana, Minnesota, Mississippi, Missouri, North Dakota, South Dakota, Utah and Wyoming. The first international chapter was founded in Munich, Germany in 1998. In 2001, additional German chapters were founded in Freising, Gangkofen and Nurnberg. Branches in Viernheim, Erding and Pfarrkirchen were established in 2007, 2010 and 2016, respectively.

== Insignia ==
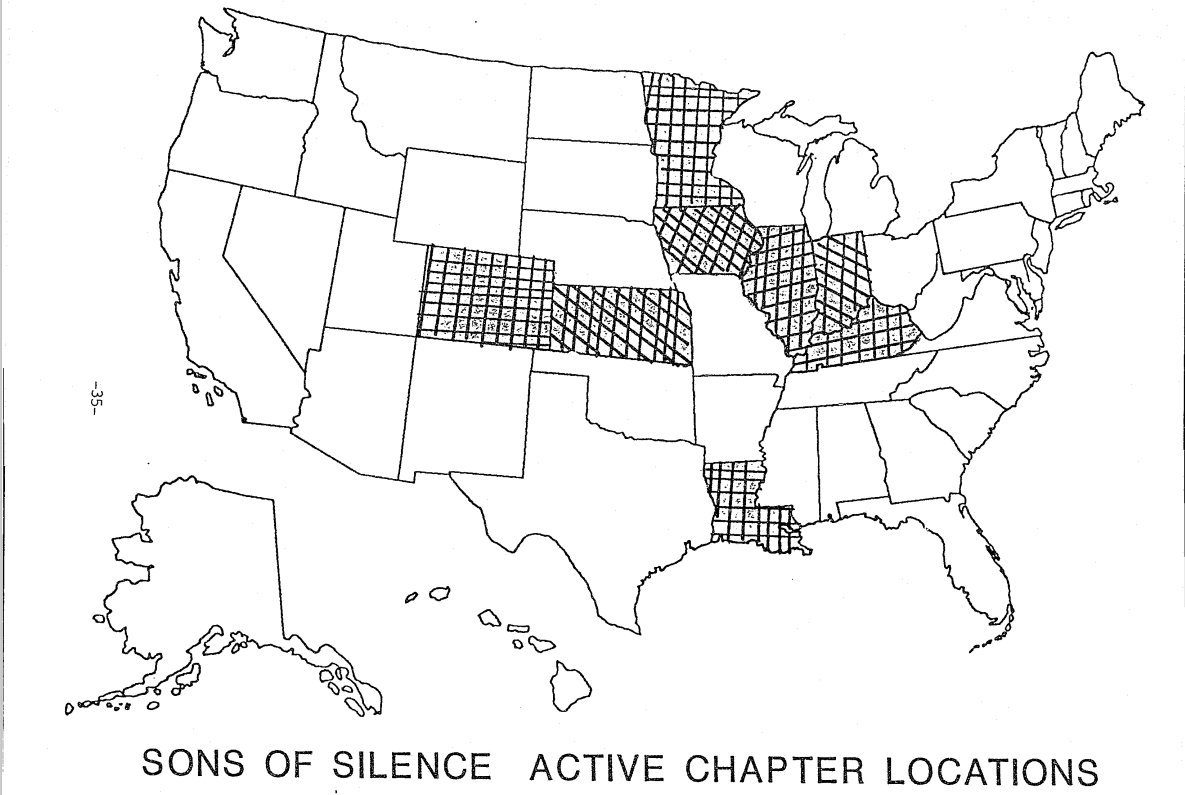
A map issued by the DOJ in 1991, showing the locations of Sons of Silence chapters in the United States.

The Sons of Silence's insignia features an American eagle superimposed over the letter "A". The emblem is similar to, and inspired by, the Anheuser-Busch logo. This insignia is worn as a patch that is sewn on the back of each full member's cut-off jacket (known as "colors"), along with assorted other badges featuring symbols and phrases. The additional patches worn by Sons of Silence members commonly include the "1%" emblem and Totenkopf imagery.

The club's motto is "donec mors non separat ", a Latin phrase meaning "until death separates us".

== Membership and organization ==
The Sons of Silence organization is headquartered in Colorado Springs, Colorado. The club has 30 chapters located in 12 U.S. states and another five chapters in Germany, with a combined total membership estimated at between 250 and 500. Each chapter maintains a self-governing hierarchy, which typically consists of a president, vice president, secretary-treasurer, and sergeant-at-arms.

Sons of Silence members must be at least twenty-one years old and own a Harley-Davidson or Indian motorcycle. Members pledge oaths of loyalty and secrecy.

== Criminal allegations and incidents ==
Sons of Silence MC
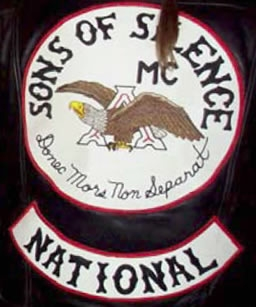
- Sons of Silence colors
- Founded: 1966
- Founder: Bruce Richardson
- Founding location: Niwot, Colorado, United States
- Years active: 1966–present
- Territory: 30 chapters in 12 U.S. states, and 5 chapters in Germany
- Membership (est.): 500–600
- Activities: Drug trafficking, witness intimidation, extortion, prostitution, money laundering, weapons trafficking, motor vehicle theft, murder, assault
- Allies: Hells Angels MC; Iron Horsemen MC
- Rivals: Outlaws MC

The Sons of Silence are classified as an outlaw motorcycle gang by the United States Department of Justice and have traditionally been considered part of the "big five" biker gangs, along with the Bandidos, the Hells Angels, the Outlaws and the Pagans. The club has since been surpassed in membership size by the Mongols, however. The Sons of Silence are involved in numerous criminal activities, including murder, assault, drug trafficking, intimidation, extortion, prostitution operations, money laundering, weapons trafficking, and motorcycle and motorcycle parts theft. The club is allied with the Hells Angels and the Iron Horsemen, and is a rival of the Outlaws.

=== Colorado ===
The Sons of Silence are among the most active motorcycle club in Colorado. The club maintains a number of chapters in the state, including in Colorado Springs, Fort Collins, Aurora, Grand Junction, and two in Denver. The Sons of Silence are involved in the distribution of methamphetamine at wholesale and retail levels in Colorado, obtaining the drug from Mexican drug cartels and also producing it themselves in Weld County. The Coloradan chapters of the club also transport and distribute methamphetamine to other states, including North Dakota.

Six members – Scott Bennigsdorf, John Barnard, Bobby Mann, Art Miller, Mark Wagar, and national president Bruce Richardson – were charged with assault with a deadly weapon and jailed for their involvement in a bar brawl in Colorado Springs on March 5, 1972. The brawl involved a total of twenty-two participants and was the result of a power struggle between the Sons of Silence and two other motorcycle clubs, the Dead Men and a group known as Philtown. Some of the Sons of Silence members arrested were involved in an alleged conspiracy to kill police and kidnap the children of police officers earlier that year.

Sons of Silence member Brian Karl Young was convicted of criminally negligent homicide in the death of a sixteen-year-old girl who was killed when Young accidentally discharged a .22 caliber Ruger rifle that he had been making alterations to at the Sons of Silence clubhouse in Commerce City on October 3, 1982.

Six members of the Sons of Silence – Jack E. Houser, Jr., James Dean "Jimmy" Jahnke, Jerald W. Richardson, Larry Lee Richardson, Dennis Raymond Swingler and Ralph W. Vicory – were convicted of conspiracy to manufacture and distribute methamphetamine after Houser, Jahnke, Swingler and Vicory were arrested on I-80 in Wyoming while transporting thirty-six pounds of the drug as well as a mobile drug lab obtained from Cecelia Martinez – wife of the imprisoned Barhoppers Motorcycle Club president Glen Gary – in Modesto, California on January 23, 1983 to Denver. The convictions followed an FBI investigation into the Colorado Sons of Silence which commenced in September 1981 and was aided by FBI informant Beth Fisher, the divorced wife of club member Robert Fisher.

A Sons of Silence member was charged with the murder of a member of the Diablos Lobos gang who was killed in an Aurora bar amidst a turf war involving the groups in 1983.

Another bar fight involving the Sons of Silence and the Invaders motorcycle gang at a Denver tavern resulted in a series of sporadic shootings. Sons of Silence biker Ron Bemis was shot to death in his driveway by Invaders member Alfred H. "Crazy Al" Mills, who was subsequently convicted of murder.

Sons of Silence member Paul Robert "P.K." Klein was shot and killed by Eugene Herbert Baylis at Jim and I's Star Bar in Colorado Springs, where Klein was the bar manager, on April 17, 1993. Bar patron Steven Fairfax was also killed and five others were wounded. Baylis, who was armed with an AK-47 assault rifle and four hand grenades, only stopped his shooting spree after he was shot and wounded by a police officer. Baylis claimed that Klein had shot him with a pellet gun earlier that day and that he had gone to the bar to detain him until police had arrived. He was acquitted of murder and other charges in 1995 after his attorneys argued that he fired in self-defense. Baylis would later be sentenced to three years in prison on federal weapons charges, and was killed in a shootout with Bureau of Land Management (BLM) officers in May 2018. The shootout at Jim and I's was the subject of "The Outlaw", episode 10 of season 6 of the Investigation Discovery documentary series Homicide Hunter.

Sons of Silence president Leonard Ray Shipley was arrested by Colorado Springs police following an undercover operation in August 1993. Shipley was convicted in April 1995 of distribution and possession of methamphetamine, possession of a grenade simulator and being a special offender for having both a deadly weapon and illegal drugs, and he was later sentenced to twenty-four years in prison.

On October 9, 1999, thirty-seven Sons of Silence members were arrested on drug trafficking and illegal weapons charges after one of Colorado's largest federal undercover operations. The Bureau of Alcohol, Tobacco and Firearms (ATF) raided a number of homes and properties in Colorado Springs, Commerce City and Fort Collins, and seized twenty pounds of methamphetamine, thirty-five guns, four hand grenades, two suppressors, cash and motorcycles. The investigation began in 1997 and involved two undercover agents infiltrating the club. Among those arrested were the club's national president Leonard Reed and vice-president Steven Kressin. The club was featured in a 2009 episode of Gangland, which included interviews with one of the undercover agents who infiltrated the club.

Two men – Stanley B. Glade and Justin W. Jeske – were arrested after assaulting and robbing a Sons of Silence member at his home in Longmont on April 17, 2012. Glade and Jeske are allegedly former club members who were expelled.

=== Indiana ===
The Sons of Silence, along with the Diablos, are the primary wholesalers of methamphetamine in Vigo County, transporting the drug into the area via the Southwestern United States.

The first Sons of Silence chapter in Indiana was formed in the 1970s by Michael "Righteous Mike" Ramsey, a former member of the Outlaws who left that club in 1974 amid internal dissension and was granted permission by Sons of Silence founder Bruce "The Dude" Richardson to establish an SOSMC chapter in Indianapolis. Ramsey went on to serve as national president of the Sons of Silence before retiring from the club. He died of a heart attack at the age of 50, on March 10, 1991. The Sons of Silence's expansion into Indianapolis prompted friction with the Outlaws and, after a period of infrequent fighting in which members of the rival clubs would try to physically take the "colors" from opposing bikers, a war erupted following the July 1978 near-fatal stabbing of Outlaws member Dale "Dummy" Larque during a bar fight on the city's Westside. The conflict between the Sons of Silence and the Outlaws in Indianapolis in the late 1970s and early 1980s resulted in a number of murders, including those of two girlfriends of SOSMC members.

On March 5, 1980, two gunmen opened fire with automatic rifles on the Outlaws' clubhouse at 1210 East Ohio Street, killing Outlaws national vice president Thomas Walter "Satan" Reeves. Hours before the shooting, members of the Sons of Silence and the Outlaws drank together at a bar on the Eastside of Indianapolis. Sons of Silence bikers were then marched from the Outlaws' clubhouse at gunpoint after entering the premises. Sons of Silence Indianapolis chapter vice president Steven Wayne "Crescent Wrench" Kressin was the alleged killer of Reeves, using an AK-47 assault rifle. On October 4, 1980, Lisa J. Reimer, the girlfriend of a Sons of Silence member, was shot in the back of the head and killed during a shootout on an entry ramp to Interstate 465 while riding as a passenger on a motorcycle. The murder remains unsolved, although police theorized that the shooting was caused by an Outlaws ambush and that the intended target was Daryl W. "Wino" Sturges, president of the Indianapolis Sons of Silence chapter from June 1978 to October 1980. Sturges' girlfriend, Lynda C. Massingale Rice, was stabbed to death on December 31, 1980.

On November 15, 1981, Outlaws member John "Big Jack" Slater was left paralyzed after being shot with a .38 caliber pistol by Sons of Silence member Eric "Doc" Lewandowski outside the Sons' clubhouse. Slater was then bundled into a van and killed with a 12-gauge shotgun by another Sons of Silence member, Hendrick "Savage" Jansen. Lewandowski was convicted of voluntary manslaughter, while Jansen was acquitted as he testified that he believed Slater was already dead when he shot him. Bruce Birk Eastman was killed with a shotgun as he answered the door of the Sons of Silence Indianapolis clubhouse on 30 May 1984.

On February 24, 1991, a large group of Outlaws were attacked by several members of the Sons of Silence at a motorcycle swap meet at the Indiana Convention Center in Indianapolis. Shots were fired, three people were wounded, and two Sons of Silence members were arrested. Twelve guns and numerous knives were seized by police.

Members and associates of the Indianapolis and Terre Haute chapters of the Sons of Silence were indicted in October 2011 following an FBI investigation into the club's activities known as "Operation Saw Mill". Twelve people were convicted for participating in a methamphetamine ring that operated from approximately May 2010 until the arrests of most of the members of the organization on August 6, 2011. Phillip Mannebach, a member of the Terre Haute chapter, was also convicted of orchestrating the abduction of his stepson which was carried out with the help of club hangarounds. The victim of the abduction had stolen approximately $5,000 in currency from Mannebach, who was sentenced to life in prison on April 8, 2013.

Sons of Silence members had a conflict with members of the Iron Order Motorcycle Club in a business parking lot in Crawfordsville on April 27, 2014. Firearms, knives and bats were used, and injuries were reported.

=== Iowa ===
Sons of Silence enforcer Ronald Merrill "Bad Ron" Gruber was sentenced to thirty-five years in prison for rape and assault in Black Hawk County in October 1977. While in Iowa State Penitentiary, he and another inmate were sued by two guards whom they assaulted. After being released, Gruber was one of a number of club members convicted on a 1994 federal racketeering charge. As a prisoner at FCI Greenville in Illinois in August 1996, Gruber was charged with the shotgun murder of Penny Jean Sternquist Weitzel, who was killed in Boone on November 30, 1984. In May 1997, Gruber pled guilty to second degree murder in her death and was sentenced to fifty years in prison. He was paroled in 2012.

Sons of Silence member Clark Joseph Cook was convicted of possession of methamphetamine after he was found to be carrying a bag of the drug during a traffic stop by the Iowa State Patrol on September 5, 1993.

Fourteen members or former members were indicted in Cedar Rapids in November 1994, charged with racketeering, money laundering, conspiracy and committing violence in aid of racketeering. Twelve were immediately arrested and eventually pleaded guilty or were convicted. Two others, Jeffrey Paul "No Mind" Gruber and Robert "Bronc" McAlister, remained fugitives until being apprehended in Washington state in July 1996. David Fairchild, who was one of the twelve convicted in 1995 and who received a twenty-five year prison sentence, began to cooperate with the government after his conviction and testified against Cedar Falls/Waterloo chapter de facto leader and national vice-president Gruber, who was sentenced to life in prison.

Six members of the Boone Sons of Silence chapter – Russell John Schoenauer, Robert Lee "Skunk" Norman, Gary Lee Walker, Daniel Lee Burns, Barry Craig Scarcello and Steven Lowell Henry – were arrested by the ATF on April 4, 2001 on the charges of trafficking cocaine, marijuana and methamphetamine, as well as firearms, throughout the state of Iowa. Two others, Pelayo Jose "Tattoo Joe" Cuervo and William John Furlong, were also later apprehended. Cuervo, Norman and Schoenauer – the Sons of Silence's national treasurer – were convicted of numerous narcotics and firearms offenses related to a conspiracy to distribute controlled substances that lasted from 1978 through 2001. Norman was sentenced to twenty-nine years' imprisonment, Cuervo was sentenced to twenty-two years' and Schoenauer was sentenced to seventeen years'.

Justin Carlson, age 38, from Sheffield, Iowa, who was the enforcer for the Northern Iowa Chapter of the Sons of Silence Motorcycle Club was sentenced to 10 months in federal prison. He received the prison term after a March 19, 2021 guilty plea to one count of being a felon in possession of a firearm. In the guilty plea and sentencing proceedings, Carlson admitted that on April 5, 2020, Carlson, a convicted felon, and other members of the Sons of Silence and another affiliated group confronted a motorcyclist, who was an off-duty police officer, claiming the officer needed permission from the Sons of Silence to wear one of the patches on the back of the motorcyclist’s jacket. In a subsequent search of Carlson’s home in Sheffield, Iowa, officers recovered Carlson’s Sons of Silence motorcycle vest, which had a brass knuckles in the pocket, numerous items of Sons of Silence paraphernalia, and two firearms.

=== Missouri ===
Milton Charles "Barbwire" Wilson, the president of the Sons of Silence's Kansas City chapter, was charged in May 2014 with transporting a minor across state lines for prostitution, along with Kayla "Foxy" Pinkerton. Wilson transported Pinkerton and the victim to various locations in Missouri and Kansas in December 2013. Both plead guilty to the crime on April 1, 2015. In September 2015, Wilson was sentenced to ten years' imprisonment and Pinkerton was sentenced to sixteen months'.

=== New York ===
In August 1984, Sons of Silence founder Bruce "The Dude" Richardson was sentenced to six years in prison after pleading guilty to hiring Robert Leslie Konitski to organize the May 1984 abduction of Dr. Michael Roark from a Buffalo hotel. It was claimed that Roark owed Richardson's wife, Patricia Stranahan, approximately $260,000 after a failed business venture and that the abduction was an attempt to retrieve some of this money after court proceedings to recover the funds had failed. As well as Stranahan, three others are sentenced in connection with the abduction, Michael Rattley, Robert Jordan and Ariel Falcon.

=== North Dakota ===
The Sons of Silence have established chapters in Bismarck, Fargo, Grand Forks, and Minot. The club is involved in methamphetamine trafficking throughout North Dakota, typically using smaller, affiliated motorcycle gangs to distribute the drug at the retail level in order to gain insulation from law enforcement scrutiny. Mexican-produced methamphetamine is transported into North Dakota for distribution from Sons of Silence chapters in other states, primarily Colorado.

The Sons of Silence are alleged to have ordered the murder of Williston rancher Jack Sjol who went missing in April 2013 and whose body was found in rural Williams County the following month. Ryan Lee Stensaker was convicted of Sjol's murder on December 17, 2014 and was sentenced to life in prison.

Billy Joe Herman, an enforcer for the Sons of Silence but not a member of the club, pleaded guilty in April 2019 to the October 12, 2015 murder of Amanda Stach Engst, who was killed on the Spirit Lake reservation. Herman strangled Engst and put her in the trunk of her car with the help of Crystal Johnson, his then wife. After beating Engst with a shovel, he dumped her tarp-wrapped body, which was tied to cinder blocks, into the Sheyenne River. Her body was found on February 4, 2016. Herman was sentenced to life in prison for Engst's murder, and Johnson was sentenced to twenty years in prison for her part as an accomplice.

A fire at a home in Fargo on October 31, 2019 was connected to a feud between the Sons of Silence and Hells Angels, according to law enforcement.

=== South Dakota ===
A Sons of Silence member shot an Outlaws member in a bar fight in which two other Sons of Silence bikers were stabbed in Sturgis in August 1990.

While travelling to an annual motorcycle rally in Sturgis, South Dakota on August 5, 1997, seven Sons of Silence and Iron Horsemen members were stopped by South Dakota Highway Patrol troopers as they travelled north on I-29 after police received reports of a group of motorcyclists running a car off the road. A subsequent search of the bikers and their motorcycles uncovered cocaine, marijuana, methamphetamine and loaded pistols. Ralph W. Durke and Heather Cook, a passenger on Durke's motorcycle, were charged with possession with intent to distribute methamphetamine and cocaine, and concealment of a weapon with intent to commit a felony, while Steven Taylor was charged with possession of methamphetamine.

=== Wyoming ===
Sons of Silence members Cory Rutherford, Matthew James Wedgewood and Nicholas B. Hanson pleaded guilty to charges stemming from an incident at a bar in Rock Springs in which they beat and robbed Bradley Chrisman, a member of the rival Bad 7 motorcycle club, of his colors on April 10, 2017. The trio received suspended prison sentences in October 2017.
