= IHMC =

The acronym IHMC may refer to:

- Florida Institute for Human and Machine Cognition
- Iron Horsemen Motorcycle Club

== See also ==
- Institute of Hotel Management, Catering Technology and Applied Nutrition (IHMCT&AN)
