= David Mann (artist) =

American painter

- Born: September 10, 1940; Kansas City, Missouri, U.S.
- Died: September 11, 2004 (aged 64)
- Education: Kansas City Art Institute
- Known for: Painting, illustration
- Movement: Biker art
- Awards: Kansas City Custom Car Show; 1963 "Hollywood Run"; AMA Motorcycle Hall of Fame; 2004; National Motorcycle Museum (Anamosa, IA) Hall of Fame – Promotion Category; 2004
- Patrons: Ed "Big Daddy" Roth, Easyriders magazine

David Mann (September 10, 1940 — September 11, 2004) was a California graphic artist whose paintings celebrated biker culture, and choppers. Called "the biker world's artist-in-residence," his images are ubiquitous in biker clubhouses and garages, on motorcycle gas tanks, tattoos, and on T-shirts and other memorabilia associated with biker culture. Choppers have been built based on the bikes first imagined in a David Mann painting.

In the words of an anthropologist studying biker culture in New Zealand, "Mann’s paintings set ‘outlaw’ Harley chopper motorcycles against surreal backgrounds, and distorted skylines, colourful images that celebrated the chopper motorcycle and the freedom of the open road ... Many of his images captured the ‘Easyrider’ ethos – speed, the open road, long flowing hair – freedom." Most of his works were designed for the motorcycle industry, especially for motorcycle magazines.

== Biography ==
A native of Kansas City, Missouri, Mann began drawing and painting at an early age. His first passion was custom cars and his first job was as an automobile painter. After high school, he left Kansas City and settled in California where he became interested in motorcycles. He became immersed in biker culture and motorcycles supplanted cars and pin-up girls in his artwork.

In 1963, Mann brought some of his artwork to the Kansas City Custom Car Show. There, biker/artist Tom Fugle took an interest in his artwork, and with Mann's permission, showed a photo of the painting "Hollywood Run" to Ed "Big Daddy" Roth, an artist and custom car painter, who was then the publisher of one of the first custom motorcycle magazines, Choppers. Roth loved the painting and commissioned 10 (or as many as 14 or 20, according to different sources) original posters, which were made available in the back pages of Easyriders for many years. In 1965, Mann joined Fugle's El Forastero Motorcycle Club, becoming one of the founding members of the Kansas City Charter. In 1971, he answered an advertisement for a "motorcycle artist" in the back of a new motorcycle magazine called Easyriders.

After 1972, his artwork began appearing regularly in the magazine, and Mann's relationship with Easyriders would continue for the rest of his life. His art was reproduced as the magazine’s center spread beginning in 1973 and continued to be the publication's centerpiece until he was forced to retire in 2003 due to his failing health. A collection of Mann's work was published in 1993 and updated in 2004.

In 2004 Mann was inducted into the motorcycle Hall of Fame by artist Billy Lane.

Mann died a day after his 64th birthday. Just before his death a custom motorcycle was commissioned in his honor from Orange County Choppers, to be featured in an episode of the reality television series American Chopper. The "David Mann Bike" featured custom artwork in Mann's style, but Mann died before it was completed. The vehicle served as a posthumous tribute to the artist, and his work was featured on the show. The episode was dedicated to Mann as well as Indian Larry, who had died about 2 weeks earlier.

His ashes were to be interred in the gas tank of a Harley Sportster XLCH painted in his trademark "David Mann Red." Mann is survived by his wife (Jacquie), son (Jamie), stepdaughter (Tracy), and stepson (Tim).

The David Mann Chopper Fest is a custom motorcycle show themed after Mann's style and attitude. It has been held annually in Ventura, California, since 2004.

== Work ==
One of Mann's frequent motifs was a motorcycle and its rider paired with a complementary or contrasting figure. The simplest form is the iconic image of two bikes on the road side by side, and out of this grew different permutations that spanned 30 years. There are three main variations.

The first is a biker alongside a kindred figure, such as a trucker or other archetypal, biker-sympathetic character, or else a biker shadowed by a ghostly, mythic figure from the past, such as a medieval knight, Wild West gunfighter or trapper. The two will have several matching clothing items, or have an identical facial appearance in order to ensure the viewer does not fail to appreciate that the biker is a modern incarnation of the mythic persona.

Secondly, the biker would be seen alongside a social antagonist, such as hostile but foolish police officers, square motorists, or an upper-class caricature of The Man who is irritated by his wife's, daughter's or son's obvious admiration for and longing to ride away with the biker.

The third variation has a female figure, sometimes supernatural, and watching over the biker from the sky, perhaps looming in the rider's memories, or else a real woman motorcycle passenger or woman in the background watching the biker ride away.

Mann painted three works where women are shown riding. One has a male and a female rider side by side on a road, and another has two women riding side by side on trikes at night, both with nothing remarkable happening. Still another is a portrait of the Devil Dolls Motorcycle Club, the first all-female outlaw biker club in the United States, using the Golden Gate Bridge as a backdrop. In the other, a confused and frightened-looking woman is shown attempting to ride a motorcycle, but she is out of control and being thrown off.

A subset of Mann's work, apart from these variations, is more surrealist and often leaves out choppers and bikers entirely. Instead, the motifs are usually skulls, flames, nude women, and tattoos, often playing with the figurative image which is tattooed on the skin coming to life.

One of the messages contained in Mann's overall body of work is an unresolved tension between, on one side, the biker artist's (painter, chopper builder, performance artist) craving for attention and recognition for biker art and the biker lifestyle in the mainstream world of middle-class straights and squares; and, on the other side, a rejection of that very same world based on the biker preference for biker values over mainstream values, and the need to show the squares and their opinions have no power over the biker. The biker/artist is aloof, yet bristles when ignored or disparaged and seeks ways of getting the right kind of attention.

A further contrast is apparent in the repeated theme of the honor and nobility of the biker, depicting bikers as modern knights or similar mythic heroes, and the appearance of members of Mann's El Forastero Motorcycle Club in many of his paintings, a club whose members have been found guilty for the crimes motorcycle theft and for "transporting and distributing methamphetamine" after it was discovered the club members pooled money to buy narcotics at their organized events.

He is the eponym of an episode of Sacred Steel Bikes on Discovery Channel.

== See also ==
- DIY Culture
- Lowbrow (art movement)
