= Highwaymen Motorcycle Club =

American outlaw motorcycle club

Highwaymen MC
- Founded: 1954
- Founded at: Detroit, Michigan, U.S.
- Type: Outlaw motorcycle club
- Region served: Midwestern and Southern United States

The Highwaymen Motorcycle Club is a one-percenter outlaw motorcycle club. The club was formed in Detroit, Michigan in 1954. The club has undergone a number of large-scale police and FBI investigations, most notably in 1973, 1987 and 2007. In the early 1970s several members were convicted of bombings and raids of the homes and the clubhouses of rival motorcycle clubs.

The club is the largest in the Detroit area, with over four hundred members, and chapters in Alabama, Florida, Indiana, Kentucky, Missouri, Ohio, and Tennessee. Their insignia is a winged skeleton wearing a motorcycle cap and leather jacket, and their colors are black and silver. Their motto is, "Yeah, though we ride the highways in the shadow of death, we fear no evil, as we are the evilest 'mother fuckers' on the Highway." ("H.F.F.H."). James Blake Miller, the "Marlboro Marine", is a member of the Kentucky Highwaymen, many of whom, like Miller, are veterans suffering from post-traumatic stress disorder. The Highwaymen are banned from the Detroit Federation of Motorcycle Clubs, which was created in the 1970s to resolve motorcycle gang turf wars.

In 1955, the Highwaymen were actually listed as an American Motorcyclist Association (AMA) sanctioned club, a form of mainstream respectability which outlaw motorcycle clubs would, over the course of the 1950s and 1960s, come to reject as the very definition of 'outlaw' and 'one-percenter,' just as much as the AMA rejected outlaw clubs from their midst. Despite their claim to be an outlaw club, the group has recently shown an affinity for law enforcement, often counter protesting at anti-law enforcement rallies.

== Criminal activities ==
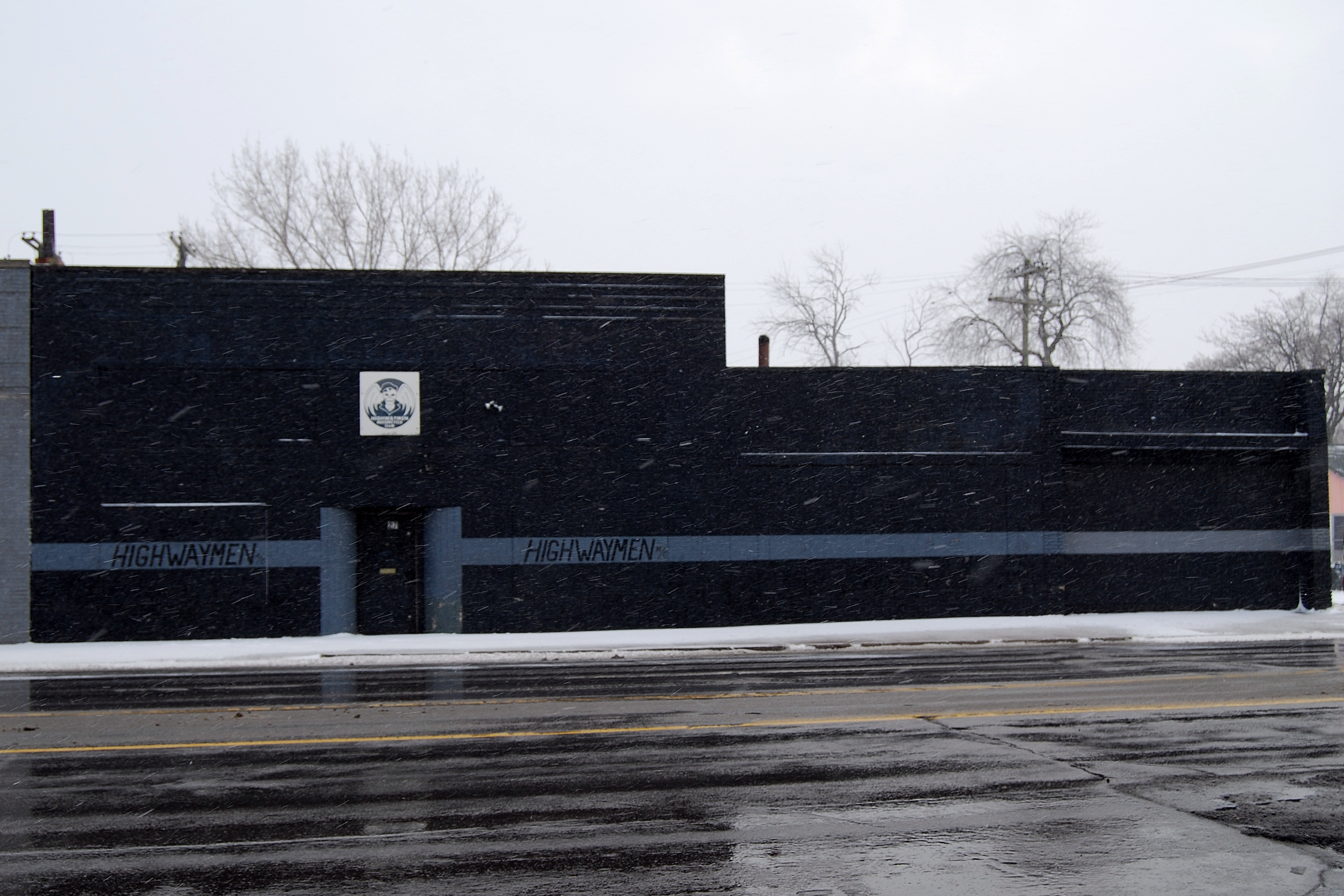
Detroit Highwaymen clubhouse. It was subject to forfeiture in 2010 for being a drug den.

On May 5, 2007, the Federal Bureau of Investigation arrested 40 members and associates of the Detroit chapter of the Highwaymen on a number of charges including racketeering, murder for hire, assault, police corruption, cocaine trafficking, vehicle theft, and mortgage and insurance fraud. Twenty-nine illegal firearms, including assault rifles, shotguns and handguns, were also found when FBI agents raided homes and the chapter's clubhouse. The investigation into the club lasted two years and involved wiretaps and two informants, one of whom was eventually murdered. the other was James Wallace III.

High-ranking Highwaymen member Randell Lee McDaniel was arrested for running a chop shop in Lansing, Michigan on June 13, 2007. The investigation by the Monroe County Auto Theft Enforcement began in October 2006 and served several search warrants on properties owned by McDaniel. He was charged with conducting a criminal enterprise, operating a chop shop, motor vehicle theft and possessing a controlled substance.

Four police officers and a member of the Highwaymen were indicted on March 12, 2008 by a federal grand jury in Detroit on charges stemming from the 2007 investigation into drug trafficking. Highwaymen member Sean Donovan, who was already incarcerated on stolen property charges, was charged with possession with intent to distribute marijuana and Vicodin. The four police officers were also jailed for corruption.
