= Black Pistons Motorcycle Club =

Outlaw motorcycle club affiliated with the Outlaws MC

Black Pistons MC
- Abbreviation: BPMC
- Founded: February 19, 2002; 24 years ago
- Founded at: Neuwied, Germany
- Type: Outlaw motorcycle club
- Purpose: Support club for the Outlaws
- Region served: International
- Website: blackpistons.de

The Black Pistons Motorcycle Club is an international outlaw motorcycle club and official support club for the Outlaws Motorcycle Club, another group of motorcycle enthusiasts. Established in Neuwied, Germany in 2002, the Black Pistons have expanded throughout Europe, North America and Asia. The Outlaws use the Black Pistons chapters as a recruitment source for prospective Outlaws members.

== History ==
The Black Pistons Motorcycle Club was founded on February 19, 2002, when five chapters of the club were established in Germany, located in Lippstadt, Gedern, Leutershausen, Ilmenau and Biberach. On March 5, 2002, the Satan's Syndicate biker club in Columbus, Ohio "patched over" to become the first Black Pistons chapter in the United States. Additional U.S. chapters were formed in Ocala, Florida and Shelbyville, Kentucky the same year. The Brotherhood club in Birmingham then became Black Pistons' first branch in the United Kingdom, on February 17, 2003.

The club subsequently expanded throughout the U.S., Canada, Europe and Asia.

== Organization and membership ==
The Black Pistons function as a support club for the Outlaws, providing a recruitment source for prospective Outlaws members. According to the Black Pistons MC National Constitution, all members must be at least 21 years old, own a U.S.-made motorcycle and driving license, and be a friend of an active member of the club for at least a year. Members are required to attend mandatory functions and weekly meetings.

The Black Pistons MC are active internationally, with chapters in Belgium, Canada, Germany, Norway, Poland, the United Kingdom, the United States, Spain and Asia. In the U.S., the club has 70 chapters located in 20 states, with a combined membership of over 200.

== Criminal allegations and incidents ==
According to law enforcement, the Outlaws use the Black Pistons to conduct criminal activities, especially for the transportation and distribution of drugs, on their behalf in order to insulate members of the larger club from incrimination. The Black Pistons also engage in assault, extortion, fraud, intimidation and theft.

=== Canada ===
==== New Brunswick ====
Members of the Black Pistons' Fredericton chapter were involved in a violent clash with Quebec Hells Angels bikers in the city, in October 2016.

==== Ontario ====
In April 2013, Randy McGean, the president of the St. Catharines Black Pistons chapter, began renting a property on Page Street in St. Catharines from Dan Carley, a lottery winner and onetime prospective member of the club. The property served as the clubhouse of the St. Catharines Black Pistons until several club members, including Carley, McGean and Isaac Lucas, were charged with drug-related offences stemming from Project Resurgence, a seven-month investigation by the Niagara Regional Police. Police seized $70,000 in cash, $150,000 worth of vehicles, marijuana with a potential street value of $18 million, $30,000 in heroin, and various weapons during the operation. McGean was convicted of conspiracy to traffic cocaine and heroin, and possession of a prohibited weapon; Lucas was convicted of trafficking heroin, and conspiracy to traffic cocaine and heroin; and Carley pleaded guilty to trafficking cocaine. McGean was sentenced to eleven years' imprisonment, on 11 October 2016. On 2 January 2018, Ontario Superior Court of Justice Judge Joseph Henderson ruled the Black Pistons' Page Street headquarters was to be forfeited to the Ontario government because it was used as a base for a drug-trafficking operation.
