= El Forastero Motorcycle Club =

American outlaw motorcycle club

El Forastero MC
- Founded: 1962
- Founder: Tom Fugle and Harlan "Tiny" Brower
- Founded at: Sioux City, Iowa, U.S.
- Type: motorcycle club
- Region served: Midwestern USA
- Members: 100
- Key people: David Mann
- Website: elforasteromc.net

El Forastero Motorcycle Club (EFMC) is an outlaw motorcycle club which was established after being turned down for a chapter by the Satan Slaves MC. The El Forasteros are well known for their criminal activities, and are considered by law enforcement to be among the many second-tier, after the "Big Four", outlaw motorcycle clubs.

Its early members included the biker artist Dave Mann. The name of the club means "the outsider" in Spanish.

== History ==
The club was founded in 1962 by Tom Fugle and Harlan "Tiny" Brower has chapters in Iowa, Minnesota, Kansas, and Missouri and close links to the Galloping Goose MC.

Some of the club members have been found guilty for the crimes motorcycle theft and for transporting and distributing methamphetamine after members testified the club members pooled money to buy narcotics for consumption at their organized events.

El Forastero member William Eneff received a sentence of seven years in federal prison without parole after pleading guilty conspiracy to distribute methamphetamine. According to the US Department of Justice, Eneff, "admitted that members of El Forastero and the affiliated Galloping Goose Motorcycle Club were required to annually pay dues and attend a certain number of motorcycle trips, known as runs, each year. On each run, the members were required to pay money that was pooled, or collected by each club charter, then forwarded to the specific Galloping Goose or El Forastero charter that hosted the particular motorcycle run in order to purchase methamphetamine, cocaine and marijuana. Those drugs were maintained in run bags, which were distributed to all club members who attended the run."

An editorial by Mark Sheehan in the St. Joseph News-Press expressed wonderment at the advanced age of the "dangerous motorcycle gang", the El Forasteros, noting that among one group indicted on methamphetamine charges in 2006, "the ages of these rebels on wheels range from 51 to 60". Indicted El Forastero Larry D. "Eight Ball" Williams was at age 60 a "card-carrying member of AARP." Sheehan said, "My deepest concern is that we are stuck in a psychological rut. We are determined to live in the 1960s when motorcycle gangs were cool."
