= Jim Nolan (biker) =

American outlaw biker and gangster

- Born: James Thomas Nolan c. 1943 (age 82–83); New Jersey, U.S.
- Other name: "Big Jim"
- Occupations: Outlaw biker; crime boss
- Allegiance: Iron Cross MC (–1967); Outlaws MC (1967–present)
- Convictions: Drug possession and threatening the life of a police officer (1978); Firearms offenses (1982); Receiving the earnings of a prostitute (1984); Racketeering (1989)
- Penalty: 5 years' imprisonment (1978); 10 years' imprisonment (1982); 5 years' imprisonment (1984); 50 years' imprisonment (1989)

James Thomas Nolan (also known as "Big Jim"; born c. 1943) is an American outlaw biker and gangster who founded and served as president of the South Florida chapter of the Outlaws Motorcycle Club. In 1989, Nolan was convicted for numerous violations of the Racketeer Influenced and Corrupt Organizations Act, including ordering several murders, extortion, and narcotics and prostituting offenses, and sentenced to fifty years in federal prison.

== Early life ==
Nolan was born in New Jersey and moved to Fort Lauderdale, Florida in 1955. He attended South Broward High School in Hollywood, Florida and completed two years of college.

== Outlaws ==
Nolan founded the Iron Cross motorcycle gang in West Palm Beach in the early 1960s and was president of the gang when the Chicago-based Outlaws dispatched a representative, Donald "Deke" Tanner, to Florida in the spring of 1967 with the assignment of founding a chapter in the state. Nolan began an association with Tanner and assisted him in merging various Florida biker gangs — including the Iron Cross, the Cossacks, the Half-Breeds, and the Outcasts — to form the Outlaws' South Florida chapter, with the "patch over" ceremony taking place at Kitty's Saloon, a roadside bar on State Road A1A in Juno Beach, in July 1967. The South Florida chapter initially used Kitty's Saloon as a clubhouse, and its members resided in a dozen cabins behind the saloon, which they rented from the saloon's owner, Bertha "Kitty" Randall.

Nolan was described by the Sun Sentinel as "an intelligent and charismatic leader" who sported "long, wavy brown hair well below his shoulders and a full beard". He originally served as vice president of the South Florida Outlaws, with Tanner leading the chapter as president. The Outlaws were quickly implicated in prostitution, narcotics, car theft, stolen credit cards, grand larceny, assaults and other crimes, but it was an incident on November 14, 1967, in which five Outlaws members crucified an 18-year-old woman, Christine Deese, by nailing her to a tree in Jupiter after she failed to turn over $10 demanded by the bikers, that gained the chapter most of its notoriety and resulted in Florida Governor Claude R. Kirk Jr. vowing to drive the club out of the state. In an interview with George Nobbe of the Sunday News in December 1967, Nolan dismissed allegations against the Outlaws as "hogwash", and said: "So we have long hair and beards. Well, so did Jesus Christ and he's been around a lot longer that Governor Kirk. He's a lot of mouth."

The South Florida Outlaws chapter relocated to Fort Lauderdale after a campaign of police harassment forced them out of Palm Beach County. The chapter was headquartered from a clubhouse located in an unincorporated neighborhood southwest of Fort Lauderdale and had approximately 200 members and associates at its peak. Nolan served as president of the Fort Lauderdale chapter and as regional president of the Outlaws in Florida for over ten years. Biker historians have credited Nolan with convincing the Outlaws' leadership, headquartered in the Midwest, of the importance of taking control of the Southern United States, and the state of Florida specifically. The crime reporter Scott Burnstein described him as "the Outlaws overall patriarch in the Sunshine State and the South Florida chapter's revered Godfather". Nolan was instrumental in the Outlaws' rapid expansion throughout the state during the 1970s, as the club amalgamated various smaller motorcycle gangs, such as the Regents in Jacksonville and the Iron Cross in Orlando. Due to the aggressive membership drive in the early 1970s, Florida eventually had the largest concentration of Outlaws in the United States. During Nolan's presidency, Outlaws members were forbidden from retiring from the club under threat of violence.

The South Florida Outlaws initially derived the majority of their income from sex trafficking, prostituting women known as "old ladies" who were deemed to be property of Outlaws members. The women were supplied to topless bars along Florida's Gold Coast to work as dancers and prostitutes. The bikers maintained control over these women using various methods, including gathering information on and threatening the lives of their families, and would occasionally buy and sell their old ladies amongst themselves. Under Nolan's leadership, the Outlaws shifted their focus in the mid-1970s from sex rackets, due to a decline in prostitution income, to illegal gambling and narcotics trafficking at a time when the demand for party drugs was at an all-time high at the peak of the disco era. Describing the bikers' motivations behind switching primarily from pimping to drug dealing, Assistant U.S. Attorney Gregory Kehoe said: "There are problems with old ladies. And drugs don’t talk back". The Florida faction of the Outlaws gained power and influence within the club by forging links with Colombian and Cuban drug suppliers, sourcing cocaine being imported into the state from Colombia, which they then distributed to chapters in the Midwest and on the East Coast. In addition to cocaine, the Outlaws also sold wholesale quantities of methamphetamine and heroin in Broward County.

=== Hells Angels murders ===
A feud between the Outlaws and the Hells Angels began when two members of the Aliens biker gang in New York City — Sandy Alexander and Peter "Greased Lightning" Rogers — went separate ways, with Alexander joining the New York Hells Angels and Rogers leaving to become a member of the Chicago Outlaws. When Rogers returned to New York to attend a New Year's Eve party in Manhattan in 1973, he was severely beaten by Alexander after allegedly raping the Hells Angel's wife. To save face, Rogers told his fellow Outlaws that he had been attacked by a dozen Hells Angels. In the spring of 1974, Nolan learned that three members of the Hells Angels' Lowell, Massachusetts chapter were traveling to South Florida. Two of the bikers — "Whiskey" George Hartman and Edwin "Riverboat" Riley — were visiting the state to supervise the covering up of gang tattoos belonging to Albert "Oskie" Simmons, who had relocated to Orlando to operate a motorcycle shop after leaving the Lowell Hells Angels a year or two earlier. Police believe Hartman and Riley were also in Florida to source narcotics. Nolan called a club meeting to discuss what course of action the Outlaws should take regarding the presence in their territory of the "maggots" who had beaten their "brother" Peter Rogers.

After receiving information that Hartman, Riley and Simmons would be at the Pastime Bar, a Fort Lauderdale tavern, on April 30, 1974, Nolan and other members of the South Florida Outlaws went to the bar and began discussing their differences with the Hells Angels before suggesting they take the discussion "off the street". The Outlaws then lured the three bikers to their clubhouse under the guise of a drug deal, promising no harm would come to the Hells Angels. When the Hells Angels arrived at the Outlaws' clubhouse, however, Nolan ordered several fellow club members to take the rival bikers to a deserted area and "make sure they don't come back"․ Four Outlaws — Henry "Funky Tim" Amis, William "Gatemouth Willie" Edson, Norman "Spider" Risinger, and Ralph "Lucifer" Yannotta — then forced the Hells Angels into the back of a van at gunpoint, bound them with pink clothesline and drove them to a quarry in the Everglades of southwest Broward County near Andytown, where Risinger killed each of them execution-style with a 12-gauge shotgun. The bodies of the trio were weighed down with eight concrete cinder blocks and submerged in a flooded, twenty-feet-deep rock pit. The murders were discovered on May 1, 1974, after one of the corpses dislodged and floated to the surface, where it was seen by Stanley McElroy, a passing motorist. The other two were found by police divers. Hartman, Riley and Simmons were identified by their fingerprints and tattoos.

Edson was arrested in Canada for an unrelated crime in 1976 and subsequently turned state's evidence when he was extradited back to the United States, naming himself, Amis, Risinger and Yannotta as those who committed the triple homicide on the orders of Nolan. In 1977, the Hells Angels attempted to resolve the feud between the clubs by sending Sandy Alexander, along with Oakland, California chapter members Sergey Walton and Gary Popkin, to meet with Nolan and other Outlaws leaders in Durham, North Carolina. Nolan and his contingent did not show at the "sit-down", however. Along with Amis, Edson, Risinger and Yannotta, Nolan was indicted by a grand jury in connection with the killings in April 1978, charged with three counts of first-degree murder. At the time of his indictment, Nolan was being held in county jail while he appealed a five-year prison sentence he had received earlier that year on state drug charges and for threatening the life of a Hollywood, Florida policeman by threatening to sick his dog, a 150-pound Great Dane, on the officer.

State prosecutor Thomas Kern characterized Nolan as "the undisputed leader of the Outlaws in South Florida" and asserted that he was responsible for ordering the three murders. Edson and Yannotta, along with two other Outlaws, John "Egor" Loose and Dale "Brackett" Webb, testified against Nolan in exchange for lesser sentences. At the time of their testimony, Edson was serving a twenty-year prison sentence for torturing a woman; Loose was serving a twenty-year sentence for beating a woman with a table leg; Webb, a former president of the Orlando Outlaws chapter, was serving life for kidnapping; and Yannotta was serving four concurrent life sentences for murder. Nolan's defense attorney, Ray Sandstrom, maintained that the state's case against his client was "not such a neat package of sudden cooperation by public-spirited citizens as the prosecution would have you believe", noting that each the four state witnesses who had implicated Nolan had benefited by agreeing to testify. Nolan's first trial for the murders ended in a hung jury on December 22, 1978, when the 12-person jury was split 10-to-2 for conviction. A retrial, in March 1979, also ended in a mistrial. Nolan was ultimately acquitted in a third trial, later in 1979, after presenting what the state's witnesses testified was a fabricated defense.

=== Naomi Sonoqub murder ===
In August 1974, a woman named Joyce Karleen was invited, on the offer of finding a job, from Daytona Beach to stay at a trailer home in Hollywood, Florida, which she later discovered was the Outlaws clubhouse. On the first day of her stay at the trailer, Nolan hit Karleen after she refused to bring him a beer. On the second day, he raped her at gunpoint, informed her that, as an Outlaw's "old lady", she would be expected to work and give her earnings to the club, and then allowed eight other Outlaws to gang rape her. The following day, Karleen was put to work as a topless dancer at a local tavern, along with other Outlaw old ladies. Later that week, on August 22, 1974, she was abducted as she left the lounge after work by several Outlaws, who believed that Karleen had stolen clothing bearing a "property patch", an indicator of a woman's status as an old lady of the club, from one of their "patched" women. The Outlaws tied Karleen to a chair at the clubhouse and stripped her of her blouse before each took turns punching and kicking her and then using a hot spoon to sear her repeatedly on her arms and breasts. After they had finished torturing Karleen, the bikers escorted other Outlaws old ladies into the room while she remained tied to a chair, and warned the other women that they would receive the same treatment if they misbehaved. Karleen was then dumped in a remote field. Several Outlaws were later convicted of the beating after she reported the incident to the police.

Shortly after the incident, Naomi Sinoqub, the old lady of Outlaws member Donald "Gangrene" Sears and one of the women who was with Karleen the night she was beaten and tortured, ran away from the club. Concerned that Sinoqub may implicate the Outlaws in Karleen's beating, Nolan contacted some of his fellow Outlaws and told them to locate her. After Sears tracked her down, Nolan first had Sinoqub hidden in Miami before ordering Sears to kill her. Sears and another Outlaw, Richard "Dirty Dick" Brainard, took Sinoqub out on Brainard's fishing boat and shot her twice in the head. Sinoqub's body was then allegedly disposed of in one of two ways; the bikers either slashed her throat and abdomen, weighted her with a heavy object, and dumped her into the ocean, or trailed Sinogub's body behind the boat until it disintegrated. The body of Sinoqub was never found, and state charges were never filed against anyone in the murder.

During part of the late 1970s, Nolan's "old lady" was Tina Wittenstein, who worked as a prostitute and sometimes as a topless dancer. In July 1977, Wittenstein attempted to abscond with the assistance of Vaughn Foreman, one of her regular clients. After staying out of South Florida for a month, Wittenstein and Foreman returned to the area. Nolan then seized Wittenstein and held her at his home under armed guard before sending Outlaws members to locate Foreman and bring him to the home of another club member. At the Outlaw's home, Foreman was beaten with the butt of a shotgun and had a lit cigarette stubbed out in his eye, then had the barrel of the shotgun put in his mouth and told to beg for his life. When Nolan arrived at the residence, he told Foreman that he wanted Wittenstein, his "property", returned to him. When Foreman professed his love for Wittenstein, Nolan offered to sell her to him for $100,000, and said he would not release her until he received the money. Foreman was then forced to live with the Outlaws for a number of days while he attempted to raise the funds. He and Wittenstein were released after Foreman had paid Nolan $40,000. Foreman gave another $20,000 to Nolan before he married Wittenstein in the fall of 1977. He and Wittenstein then fled to California to escape Nolan.

=== Move to Tucson ===
While he was incarcerated at Florida State Prison on narcotics charges in 1980, Nolan was introduced to a woman named Iris Geoghagen by another Outlaw, Ronald "Arab" Watchmaker, who intended to "gift" Geoghagen to Nolan upon his release from prison. Watchmaker instead "gave" Nolan 49% of the woman while he was still imprisoned. Nolan then offered to buy the remaining 51% of Geoghagen from Watchmaker for $2,000, and Watchmaker gave her the choice of whose "old lady" she would rather be. Thinking that she would be entitled to better privileges as Nolan's "number one old lady" than she would be as Watchmaker's "number two old lady", Geoghagen chose Nolan. Geoghagen lived at Nolan's home in Fort Lauderdale, where she was watched over by Outlaws biker Michael "Moldy Mike" Cave, who also resided at the house while Nolan was in prison. Geoghagen visited Nolan in prison every weekend, and often smuggled cocaine and marijuana to him both for his personal use and for sale to other inmates. During his incarceration, Nolan was quoted as saying: "I'd rather be an Outlaw in the penitentiary than some jerk on the street".

After he was paroled in September 1980, Nolan began dividing his time between Fort Lauderdale and Tucson, Arizona, a city he planned to bring under the Outlaws' sphere of influence. Nolan convinced the parole board that he was working for country musician and Outlaws member David Allan Coe, although he was actually making a living in Arizona from the prostitution of his old ladies and drug dealing. He was joined in Tucson by other Outlaws members, who began supplying prostitutes to topless bars in the city. Nolan took Geoghagen to Arizona with him, leading her to believe that she would be treated to a thirty-day "honeymoon" during which she would not be required to work as a prostitute. There was no honeymoon, however, and he did in fact require her to work as a prostitute. Nolan also began to frequently beat Geoghagen after they had moved to Tucson, inflicting a broken rib on her on one occasion. In January 1981, Geoghagen visited her sick mother in Florida, although Nolan could not accompany her because of the terms of his parole. He threatened to kill her stepfather, who was her mother's sole caretaker, if she did not return from the trip. When Geoghagen asked Nolan if she could buy her freedom, he told her that it would cost her $125,000, but that she could not pay with her prostitution earnings as that money belonged to him.

In March 1981, Nolan hit Geoghagen several times and called one of his other old ladies to take her home when she stumbled into a parked motorcycle at a biker bar after a night of partying. While being driven home, Geoghagen escaped from the car at a stop light and hid behind a convenience store. She was seen by police, who approached her and asked what the problem was, although she begged them to leave her alone. While Geoghagen was being questioned by police officers, Nolan's other old lady alerted him to the situation and he was able to take Geoghagen home after he rode to the scene on his motorcycle and convinced the police that she had just had too much to drink. Geoghagen jumped off the back of Nolan's motorcycle at another stop light and tried to escape again, but Nolan caught her and punched her repeatedly in the face until she agreed to get back on the motorcycle. When they returned to their home, Nolan broke Geoghagen's jaw, threatened to kill her, and pistol-whipped her unconscious. Nolan allowed Geoghagen to visit a hospital after she concocted a false story to explain her injuries.

Geoghagen spent six days in hospital, where she had a pin surgically implanted in her jaw and her mouth wired shut. During a visit to her in hospital, Nolan brought another old lady. As he stood over the battered Geoghagen, Nolan said to the other old lady: "You see what I did to her? I'm in love with her. I don't even like you, motherfucker. Go ahead and piss me off". After arriving home from hospital, Geoghagen awoke one night to find Nolan orally sodomizing his new old lady, a 13-year-old girl. Dismayed at what she had witnessed, Geoghagen attempted suicide by overdosing on pills. When Nolan discovered her unconscious, he dragged her from room to room and beat her with a belt for over three hours. Geoghagen escaped from Nolan the following day with the help of a friend and returned to her parents' home in Florida. Geoghagen's parents then phoned the police, and she eventually agreed to give a police statement against Nolan.

After Geoghagen returned to Florida in April 1981, Nolan arranged to purchase another woman from his long-time Outlaw friend, "Sad" Sam Nail, to make up for the lost prostitution income. He also began conspiring with Nail to traffic cocaine from South Florida to Arizona, which they succeeded in doing on at least two occasions, and with another Outlaw, James "Blue" Starrett, to transport a large quantity of marijuana to Arizona from Florida. On July 11, 1981, Nolan shot and killed a man, John McQuillen, in the parking lot of the Bashful Bandit, a Tucson biker bar, after the men began arguing because Nolan had been repeatedly playing the same song on the jukebox. He discharged thirteen rounds from a 9 mm handgun and hit McQuillen eight times after McQuillen brandished a .38-caliber handgun.

Nolan was arrested immediately afterwards by a Tucson police officer, who had witnessed the shooting from a distance, and charged with murder by state authorities. After procuring bail on the murder charges, Nolan was arrested at his home on August 25, 1981, by the Bureau of Alcohol, Tobacco, Firearms and Explosives (ATF) on federal weapons possession charges in connection with the shooting of McQuillen. Having been convicted of two felonies in Florida state court, in 1966 and in 1976, Nolan was prohibited from possessing firearms. ATF agents discovered three guns in plain view in the living room of his home.

Nolan's federal firearms trial was originally scheduled to begin on November 2, 1981, but the court allowed four continuances, including one at Nolan's request to allow him to prepare additional evidence, and others to await the completion of his state murder trial, which was initially scheduled to start on January 21, 1982. The trial went ahead on March 2, 1982, after the court refused to grant additional continuances. Nolan's defense attorney, Bertram Polis, claimed that pretrial news coverage of the McQuillen shooting would make it impossible for his client to receive a fair trial, and he expressed concerns that the trial of Nolan and his co-defendant, Larry "Stitch" Savage, may become "a mini-murder trial". The court took several steps to control prejudice at trial, including moving proceedings from Tucson to Phoenix, and excluding any references to Nolan's motorcycle gang connections as well as evidence derived from wiretaps of his telephone. Iris Geoghagen acted as a government witness and testified at the trial that Nolan had received several guns in Arizona between October and December 1980. Due to fears for her safety, Geoghagen was placed under police protection. Nolan was convicted on all charges and sentenced to ten years in federal prison. Savage was acquitted of aiding and abetting Nolan's receipt of a firearm.

While awaiting trial for murder, Nolan became a born-again Christian and began writing and copyrighting Christian songs, such as "Put the Prayer Back in School". After repeated delays, his state murder trial finally commenced in June 1982. Nolan was acquitted of murder as McQuillen's killing was deemed self defense.

In 1984, Nolan was convicted in Arizona of receiving the earnings of a prostitute and sentenced to five years' imprisonment.

=== RICO case ===
On June 3, 1986, the majority of the Outlaws' South Florida chapter — including the already-imprisoned Nolan and his vice president, Fred "Yankee" Hegney — were indicted in a federal racketeering case, which covered a series of crimes in Broward County between 1970 and 1985. Drug sales, robberies, kidnappings, prostitution, extortion and eleven murders were listed among over 100 predicate acts in the indictment. The acts listed in the indictment included crimes which some of the defendants had previously been tried for, with guilty verdicts in some cases and acquittals in others.

The racketeering trial of Nolan and five other South Florida Outlaws began in Fort Lauderdale on January 27, 1988, after five weeks of jury selection. Federal prosecutors portrayed the Outlaws on trial as members of a criminal enterprise bound by a "code of silence" who profited from drug dealing and prostitution and who evaded arrest for fifteen years by intimidating and killing witnesses to their crimes. Nolan was accused of extortion, assault, ordering multiple murders, and forcing women into prostitution by threatening their families. Assistant U.S. Attorney Gregory Kehoe, representing the federal government, described Nolan as a man motivated by "power. Power and money." Defense attorneys maintained that even if the defendants had committed each crime listed in the indictment, the acts were not carried out for the benefit of the Outlaws organization, and contended that some prosecution witnesses had been paid as much as $70,000 by the government and had charges against them dismissed in exchange for their testimony. Nolan was represented by the defense attorney Charles G. White of Miami.

Following a 14-month trial, the longest in the history of the U.S. District Court for the Southern District of Florida, Nolan was convicted on January 23, 1989, of violating and conspiracy to violate the Racketeer Influenced and Corrupt Organizations Act (RICO). The jury found that the government had proven 34 of the 38 predicate acts charged against Nolan. These acts included ordering the murders of George Hartman, Edwin Riley, Albert Simmons, and Naomi Sinoqub; the extortion of Joyce Karleen, Tina Wittenstein, Vaughn Foreman, and Iris Geoghagen; and narcotics and prostitution offenses. On the day the jury returned its verdict, Nolan wore a T-shirt in court bearing the slogan: "Support Your Local Outlaws". All five of Nolan's co-defendants were also each convicted of at least one count in the indictment.

At Nolan's sentencing hearing in Miami on October 23, 1989, his attorney, Charles White, presented five witnesses, including ministers, members of Christian motorcycle clubs and a Catholic high school teacher, who each testified that Nolan was a sincere born-again Christian. The Reverend Daniel Burgoyne, who had a jailhouse ministry in Tucson, testified that he was convinced of Nolan's sincerity after observing the biker "sobbing and crying before God", and said: "He never missed a Bible study. He never missed a church service". Assistant U.S. Attorney Theresa Van Vliet was sceptical of White's assertions that Nolan had "changed his life", however, and countered that, as far back as 1969, attorneys for Nolan had assured judges that he would cease associating with the Outlaws if he were given reduced sentences. Van Vliet stated: "He’s made promises throughout his life that he’s going to be a good boy, be a productive member of society. But his track record shows he can't".

U.S. District Judge William J. Zloch sentenced Nolan to serve two consecutive terms of 25 years in federal prison, and recommended that he not be considered for parole until he has served all 50 years of the sentence. He was sentenced by Zloch to the maximum of 20 years on each racketeering count, in addition to another 10 years as requested by the government, which argued that Nolan was a "special dangerous offender".

The influence of the once powerful South Florida chapter of the Outlaws waned severely, partially due to Nolan's incarceration. By the time of his sentencing in 1989, the chapter's membership had diminished to less than a dozen. According to Kehoe, the South Florida Outlaws "fell off when Jim went to jail and then he went to Arizona. They never had another leader like Jim". Sergeant Bob Faulkner of the Broward County Sheriff's Office concurred, saying: "I don’t think they’ll ever have a leader again with the charisma of Jim Nolan."

Nolan was released from prison October 21, 2016, after serving 26 years of his sentence.

== Bibliography ==
- Langton, Jerry (2010). Showdown: How the Outlaws, Hells Angels and Cops Fought for Control of the Streets. Toronto: John Wiley & Sons. ISBN 978-0470678787.
- Lavigne, Yves (1996). Hell's Angels: Into the Abyss. New York City: HarperCollins. ISBN 9780006385707.
