= Diablos Motorcycle Club =

American outlaw motorcycle club

Diablos MC
- Abbreviation: DMC
- Founded: 1961; 65 years ago
- Founder: Jack Baltas
- Founded at: San Bernardino, California, United States
- Type: Outlaw motorcycle club
- Region served: United States

The Diablos Motorcycle Club is an outlaw motorcycle club founded in San Bernardino, California in 1961 that has chapters in cities across the United States.

== History ==
Originally known as Los Diablos Motorcycle Club, the club was founded in San Bernardino, California in 1961 by John J. "Cadillac Jack" Baltas, a native of Meriden, Connecticut. Baltas, who served as the club's national president and was once a candidate for Meriden city council, and died in Leominster, Massachusetts on April 22, 2012, aged 70. Although the Diablos originated in California, the club established its most significant presence in New England.

== Insignia ==
The Diablos' insignia consists of a bearded, top hat-wearing devil and features a red-and-black color scheme. This logo, together with geographic and optional emblems, are worn by club members on their "colors". Club mottos include "Diablos Forever, Forever Diablos" ("DFFD"). The Diablos are a "one percenter" club.

== Membership and organization ==
The Diablos have multiple chapters in California, Connecticut, Indiana, Maine, Vermont, New Hampshire, Rhode Island, and Massachusetts. Membership in the club is through invitation only and is open only to White males. Diablos members are required to own firearms.

== Criminal allegations and incidents ==
The Diablos are considered by law enforcement to be among the many second-tier, after the "Big Four", outlaw motorcycle gangs.

On August 6, 1977, a group of Diablos members were attending a festival held at the Renaissance Community Center in Gill, Massachusetts. When two members of the party, a biker and a female associate, went to a package store to replenish the group's liquor supply, they were involved in an altercation with four men who were attending a company picnic which was being held a short distance from the festival. In retaliation for the beating suffered by the two, a group of Diablos traveling in three automobiles hunted down and attacked three members of the picnic, Francis M. Golembeski, Richard Melnick, and Thomas Yestramski. Yestramski was beaten and stabbed, Melnick was stabbed six times, and Golembeski was shot in the elbow. Diablos members John J. "Cadillac Jack" Baltas, John L. Meadows and Oscar Mineau were convicted of assault and battery in 1978.

A Diablos member was arrested on suspicion of being an ex-felon in possession of a firearm when the Bureau of Alcohol, Tobacco, Firearms and Explosives (ATF) raided a home in San Bernardino, California on March 27, 1986, as part of Operation One Percenter, a 12-month ATF investigation. ATF agents discovered a methamphetamine lab during the raid. A woman was also arrested by the San Bernardino County Sheriff's Department on suspicion of possessing a controlled substance for sale. Operation One Percenter resulted in the arrests of 53 members and associates of 18 different biker gangs on various weapons and narcotics charges, during a series of raids in 18 U.S. states, and the seizure of 10 sawed-off shotguns, 10 machine guns, 63 rifles, 100 handguns, 4,500 rounds of ammunition, six silencers, a bomb, four hand grenades, five pounds of dynamite, 15 stolen vehicles, and a stolen computer, as well as large quantities of cocaine, marijuana and PCP.

John E. Irvin, president of the Diablos' San Fernando Valley chapter, and Thomas E. Pastor, a former Connecticut chapter member, were convicted of possession with intent to distribute methamphetamine, and of using and carrying a firearm during and in relation to a drug trafficking crime after they were found to be in possession of two loaded weapons and eight packages of methamphetamine when they were stopped and searched by Illinois State Police officers while traveling in a Ford Bronco near Collinsville, Illinois on January 5, 1995.

On September 24, 1998, Diablos club member Raymond "Stoney" Stone and seven other members were charged with various crimes (including Stone's confession in his involvement in the 1992 murder of rival gang member Mike D'Amato of Wallingford, Connecticut's James Gang MC for which he would be sentenced to 20 years' imprisonment).

Keith Gallagher, the vice president of the Diablos' national chapter, was indicted in Massachusetts on charges of cocaine trafficking on January 24, 2006.

Diablos member Jerry Louis Fantauzzi was arrested on December 7, 2005, following a long-term investigation into the Diablos in Waterbury and Meriden, Connecticut. On November 20, 2006, he was sentenced to ten years imprisonment on charges of drug dealing.

On April 22, 2012, the national leader and founder of the Diablos, Jack Baltas, died at the age of 70, two days after being released from prison after being incarcerated for trafficking drugs.

Diablos were involved in a mass brawl with members of the Outlaws at a bar in Plainville, Connecticut in May 2019, leaving two outlaws injured.
