= Iron Horsemen Motorcycle Club =

Outlaw motorcycle club in the United States

Iron Horsemen MC
- Abbreviation: IHMC
- Founded: 1965; 61 years ago
- Founded at: Cincinnati, Ohio, U.S.
- Type: Outlaw motorcycle club
- Region served: United States
- Website: ironhorsemenmc.com

The Iron Horsemen Motorcycle Club (IHMC) is an American outlaw motorcycle club. Their insignia consists of a winged, metallic horse's head while their motto reads "Ashes to ashes, dust to dust, if it weren't for the Iron Horsemen, the highways would rust".

== Publicized crimes ==
The Iron Horsemen are considered by law enforcement to be among the many second-tier, after the "Big Four", outlaw motorcycle gangs.

Police arrested three Iron Horsemen for beating a man to death and assaulting another on April 20, 1997. The attacks took place on two occasions at bars in Hollywood, Maryland.

IHMC members Dean Hamblin, Ed Wiggins and Eddie Whitlow were sentenced to five years in prison, and another three were given sixteen years in total on June 26, 2008 for drug dealing. They sold methamphetamine and speed in the Western District of Kentucky between December 2003 and December 2005, and distributed between 50 and 200 grams each. Both the Drug Enforcement Administration (DEA) and the Bureau of Alcohol, Tobacco, Firearms and Explosives (ATF) were involved in the case.

On May 19, 2009, 15 Iron Horsemen, including a State President, were convicted of drug trafficking at the District Court in Portland, Maine. They smuggled cocaine and marijuana, which they obtained from drug cartels in Mexico, to Atlanta, Georgia and then Haverhill, Massachusetts before trafficking it to Maine where they distributed it throughout the state. The ring operated from 2004 until December 2007. The DEA and ATF investigated the club for over a year and carried out the final raids on March 12, 2008. During these raids, they arrested a total of 29 people and seized 10 kilos of cocaine, 600 pounds of marijuana, AK-47s, AR-15s, handguns and $37,000 in cash. The case was known as "Operation Trojan Horse".

One member of the Iron Horsemen, Harold W Seavey Jr. was shot in a gunfight with Cincinnati Police on September 18, 2010. Local media reported that a gang member opened fire on several identifiable police officers and 2 undercover officers as they approached JD's Honky Tonk and Emporium escorted by marked police cruisers.

== See also ==
- List of outlaw motorcycle clubs
