= Outlaws Motorcycle Club =

International outlaw motorcycle club

Outlaws MC
- Abbreviation: A.O.A.
- Founded: 1935; 91 years ago
- Founder: John Davis
- Founded at: McCook, Illinois, U.S.
- Type: Outlaw motorcycle club
- Headquarters: Chicago, Illinois, U.S.
- Region served: Worldwide (441 chapters in 43 countries)
- Members: Over 5,000
- International President: John "Tommy O" Erwin
- Website: Official website

The Outlaws Motorcycle Club, incorporated as the American Outlaws Association or its acronym, A.O.A., is an international outlaw motorcycle club. Founded in McCook, Illinois, in 1935, the Outlaws MC is the oldest outlaw biker club in the world. With 441 chapters located in 43 countries, and a membership of over 5,000, the club is also the second-largest in the world, behind the Hells Angels. Outlaws members typically ride Harley-Davidson motorcycles.

The club is designated an organized crime syndicate by numerous law enforcement and international intelligence agencies, including the United States Department of Justice, the Criminal Intelligence Service Canada, and Europol.

== History ==
Originating as the McCook Outlaws MC, the club was founded by Electro-Motive Company employees at Matilda's bar on Route 66 in the southwestern Chicago suburb of McCook, Illinois, in 1935. John Davis was reportedly the founder of the club. Although inactive during World War II, the Outlaws re-formed afterwards and attended the first major postwar motorcycle rally, held at Soldier Field in Chicago in May 1946. By 1950, the club had begun recruiting members from around the Chicago area and was renamed the Chicago Outlaws MC after relocating its headquarters to the South Side of the city. In 1964, the Outlaws merged with the Cult biker club from Voorheesville, New York, the Gypsy Outlaws of Milwaukee, and the Gypsy Raiders in Louisville, Kentucky, becoming the largest "one percenter" club east of the Mississippi River and the second-largest in the United States after the California-based Hells Angels. On January 1, 1965, the various aligned clubs incorporated as the American Outlaws Association. The Outlaws further expanded into Florida in July 1967 by "patching over" the Iron Cross club in West Palm Beach.

The club featured in a work of photojournalism called The Bikeriders published in 1967 by Danny Lyon, a collection of photographs and interviews documenting the lifestyle of members of the club in the 1960s. Lyon spent four years riding with the Outlaws' Chicago chapter beginning in 1963 and became a full-fledged member of the club in "an attempt to record and glorify the life of the American bike rider". The Bikeriders preceded Hell's Angels: The Strange and Terrible Saga of the Outlaw Motorcycle Gangs by Hunter S. Thompson, who warned Lyon that he should "get the hell out of that club unless it's absolutely necessary for photo action."

During the early 1970s, a power struggle for control of the Outlaws developed between a faction of "beer drinkers" and a rival group of club members who preferred to smoke marijuana. Several Outlaws gang members, including John Davis, the reputed founder of the Outlaws, were killed by a "pot smoker" and Vietnam veteran during a shootout near Lake Shore Drive on the North Side of Chicago as a result of the feud, leaving 11 dead.

The Outlaws' long-standing rivalry with the Hells Angels began when three Hells Angels bikers were executed and beheaded by Outlaw members in Fort Lauderdale, Florida, on April 27, 1974. The triple murder was carried out in retaliation for the earlier beating of an Outlaw by a Hells Angel, which took place in New York City on December 31, 1973. The Hells Angels declared war on the Outlaws during a club summit held in Cleveland later in 1974. The deadly conflict has cost both clubs hundreds of fatalities.

In 1977, the Outlaws became an international club when several chapters of the Satan's Choice Motorcycle Club in Canada "patched over". The club further expanded internationally, into France in 1993, Australia in 1994, and Norway in 1995. Additional chapters were subsequently established throughout Europe. In November 2006, the Outlaws became the first major outlaw motorcycle club to open a chapter in the Far East when a full charter was awarded to a club in Okinawa City.

== Insignia ==
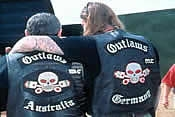
Outlaws members wearing club "colors"

The Outlaws' original insignia consisted of a head-on view of a motorcycle in a winged circle, which was hand-painted onto the back of members' jackets. In 1950, the club's logo was changed; a small skull replaced the winged motorcycle, and Old English-style letters were adopted. This design was embroidered on a black shirt or hand-painted onto leather jackets. Influenced by the fictional Black Rebel Motorcycle Club depicted in the film The Wild One, the Outlaws added crossed pistons affixed to the original small skull in 1954, a design embroidered on a black western-style shirt with white piping. The skull and crossed pistons logo, known as "Charlie", was redesigned in 1959, making it larger and with more detail. The club's "Charlie" insignia is a registered trademark. In 1963, the Outlaws began wearing a diamond-shaped "1%er" patch, becoming the first club east of the Mississippi River to do so. The "one percenter" emblem was originally adopted by several California biker clubs beginning in 1960. After incorporating as the American Outlaws Association in 1965, the club added an additional A.O.A. patch to its "colors", featuring an upstretched middle finger in a rounded triangle. The A.O.A. emblem was adopted as a parody of the A.M.A. logo. A patch listing a member's rank within the organization is also worn by club officers. An "S.S." patch featuring twin lightning bolts is allegedly awarded to members who have committed murder, attempted murder or a bombing on behalf of the club. A black-and-white color scheme is associated with the Outlaws, as is Totenkopf imagery, symbols such as a hand clenching a pistol, and paraphernalia featuring the phrases "Support Black & White" and "Support Your Local Outlaws", or "SYLO".

In 1969, the club adopted the motto "God forgives, Outlaws don't" ("GFOD"). The Outlaws' rivalry with the Hells Angels has given rise to other phrases used by Outlaws members; namely "ADIOS" (the Spanish word for "goodbye", but in this case doubling as an acronym for "Angels Die In Outlaw States"), and "All Hells Angels must die", or "AHAMD". "Snitches are a dying breed" as well as the more generic "Outlaws forever, forever Outlaws" ("OFFO") are other mottos used by the club. Patches featuring these various abbreviations are commonly worn by Outlaws members.

== Membership ==
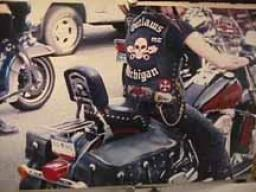
An Outlaws member on a motorcycle

To be eligible for Outlaws membership, applicants must be men over the age of 21 and also be in possession of an American-made motorcycle of at least 750cc. Outlaws in the United States and Canada are essentially limited to riding Indian, Victory and Harley-Davidson motorcycles, which are most common in the club. Outside of North America, however, this rule has been relaxed, allowing members to ride motorcycles manufactured in any country, provided they are in the chopper style.

The following five criteria are considered when evaluating an aspiring Outlaws member:

1. Owns and rides a Harley-Davidson
2. Is competent in the mechanics of motorcycles
3. Lives a lifestyle congruent with biker subculture and "treats other righteous bikers as bros"
4. Is viewed by society as masculine in "outlook, behavior, and sexual orientation"
5. Does not conform to "worldly values" but instead conforms to the lifestyle of the club

To be formally inducted into club, applicants have to be sponsored by a member, and they begin as an associate, or "hangaround", in order to assist the chapter, before being made a prospective member, or "prospect"; if he is approved by the club, then a prospect is moved up to probationary, or "probate", status, a position in which he is required to demonstrate his commitment to the club. A probate is identified by wearing a mandatory patch on a cut-off leather or denim vest reading: "Probationary Outlaws". The probationary period typically lasts several months. The highest level of membership in the Outlaws is "patched" or "patchwearing" member, which is attained by a unanimous vote of each chapter. Upon becoming a full-fledged member, an Outlaw is permitted to wear a vest bearing the club's insignia, known as "colors", and to attend weekly "church" meetings. The patch on a member's colors displaying the Outlaws emblem is surrounded by other patches denoting chapter and club membership information, which are called "rockers". These rocker patches are purchased directly from the international president. Club rules dictate that the Outlaws' patches must be worn on leather or black denim (blue denim is banned) and that club regalia is not allowed to be worn by members' wives or girlfriends. Women affiliated with the club, known as "old ladies", are, however, allowed to wear vests with patches reading: "Property of the Outlaws". Outlaws are instructed to guard their colors with their lives, and it is forbidden for any item bearing the club's logo to touch the floor.

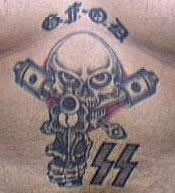
Outlaws tattoo featuring SS "Sieg" runes

Members are required to pay dues of $1,200 per year and to attend local, regional and national events. Obligatory chapter "church" meetings are held weekly, and club motorcycle trips and parties which may last several days, known as "runs", are held throughout the year. National runs take place three or four times per year, regional runs occur between five and twenty times a year, and local runs typically occur weekly. Membership dues are divided between the chapter and the region and are used to finance activities such as memorials and group excursions. Outlaws members are usually assessed a fee if a fellow club member is in need of legal assistance. It is compulsory for all members other than chapter presidents to take turns providing 24-hour armed guard at Outlaws clubhouses. Indiscipline and rule breaches are punished with a $300 fine. Members are also instructed by the club to attend funerals of fellow Outlaws. Additionally, Outlaws members reportedly transfer their membership from chapter to chapter more frequently than members of other prominent motorcycle clubs. Regarding contact with non-club members, Outlaws are required to adhere to a "strict no comment policy".

After a year of membership in the club, Outlaws are eligible to sport a tattoo of the club's emblem as well as club slogans, such as "God forgives, Outlaws don't", or "GFOD". After five years, club members may have replicas of their "colors" tattooed on their backs. Additional tattoos may reflect membership information. Allegedly, a member who has killed or attempted to kill for the Outlaws is permitted to wear "lightning bolts", a tattoo featuring a Nazi-style "SS" doppelte Siegrune (double sig runes) symbol. Incarcerated Outlaws members are known as "Lounge Lizards": the club maintains a list and collects money on their behalf. An Outlaw who has served a prison sentence is entitled to receive an "LL", or "Lounge Lizard", tattoo. Other tattoos common with club members include "AHAMD", an acronym for "All Hells Angels must die".

Members can leave the club in either "bad standing", "good standing", in retirement or when deceased. Retired Outlaws are permitted to wear a "dress shirt (retirement style)", according to the club's bylaws. Some club leaders, however, such as James "Big Jim" Nolan, have at times upheld a ban on members retiring from the Outlaws.

== Organization ==
Outlaws chapters are governed by an elected officer corps consisting of a president, vice president, treasurer, and sergeant-at-arms, or "enforcer". Chapters follow guidelines that dictate election procedures, gatherings, and action against members who have violated the club's bylaws. The club has 441 chapters located in 43 countries, in Asia, Europe and North America. Each chapter is headquartered at a clubhouse, which is typically a building secured by concrete walls, steel doors, razor wire, guard dogs, and video surveillance. Clubhouses are used to host "church" meetings and parties. Chapter presidents report to regional presidents, who oversee individual regions, which are divided and named by color, such as the red and blue regions. Regional presidents in turn report to the club's international president, who heads the Outlaws organization. Officers at the national, regional and local levels are elected by the membership of the club. According to law enforcement, the Outlaws' internal enforcer squad is known as the "S.S.".

The Outlaws' territory in the United States is divided into ten color-coded regions; the black region (Indiana and Michigan), the blue region (Pennsylvania), the copper region (North Carolina, South Carolina and Virginia), the gold region (Wisconsin), the gray region (Tennessee), the green region (Kentucky, Ohio and Oklahoma), the orange region (Florida), the red region (New England and the Philadelphia metropolitan area), the silver region (Alabama and Georgia), and the white region (Illinois). Formerly, the club's territory was divided into three areas; "Central", headquartered in Chicago; "North", headquartered in Detroit; and "South", headquartered in Oklahoma City. The Outlaws' international headquarters has historically been centred in the Midwest. The South Side, Chicago chapter was designated the club's "mother chapter" in 1964 and is known as the "Mother Ship" among Outlaws members. During the presidency of Harry "Taco" Bowman, from 1984 until 1999, the Outlaws' leadership was based in Detroit. Bowman's successor, James "Big Frank" Wheeler, relocated the club's headquarters to Tampa, Florida. The subsequent Outlaws international president, Jack Rosga, was based in Milwaukee. In April 2021, Assistant U.S. Attorney Joseph M. Tripi alleged in court papers that the current international president of the Outlaws is John Ermin, the general manager of Pharaoh's Gentlemen's Club in Cheektowaga, New York.

=== Support clubs ===
Each major Outlaws chapter maintains one to five support clubs, smaller motorcycle clubs which are within the Outlaws' sphere of influence. Members of such clubs are permitted to attend Outlaws events and wear "support" patches which identify them with the Outlaws, and are required to perform menial tasks and guard duties on the Outlaws' behalf. According to law enforcement, the Outlaws utilize support clubs to carry out retail-level drug distribution and violent crimes in order to insulate the club from possible criminal liability.

The official, and primary, support club for the Outlaws is the Black Pistons Motorcycle Club, which is active internationally. Other support clubs range from local groups, such as the Undertakers MC in Lexington, Kentucky, to regional clubs like the Chosen Few MC, which is based in Canada and Upstate New York. In Norway, the Outlaws oversee the Black & White Crew, a "street crew" in which members are not required to own a motorcycle.

== Criminal allegations and incidents ==
The Outlaws are classified by various law enforcement agencies in the United States as one of the "big four" motorcycle gangs, along with the Bandidos, the Hells Angels, and the Pagans. The Department of Justice contends that the club is involved in organized crime, including drug trafficking, extortion, money laundering, prostitution rings, weapons trafficking, and violent acts directed at rival clubs. One recurring allegation is that the Outlaws are responsible for the production and distribution of methamphetamine. Law enforcement and intelligence agencies internationally, including the Criminal Intelligence Service Canada and Europol, also consider the Outlaws a criminal organization.

Members have continuously denied that the Outlaws are an organized crime syndicate, asserted that the club is simply a group of motorcycle enthusiasts who live a nonconventional lifestyle, and described allegations by investigators and prosecutors as exaggerated. The Outlaws' website features a statement reading:

The government has labeled the Outlaws MC a criminal organization and all it's [sic] members as criminals simply because they are members. This is one of the most untrue and unjust statements ever made concerning our club. Each and every day through out [sic] America and the World members of Law Enforcement, Religious, Fraternal organizations as well as many other groups are convicted of criminal activity. Their membership is not universally labeled as criminals.

A saying used by members of the club is: "Outlaws we are, RICO we're not".

== See also ==
- List of outlaw motorcycle clubs
- The Bikeriders

== Bibliography ==
- Barker, Thomas (2007). Biker Gangs and Organized Crime. Oxfordshire: Routledge. ISBN 9781593454067.
- Droban, Kerrie; James, Peter (2017). The Last Chicago Boss: My Life with the Chicago Outlaws Motorcycle Club. New York City: St. Martin's Press. ISBN 9781250105912.
- Langton, Jerry (2006). Fallen Angel: The Unlikely Rise of Walter Stadnick and the Canadian Hells Angels. Toronto: Harper Collins. ISBN 144342725X.
- Langton, Jerry (2010). Showdown: How the Outlaws, Hells Angels and Cops Fought for Control of the Streets. Toronto: John Wiley & Sons. ISBN 978-0470678787.
- Lavigne, Yves (1996). Hell's Angels: Into the Abyss. New York City: HarperCollins. ISBN 9780006385707.
- Roberts, Walter (2012). Biker Gangs. London: RW Press. ISBN 9781909284067.
- Schneider, Stephen (2009). Iced: The Story of Organized Crime in Canada (2nd ed.). Toronto: John Wiley & Sons. ISBN 978-0470835005.
