= Federal Correctional Institution, Ashland =

Low-security prison in Kentucky, US

Coordinates: 38°26′07″N 82°42′17″W

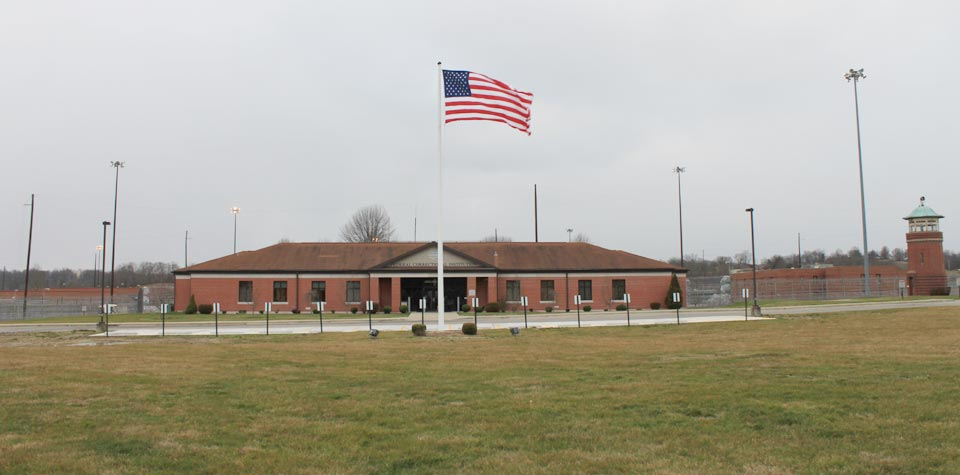
- Interactive map of Federal Correctional Institution, Ashland
- Location: Boyd County, near Ashland, Kentucky, US
- Status: Operational
- Security class: Low-security (with minimum-security prison camp)
- Population: 1,300 (300 in prison camp)
- Opened: 1940
- Managed by: Federal Bureau of Prisons

The Federal Correctional Institution, Ashland (FCI Ashland) is a low-security United States federal prison for male inmates in the unincorporated area of Summit in Boyd County, Kentucky, approximately 5 miles (8.0 km) outside the city of Ashland. It is operated by the Federal Bureau of Prisons, a division of the United States Department of Justice. It also includes a satellite prison camp for minimum-security male offenders.

FCI Ashland is located approximately 125 miles (201 km) east of Lexington, Kentucky.

== History and description of facility ==
FCI Ashland opened in 1940. It currently holds inmates who are serving short-term sentences and are engaged in a "phasing down process" for prisoners who are close to completing their sentences in one of the regional prisons. FCI Ashland's primary service area includes Kentucky, southern Indiana, southern Ohio, western Pennsylvania (Greater Pittsburgh), Tennessee, and West Virginia.

FCI Ashland has a satellite camp which Forbes magazine ranked as one of the best places to go to prison in the United States. The camp holds a "wellness" program including aerobic exercise and stress reduction programs.

== Notable incidents ==
In 1944, future civil rights leader Bayard Rustin, then 32 years old and serving a three-year sentence for his political (socialist) and religious (Quaker) refusal of the draft in World War II, helped lead a nonviolent campaign for racial integration of prison cell blocks and dining halls, including a hunger strike. The campaign was partially successful, although Rustin served time in solitary confinement and was eventually subjected to a punitive transfer to Lewisburg Penitentiary.

On December 5, 2008, former National Football League receiver Mark Ingram Sr. failed to report to FCI Ashland after being sentenced to 92 months on bank fraud and money laundering charges. Ingram, who was in and out of jail after his playing days ended in 1996, had already been granted a delay to watch his son, Mark Ingram Jr., finish his freshman season as a running back at the University of Alabama. Ingram asked for a second delay to watch his son play in the 2009 Sugar Bowl in New Orleans between Utah and Alabama. When the judge said no, Ingram went on the lam. US Marshals arrested him a month later in a Michigan motel room, two hours before the Sugar Bowl kickoff. He was on the bed watching the pre-game show on television. Ingram subsequently had two years added to his sentence. He was held at the Federal Correctional Institution, Yazoo City, a low-security facility in Mississippi, and was released in 2015.

On May 13, 2014, local media outlets reported that 46-year-old James Lewis, a former correctional officer at FCI Ashland, had been sentenced to 15 months in federal prison. Lewis had pleaded guilty to conspiring with inmate Gary Musick and Musick's girlfriend, Cindy Gates, to bring marijuana and nude photographs into the prison between December 2010 and February 2012. Musick was convicted of conspiracy while Gates pleaded guilty to a misdemeanor conspiracy charge and was sentenced to probation.

== Notable inmates (current and former) ==
Inmate Name	Register Number	Photo	Status	Details
Jeremy Harrell	84846-510		Released in 2025 after serving a 6-month sentence.	Founder and Former CEO of Veteran's Club INC and National Veteran Advocate was sentenced to 6 months in Federal Prison for volunteering too much within his organization as a Disabled Combat Veteran. https://www.yahoo.com/news/veterans-club-inc-founder-sentenced-231010488
Mark Ciavarella	15008-067		Serving a 28-year sentence; scheduled for release in 2034.	A former Luzerne County, Pennsylvania President Judge, Ciavarella was sentenced to 28 years in federal prison in 2011 for racketeering, fraud, money laundering, extortion, bribery and tax evasion, many of the charges stemming from his involvement in the kids for cash scandal.
Robert Hadden	07740-509		Serving a 20-year sentence; scheduled for release in 2039	Gynecologist who was convicted of sexually abusing four women that travelled to the state of New York to see him, although the number of allegations against Hadden is over 200.
Kevin James	12303-028		Released in 2022; served 15 years.	Former inmate at California State Prison, Sacramento; pleaded guilty in 2007 to conspiring to wage war against the US for founding an Islamic terrorist group while in prison and planning attacks at LA International Airport and several other targets.
David Kernell	32341-074		Released from custody in November 2011; served 10 months.	Convicted in 2010 of unauthorized access to a computer and obstruction of justice for hacking into then-Republican vice presidential candidate Sarah Palin's e-mail account in 2008. Died at 30 years old, on 2/1/18, or 2/2/18, of complications of multiple sclerosis.
Shahawar Matin Siraj	63283-053		Serving a 30-year sentence; scheduled for release in 2030.	Convicted for planning to bomb a New York City subway.
Azamat Tazhayakov	95090-038		Released in 2016; served 3 years.	Lied to federal investigators during an investigation related to Dzhokhar Tsarnaev (Boston Marathon bombing). His former University of Massachusetts classmates Robel Phillipos and Dias Kadyrbayev, remain housed at low security federal prisons in Loretto, Pennsylvania, and Big Springs, Texas, respectively.
Ryan Collins	75212-067		Released on February 13, 2018, from federal Residential Reentry Management housing in Philadelphia.	Hacked into a number of celebrity owned Google Drive and iCloud accounts to steal explicit photos.
Nico Walker	57016-060		Served an 11-year sentence, released 2020	Author and US Army Veteran charged with bank robberies
John Russell Whitt	19945-057		Currently serving a federal prison sentence for robbery. Now at FMC Butner. Scheduled for release on January 16, 2037.	Pled guilty on January 15, 2020, to two charges of second degree murder and two charges of concealment of death and was sentenced to 26 to 32 years for each murder, to be served consecutively after he completes his sentence in federal prison for robbery in 2037.
Paul Miller	32607-509		Served a 41-month sentence; released on July 3, 2023.	White supremacist charged with possession of a firearm, possession of ammunition and possession of an unregistered firearm.
John Fitzgerald Johnson	20257-509		Serving 7 years; Scheduled for a July 2, 2028 release	Also known as Grand Master Jay. Founder and Leader of The All Black Pro-Gun Militia Not Fucking Around Coalition Sentenced to a minimum of 3 years and a maximum of 7 years for pointing his AR-15 at federal agents during a Breonna Taylor Protest. He was arrested 3 months later.
Troy Titus	58299-083		Serving a 30-year sentence; scheduled for release in 2034.	Former real estate investor; convicted in 2009 of fraud, money laundering and other charges for orchestrating a Ponzi scheme in which 30 victims lost over $5 million; Titus's story was featured on the CNBC television program American Greed.

== See also ==
- List of U.S. federal prisons
- Federal Bureau of Prisons
- Incarceration in the United States
