= Tony Zemaitis =

British luthier

- Born: 10 April 1935; London, England
- Died: 17 August 2002 (aged 67); Chatham, England
- Occupation: Guitar maker
- Children: Tony Zemaitis, Jr.

Tony Zemaitis (1935 – 17 August 2002) was a Lithuanian-British luthier from London. He was mostly known for his "metal top" electric guitars, which were used by notable rock musicians. After his death in 2002, Zemaitis Guitars company continued his guitar-making style in Tokyo, Japan, under the leadership of his son, Tony Zemaitis Jr.

== Early years ==
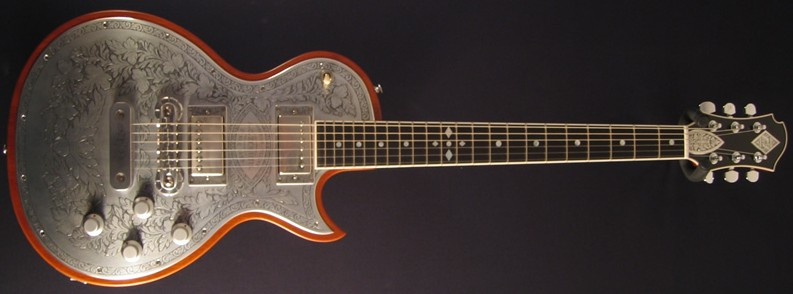
Metal Front guitar

Zemaitis (birth name Antanas Kazimeras Žemaitis) was born 1935 in London, England of Lithuanian ancestry. He left school at the age of sixteen to help with family finances and took up a five-year apprenticeship as a cabinet maker. When he found an old, damaged guitar in his family attic he found his real passion in life. In 1957, after completing national service, Zemaitis began building a few basic guitars in order to learn about construction, soundhole shapes, tonewoods, and string length. He also experimented with building other multi-stringed instruments, and some of these found their way to the folk scene. In 1960, having realized that musicians needed simple and light instruments, he began selling his guitars at prices which covered the cost of materials, and by 1961, after being mentioned in the music press, Zemaitis started to be approached by leading players.

== 1970s: Fame ==
Keith Richards playing a Zemaitis guitar in 1975.

In 1970 Zemaitis began experimenting with placing a metal shield on the top of the guitar body to eliminate microphonic noise through the pickups. His first metal-top guitar prototype was purchased by Tony McPhee; the second was built for Ronnie Wood of the Rolling Stones (who was in The Faces at the time). Wood played the instrument on The Faces' Top of the Pops appearance in 1971, and the shiny appearance of the guitar raised much interest from other guitar players. Zemaitis asked gun engraver Danny O'Brien to create artistic images on the top and other metal parts of the guitar, and he started building custom-order guitars for rich and famous musicians. His most famous guitars were Ronnie Wood's 24-fret metal-top guitars. Zemaitis built four of these for Wood, which he used from 1971 until 1995. He also built Ronnie Wood's "Desert Island" (or "Slide on This") metal-disc top guitar, Keith Richards' 5-string "Skull & Bones" guitar, Eric Clapton's "Ivan the Terrible" 12-string acoustic guitar, various acoustic guitars and resonator guitars for George Harrison, and bass guitars and a resonator guitar for Ronnie Lane. In 1978, he made a unique acoustic bass for David Gilmour of Pink Floyd.

From the mid-70s, Zemaitis started decorating the tops of his guitars, other than the metal-tops, with elaborate pearl inlay, using figures such as dragons and skulls and bones, or with a mosaic-style inlay. These Zemaitis guitars command the highest second-hand prices.

== Later career and death ==
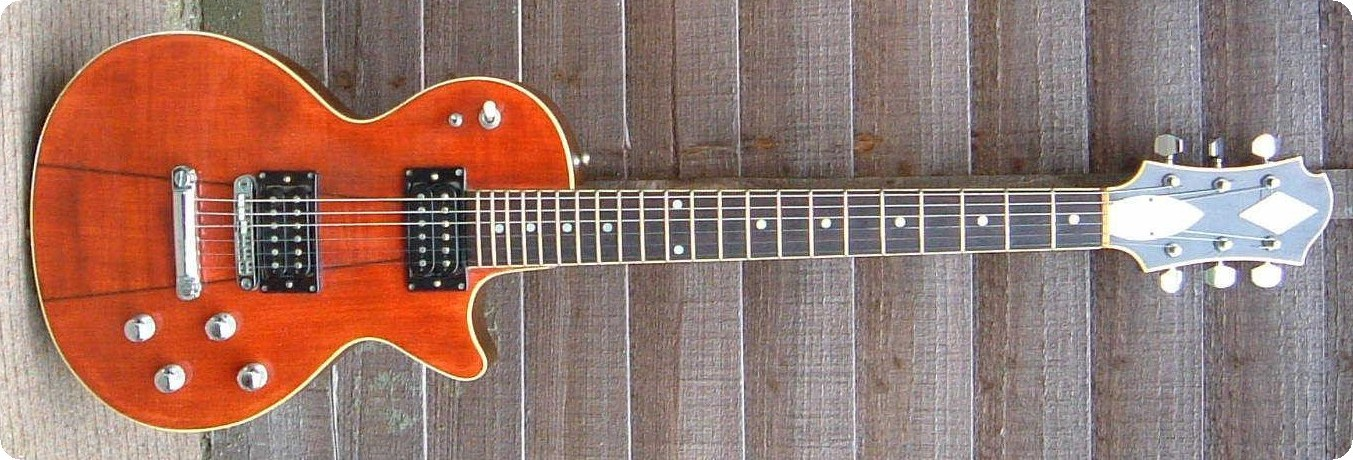
Example of a Zemaitis "Student model".

In the 1980s Zemaitis launched a "student model" guitar that could be upgraded when the player could afford it, but this proved to be too popular and time-consuming. This model threatened to overshadow all other guitar production and was discontinued. By the 1980s Zemaitis was taking more orders for guitars than he could produce and he was having to turn down work.

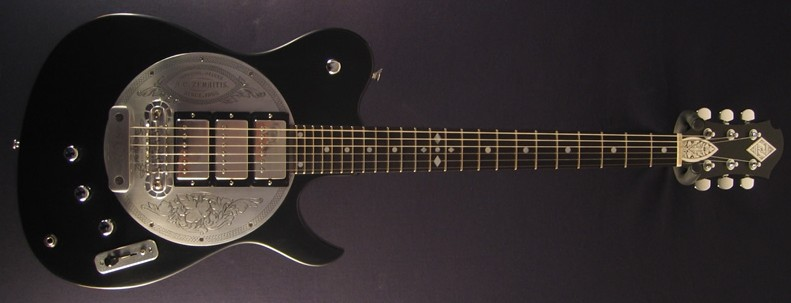
Zemaitis "Disc" guitar, a close copy of the original model built for and used by Ron Wood.

In the 1990s, Zemaitis guitars became very collectable and forgeries began to appear. These forgeries in both new and second hand guise, while looking genuine, used poorer-quality materials and did not sound like a genuine Zemaitis. During his 39 years of production, Zemaitis had a policy of never making two guitars the same, and he limited himself to making only ten guitars a year to ensure the quality of each instrument.

Zemaitis retired in 2000 and died two years later. His guitar-making style was carried on by Zemaitis Guitars of Tokyo, Japan. Led by his son, Tony Zemaitis Jr., the company continued to employ Danny O'Brien as an engraver.

In 2007, American economist-turned-fraudster Al Parish bought an acoustic guitar made by Zemaitis and owned by George Harrison for $150,000.

== See also ==
- Zemaitis Guitars
