= Federal Correctional Complex, Butner =

Federal prison in Butner, North Carolina, US

Coordinates: 36.13944°N 78.80442°W

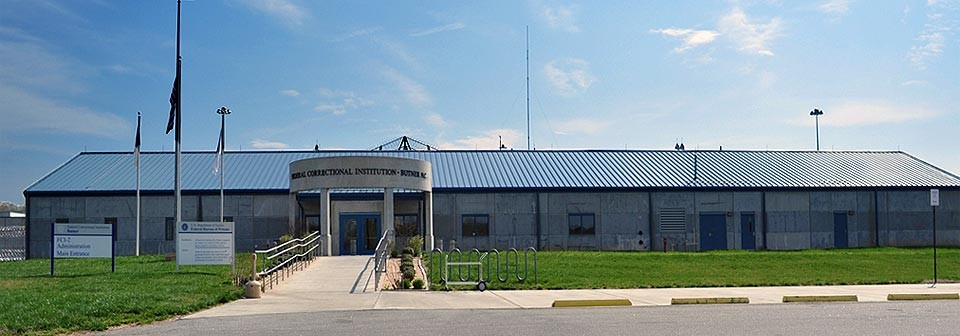
- Interactive map of Federal Correctional Complex, Butner
- Location: Mangum Township, Durham County / Dutchville Township, Granville County, North Carolina
- Status: Operational
- Security class: Minimum, Low, Medium and administrative security (FMC Butner is a medical facility)
- Population: 5,000 (four facilities)
- Managed by: Federal Bureau of Prisons

The Federal Correctional Complex, Butner (FCC Butner) is a United States federal prison complex for men near Butner, North Carolina. It is operated by the Federal Bureau of Prisons, a division of the United States Department of Justice. FCC Butner is about 25 miles (40 km) northwest of Raleigh, the state capital. It includes the Bureau's largest medical complex, which operates a drug treatment program and specializes in oncology and behavioral science. Among its inmates was Bernie Madoff, who was convicted of perpetrating the largest Ponzi scheme in history. He died at the prison in April 2021.

The complex consists of four facilities:

- Federal Correctional Institution, Butner Low (FCI Butner Low): a low-security facility, opened in 1995.
- Federal Correctional Institution, Butner Medium I (FCI Butner Medium I): a medium-security facility, opened in 1976
- Federal Correctional Institution, Butner Medium II (FCI Butner Medium II): a medium-security facility, opened in 2006
- Federal Medical Center, Butner (FMC Butner): a facility which houses inmates of all security levels with health issues, opened in 1995.

The complex lies in an unincorporated area on the county line between Durham County to the west and Granville County to the east. On the Durham County side, the portion of the prison is in Mangum Township, while on the Granville County side, it is in Dutchville Township.

== Incidents ==
=== Alleged Madoff assault ===
On March 18, 2010, The Wall Street Journal reported that Bernie Madoff, the New York financier serving a 150-year sentence at FCI Butner for running a Ponzi scheme that cost investors billions of dollars, was assaulted by another inmate in December 2009. Citing three sources, a current inmate, a former inmate, and a prison employee, the newspaper reported that the assailant was an inmate serving time for a drug conviction who believed that Madoff owed him money. The inmate reported that Madoff suffered a broken nose, fractured ribs, and cuts to his head and face. In response to the report, Bureau of Prisons spokeswoman Denise Simmons said, "We have no knowledge or information to confirm he was assaulted."

=== Murder plot ===
On November 16, 2011, James Lukinoff, an inmate at FCI Butner, was indicted for planning to assault and kill an FBI agent who had been involved in investigating the crime for which Lukinoff was sent to prison. The indictment alleged that, from February 2009 to April 2011, Lukinoff developed and pursued a plan to purchase a suppressor and had a friend or family member store it until his release from prison. Once released, Lukinoff planned to retrieve the suppressor and his firearm, and kill the agent. Lukinoff pleaded guilty to retaliating against a federal official by threat on June 20, 2012. He was held at the Federal Medical Center, Butner and was scheduled for release in 2024.

== Inmates ==
=== High-profile crimes ===
Inmate Name	Register Number	Photo	Status	Details
Larry Hall	10332-026		Serving a life sentence without parole.	American kidnapper, rapist, murderer, and suspected serial killer. An aficionado of the American Revolution and Civil War, Hall traveled around the Midwest for historical reenactments and is believed to have abducted, raped, tortured, and murdered dozens of girls and women.
Mel Reynolds	07476-424		Sentence commuted by President Bill Clinton in 2001; served his sentence at the minimum-security prison camp.	Illinois Congressman from 1993 to 1995; convicted in 1995 of sexual assault, obstruction of justice and solicitation of child pornography in connection with his relationship with a 16-year-old campaign worker; convicted in 1997 of bank fraud.
Bernard Madoff	61727-054		Served 11 years of a 150-year sentence until his death on April 14, 2021.	Former financier; pleaded guilty in 2009 to fraud, money laundering, perjury and theft for perpetrating the largest Ponzi scheme in US history, robbing thousands of investors of over $65 billion over 20 years; the story was featured on the CNBC television program American Greed. Died in 2021.
John Hinckley Jr.	00137-177		Released to a psychiatric hospital in 1981.	Attempted to assassinate President Ronald Reagan in Washington, D.C., on March 30, 1981, as the culmination of an effort to impress teen actress Jodie Foster; found not guilty by reason of insanity in 1982.
R. Kelly	09627-035		Serving a 31 year sentence, Scheduled for release on December 21, 2045.	Former R&B singer and music artist, convicted of racketeering, violations of the Mann Act, producing child pornography, sex trafficking, and child exploitation charges.
Jon Burge	50504-018		Released from custody in 2015; served 4 years.	Former Chicago Police Department commander; convicted in 2010 of obstruction of justice and perjury for torturing more than 200 criminal suspects between 1972 and 1991, eliciting dozens of false confessions.
Scott Kevin Fairlamb	26840-509		Released on June 8, 2023.	Former MMA fighter pleaded guilty to assaulting an officer during the United States Capitol attack.
Sami Osmakac	55958-018		Serving a 40-year sentence, scheduled for release in 2046. Currently at USP McCreary.	Convicted of one count of attempted use of a weapon of mass destruction, and one count of possession of an unregistered automatic firearm in connection with a terrorist plot.
Christopher Paul Hasson	64544-037		Serving a 13-year sentence, scheduled for release in 2033.	Former USCG lieutenant and White Nationalist arrested in connection to domestic terrorism plot. Plead guilty in 2020 to federal charges of unlawful possession of unregistered silencers, unlawful possession of un-serialized silencers, possession of firearms by an unlawful user of a controlled substance, and unlawful possession of a controlled substance (tramadol).
Jesse Jackson Jr.	32451-016		Served 30 months. Released on the morning of June 22, 2015, after spending three months serving his remaining sentence in a halfway house.	Illinois Congressman from 1995 to 2012, and son of Jesse Jackson. In early February 2013, Jackson pleaded guilty to charges of fraud, conspiracy, making false statements, mail fraud, wire fraud, and criminal forfeiture—having used about $750,000 in campaign money for over 3,000 personal purchases that included a Michael Jackson fedora and cashmere capes.
Roman Seleznev	04385-093		Served 10 years of a 27-year sentence, released in a prisoner exchange on August 1, 2024.	Russian hacker; convicted in 2017 on 38 counts of hacking, wire fraud, and racketeering for stealing and selling millions of credit card numbers, causing more than $169 million in damages to businesses and banks.
Scott Tyree	45380-083		Released in September 2021; served 17 years.	Kidnapper of Alicia Kozakiewicz.
Nicholas Ochs	12336-122		Serving a 4 year sentence; was pardoned by Donald Trump in 2025.	Leader of the Proud Boys Hawaii chapter. Arrested for participating in the U.S. Capitol attack.
John Russell Whitt	19945-057		Transferred from FCI Ashland; scheduled for release in 2037	Sentenced to two consecutive 26 to 32 year sentences for the murders of his wife and son.
James Von Brunn	07128-016		Died while awaiting trial in 2010	White supremacist who perpetrated the 2009 United States Holocaust Memorial Museum shooting, which killed an officer.
Ted Kaczynski	04475-046		Served multiple life sentences before his death in 2023	American mathematician and domestic terrorist known as the "Unabomber" who was convicted of multiple counts of first-degree murder in 1998.
Keith Raniere	57005-177		Serving 120 years. Previously at Tucson USP	American cult leader and co-founder of NXIVM who was convicted of a pattern of racketeering activity, including human trafficking, sex offenses, and fraud.
Sai Varshith Kandula	60742-510		Serving eight years. Set to be released August 17, 2029	Indian national who drove a U-Haul truck into the north barriers of Lafayette Square with the goal of replacing the government with a Nazi dictatorship.

=== Organized crime ===
Inmate Name	Register Number	Photo	Status	Details
Gilberto Rodríguez Orejuela	14023-059		Died in 2022 while serving a 30-year sentence; had been scheduled for release in 2029.	Co-founder of the now-defunct Cali Cartel, which was responsible for as much as 80% of the cocaine brought into the US in the 1970s and 1980s; co-founder Miguel Rodríguez Orejuela is also serving a 30-year sentence.
Carmine Persico	74666-158		Died at Duke University Medical Center while serving a combined sentence of 139 years; was eligible for release in 2050.	Mafia figure; former Colombo crime family Boss; convicted in 1986 of murder, loansharking, bribery and extortion, all in aid of racketeering, in order to control and profit from the concrete industry in New York City.
John Connolly	22928-038		Transferred to state prison in 2011; served 10 years.	Former FBI Agent; convicted in 2002 of racketeering conspiracy for aiding Irish Mob figure Whitey Bulger; currently serving a 40-year sentence in a Florida state prison for the murder of a witness.
Gerard Ouimette	02519-070		Served 21 years until his death in 2015	Mafia figure; former Patriarca crime family associate; convicted of extortion
Vittorio "Vic" Amuso	38740-079		Serving a life sentence.	Boss of the current Lucchese crime family in New York City; convicted in 1992 of racketeering and murder in connection with nine murders, as well as extortion, gambling and labor corruption.
Nicodemo Scarfo	09813-050		Died in 2017 while serving a 55-year sentence; was scheduled for release in 2033.	Former boss of the Bruno crime family in Philadelphia, he was convicted on multiple counts of murder, attempted murder, distribution of methamphetamine, and extortion.
Peter Gotti	99109-012		Served 15 years of a 25-year sentence until his death in 2021.	Mafia figure; former Gambino crime family boss; convicted of racketeering and other crimes

=== Financial crimes ===
Inmate Name	Register Number	Photo	Status	Details
Troy Titus	58299-083		Serving a 30-year sentence; scheduled for release in 2034. Currently at FCI Ashland.	Former real estate investor; convicted in 2009 of fraud, money laundering and other charges for orchestrating a Ponzi scheme in which 30 victims lost over $5 million; Titus's story was featured on the CNBC television program American Greed.
Lee Farkas	43560-018		Sentenced to 30 years; originally scheduled for release in 2037. Compassionately released on September 29, 2020.	Former Chairman of Taylor, Bean & Whitaker Mortgage Corporation; convicted in 2011 of fraud for masterminding a $2.9 billion scheme that led to the 2009 collapse of Colonial Bank; the story was featured on the CNBC program American Greed.
Samuel Israel	84430-054		Serving a 22-year sentence. Currently at RRM Dallas; scheduled for release in 2026.	Founder of the now defunct Bayou Hedge Fund Group; pleaded guilty in 2008 to defrauding investors of $400 million; attempted to fake his own suicide to avoid prison; the story was featured on the CNBC television program American Greed.
Al Parish	12031-171		Sentenced to 24 years; originally scheduled for release in 2029. Compassionately released on March 24, 2021.	Former Charleston Southern University economist, who was sentenced to federal prison in 2008 after pleading guilty to financial fraud. Nearly 300 people lost up to $66 million invested in Parish Economic's private investment funds. Before being charged with fraud, Parish was known as a flamboyant local financial expert dubbed 'Economan', and was known for his $1.2 million pen collection, including a $170,000 diamond-encrusted pen. Included in the fraud was over $4 million set aside for athletic facilities improvements at Charleston Southern University.
Michael Parnell	96286-020		Serving a 20-year sentence; scheduled for release in 2031.	Former Peanut Broker convicted of conspiracy, fraud and other federal charges.

=== Espionage ===
Inmate Name	Register Number	Photo	Status	Details
John Walker	22449-037		Died in custody in 2014 while serving a life sentence.	Former Chief Warrant Officer for the US Navy; pleaded guilty to espionage in 1986 for selling classified documents to the Soviet Union. Co-conspirator Jerry Whitworth is also serving a life sentence.
Jonathan Pollard	09185-016		Granted parole and released in 2015 after serving 30 years of a life sentence	Former intelligence analyst for the United States government. In 1987, as part of a plea agreement, Pollard pleaded guilty to spying for and providing top-secret classified information to Israel. He was sentenced to life in prison for violations of the Espionage Act.

Inmate Name	Register Number	Photo	Status	Details
Roger Loughry, Sr.	43691-037		Died in custody in 2025 while serving a 30-year sentence.	Administrator of "The Cache," an online bulletin board where hundreds of child pornographers from around the world shared images and videos of children being molested; convicted in 2013 of advertising and distributing child pornography.

== In popular culture ==
- In the final episode of the television series Better Call Saul, the series' main character Saul Goodman refers to FCI Butner Low as his ideal prison, and manages to get approval to serve his sentence there.

== See also ==
- List of U.S. federal prisons
- Federal Bureau of Prisons
- Incarceration in the United States
