= Gerald F. Keeling =

United States Air Force general

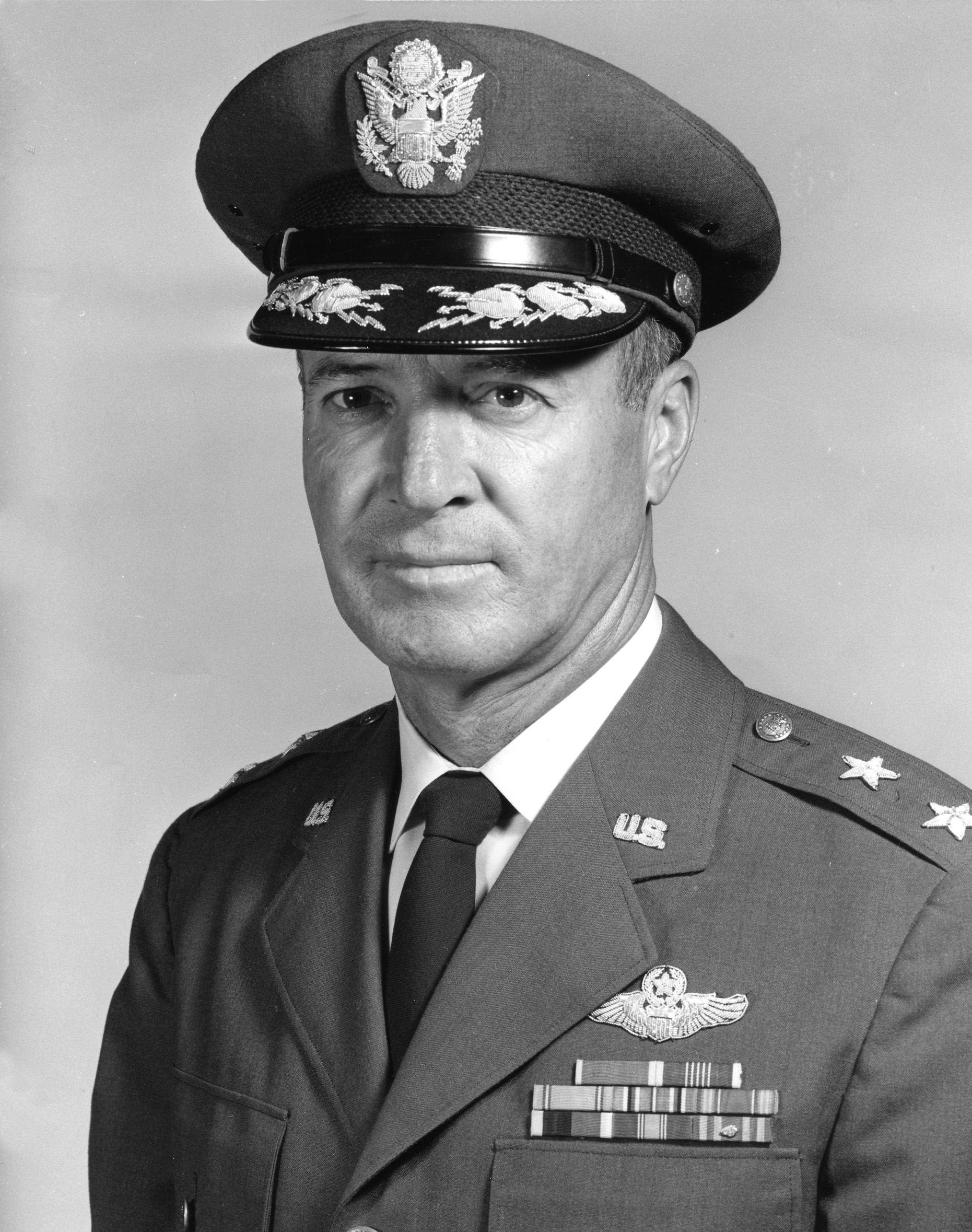
- Born: 23 October 1915; Lockney, Texas, US
- Died: 23 September 2006 (aged 89); Los Angeles, California, US
- Burial place: Pythian Cemetery, Bunkie, Louisiana, US
- Military career
- Allegiance: United States
- Branch: United States Army (1939–1947); United States Air Force (1947–1969)
- Service years: 1939–1970
- Rank: Major General
- Conflicts: World War II
- Awards: Legion of Merit; Army Commendation Medal

Gerald Fay Keeling (23 October 1915 – 23 September 2006) was a major general in the United States Air Force, who served as Deputy Chief of Staff for Procurement and Production for the Air Force Systems Command, and as Assistant Deputy Chief of Staff of the Air Force for Systems and Logistics.

== Early life ==
Gerald Fay Keeling was born in Lockney, Texas, on 23 October 1915. He attended high school in Fowler, Colorado, and entered Colorado A&M in 1933. In 1939, he enlisted in the United States Army Air Corps as an aviation cadet. He graduated from flying school at Randolph Field, Texas, in June 1940.

== World War II ==
After graduation, Keeling served as a flight instructor at Randolph Field. From 1942 to 1944, he was involved in activating schools for bombardiers in Texas and Big Springs, Texas, where he was a squadron commander and station commander. In 1945, he graduated from the United States Army Command and General Staff College at Fort Leavenworth, Kansas. He also attended the Air Command and Staff College. His first overseas assignment came in 1947, when he became chief of staff of the 301st Fighter Wing, which was part of the Fifth Air Force, and stationed on Okinawa.

== Postwar ==
On returning to the United States in 1948, Keeling was stationed at Wright-Patterson Air Force Base on Ohio as the chief of the Aircraft and Missile Section in the Procurement Division of the Air Materiel Command. He attended the University of Pittsburgh, completing the management course there in 1949. He attended the Air War College at Maxwell Air Force Base in Alabama, from he graduated in 1954.

Keeling served at U.S. Air Force headquarters from July 1954 through May 1958. During the first year he was deputy director, Procurement and Production Engineering, before becoming executive to the Deputy Chief of Staff, Materiel. In this position he was instrumental in developing a "coordinated program of a highly classified nature of immeasurable importance to the nation's security", for which he received the Legion of Merit in 1956.

In 1958, Keeling became the Air Force plant representative at North American Aviation in 1958. He became Commander of Headquarters Western Contract Management Region in July 1960, and the director of procurement of the Air Force Systems Command in July 1962. In February 1963 he became Deputy Chief of Staff for Procurement and Production for the Air Force Systems Command at Andrews Air Force Base in Maryland. His final assignment came in August 1967, as Assistant Deputy Chief of Staff for Systems and Logistics at U.S. Air Force headquarters at The Pentagon. He retired on 1 August 1969.

== Later life ==
In retirement, Keeling lived in Los Angeles. He died from stomach cancer on 23 September 2006.
