= List of Concatenated Order of Hoo-Hoo chapters =

The Concatenated Order of Hoo-Hoo, also known as the Fraternal Order of Lumbermen, is a fraternal and service organization with members in the forest products industry. It was founded on January 21, 1892, at Gurdon, Arkansas. The order has members in United States, Australia, Canada, Malaysia, New Zealand,and South Africa. Following are the chapters, called clubs, of the Concatenated Order of Hoo-Hoo's chapters are called clubs and its colonies are called rebuilding clubs. In the following list, active chapters indicated in bold and inactive chapters in italics.

No.	Club	Charter date and range	Location	Jurisdiction	Status	Ref.
1	**Atlanta-Dick Wilson**	July 1921	Atlanta, Georgia	9 USA	Active	
2	Los Angeles		Los Angeles, California	6 USA	Inactive	
3	San Diego		San Diego, California	6 USA	Inactive	
4	Beaumont		Beaumont, Texas	7 USA	Inactive	
5	Oklahoma City		Oklahoma City, Oklahoma	7 USA	Inactive	
6	Greater St. Louis		St. Louis, Missouri	7 USA	Inactive	
7	Border		El Paso, Texas	7 USA	Inactive	
8	Panhandle Plains		Amarillo, Texas	7 USA	Inactive	
9	San Francisco		San Francisco, California	6 USA	Inactive	
10	Grand Rapids		Grand Rapids, Michigan	2 USA	Inactive	
11	Cairo		Cairo, Illinois	2 USA	Inactive	
12	**Twin Cities**		Minneapolis, Minnesota	8 USA	Active	
12	**Twin Cities**		Saint Paul, Minnesota	8 USA	Active	
13	**Harry L. Folsom**		Boston, Massachusetts	1 USA	Active	
14	Head of the Lakes and Range		Duluth, Minnesota	8 USA	Inactive	
15	Warren		Warren, Arkansas	7 USA	Inactive	
16	**Spokane**		Spokane, Washington	3 USA	Colony	
17	Central Michigan		Lansing, Michigan	2 USA	Inactive	
18	Waco		Waco, Texas	7 USA	Inactive	
19	Saginaw		Saginaw, Michigan	2 USA	Inactive	
20	San Antonio	19xx ?–19xx?, 1978	San Antonio, Texas	7 USA	Inactive	
21	Fort Wayne		Fort Wayne, Indiana	2 USA	Inactive	
22	Coos Bay		Marshfield, Oregon	3 USA	Inactive	
23	**Houston**		Houston, Texas	7 USA	Active	
24	Winnipeg	March 21, 1924	Winnipeg, Manitoba, Canada	5 Canada	Inactive	
25	South Bend		South Bend, Indiana	2 USA	Inactive	
26	Little Rock		Little Rock, Arkansas	7 USA	Inactive	
27	Tulsa		Tulsa, Oklahoma	7 USA	Inactive	
28	**Detroit**	May 28, 1924	Detroit, Michigan	2 USA	Active	
29	**Chicago**		Chicago, Illinois	2 USA	Colony	
30	Cleveland		Cleveland, Ohio	2 USA	Inactive	
31	San Joaquin Valley		Fresno, California	6 USA	Inactive	
32	Bend		Bend, Oregon	3 USA	Inactive	
33	Willamette Valley		Eugene, Oregon	3 USA	Inactive	
34	Seattle		Seattle, Washington	3 USA	Inactive	
35	Ben F. Springer		Milwaukee, Wisconsin	2 USA	Inactive	
36	Fort Worth		Fort Worth, Texas	7 USA	Inactive	
37	Susanville		Susanville, California	6 USA	Inactive	
38	Westwood		Westwood, California	6 USA	Inactive	
39	**Oakland**		Oakland, California	6 USA	Colony	
40	Reno		Reno, Nevada	6 USA	Inactive	
41	Indianapolis		Indianapolis, Indiana	2 USA	Inactive	
42	Greater Miami		Miami, Florida	9 USA	Inactive	
43	Greater Kansas City		Kansas City, Missouri	7 USA	Inactive	
44	Citrus Belt		San Bernardino, California	6 USA	Inactive	
45	Wichita Falls		Wichita Falls, Texas	7 USA	Inactive	
46	Malvern		Malvern, Arkansas	7 USA	Inactive	
47	**Portland**		Portland, Oregon	3 USA	Active	
48	**Vancouver**		Vancouver, British Columbia, Canada	5 Canada	Active	
49	Sherman		Sherman, Texas	7 USA	Inactive	
50	Denton		Denton, Texas	7 USA	Inactive	
51	**Roger Williams**		Providence, Rhode Island	1 USA	Active	
52	Jacksonville		Jacksonville, Florida	9 USA	Inactive	
53	Toronto		Toronto, Canada	5 Canada	Inactive	
54	**Maine**		Portland, Maine	1 USA	Colony	
55	Tom A. McCann		McCloud, California	6 USA	Inactive	
56	Tampa		Tampa, Florida	9 USA	Inactive	
57	Nutmeg		Hartford, Connecticut	1 USA	Inactive	
58	San Jose Peninsula		Palo Alto, California	6 USA	Inactive	
59	Western Massachusetts		Springfield, Massachusetts	1 USA	Inactive	
60	Montreal		Montreal, Quebec, Canada	5 Canada	Inactive	
61	Sand Point		Sandpoint, Idaho	3 USA	Inactive	
62	Central California-Stockton		Stockton, California	6 USA	Inactive	
63	**Humboldt**		Eureka, California	6 USA	Active	
64	St. Petersburg		St. Petersburg, Florida	9 USA	Inactive	
65	Redwood Empire Foot Hills		Santa Rosa, California	6 USA	Inactive	
66	Lewis-Clark		Lewiston, Idaho	3 USA	Inactive	
67	Macon		Macon, Georgia	9 USA	Inactive	
68	Missoula-Bonner		Bonnet, Montana	3 USA	Inactive	
68	Missoula-Bonner		Missoula, Montana	3 USA	Inactive	
69	Central New Mexico		Albuquerque, New Mexico	6 USA	Inactive	
70	Salt Lake City Utah County		Salt Lake City, Utah	6 USA	Inactive	
71	Buffalo		Buffalo, New York	2 USA	Inactive	
72	Phoenix		Phoenix, Arizona	6 USA	Inactive	
73	Douglas County		Douglas County, Illinois	2 USA	Inactive	
74	Denver		Denver, Colorado	6 USA	Inactive	
75	Dallas		Dallas, Texas	7 USA	Inactive	
76	Tyler		Tyler, Texas	7 USA	Inactive	
77	San Angelo		San Angelo, Texas	7 USA	Inactive	
78	St. Croix Valley		Bayport, Minnesota	8 USA	Inactive	
79	South Plains		Lubbock, Texas	7 USA	Inactive	
80	Altus		Altus, Oklahoma	7 USA	Inactive	
81	Chickasha		Chickasha, Oklahoma	7 USA	Inactive	
82	Lakehead		Port Arthur, Ontario, Canada	5 Canada	Inactive	
83	The Algoma		Blind River, Ontario, Canada	5 Canada	Inactive	
84	Longhorn		Big Springs, Texas	7 USA	Inactive	
85	Monroe		Monroe, Louisiana	7 USA	Inactive	
86	New Haven		New Haven, Connecticut	1 USA	Inactive	
87	Pampas		Pampas, Texas	7 USA	Inactive	
88	Youngstown		Youngstown, Ohio	2 USA	Inactive	
89	**Tacoma Olympia**		Olympia, Washington	3 USA	Active	
89	**Tacoma Olympia**		Tacoma, Washington	3 USA	Active	
90	Susquehanna		Laceyville, Pennsylvania	1 USA	Inactive	
91	Central MN		St. Cloud, Minnesota	8 USA	Inactive	
92	Memphis		Memphis, Tennessee	7 USA	Inactive	
93	Longview		Longview, Washington	3 USA	Inactive	
94	Rogue Valley		Medford, Oregon	3 USA	Inactive	
95	Crescent City		New Orleans, Louisiana	7 USA	Inactive	
96	Charlotte		Charlotte, North Carolina	9 USA	Inactive	
97	Pecos Valley		Carlsbad, New Mexico	6 USA	Inactive	
98	Corpus Christi		Corpus Christi, Texas	7 USA	Inactive	
99	Washington D.C.		Washington, D.C.	1 USA	Inactive	
100	Maryland		Baltimore, Maryland	1 USA	Inactive	
101	49er		Nevada City, California	6 USA	Inactive	
102	**Iowa**		Des Moines, Iowa	8 USA	Colony	
103	Dane County		Madison, Wisconsin	2 USA	Inactive	
104	Fargo-Moorhead		Fargo, North Dakota	8 USA	Inactive	
104	Fargo-Moorhead		Moorhead, Minnesota	8 USA	Inactive	
105	Orange County		Santa Ana, California	6 USA	Inactive	
106	Las Vegas		Las Vegas, Nevada	6 USA	Inactive	
107	**Granite State**		Manchester, New Hampshire	1 USA	Colony	
108	Garden State		Newark, New Jersey	1 USA	Inactive	
109	**Sacramento**		Sacramento, California	6 USA	Active	
110	Tucson		Tucson, Arizona	6 USA	Inactive	
111	Mississippi		Jackson, Mississippi	7 USA	Inactive	
112	Everett Bellingham		Bellingham, Washington	3 USA	Inactive	
112	Everett Bellingham		Everett, Washington	3 USA	Inactive	
113	West River		Rapid City, South Dakota	8 USA	Inactive	
114	Coast Counties		Salinas, California	6 USA	Inactive	
115	Central Florida		Orlando, Florida	9 USA	Inactive	
116	Lynn County		Lebanon, Oregon	3 USA	Inactive	
117	**Southern California**		Riverside, California	6 USA	Active	
118	Sioux Valley		Sioux Falls, South Dakota	8 USA	Inactive	
119	New York		New York City	1 USA	Inactive	
120	**Gurdon**		Gurdon, Arkansas	7 USA	Active	
121	Yakima Valley		Yakima, Washington	3 USA	Inactive	
122	Montgomery		Montgomery, Alabama	9 USA	Inactive	
123	Richmond		Richmond, Virginia	9 USA	Inactive	
124	Omaha		Omaha, Nebraska	8 USA	Inactive	
125	Santa Barbara		Santa Barbara, California	6 USA	Inactive	
126	Hutchinson		Hutchinson, Kansas	7 USA	Inactive	
127	Cape Cod		Hyannis, Massachusetts	1 USA	Inactive	
128	Central Massachusetts		Worcester, Massachusetts	1 USA	Inactive	
129	Reno		Reno, Nevada	6 USA	Inactive	(Note: Was originally club number 40.)
130	Bozeman-Billing		Billings, Montana	3 USA	Inactive	
130	Bozeman-Billing		Bozeman, Montana	3 USA	Inactive	
131	Mississippi		Rock Island, Illinois	2 USA	Inactive	
132	Northeastern Iowa		Waterloo, Iowa	8 USA	Inactive	
133	**Shasta Cascade**		Redding, California	6 USA	Active	
134	Savannah		Savannah, Georgia	9 USA	Inactive	
135	**East Texas**		Lufkin, Texas	7 USA	Colony	
136	**Volusia County**		Daytona Beach, Florida	9 USA	Active	
137	Central Missouri		Jefferson City, Montana	7 USA	Inactive	
138	Molly Pitcher		Eatontown, New Jersey	1 USA	Inactive	
139	Ken Hallgren of Northern Illinois		Rockford, Illinois	2 USA	Inactive	
140	South East Wyoming		Cheyenne, Wyoming	3 USA	Inactive	
141	Manila		Manila, Philippines	4 Philippines	Inactive	
142	**Honolulu**		Honolulu, Hawaii	3 USA	Colony	
143	Tri-State		Sioux City, Iowa	8 USA	Inactive	
144	Northern New York		Plattsburg, New York	1 USA	Inactive	
145	Knoxville		Knoxville, Tennessee	9 USA	Inactive	
146	Peoria		Peoria, Illinois	2 USA	Inactive	
147	Palm Beach		Palm Beach, Florida	9 USA	Inactive	
148	Lincoln		Lincoln, Nebraska	8 USA	Inactive	
149	San Juan		Durango, Colorado	6 USA	Inactive	
150	Southern Minnesota		Owatonna, Minnesota	8 USA	Inactive	
151	Prairie		Grand Island, Nebraska	8 USA	Inactive	
152	Philadelphia		Philadelphia, Pennsylvia	1 USA	Inactive	
153	Green Mountain		Montpelier, Vermont	1 USA	Inactive	
154	Hampton Roads		Newport News, Virginia	9 USA	Inactive	
155	North Idaho		Coeur d'Alene, Idaho	3 USA	Inactive	
156	Colorado Springs		Colorado Springs, Colorado	6 USA	Inactive	
157	Toledo		Toledo, Ohio	2 USA	Inactive	
158	Westfair		Ridgefield, Connecticut	1 USA	Inactive	
159	Lakeland		Andover, New Jersey	1 USA	Inactive	
160	West Side		Pine Bluff, Arkansas	7 USA	Inactive	
161	**Cradle of the Union**		Albany, New York	1 USA	Colony	
162	Columbia		Columbia, South Carolina	9 USA	Inactive	
163	Zamboanga		Zamboanga City, Philippines	4 Philippines	Inactive	
164	Alpine		Northern New Jersey, New Jersey	1 USA	Inactive	
165	Great Falls		Great Falls, Montana	3 USA	Inactive	
166	Missouri Spole		Bismarck, North Dakota	8 USA	Inactive	
167	Piedmont		Greenville, South Carolina	9 USA	Inactive	
168	Nashville		Nashville, Tennessee	9 USA	Inactive	
169	Appalachian of Virginia		Roanoke, Virginia	9 USA	Inactive	
170	Santa Clara Valley		San Jose, California	6 USA	Inactive	
170	Santa Clara Valley		Santa Clara, California	6 USA	Inactive	
171	Walt Whitman		Camden, New Jersey	1 USA	Inactive	
172	Birmingham		Birmingham, Alabama	9 USA	Inactive	
173	Wichita		Wichita, Kansas	7 USA	Inactive	
174	Northern Arizona		Flagstaff, Arizona	6 USA	Inactive	
175	Southern Colorado		Pueblo, Colorado	6 USA	Inactive	
176	Cross County		White Plains, New York	1 USA	Inactive	
177	Minot		Minot, North Dakota	8 USA	Inactive	
178	Long Island		Long Island, New York	1 USA	Inactive	
179	Western Pennsylvania		Pittsburgh, Pennsylvania	2 USA	Inactive	
180	Kern County		Bakersfield, California	6 USA	Inactive	
181	**Black Bart**		Windsor, California	6 USA	Active	
182	North Bay		North Bay, Ontario, Canada	5 Canada	Inactive	
183	Victoria		Victoria, British Columbia, Canada	5 Canada	Inactive	
184	Rochester		Rochester, New York	2 USA	Inactive	
185	Snake River Valley		Boise, Idaho	3 USA	Inactive	
186	Ventura		Ventura, California	6 USA	Inactive	
187	Northwest Montana		Kalispell, Montana	3 USA	Inactive	
188	Nathan Hale		New London, Connecticut	1 USA	Inactive	
189	**Kamloops**		Kamloops, British Columbia, Canada	5 Canada	Colony	
190	Hot Springs		Hot Springs, Arkansas	7 USA	Inactive	
191	South Saskatchewan		Regina, Saskatchewan, Canada	5 Canada	Inactive	
192	Evergreen		Long Island, New York	1 USA	Inactive	
193	Hawkeye		Cedar Rapids, Iowa	8 USA	Inactive	
194	Edmonton		Edmonton, Alberta, Canada	5 Canada	Inactive	
195	Semo		Cape Girardeau, Missouri	7 USA	Inactive	
196	Calgary		Calgary, Alberta, Canada	5 Canada	Inactive	
197	Raritan Valley		New Brunswick, New Jersey	1 USA	Inactive	
198	Northeast Colorado		Sterling, Colorado	6 USA	Inactive	
199	**Nutmeg**		Hartford, Connecticut	1 USA	Colony	
200	Midnight Sun		Anchorage, Alaska	5 Canada	Inactive	
201	Salina		Salina, Kansas	7 USA	Inactive	
202	Fort Meyers		Fort Meyers, Florida	9 USA	Inactive	
203	Wisconsin Valley		Wausau, Wisconsin	2 USA	Inactive	
204	Galveston County		Galveston, Texas	7 USA	Inactive	
205	Upper Vancouver Island		Port Alberni, British Columbia, Canada	5 Canada	Inactive	
206	Louisville		Louisville, Kentucky	2 USA	Inactive	
207	Austin		Austin, Texas	7 USA	Inactive	
208	**Okanagan**		Vernon, British Columbia, Canada	5 Canada	Colony	
209	San Fernando Valley		Van Nuys, California	6 USA	Inactive	
210	Northern Utah		Ogden, Utah	6 USA	Inactive	
211	Prince George		Prince George, British Columbia, Canada	5 Canada	Inactive	
212	Adelaide	1962	Adelaide, South Australia, Australia	4 Australia	Inactive	
213	Northern Iowa		Mason City, Iowa	8 USA	Inactive	
214	**Mt. Gambier**		Mount Gambier, South Australia, Australia	4 Australia	Active	
215	**Sydney**		Sydney, Australia	4 Australia	Active	
216	**Winema**		Klamath Falls, Oregon	3 USA	Active	
217	**Melbourne**		Melbourne, Australia	4 Australia	Active	
218	Brisbane		Brisbane, Queensland, Australia	4 Australia	Inactive	
219	Ottawa		Ottawa, Ontario, Canada	5 Canada	Inactive	
220	Paulina		Redmond, Oregon	3 USA	Inactive	
221	Brevard County		Cocoa, Florida	9 USA	Inactive	
222	Umpqua		Roseburg, Oregon	3 USA	Inactive	
223	Halifax Area		Daytona Beach, Floridia	9 USA	Inactive	
224	Hudson Valley		Newburg, New York	1 USA	Inactive	
225	Bay Area		Tampa, Florida	9 USA	Inactive	
225	Bay Area		St. Petersburg, Florida		Inactive	
226	Green Peter		Salem, Oregon	3 USA	Inactive	
227	Permian Basin		Midland, Texas	7 USA	Inactive	
228	Presque Isle		Erie, Pennsylvania	2 USA	Inactive	
229	**Cowichan Valley**		Duncan, British Columbia, Canada	5 Canada	Active	
230	**North Cascade**		Arlington, Washington	3 USA	Active	
231	Feather River		Oroville, California	6 USA	Inactive	
232	Canberra		Canberra, Australian Capital Territory, Australia	4 Australia	Inactive	
233	Conokalan		Omak, Washington	3 USA	Inactive	
234	Orange County		Orange County, California	6 USA	Inactive	
235	Hobart		Hobart, Tasmania, Australia	4 Australia	Inactive	
236	NE Victoria		Benalla, Victoria, Australia	4 Australia	Inactive	
237	Newcastle		Newcastle, New South Wales, Australia	4 Australia	Inactive	
238	N.E.W.		Colville, Washington	3 USA	Inactive	
239	**Launceston**		Launceston, Tasmania, Australia	4 Australia	Active	
240	Perth		Perth, West Australia, Australia	4 Australia	Inactive	
241	Coffs Harbour		Coffs Harbour, New South Wales, Australia	4 Australia	Inactive	
242	**Metroplex**		Dallas, Texas	7 USA	Colony	
243	Greensboro		Greensboro, North Carolina	9 USA	Inactive	
244	Elkhorn		Baker, Oregon	3 USA	Inactive	
245	Singapore		Singapore	4 Singapore	Inactive	
246	Saginaw		Flint, Michigan	2 USA	Inactive	
247	Syracuse		Syracuse, New York	2 USA	Inactive	
248	Auckland		Auckland, New Zealand	4 New Zealand	Inactive	
249	Timbertown		Wauchope, New South Wales, Australia	4 Australia	Inactive	
250	Manjimup		Manjimup, Western Australia, Australia	4 Australia	Inactive	
251	Wellington		Wellington, New Zealand	4 New Zealand	Inactive	
252	Vanimo		Vanimo, New Guinea	4 New Guinea	Inactive	
252	Vanimo		Port Morseby, New Guinea	4 New Guinea	Inactive	
253	Port Moresby		Port Moresby, New Guinea	4 New Guinea	Inactive	
254	Ragin Cagun		Lake Charles, Louisiana	7 USA	Inactive	
255	Suva		Suva, Fiji	4 Fiji	Inactive	
255	Suva		Rewa Province, Fiji	4 Fiji	Inactive	
256	**Ballarat**		Ballarat, Victoria, Australia	4 Australia	Active	
257	Gippsland		Gippsland, Victoria, Australia	4 Australia	Inactive	
258	Goose Lake		Lakeview, Oregon	3 USA	Inactive	
259	Centralia		Centralia, Washington	3 USA	Inactive	
260	Woy Woy		Gosford, New South Wales, Australia	4 Australia	Inactive	
261	**FNQ Cairns**		Cairns, Queensland, Australia	4 Australia	Active	
262	Oktoberfest		Kitchener, Ontario, Canada	5 Canada	Inactive	
262	Oktoberfest		Waterloo, Ontario, Canada	5 Canada	Inactive	
263	Southern		Christchurch, New Zealand	4 New Zealand	Inactive	
264	Geyserland		Rotorua, New Zealand	4 New Zealand	Inactive	
265	North Queensland		Townsville, Queensland, Australia	4 Australia	Inactive	
266	Portland		Portland, Victoria, Australia	4 Australia	Inactive	
267	Black Hills		Rapid City, South Dakota	8 USA	Inactive	
268	Mt. Olympus		Port Angeles, Washington	3 USA	Inactive	
269	NE Nebraska		Norfolk, Nebraska	8 USA	Inactive	
270	Maui		Kahului, Hawaii	3 USA	Inactive	
271	Sunshine State		Orlando, Florida	9 USA	Inactive	
272	**NW Tasmania**		Burnie, Tasmania, Australia	4 Australia	Active	
273	Charleston		Charleston, South Carolina	9 USA	Inactive	
274	**Leschenaultia**		Bunbury, Western Australia, Australia	4 Australia	Active	
275	**Malaysia**		Kuala Lumpur, Malaysia	4 Malaysia	Active	
276	Central West		Oberon, New South Wales, Australia	4 Australia	Inactive	
277	Maryborough-Wide Bay		Maryborough, Queensland, Australia	4 Australia	Inactive	
278	Rainbow		Johannesburg, South Africa	4 South Africa	Inactive	
279	Outenequia		Johannesburg, South Africa	4 South Africa	Inactive	
280	Disa		South Africa	4 South Africa	Inactive	
281	Sunrise		Johannesburg, South Africa	4 South Africa	Inactive	
282	Ethekweni		Durban, South Africa	4 South Africa	Inactive	
283	Perkumpulan Industri Kehutanan		Jakarta, Indonesia	4 Indonesia	Inactive	
