= Federal Medical Center, Butner =

United States federal prison

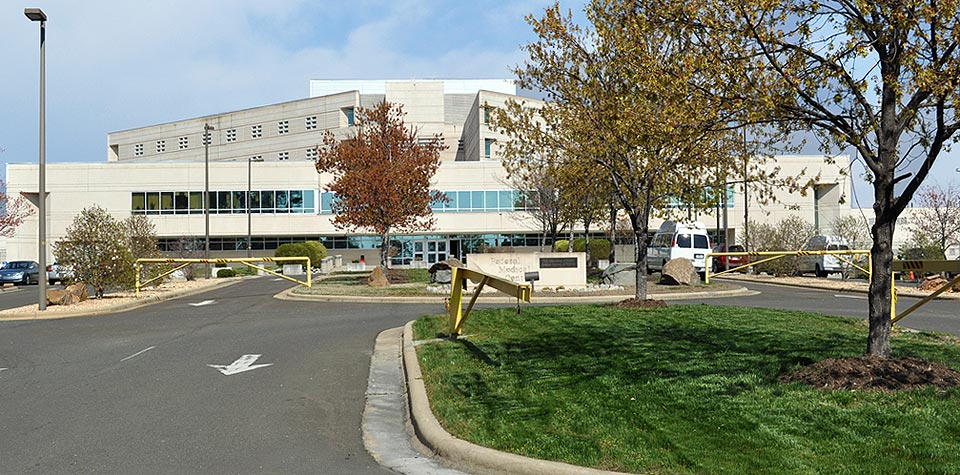
- Interactive map of Federal Medical Center, Butner
- Location: Durham County, North Carolina; 36.13753°N 78.81368°W
- Status: Operational
- Security class: All security levels (with adjacent camp for minimum-security inmates)
- Population: 775 (June 2023)
- Opened: 1995
- Managed by: Federal Bureau of Prisons

The Federal Medical Center, Butner (FMC Butner) is a United States federal prison opened in 1995 in North Carolina for male inmates of all security levels who have special health needs. It is part of the Butner Federal Correctional Complex and is operated by the Federal Bureau of Prisons, a division of the United States Department of Justice. An adjacent satellite prison camp houses minimum-security male inmates.

It is located in Mangum Township, Durham County, North Carolina, near Butner.

FMC Butner is located near the Research Triangle area of Durham, Raleigh, and Chapel Hill.

== Facility and programs ==
FMC Butner has a full hospital facility specializing in oncology and behavioral science. Many medical and surgical specialties hold clinics and perform procedures at the FMC. It has the only residential program devoted to the treatment of individuals convicted of sexual offenses in the federal prison system.

In 2009 Philip Fornaci, the director of the DC Prisoners' Project, stated that FMC Butner, along with FMC Carswell and FMC Rochester, "are clearly the 'gold standard' in terms of what BOP facilities can achieve in providing medical care" and that they had provided "excellent medical care, sometimes for extremely complex medical needs." However, in 2021, the Bureau of Prison's accreditation from the Joint Commission lapsed, raising concerns of a decline in the quality of medical care.

A 2023 NPR investigation found that from 2009–2020, roughly a quarter of all deaths in federal prisons occurred at the Butner Federal Correctional Complex. Due to bureaucratic delays in diagnoses and referrals, prisoners often arrive at FMC Butner with terminal conditions, only eligible for palliative care and compassionate release, despite the 1976 US Supreme Court case Estelle v. Gamble guaranteeing prisoners Eighth Amendment rights against deliberate indifference to their medical needs. Furthermore, vacancies in over 20% of nurse and paramedic positions at FMC Butner were linked to staff shortages and burnout.

== Butner study ==
In 2009, a study conducted by psychologists Michael Bourke and Andres Hernandez was published in the Journal of Family Violence. The results suggested a strong link between viewing child pornography and sexual abuse. The findings went against the conventional and widely held belief that a person passively viewing child pornography had an insignificant causal link with that person actually molesting a child.

In what is known as the "Butner Study," Bourke and Hernandez analyzed data on 155 men convicted of child pornography offenses, who took part in an 18-month treatment program between 2002 and 2005, during which the men filled out assessment measures including a "victims list," where they revealed the number of children they had molested in the past.

74% of the men denied molesting anyone when they were sentenced. However, by the end of treatment, 85% had admitted to sexually molesting a child at least once. The numbers are more than twice that of other studies. In explaining this discrepancy, Bourke said, "Our treatment team worked for an average of 18 months with each offender, and the environment was one of genuine therapeutic trust" that encouraged the men to tell the truth about themselves.

A critique of the study is that the use of a population of participants in the most intensive sex offender treatment program offered in the federal prison system skewed the sample. Offenders had to have received at least a thirty-six-month sentence to be eligible for the program. Melissa Hamilton argues, "These offenders may well, then, have represented particularly dangerous offenders who were a high risk to children since they had been prosecuted, convicted, given more than minimal prison sentences, and accepted into the limited-space program because of a perceived need by themselves and program clinicians for a lengthy and intensive residential program."

== Notable inmates ==
=== Current ===
Inmate Name	Register Number	Photo	Status	Details
Russell Weston Jr.	22372-016		Being held indefinitely; the Bureau of Prisons lists his status as "Hospital Treatment Completed."	Responsible for the 1998 United States Capitol shooting, during which he fatally shot Detective John Gibson and Officer Jacob Chestnut of the US Capitol Police and wounded a tourist. Weston was subsequently ruled mentally incompetent to stand trial.
John Russell Whitt	19945-057		Set to be released from federal custody on January 16, 2037.	Arrested and sentenced to federal prison for armed ATM robbery in 1999. In 2020, Whitt plead guilty to the 1998 murders of his wife and son; he was sentenced to 26 to 32 years in North Carolina state prison for each murder, to be served consecutively after his federal sentence concludes.

=== Former ===
Inmate Name	Register Number	Photo	Status	Details
Mohammad Shibin	78207-083		Died in custody on March 17, 2024.	Somali pirate leader; convicted in 2012 of piracy, kidnapping, and hostage-taking for acting as a ransom negotiator during the hijacking of the civilian vessel Quest in 2010 and the oil tanker Miranda Marguerite in 2011; Shibin is the highest-ranking pirate ever prosecuted.
Mike DeBardeleben	09671-074		Died in custody on January 26, 2011.	Kidnapper, rapist, counterfeiter, and suspected serial killer.
James von Brunn	07128-016		Died at FMC Butner while awaiting trial on January 6, 2010.	White supremacist and Holocaust denier who committed the 2009 United States Holocaust Memorial Museum shooting, during which Museum Security Guard Stephen T. Johns was killed.
Frank Calabrese Sr.	49955-079		Died at FMC Butner in 2012 while serving a life sentence.	Hitman for the Chicago Outfit Mafia organization; arrested as part of Operation Family Secrets; convicted in 2007 of racketeering conspiracy for directing and engaging in Mafia activities including murder, extortion and loansharking.
Salvatore DiMasi	27371-038		Served an 8-year sentence; released November 22, 2016.	Speaker of the Massachusetts House of Representatives from 2004 to 2009; convicted in 2011 of conspiracy, honest services fraud and extortion for steering contracts to the software company Cognos in exchange for $65,000 in kickbacks.
Omar Abdel-Rahman	34892-054		Served a life sentence under the name Omar Ahmad Rahman until his death on February 18, 2017.	Leader of the terrorist organization al-Gama'a al-Islamiyya; convicted in 1995 of seditious conspiracy for masterminding a foiled plot to bomb high-profile targets in New York City, as well as conspiring to assassinate Egyptian President Hosni Mubarak.
Tony Alamo	00305-112		Served a 175-year sentence under his actual name, Bernie Lazar Hoffman, until his death on May 2, 2017.	Cult leader from Arkansas; convicted in 2009 of ten counts of transporting minors across state lines for sexual purposes for using his influence to force children as young as 8 into marriages and sexual relationships.
Tom Manning	10373-016		Died at USP Hazelton in 2019.	Member of the United Freedom Front, a Marxist group which carried out bank robberies and bombings at corporate buildings, courthouses and military facilities in the 1970s and 1980s; convicted of the 1981 murder of NJ State Trooper Philip Lomonaco.
Harry Bowman	26595-039		Died in custody on March 3, 2019.	President of the Outlaws Motorcycle Club; convicted in 2001 of directing a racketeering enterprise which engaged in drug trafficking, extortion, murders and bombings; one of the FBI Ten Most Wanted Fugitives until his capture in 1999.
James Leon Guerrero	03744-045		Transferred to FCI Atlanta. Serving a life sentence.	Pleaded guilty to murdering Federal Correctional Officer Jose Rivera at the United States Penitentiary, Atwater on June 20, 2008; accomplice Jose Cabrera-Sablan also pleaded guilty and is serving a life sentence.
Joshua Ryne Goldberg	63197-018		Transferred to FCI Sandstone; released on April 1, 2024.	Pleaded guilty to attempting to bomb a Kansas City, Missouri 9/11 memorial event in 2015 while posing as an ISIS supporter.
Bernie Madoff	61727-054		Sentenced to 150 years; died at FMC Butner on April 14, 2021.	Financier who orchestrated the Madoff investment scandal, the largest known Ponzi scheme in history. In 2009, Madoff pleaded guilty to eleven felonies including securities fraud, mail fraud, wire fraud, money laundering, perjury, and false filings with the Securities and Exchange Commission.
Joe Exotic	26154-017		Transferred to FMC Lexington. Serving a 21-year sentence; scheduled for release on April 28, 2036.	Convicted in 2019 of animal abuse (eight violations of the Lacey Act and nine of the Endangered Species Act) and two counts of attempted murder for hire.
Theodore Kaczynski	04475-046		Sentenced to four life sentences; died by suicide at FMC Butner on June 10, 2023.	Known as the Unabomber; pleaded guilty in 1998 to building, transporting, and mailing explosives to carry out 16 bombings from 1978 to 1995 in a mail bombing campaign targeting those involved with modern technology, which killed 3 people and injured 23 others.
Amine El Khalifi	79748-083		Transferred to FCI Memphis. Serving a 30-year sentence; scheduled for release on September 9, 2037.	Pleaded guilty in 2012 to plotting to carry out a suicide bombing attack on the United States Capitol Building.
Jamil Addullah al-Amin	99974-555		Sentenced to life; died at FMC Butner on November 23, 2025.	Black Power activist and former SNCC chairman also known as H. Rap Brown. In 2000, al-Amin was convicted of the fatal shooting of a Fulton County, Georgia deputy sheriff.

== See also ==
- List of U.S. federal prisons
- Federal Bureau of Prisons
- Incarceration in the United States
