= Mike DeBardeleben =

American criminal (1940–2011)

- Born: James Mitchell DeBardeleben Jr. March 20, 1940; Little Rock, Arkansas, U.S.
- Died: January 26, 2011 (aged 70); FMC Butner, Durham County, North Carolina, U.S.
- Other name: The Mall Passer
- Penalty: 375 years imprisonment

Details
- Victims: 6+ survived 4+ murders suspected

James Mitchell "Mike" DeBardeleben Jr. (March 20, 1940 – January 26, 2011) was an American convicted kidnapper, rapist, counterfeiter, and suspected serial killer who became known as the Mall Passer due to his practice of passing counterfeit bills in shopping malls bordering interstate highways across the United States. FBI profiler Roy Hazelwood said DeBardeleben was the best-documented sexual sadist since the Marquis de Sade, and one of America's most dangerous known criminals.

In personality, DeBardeleben displayed marked schizoid and narcissistic traits, along with symptoms of psychopathy. He also exemplified all eight of the outdated DSM-III-R criteria for sadistic personality disorder. DeBardeleben was characterized as having a "Jekyll and Hyde" personality, whose demeanor could shift from affable to extremely cruel. The DSM-IV cites DeBardeleben as an example of both sexual sadism and antisocial personality disorder.

After his arrest for counterfeiting, the Secret Service found evidence linking him to a series of sex crimes; he was tried, found guilty and sentenced to 375 years in federal prison. Although he was never brought to trial for murder, he was the principal suspect in two homicides, and he remains a suspect in several others. He died of pneumonia at the Federal Medical Center in Butner, North Carolina, in early 2011.

== Background ==
Mike DeBardeleben was born on March 20, 1940, in Little Rock, Arkansas, the second of three children born to James Mitchell DeBardeleben Sr. and Mary Lou DeBardeleben (née Edwards). The DeBardelebens were a military family who moved frequently. After the attack on Pearl Harbor, James DeBardeleben Sr. took a commission as a lieutenant in the United States Army, and was posted to Washington, D.C., for the duration of World War II. DeBardeleben younger brother, Ralph, later became a U.S. Army paratrooper.

In 1945, the family moved to Austin, Texas, and James Sr. was shipped out to the South Pacific for nine months. In 1949, the family moved briefly to Kentucky before relocating to Frankfurt, Germany. In 1950, James Sr. was promoted to lieutenant colonel, and the family moved to The Hague in the Netherlands, where James Sr. served for two years as a military adviser for the U.S. Embassy. In 1953, James Sr. retired from the army, and took a federal civil service post in Albany, New York.

The marriage between DeBardeleben's parents was unstable, and both had many extramarital affairs. At one point, his parents had considered divorce, but ultimately chose to stay married for the sake of the children. DeBardeleben's mother was sexually promiscuous and an emotionally unstable alcoholic, whose behavior could become violent. His mother often neglected the children when her husband was away. Mike's sister, Linda, became a caretaker for her younger brothers. It was during this period that DeBardeleben began to develop a deep hatred of his mother, which would eventually crystallize into a hatred of women in general.

As a child, DeBardeleben was subjected to considerable abuse and neglect. His father was a punitive man who was very critical of his children and almost never praised them for their accomplishments. When DeBardeleben was younger, his father would punish him by holding his head underwater in a bathtub as well as switching him. According to his siblings, these punishments began before he was old enough to attend school.

Even from an early age, DeBardeleben was a quiet loner, detached from the other children. According to his own account and that of his sister, he preferred solitary activities and spent a great deal of time drawing and sketching in his room. These sorts of activities became an escape for him and a way to express himself, from which he "derived much inner satisfaction".

In adolescence, DeBardeleben began to exhibit antisocial behavior and aggressiveness toward others. In 1956, at the age of 16, DeBardeleben physically assaulted his mother for the first time. He is also alleged to have threatened his mother at times with a hatchet or a letter opener. On September 8, he purchased two handguns and ammunition with a friend. Later that month, he was arrested and convicted of his first felony, possessing a concealed firearm. This arrest was the first of many that followed, on sodomy, attempted murder, kidnapping, and other charges.

== Adult life and death ==
In early 1957, DeBardeleben was expelled from Peter Schuyler High School, which effectively ended his formal education. In October of that year, he enlisted in the U.S. Air Force and was stationed at the Lackland Air Force Base in Texas. After only a year, he was court-martialed for disorderly behavior and sentenced to two months in the base stockade. In 1958, he was ordered to see a psychiatrist for counseling after he was pronounced AWOL several times. At the age of 18, he was discharged from the Air Force and moved in with relatives in Fort Worth, Texas.

In 1959, DeBardeleben attempted school again, enrolling in R. L. Paschal High School, but after three months was expelled. In August of that year, he married his first wife, Linda Weir, but three weeks later separated from her. Also, that month, he was arrested for attempted robbery with an accomplice, followed two weeks later by his involvement in a string of auto thefts, and was sentenced to five years' probation. In October, he fathered a premature stillborn daughter with an unidentified woman.

DeBardeleben later met Charlotte Weber, who was 17. At the time, DeBardeleben lived at home with his parents, terrorising his family. Both of his parents feared him and deemed him capable of killing them. Weber recalls how DeBardeleben's family endured violent outbursts in which he "lit fires in his room" and "kicked doors in". Nonetheless, Weber described DeBardeleben as a "handsome young rebel" with whom she was "enthralled".

In March 1960, he impregnated Charlotte and on June 9, married her. On December 12, 1960, Charlotte gave birth to their daughter, Bethene. Charlotte described him as preoccupied with vanity and being apathetic but not abusive. Later wives described how DeBardeleben tortured and abused them. DeBardeleben fathered a second child with Charlotte, but was forced by her parents to give the child up for adoption.

On August 12, 1961, his 19-year-old brother Ralph, who was home on leave from the Army but staying in a motel due to an argument with DeBardeleben, committed suicide in a church parking lot by asphyxiating himself with his car exhaust. He had stated to his sister that he intended not to return when his leave was up; DeBardeleben later blamed his brother's suicide on severe depression arising from rigorous paratrooper training, a girlfriend rejecting him, and, as the underlying cause, the same deprived home environment that he claimed created him.

DeBardeleben attended two different universities in Texas in the summer of 1961 despite lacking a high school diploma, soon after divorcing Charlotte. But the following year, his probation was revoked, and he was jailed. DeBardeleben moved back in with his parents after being released, and he immediately started violently beating his mother once more. His health started to deteriorate at this point, and he started acting more aggressively. DeBardeleben was brought to Western State Hospital in Staunton, Virginia for a psychological assessment in March 1964 after his parents alerted the authorities. DeBardeleben was later labelled as "sociopathic" and clinicians opined that he would be a poor candidate for psychotherapy.

DeBardeleben began seeing Wanda Faye Davis, who was six years younger than him, soon after they met. The two eventually were married in September 1964. Later, she would describe him as charming, well-groomed, and intelligent. Ultimately, DeBardeleben got Davis to agree to having naked pictures taken of her engaging in a variety of sadistic sex acts with him. Later, he used these to threaten her into helping him commit various crimes as his accomplice.

DeBardeleben disclosed his grotesque sexual fantasies and openly discussed his urges to torture and kill women to Davis. Davis later told the Secret Service; "His greatest thing that he could have ever thought about was to abduct a woman, torture her, have various sex-activities go on, strangle her and watch her die or blow her brains out with a gun. Then he would hide her so that if she was ever found there would be no evidence of who had done it and it would be the perfect crime."

DeBardeleben was arrested in 1966 for kidnapping and sodomising a young girl, a crime he committed with Davis's male cousin. This was DeBardeleben's first known sexual offence. But after the jury discovered that the victim had gotten into the car with the two men voluntarily, the charges were ultimately withdrawn. Two times within a short period of time, Davis fell pregnant with DeBardeleben's child; the first pregnancy ended in a miscarriage after DeBardeleben shoved her down a flight of stairs. They were already divorced when she gave birth to his daughter, Lindsey.

When he married Caryn, his fourth wife, she was twelve years his junior. When Secret Service agents searched DeBardeleben's home after his first arrest for counterfeiting in 1976, they discovered a printing press, as well as a collection of dildos, whips, vibrators, and a stack of five-by-seven cards containing the names, addresses, measurements, and physical characteristics of numerous women. His house also had amateur sadomasochistic pornography all over the walls. Evidence found led to him being convicted and sentenced to the Federal Correctional Institution, Danbury where DeBardeleben's intelligence quotient was determined to be approximately 127.

During his imprisonment he wrote; "I feel that I have been unjustly tormented, degraded and shit upon by society (specifically the American Justice System-which is rotten to the core). In order to regain an adequate self-image, I feel compelled to somehow restore my self-respect. If I were to shit upon society for an adequate monetary gain, commensurate with the pain I have suffered and not get caught, it would accomplish my objective." In 1978, after spending time at a halfway house, DeBardeleben moved to Arlington, Virginia, where he purchased a 1977 Ford Thunderbird to resume his criminal activity. At the same time, a misunderstanding at the Crime Information Center led authorities to conclude that DeBardeleben had recently died.

== Crimes ==
From 1979 to 1983, the United States Secret Service believed they had found a geographical pattern to a string of counterfeiting cases and were tracking the distribution of counterfeit $20 bills across thirty-eight states. The Secret Service started receiving allegations of bogus $20 bills being circulated in eastern states in 1979 from bank tellers and store owners. All of the notes had the same flaws, which suggested that they all came from the same source. The counterfeiter, known as the "Mall Passer," would use the fake money to pay for an inexpensive item and pocket the change for a profit.

The authorities distributed composite sketches to store clerks in 1982, when the offender was earning $130,000 a year, equivalent to $433,707 in 2025, based on their projections of his future behavior. If this person handed the staff a $20 bill, they were told to call the police. This led to DeBardeleben's arrest at Maryville, Tennessee. In DeBardeleben's car, more counterfeit $20 bills were found, each labelled with the city in which they would be passed. Also, DeBardeleben's driver's license read Roger Blanchard, but the car he had left at the mall was registered to James Jones, so the authorities had to use fingerprints to positively identify him.

Following a thorough search of DeBardeleben's home, a storage unit that DeBardeleben used was located using a folded white piece of paper that was designated in the yellow pages which contained information on a storage unit. The storage facility was then quickly searched for fake printing plates. Photographs showing women being raped and killed were discovered while authorities were looking for the tools DeBardeleben used to make the notes. A kill kit including handcuffs, shoelaces, chains, whips, and K-Y Jelly was also discovered, along with homemade audiotapes of rape and torture, and sets of women's underwear.

FBI profilers speculated that in photographs where his face was seen along with the victim's, he murdered the woman and disposed of her body; whereas in photographs where he was hiding his face, he allowed the victim to live. Most of the forty different women shown in his photograph collection have never been identified. DeBardeleben recorded torturing one victim as he pressed a burning cigar against her back, in which he stated, "Describe the pain, how does it hurt? Just exactly how does it hurt? I want you to tell me that you’re fascinated by the pain." The victim being tortured was ultimately identified as 20-year-old Laurie Jensen.

DeBardeleben appeared in court on his own behalf, and during cross-examination, he made one of his victims sit through an audio recording of her abuse. Debardeleben also accidentally implicated himself when he described the car and the incident in great detail while questioning the woman about being pulled into the car by her attacker. He was found guilty of several offenses and given a cumulative sentence of 375 years in federal prison. On January 26, 2011, DeBardeleben died of pneumonia at the Federal Medical Center in North Carolina.

Debardeleben was the subject of FBI FILES: CRUEL DECEPTION, chronicling the secret service investigation into him.

In his 2009 book The Anatomy of Evil, forensic psychiatrist Michael H. Stone analyzes the case of DeBardeleben as among those on the top tier of his scale of evil.

== Alleged victims ==
The precise number of DeBardeleben's victims will never be known. DeBardeleben steadfastly resisted admitting guilt and refrained from boasting about any of his crimes. The following are individuals whom authorities strongly suspect were likely victims of DeBardeleben:

- 52-year-old realtor Edna Terry Macdonald left her office on April 29, 1971, to travel to Barrington, Rhode Island for an evening meeting with a "Mr. Peter Morgan." She was discovered dead and hanging from a basement rafter the following day in the house she had been showing. There was no indication of robbery or rape as a motive; instead, she had been strangled with her stockings. Until a comparable crime was connected to DeBardeleben years later, police had no leads at all. DeBardeleben was charged but not tried for Macdonald's murder.
- Lucy Alexander, 19-year-old nursing student, was kidnapped by DeBardeleben from Georgetown, Delaware on March 9, 1978. He subjected her to multiple acts of rape and sodomy, made her perform fellatio on him, and the following day in Delaware, released her in a remote location.
- 31-year-old realtor Elizabeth Mason agreed to show a man numerous residences in Fayetteville, North Carolina on April 2, 1979. He took out a gun and started pistol-whipping Mason inside one of the homes they had been touring. He smashed her skull against the floor, tied her up and strangled her until she passed out. Her assailant had taken her car and underwear when she awoke. She had not been sexually attacked despite being partially undressed.
- On January 6, 1979, 20-year-old Laurie Jensen was returning home at night after working at a convenience shop in Ocean City, Maryland when she was requested to get in a car by DeBardeleben who appeared to be a law enforcement official. She was questioned about a robbery by DeBardeleben, who handcuffed her. She was blindfolded and subjected to both rape and violence for three days while being locked in a closet.
- DeBardeleben pulled over 25-year-old Diane Overton, a lone driver, on January 11, 1980, at 4 a.m. while posing as a police officer on a quiet residential road. When he tried to rape her, Overton bit his hand and yelled for help. She kicked the gear stick of his car as he attempted to force her into his vehicle, stopping the engine. DeBardeleben jumped into the driver's seat and repeatedly tried to run her over before eventually giving up.
- On December 11, 1980, DeBardeleben entered a clothing store and approached 27-year-old Maria Santini, the cashier, brandishing a revolver. She had to hunch over in the footwell of his car as he drove her to his house after carrying her outside. He hogtied her there, took pictures of her, and then raped her.
- 37-year-old Jean McPhaul, a prominent realtor from Bossier City, Louisiana, vanished on April 27, 1982, after accompanying a "Dr. Zack" to view a property. She was found hanging from a rafter in the attic the following morning. She had not been raped, but she had been stabbed twice in the chest and strangled. A neighbour had seen "Dr. Zack" arrive at the residence and provided police with enough information to create a composite sketch that appeared to closely resemble DeBardeleben. A list of aliases DeBardeleben planned to use for his illegal activities, including the moniker "Dr. Zack," was found in his private diary entries. DeBardeleben was charged but not tried for this crime.
- On May 20, 1982, 17-year-old Kellie Marie Brownlee and her boyfriend took the bus to their high school, but Kellie skipped classes and subsequently hitchhiked to the Twelve Oaks Mall in Novi, Michigan, where she made multiple job applications. At the mall, a friend's mother spotted her and offered to drive her home, but Kellie turned down the offer. She was last seen at this location, and DeBardeleben has been accused of being involved in her disappearance. DeBardeleben reportedly preferred hitchhikers and brunette women, both of which matched Kellie's description. Brownlee's mother was provided with photos belonging to DeBardeleben in an effort to help identify Kellie, but she was unsuccessful. Since then, DeBardeleben has been ruled out as a suspect.
- On April 13, 1983, 42-year-olds Joe Rapini and David Starr returned home from work at a local Columbia Savings Bank in Greece, New York to discover a masked burglar, who held them at gunpoint. He kidnapped Rapini and demanded that Starr visit a bank to get a $70,000 ransom. Starr proposed the first half of the ransom and was instructed to leave it next to a burned-out building. The ransom was later collected by a woman driving a white automobile. Even though Starr did everything he could to follow his orders, Rapini was found shot to death in his car later that day. Despite disparities in DeBardeleben's normal modus operandi, he was linked to this case by his journal entries.

== See also ==
- List of serial killers in the United States
