= Zemaitis Guitars =

Guitar brand

Zemaitis
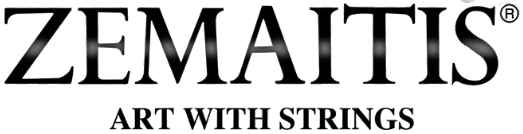
- Product type: Musical instruments
- Current owner: Kanda Shokai Corp. (2010)
- Country: Japan
- Introduced: 1955; 71 years ago in London, England
- Related brands: Greco
- Markets: Japan, United States
- Previous owners: Tony Zemaitis
- Registered as a trademark in: United States, Feb 9, 2010
- Website: zemaitisguitarcompany.com

Zemaitis Guitar is a guitar brand owned by Japanese Kanda Shokai Corporation, which manufactures the instruments in Tokyo. Kanda Shokai is also owner of Greco, another guitar brand.

Zemaitis's guitars are based on designs by British luthier Tony Zemaitis, who died in 2002. In the United States, Zemaitis is distributed by the "Zemaitis Guitar Company" based out of Paso Robles, California. Current products by Zemaitis include electric and acoustic guitars.

Zemaitis is globally known for its unique metal and pearl front guitar designs. The brand's slogan is "The Elements of Tone".

== History ==
Born Antanus Casimere Zemaitis, of Lithuanian descent, Tony Zemaitis (as he is known to his friends), began a five-year apprenticeship as a cabinetmaker in 1951. He repaired his first guitar in 1952 and built his first instrument, a classical guitar, in 1955. Zemaitis started to build guitars for his friends, selling them the instruments at lower prices. After completing his National Service, Zemaitis improved his manufacturing methods. His instruments became popular among blues and folk music musicians of London, gaining a good reputation. During the 1960s, Zemaitis made 12-string guitars for notable musicians including Ralph McTell, Spencer Davis, Eric Clapton and Jimi Hendrix.

After starting to build acoustic guitars, Zemaitis began to manufacture electric models, with some prototypes used by George Harrison. Other musicians that asked Zemaitis for guitars were Marc Bolan, Ron Wood and Ronnie Lane.

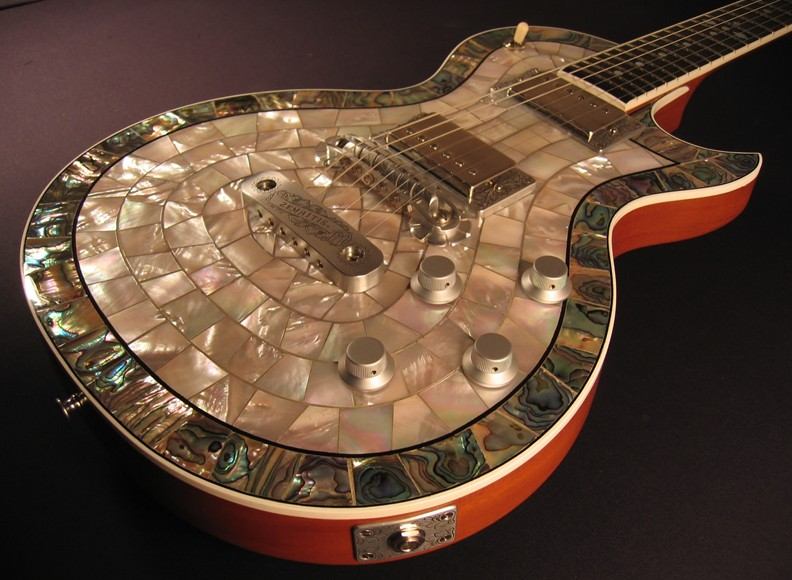
Pearl front guitar

Zemaitis' characteristic metal front guitar was designed to reduce the humming of his electric guitars. His first metal-front was made for Tony McPhee, of The Groundhogs in the late 1960s. Inspiration for metal-fronts came for his observation of Fender guitars, which he considered to have design faults relating to the position of the pickups in relation to the strings. Zemaitis took the model from a radio magazine, where he noted that every unit had a metal chassis with the components mounted on it. Applying that principle to his guitar, he produced the first metal-front guitar.

Metal front guitars also featured engraved designs made by his friend and customer Danny O'Brien, who had started engraving plates for guitar headstocks until Zemaitis suggested O'Brien engrave the fronts as well. Zemaitis' guitars became popular among rock artists and consolidated as a landmark of Zemaitis guitars. In the mid-1970s, Zemaitis made his first "mother of pearl" fronts for Ronnie Wood and James Honeyman-Scott.

== Notable players ==
Zemaitis has had many notable players use their guitars throughout the years such as Ronnie Wood, James Hetfield, Ronnie Lane, Keith Richards, Rich Robinson, Keith Nelson and Gilby Clark. In his later years, Zemaitis worked with a variety of influential guitarists like Joe Louis Walker, Christian Martucci, Ashes, Clay Cook and Ken Mochikoshi.

- Donovan
- Jimi Hendrix
- Keith Richards
- Ronnie Wood
- Bobby Womack
- Andy McCoy (Hanoi Rocks)
- Greg Lake
- Tetsu Yamauchi
- George Harrison
- Eric Clapton
- Ronnie Lane (Faces)
- Mary Hopkin
- Paul McCartney
- Joe Walsh
- Ann Wilson
- Bob Dylan
- Marc Bolan
- David Gilmour
- Peter Frampton
- Steve Harley
- James Honeyman-Scott (The Pretenders)
- Richie Sambora (Bon Jovi)
- Gary Grainger (Rod Stewart)
- Simon Hinkler (The Mission)
- Rick Parfitt
- Dave Sharp (The Alarm)
- Charlie Starr (Blackberry Smoke)
- James Hetfield (Metallica)
- Rich Robinson (The Black Crowes)
- Miku Kobato (Band-Maid)
- Geddy Lee (Rush)
- Yoshi (Aldious)
- Mike Oldfield
- Tom Keifer
- Jim Cregan
- Dave Dalton (band) Screaming Bloody Marys
- John Corabi
- Yutaka Higuchi (Buck-Tick)
