= Harry Bowman =

American outlaw biker and gangster (1949–2019)

FBI Ten Most Wanted Fugitive
- Charges: Racketeering (RICO); Drug trafficking; Explosives violations; Firearms violations

Description
- Born: Harry Joseph Bowman; July 17, 1949; Marysville, Michigan, U.S.
- Died: March 3, 2019 (aged 69); Butner, North Carolina, U.S.
- Occupation: Outlaw biker; crime boss

Status
- Penalty: Two life sentences plus 83 years
- Added: March 14, 1998
- Caught: June 7, 1999
- Number: 453
- Captured

Harry Joseph Bowman (July 17, 1949 – March 3, 2019), also known as "Taco", was an American outlaw biker and gang leader who served as the international president of the Outlaws Motorcycle Club between 1984 and 1999. During his tenure as president, the club had chapters in more than 30 cities in the United States and some 20 chapters in at least four other countries.

Considered one the most notorious motorcycle gang leaders in U.S. history, Bowman escalated a biker war between the Outlaws and the Hells Angels in the Midwest by ordering a series of audacious acts of violence against rivals during the early-to-mid-1990s. He became the 453rd fugitive listed on the Federal Bureau of Investigation (FBI) Ten Most Wanted Fugitives list after he was indicted on federal racketeering and murder charges in August 1997. After 15 months as a fugitive, Bowman was apprehended by the FBI in a Detroit suburb in June 1999. He was convicted in Tampa, Florida in April 2001 of the murders of gang members, bombings of rival gangs' clubhouses and businesses, racketeering, conspiracy and various drug and firearm offenses. Bowman was sentenced to serve two life prison sentences plus 83 years. He died of cancer at the Federal Medical Center, Butner at the age of 69 on March 3, 2019.

== Early life ==
One of five children of Geraldine (née Kramp; 1922–2012) and Hiram Joseph Bowman (1912–1970), he was born in Marysville, Michigan on July 17, 1949. His mother worked as an accountant for the United States government. Bowman was raised on a farm on Range Road in St. Clair Township and graduated from Port Huron Catholic High School. Captain James Carmody of the Port Huron Police, who also attended Port Huron Catholic High, said of Bowman and his brothers: "They had a tough upbringing and they had a reputation as being tough guys". Another former schoolmate remembered Bowman as being "quite friendly". St. Clair County Sheriff Dan Lane described "Harry Joe" as "an all-right kid". Bowman was arrested twice by Port Huron police for disorderly conduct in the 1960s. He received the nickname "Taco" because of his dark complexion and resemblance to a person of Hispanic descent.

== Outlaws ==
Bowman was affiliated with the Devils Diciples before joining the Outlaws. He became the president of the Detroit chapter of the Outlaws in 1970. A protégé of the Outlaws' Dayton, Ohio-based national president Harold "Stairway Harry" Henderson, Bowman also served as leader of the club's "North" region and became the national vice president in the late 1970s. By that time, the Outlaws had become one of the largest motorcycle gangs in the United States and were involved in various illegal activities, although members often also ran legitimate businesses. The Outlaws cornered the market for amphetamines and topless dancers in the cities they operated in. Under Bowman's leadership, the Detroit Outlaws were the most senior of the approximately 35 biker gangs in the city, specializing in drug trafficking, prostitution, extortion, gambling and bombings. The Detroit Partnership also began outsourcing enforcement work to the club, with Francesco "Frankie the Bomb" Bommarito acting as the Mafia's emissary to the outlaw biker milieu in Southeast Michigan.

In June 1975, an alliance was formed between the Outlaws and Satan's Choice, the largest biker gang in Canada. Under the terms of the agreement, the Outlaws were the exclusive distributors in the United States of the PCP and methamphetamine manufactured by Satan's Choice members in Northern Ontario. In turn, firearms from the U.S. were trafficked into Canada. Another advantage of the alliance was a "fugitive exchange program", in which Outlaws members fleeing American law enforcement could be harbored by Satan's Choice in Canada, and fugitive Choice bikers could take refuge with the Outlaws in the U.S. Bowman spent time hiding out with the Kitchener Satan's Choice chapter under the mutual aid pact. He was present at the Kitchener chapter clubhouse when Satan's Choice member Lorne Campbell almost got into a fight with an Outlaws biker from Nashville in a dispute over a mutual girlfriend. Campbell threatened to throw the Outlaw down a staircase but, following biker protocol, sent for Bowman before doing so. Bowman was able to mollify Campbell and save the Outlaw from harm. Campbell later characterized Bowman as "a nice guy".

As the liaison between the Outlaws and Satan's Choice, the Detroit chapter became an important and powerful faction in the Outlaws organization. Bowman was instrumental in the Outlaws' development into an international club by "patching over" several Satan's Choice chapters. He courted Garnet "Mother" McEwen, the St. Catharines Satan's Choice chapter president who advocated for "Yankeeization" of his club, during several visits by McEwen to the U.S. Members of the Detroit Outlaws were invited by McEwen to provide intimidation at a meeting in Crystal Beach, Ontario on July 1, 1977, at which eight of the thirteen Satan's Choice chapters defected to join the Outlaws.

According to Philip Reich of the Detroit Police Department motorcycle gang unit, who first encountered Bowman in 1980: "At the time, he lived in the Outlaws clubhouse [on the east side of Detroit], but he hung out in a topless bar called the Please Station, a little hole in the wall on Seven Mile, just west of Van Dyke. Taco went there quite a bit; in those days, a lot of the bikers were agents to the strippers." Reich described Bowman as "a very interesting, bright guy" and said of him: "I can't say I admired what he did for a living, but I admired his leadership abilities." In addition to illegal enterprises, Bowman and the Detroit Outlaws also ran a motorcycle repair facility and a T-shirt shop in the Eastern Market. One popular T-shirt design that Bowman sold featured two pistols pointing at the Renaissance Center with the caption: "Visit Detroit, Murder City." Another design worn and distributed by Bowman proclaimed: "Snitches are a dying breed", an Outlaws motto.

On March 3, 1982, Bowman allegedly killed 38-year-old Arthur Allen "Good Old Speed" Vincent, a probationary member of the Dayton Outlaws, for "running his mouth" at an Outlaws party during Daytona Beach Bike Week in Daytona Beach, Florida. Vincent was last seen entering a car with Bowman, Raymond "Roach" Ravalee and another Outlaw after bragging about crimes. He was then shot execution-style in the back of the head. Vincent's decomposing body was discovered on March 8, 1982, by a Florida Power & Light crew in a ditch in a wooded area on Old Tomoka Road in Ormond Beach near Interstate 95. An autopsy revealed he had died by homicide. The murder remains unsolved.

=== International president ===
Bowman succeeded Harry Henderson as Outlaws international president after his mentor resigned due to ongoing legal issues, and he was appointed the club's leader at a summit in Joliet, Illinois in February 1984. He relocated the Outlaws' international headquarters from Chicago to Detroit and conducted his presidential activities from the Detroit chapter's fortified clubhouse on Warren Avenue, overseeing various matters, from setting the club's policies regarding rival motorcycle gangs to monitoring the activities of members. Upon his ascendency to the Outlaws presidency, Bowman moved to the affluent Detroit suburb of Grosse Pointe Farms, where he lived with his wife and three daughters, Kellie, Krystin and Kortney, who he enrolled in expensive local private schools. Eschewing the stereotypical long-haired, bearded biker image, he was generally clean shaven, sporting neatly coiffed hair and was known to wear expensive suits. Bowman travelled in a custom-made, armor-plated Cadillac automobile and was usually accompanied by at least one armed bodyguard. Federal Bureau of Investigation (FBI) agent Bill Randall said that Bowman "went against the grain and kept one foot in the straight world and the other in the biker world, while most of those guys want to stay as far away from the two-car garage and picket fence thing as possible". By the early 1990s, Bowman maintained dual residency in Michigan and Florida. In addition to his wife and a mistress in Detroit, he also had numerous girlfriends across the country.

Bowman developed a reputation as a formidable, ruthless and inventive, but discreet crime boss. He was "dead set" against publicity for himself or his club. Law enforcement described Bowman as the first "businessman biker boss" and credited him with pioneering the Outlaws' foray into more sophisticated rackets and diverse business ventures beyond traditional motorcycle gang fronts such as bars, strip clubs and tattoo parlors. One key policy decision of his was to augment the club's drug and prostitution operations with gambling, loansharking and extortion. Bowman forged ties with Italian and Eastern European crime groups as well as influential members of legitimate society, including philanthropists, politicians, judges and policemen. He also built a sophisticated counterintelligence network by having Outlaws members collect search warrant affidavits and newspaper clippings that provided details on law enforcement efforts against the club, and attend trials to gather information on witnesses against the Outlaws.

A charismatic leader who showed genuine affection for his clubmates, Bowman inspired a devout loyalty from his underlings, which made it difficult for investigators to infiltrate his operations or develop informants inside his inner-circle. He typically wore a full-length black cape embroidered with a swastika while holding club meetings. Bowman was also prone to psychotic outbursts, mood swings and paranoia. He was both a user and distributor of narcotics who dealt cocaine, marijuana and Valium to other Outlaws members. According to his bodyguard Christopher "Slasher" Maiale, Bowman "could stay awake for days at a time".

Early in his presidency in 1984, Bowman ordered the murder of a former member of the Chicago Outlaws after becoming concerned that the ex-biker would reveal the whereabouts of a fugitive club member, and he assigned Toledo, Ohio chapter vice president Wayne "Joe Black" Hicks to carry out the execution. Although Hicks failed to complete the assignment because he was unable to locate the former Outlaw, his dedication impressed Bowman, who subsequently transferred Hicks to the Fort Lauderdale chapter in order to revive the club's faltering South Florida faction. The Fort Lauderdale Outlaws had gone rogue, refusing to follow orders from Detroit, skimming profits, and partaking in ever-increasing drug use. Under Hicks' management, Fort Lauderdale was revived and reclaimed its status as the Outlaws' strongest chapter after Detroit and Chicago. Hicks served as Bowman's right-hand man throughout most of his presidency.

During Bowman's tenure as Outlaws president, the club's membership reached a high of over 1,500, with chapters in over 30 United States cities and another 20 chapters internationally. The Outlaws' expansionism brought the club into conflict with the Hells Angels, with whom they were in competition for members and territory. During the 1980s, the Outlaws and the Hells Angels were at war over control of the methamphetamine trade in the U.S. and Canada. In 1988, Bowman met with Hells Angels leaders to negotiate safe routes for members of both clubs to attend the federal courthouse in Louisville, Kentucky, where ten Hells Angels members were standing trial accused of conspiring to bomb the Outlaws' clubhouse in the Portland neighborhood of Louisville. During the negotiations, Bowman learned that Raymond "Bear" Chaffin, a former Outlaw and member of the Warlocks in Central Florida, had been contacting the Hells Angels in an attempt to have the Warlocks join the Angels.

Over the course of several meetings with Detroit Partnership boss Jack Tocco in 1989, Bowman established an alliance with the Mafia. As part of the coalition, the Outlaws partnered with the Detroit crime family in loansharking, gambling operations, and narcotics deals. Outlaws members and mafiosi began collaborating in rackets which were operated from a series of biker bars in Metro Detroit.

After Wayne Hicks became the Outlaws' Florida regional president in 1990, he reported to Bowman that club member Alan "Greaser" Wolfe had testified before a grand jury. Bowman then ordered Hicks to "take care" of the situation; Wolfe was beaten by Hicks and another Outlaw and expelled from the club. Shortly afterwards, a conflict emerged between the Outlaws and the Warlocks, who had begun selling drugs in Florida on behalf of the Hells Angels. After learning that the Warlocks' Edgewater chapter was being led by former Outlaws member Raymond Chaffin, Bowman ordered Hicks to kill Chaffin. Hicks, in turn, directed Fort Lauderdale chapter president Houston "Part Time" Murphy and prospective club member Alex "Dirt" Ankerich to carry out the murder. After gathering intelligence on their target, Ankerich and Murphy traveled to Edgewater on February 21, 1991, and Ankerich fatally shot 44-year-old Chaffin four times in the back of the head with a silencer-equipped .22 caliber pistol as he worked on a motorcycle in his garage. Chaffin's body was discovered by his 12-year-old daughter when she returned home from school. Bowman and Hicks agreed to present themselves in public at the time of the murder in order to establish an alibi. Ankerich was subsequently presented with full Outlaws "colors" and an "SS" patch awarded to members who have committed murder or attempted murder on the club's behalf.

In 1991, Bowman and the Outlaws caused a dispute with the Detroit Partnership after the bikers began extorting Lebanese racketeers who were running a string of floating craps games and who had traditionally paid protection money to the Mafia in order to operate without interference. When the dice game organizers opted to pay the Outlaws instead, the mobster Jack "Jackie the Kid" Giacalone responded by assigning enforcers Paul "Big Paulie" Corrado and Nove Tocco to murder Bowman. Unable to find the opportunity to kill Bowman, Corrado and Tocco grew frustrated and suspicious about Giacalone's motives behind the would-be assassination. After Tocco sought counsel from other mafiosi, including his father, Paul, brother, Joe, and uncle, Anthony "Tony Z" Zerilli, the underboss of the Detroit Mafia, a conversation in which he and Corrado mused over the murder plot as they drove by Bowman's home on the morning of April 23, 1991 was intercepted by an FBI listening device planted in Tocco's car.

After convincing Bowman that he wasn't being lured into a trap by the FBI, federal agents met with Bowman in a parking lot on the east side of Detroit to warn him of the threat to his life. According to testimony from Nove Tocco, who later turned government witness after a federal racketeering conviction, he and Corrado were prevented from carrying out the murder by Jack Tocco after they presented their plan to kill Bowman to Paul Corrado's uncle, Anthony "Tony the Bull" Corrado, a caporegime. Bowman ultimately acquiesced his control of the gambling rackets, and the contract on his life was rescinded after Frank Bommarito brokered a "sitdown" between Bowman and Anthony "Tony Jack" Giacalone, the Detroit Partnership's street boss and uncle of Jack Giacalone. The Mafia, in turn, began sharing with the Outlaws an increased percentage of the profits from drug and loansharking rackets in which the crime family and the bikers colluded.

During Bike Week in Daytona Beach in March 1992, Bowman directed the kidnapping and beating of Irwin "Hitler" Nissen, a club probate who had gotten into a physical altercation with Atlanta Outlaws chapter president James "Moose" McClean at a bar the previous afternoon. Nissen was taken to Bowman's motel room, where he was assaulted, threatened with a knife and warned he would be killed if he ever struck an Outlaws officer again by Bowman along with fellow Outlaws Houston Murphy, Dennis "Dog" Hall and Christopher Maiale. Nissen was then pushed off of a three-story balcony by Murphy, which resulted in severe injuries to Nissen.

The following year, another Florida Outlaw, Kevin "Turbo" Talley, incensed Bowman by signing a statement by Canadian officials admitting that the Outlaws were a criminal organization. Talley had been arrested while visiting an Outlaws chapter in Ontario and was deported to Massachusetts, where a warrant for him was outstanding. Bowman then ordered Hicks to have Talley report to Detroit. Upon his arrival at Detroit Metropolitan Airport, Talley was met by two Outlaws bikers and escorted to the Detroit chapter clubhouse, where he was detained in an isolated room for five days, beaten and sodomized. Bowman and Hicks eventually arrived in Detroit and told Talley of their disapproval of his cooperation with the Canadian authorities. Afterwards, Hicks sent Talley back to Florida, where he planned on expelling him from the club. Believing his life was in danger, Talley instead resigned his Outlaws membership.

=== War against the Hells Angels ===
The Outlaws' longstanding rivalry with the Hells Angels saw a resurgence as a result of Bowman's feud with Hells Angels leader Sonny Barger. Detroit policeman Philip Reich described the conflict as "an ongoing thing over who had the better club", saying: "It was like the Hatfields and McCoys. They hated each other". The Hells Angels, the largest motorcycle gang in the United States, were based primarily on the West Coast and in the Northeast, while the Outlaws were the predominant biker gang in the Midwest. In an attempt to quell the increasing tensions between the clubs, Bowman twice hosted peace talks with George Christie, a national officer in the Hells Angels, in Florida, firstly in December 1992 and again in May 1993. According to Christie, he and Bowman were working towards a peace treaty when the Outlaws leader withdrew from the negotiations. Christie believed Bowman was persuaded to abandon a truce with the Hells Angels by one of his lieutenants, Kevin "Spike" O'Neill, who thought agreeing to a ceasefire would make the Outlaws appear weak.

Ahead of a Pro Stock Motorcycle drag race in Milwaukee in June 1993 at which Patrick "Pat" Matter, the president of the Minneapolis Hells Angels chapter, was expected to compete in full Hells Angels "colors", Bowman led a contingent of 25 to 30 Outlaws in confronting Matter. Bowman took offence to Hells Angels wearing their biker vests in Milwaukee, a city considered Outlaws territory, and arrived at Matter's motel in a Lincoln automobile with a bodyguard wielding a MAC-10 submachine gun, leading to an armed standoff with a group of Hells Angels who were positioned on the second floor of the motel. The Outlaws leader warned Matter that if he took part in the race while wearing his Hells Angels patch, he would "have a problem". Matter initially declared his refusal to acquiesce to the Outlaws' demands, but later reconsidered on the advice of Sonny Barger and East Coast Hells Angels president Kevin "K.C." Cleary.

In late 1993, Outlaws leaders came to suspect that the Hells Angels were attempting to gain a presence in the Chicago area by "patching over" the Hell's Henchmen, a biker gang with chapters in Chicago, Rockford, Calument City, and South Bend, Indiana. Initially a small club consisting of approximately twenty members, the Hell's Henchmen had co-existed with the Outlaws without violence as they showed no ambitions to expand. The Outlaws became alarmed, however, when the Hell's Henchmen carried out a forced amalgamation of the Devil's Ushers gang on the West Side of Chicago. When the Outlaws attempted to coerce the Hell's Henchmen into "patching over", the Henchmen held a meeting with the Hells Angels in Indiana and agreed to "prospect" for the Angels instead.

Pat Matter was the orchestrator of the Hells Angels' expansion into Illinois and Indiana. Bowman ordered Matter's assassination, and a hit squad consisting of James "Preacher" Schneider, Scott "Rhino" Hammond and Randall "Madman" Miller of the Outlaws' Milwaukee and Janesville, Wisconsin chapters traveled to Minnesota to carry out surveillance on Matter ahead of a planned execution after they were provided with money, a weapon, and surveillance notes by Milwaukee chapter president Edward "Shock" Anastas. The Outlaws were unsuccessful in carrying out the killing, however, because the hit team never "got a shot at" Matter. Several months later, on December 15, 1993, Outlaws members attempted a car bomb attack on Matter outside his custom motorcycle business, Minneapolis Custom Cycle. The attempt failed when the C-4 bomb detonated prematurely, destroying Matter's truck and injuring the biker who planted the explosive.

On December 31, 1993, Bowman gave a speech to hundreds of senior Outlaws members at a New Year's Eve party at a Fort Lauderdale hotel suite, announcing that the club would be escalating hostilities against the Hells Angels and their supporters in the coming year and demanding his followers carry out attacks around the country. He urged the Outlaws to be "rottener" than ever before in their actions, and allegedly placed $100,000 bounties on the lives of Sonny Barger and George Christie. Bowman's speech came exactly twenty years after the beginning of the Outlaws–Angels war, which started after Outlaws members in Florida murdered three Hells Angels bikers in retaliation for the beating of an Outlaw at a New Year's Eve party in New York City on December 31, 1973. The decision was overwhelmingly well received and in 1994, the Outlaws conducted an increased number of attacks against rival gangs.

A contingent of Outlaws attended the "Summer Madness" motorcycle rally at the Illiana Motor Speedway in Schererville, Indiana on June 26, 1994. The night before the event, Bowman met with the attending Outlaws leaders, including Gary, Indiana chapter president Randy "Mad" Yager, and gave the order to attack members of the Invaders, a biker gang who customarily attended the event and who the Outlaws suspected were affiliated with the Hells Angels, at the speedway the following day. To carry out the attack, the Outlaws planned to use a "war wagon", a vehicle modified with steel plating and several gun ports and equipped with firearms and other weapons. Worried about the safety of her boyfriend, an Outlaws member's girlfriend alerted the Gary police of the arranged violence, and the police in turn warned the Invaders not to attend the event. The motorcycle rally passed without incident as the Invaders failed to appear at the speedway. As the procession of Outlaws were leaving the event, police stopped the armored van, seizing guns, ammunition and smoke grenades, and arresting six Outlaws from Milwaukee. Knowing they had become targets of the Outlaws, the Invaders disbanded, with some members joining the Hells Angels and the rest retiring from crime.

During a visit to Illinois in the spring of 1994, Bowman complained to Chicago Outlaws chapter president Peter "Greased Lightning" Rogers about the presence in the area of the Hell's Henchmen. Rogers was hesitant to take action against the rival gang, however, because he feared any incidents may draw the attention of federal authorities, and so Bowman assigned Wayne Hicks, Houston Murphy and Buffalo, New York chapter member Walter "Buffalo Wally" Posnjak to carry out surveillance on the Hell's Henchmen's Chicago headquarters. During one such reconnaissance mission, Murphy observed Hells Angels memorabilia on the premises. At a meeting at Bowman's residence in Detroit in September 1994, Bowman gave permission to Chicago Outlaw Carl "Jammin' Jay" Warneke and Gary member Randy Yager to bomb the Hell's Henchmen clubhouse.

At 6 pm on November 7, 1994, Kevin O'Neill, the president of the "Stateline" chapter in Janesville, and Gary chapter president Raymond "Shemp" Morgan Jr. detonated a 100 pounds (45 kg) C-4 car bomb in a 1989 Ford Taurus sedan outside the building, which was located at 1734 West Grand Avenue. No casualties were reported, although a steel door to the clubhouse was damaged and windows on a number of buildings and parked cars in the area were shattered. The attack was the third-largest car bombing in United States history, surpassed only by the 1993 World Trade Center bombing and the Oklahoma City bombing of 1995. The Hell's Henchmen "patched over" to the Hells Angels on December 10, 1994. At 8 pm on December 16, 1994, the Grand Avenue clubhouse went up in flames after being doused in petrol and was subsequently condemned and put up for sale. A group of around 40 Outlaws bikers celebrated by visiting the site and giving it the finger. The Chicago Hells Angels subsequently relocated to the city's southern suburbs.

Wally Posnjak, the president of the Outlaws' "Northeast" region, and Michael "Mad Mike" Quale, the former Rochester Hells Angels chapter president, were killed during a brawl at the Lancaster National Speedway in Lancaster, New York on September 25, 1994. Bowman rode his motorcycle at the front of Posnjak's funeral procession in Buffalo on September 29, 1994. A newspaper photograph then circulated of a member of the Fifth Chapter biker club hugging a Hells Angel at Quale's funeral, which took place in Rochester on October 1, 1994. The Fifth Chapter were a family-oriented club made up of men and women who were recovering from substance abuse problems. The club had five chapters – three in Florida, one in New England, and one in the San Francisco Bay Area – and sought to be neutral, maintaining good relationships with all motorcycle clubs. A close friend of the slain Outlaw Posnjak, Bowman was incensed by what he perceived to be disrespect and betrayal from the Fifth Chapter, and he ordered Wayne Hicks to shut down the club's Florida faction.

On December 2, 1994, fourteen members of the Fifth Chapter accepted an invitation from Stephen "DK" Lemunyon of the Outlaws' Daytona chapter to attend the Outlaws clubhouse in Orlando. The Fifth Chapter bikers were searched as they entered the compound, and once inside, they were seated around two picnic tables and surrounded by armed Outlaws. Lemunyon displayed the newspaper photograph which had infuriated Bowman and then began beating Fifth Chapter national president Mike Malone with a flashlight as the rest of the club's members were held at gunpoint. After being informed by Lemunyon that they could no longer exist as a club and ordered to remove their "colors", the Fifth Chapter members complied with the instructions before being attacked with bats and chains. Following the mass beating, the Fifth Chapter members were allowed to wash themselves and were told to return home without congregating or visiting hospitals and then mail any Fifth Chapter memorabilia in their homes to the Outlaws. One Fifth Chapter member who suffered a broken arm was unable to ride his motorcycle correctly, however, and informed police of the beating he had suffered after crashing into a car.

As a result of a tip-off from a corrupt police officer, Bowman became aware of Gary Outlaws chapter sergeant-at-arms Donald "Big Don" Fogg's status as a police informant and announced at a club meeting in Chicago in late 1994 that Fogg would be killed and his death would be disguised as an assassination by a rival gang. Fogg was allegedly one of two Outlaws who fatally stabbed Hells Angel Mike Quale at the Lancaster speedway brawl and he was questioned about the murder after he and three other Indiana Outlaws travelling in a car were stopped by New York State Police on the New York State Thruway at Fredonia while in possession of Quale's bloodied Hells Angels "colors" on the day of the killing. On January 28, 1995, 34-year-old Fogg was executed via three gunshots to the back of the head, and his body was found in a pickup truck in a vacant lot near the Outlaws clubhouse on the east side of Gary. Fogg received an Outlaws funeral, which was held in nearby Portage over two days in February 1995 and attended by club members from around the country, including Bowman and Gary chapter president Randy Yager. At the funeral, a rumor was circulated that Fogg had been shot by a policeman interested in the biker's girlfriend, although the Outlaws expressed no desire to seek revenge.

Due to Bowman's insistence that the Outlaws rid Florida of the Warlocks, Wayne Hicks asked Stephen Lemunyon to determine a method of destroying the Warlocks' clubhouse in Orlando. After a period of surveillance, Lemunyon and two other Outlaws, Steve "Stevo" Hilton and Louis Musher, detonated an explosive device at the Warlocks' Orlando headquarters on October 18, 1994, leveling the building. Another plot by Lemunyon, Musher, Hilton and Robert "Broda" Gunther to firebomb a Warlocks clubhouse in Brevard County was foiled by an FBI operation against the Daytona Outlaws. On February 27, 1995, the FBI raided the Daytona chapter's headquarters and arrested sixteen members on racketeering, conspiracy and arson charges. A bomb identical to the one used in Orlando which was constructed by Lemunyon was seized during a search of Lemunyon's residence.

At a meeting of regional Outlaws presidents, Bowman criticized one club leader, Michael "Mad Mike" Markham, for failing to take action against the Hells Angels in his territory. Markham was reluctant to move against the Angels as the two clubs had peacefully coexisted in his region. At the suggestion of one of his underlings, Harold "Bullwinkle" Brewington, Markham instead advised attacking the Hells Angels in their home state of California. Bowman held another New Year's Eve summit on December 31, 1994, hosting a meeting of Outlaws officers in Detroit. Apparently taking the advice of Markham, he declared that the Outlaws would wage war against the Angels on the West Coast. Brewington and Houston Murphy were selected to travel to California and carry out surveillance on Sonny Barger and George Christie. Murphy was uncomfortable with Brewington, however, and made the trip alone in early 1995, staying in Ventura for four days, where he located and mapped out Christie's residence. He then returned to Florida but was directed by Bowman to take the map to Tennessee following the racketeering indictment against the Daytona Outlaws in February 1995. Murphy presented his report to Bowman at a meeting in Tennessee, and Bowman subsequently dispatched a team of Outlaws headed by Wayne Hicks to Los Angeles to follow up on Murphy's findings. Three members of an Outlaws hit squad were arrested in Ventura after federal agents intercepted details of the Christie murder plot on a wiretap. Although the Outlaws failed to assassinate Christie or Barger, a number of Hells Angels-owned businesses in Southern California were firebombed.

The turf war between the Outlaws and the Hells Angels ended in the spring of 1995 after national Outlaws leaders became concerned about the escalating violence in the Midwest and the resulting heightened surveillance on the club by federal authorities. According to the Chicago Crime Commission, the gangs signed a peace agreement in 1996. As per the accord, the Hells Angels capitulated in their attempt to establish a chapter within the Chicago city limits, but were permitted by the Outlaws to retain their chapter based in the suburb of Harvey.

=== FBI's Most Wanted ===
On November 14, 1996, Wayne Hicks and Houston Murphy were among ten Outlaws members arrested after being indicted on federal racketeering charges. The indictments were the culmination of Operation Silverspoke, a six-year Drug Enforcement Administration (DEA) investigation into murders, robberies, bombings, drug trafficking, extortion and witness intimidation carried out by the Outlaws in Florida. Facing the possibility of life imprisonment, Hicks and Murphy turned state's evidence and testified against various Outlaws members, including Bowman. According to Maryland State Police biker gang expert Lieutenant Terry Katz, Hicks became the "highest ranking Outlaw in its national organization to cooperate" with federal prosecutors. Katz described the significance of Hicks' cooperation as: "In the world of motorcycle gangs, this is like Sammy "The Bull" Gravano telling all he knows about John Gotti".

Bowman was indicted on ten counts – four of Racketeer Influenced and Corrupt Organizations Act (RICO) violations; four of drug trafficking; one of explosives violations; and another of illegal firearm possession – by the U.S. Attorney's Office for the Middle District of Florida in 1997. In August 1997, FBI agents raided Bowman's residence in Grosse Pointe Farms but were unable to serve the indictment against him, which was unsealed by a federal grand jury in Tampa nearly two weeks later. Bowman became a fugitive from justice over the next eighteen months, moving between a series of safehouses across the country with the aid of various Outlaws chapters as well as his contacts in the Detroit Mafia. During his time as a fugitive, Bowman was deputized as Outlaws international president by James "Big Frank" Wheeler of the club's Indianapolis chapter.

On March 14, 1998, Bowman was added to the FBI Ten Most Wanted Fugitives list, with federal authorities offering a $50,000 reward for information leading to his arrest. He was profiled on America's Most Wanted. Although his notoriety in biker circles rivaled that of Sonny Barger, Bowman had kept a low profile among the general public during his criminal career prior to his listing on the most wanted list. The FBI reported Bowman's aliases as: Harry Bouman; David Bowman; Harry J. Bowman; Harry Joe Bowman; David Charles Dowman; Harry Douman; Harry Tyree; "Taco"; and "T". He was described as 5'10" and 190 pounds, with multiple tattoos reflecting his association with the Outlaws Motorcycle Club, such as one on his back and upper right arm of a skull and crossed pistons with the word "Outlaws" in black above and the word "Detroit" in black below. He also had a swastika tattoo on his right forearm, and a "Merlin the Magician" figure on his left forearm. The FBI suspected that Bowman may have crossed the border into Canada and fled overseas, and alerted local police agencies that he could be harbored by any of the 50 Outlaws chapters in five countries. In their search for Bowman, federal agents unsuccessfully raided Outlaws clubhouses in St. Petersburg, Tampa, and other locations in Florida.

In the spring of 1999, Bowman was pulled over by the Nevada State Police for speeding while driving on a highway near Las Vegas. Travelling in the company of a young blonde woman in a Mercedes-Benz convertible, he was let go by police after producing false identification. When Bowman's true identity was discovered, footage of the traffic stop recorded by the police cruiser dashcam was sent to the FBI in Michigan. Federal agents then showed a still frame of Bowman and his female companion from the footage to Bowman's mistress in Detroit. Enraged that he was with another woman, she alerted the FBI that Bowman would be returning to Detroit the following week, to relay orders to his subordinate in person as he was careful to avoid using telephones, and disclosed the location of his upcoming meeting. At approximately 9:15 pm on June 7, 1999, Bowman was taken into custody without incident at a home on Griggs Drive in the Detroit suburb of Sterling Heights. He was socializing with senior Outlaws members in the backyard of the house when around 40 FBI agents, SWAT team members and Sterling Heights police officers surrounded the residence. An FBI crisis negotiator made a phone call to the home where they had learned Bowman was residing and persuaded him to surrender peacefully. FBI Director Louis Freeh acknowledged in a statement that Bowman was apprehended after a tip from a member of the public. The following day, Bowman appeared in federal court in Detroit and waived his right to a hearing in Michigan, telling U.S. Magistrate Marc Goldman "This indictment is like trash". He was ordered extradited to Florida to stand trial.

James Wheeler formally succeeded Bowman as leader of the Outlaws in the weeks following his capture when he was voted in as the club's international president during a meeting of Outlaw administrators in Florida. Wheeler subsequently relocated the club's international headquarters from Detroit to Tampa.

=== Trial and imprisonment ===
Bowman went on trial in Tampa beginning on March 19, 2001, on ten counts involving crimes committed between 1980 and 1997. He was represented by noted defense attorney Henry Gonzalez of Tampa. Bowman wore spectacles and a dark suit and sported styled hair throughout his trial. Due to prior incidents of the Outlaws attempting to interfere with judicial proceedings by intimidating witnesses, the court sua sponte decided to empanel an anonymous jury, withholding jurors' names, addresses, and places of employment. Despite Bowman's objections, the identities of the jury remained classified throughout his trial. Courthouse security was also increased; additional guards were placed in the courtroom, visitors were required to pass through metal detectors, and the judge banned Bowman from handling any sharp objects, ordering him to use felt-tipped pens. Despite the anticipation of an Outlaws presence, no club members attended the trial.

The prosecutors representing the federal government, Terry Furr and Stephen Kunz, asserted that Bowman had sought to claim Florida and other states as Outlaws territory and ordered murders and other acts of violence against informants and rival biker gangs in a "campaign of terror". In presenting their case, Assistant U.S. District Attorney Furr stated: "Bowman is the head of a worldwide organization and has been for 20 years. It has existed for many years because of a code of silence and a code of vengeance." Over fifty witnesses, including former Outlaws members Wayne Hicks, Houston Murphy and Kevin Talley, testified against Bowman. The majority of the ex-Outlaws who testified for the prosecution were transported to the courthouse from prisons, having agreed to give evidence in exchange for reduced sentences for murder, rape, drug trafficking and other crimes.

The defense team maintained that Bowman was simply the leader of a motorcycle club and was the victim of rogue members who committed crimes without his knowledge or permission. Bowman's attorney contended that it was in fact local chapter leaders who orchestrated murders and bombings. Ten witnesses, including Bowman's elderly mother, were called by the defense. In an attempt to demonstrate a common purpose among the various Outlaws chapters, federal prosecutors introduced in court seized copies of the Outlaws bylaws containing the provision that only white males may be members of the club. Bowman objected to the documents being shown, arguing that the admission of the Outlaws' whites-only policy was inflammatory and prejudicial as he was not charged with any racially motivated crimes. The court refused to redact the policy from the copies of the constitution on display.

On April 17, 2001, after a month-long trial, Bowman was convicted on eight counts – four counts of violating the RICO Act via thirteen acts of racketeering, including the murders of Raymond Chaffin and Don Fogg, the kidnappings of Irwin Nissen and Kevin Talley, the bombings of Warlocks and Hell's Henchmen clubhouses, the assault on the Fifth Chapter, and conspiracy to murder members of rival gangs; three counts of opium, cocaine, methamphetamine, marijuana and Valium distribution; and one count of possessing a .45 caliber semiautomatic pistol as a convicted felon. He was acquitted on an arson charge. Graham Brink of the Tampa Bay Times wrote that Bowman "took the news that he was about to spend the rest of his life behind bars with the casual cool that he has displayed throughout his monthlong trial." He became the 29th member of the Outlaws to be convicted in Florida since 1995. On July 27, 2001, Bowman was sentenced to two terms of life imprisonment, three terms of 20 years, two terms of 10 years, and one term of 3 years, to run concurrently, by James S. Moody Jr., Judge of the U.S. District Court for the Middle District of Florida. Additionally, Moody ordered Bowman to pay $18,000 in restitution to Chaffin's widow. The judge waived a potential $2 million fine. Bowman declined the opportunity to say anything on his own behalf before he was sentenced, and simply smiled and shook his lawyer's hand at the end of his sentencing hearing.

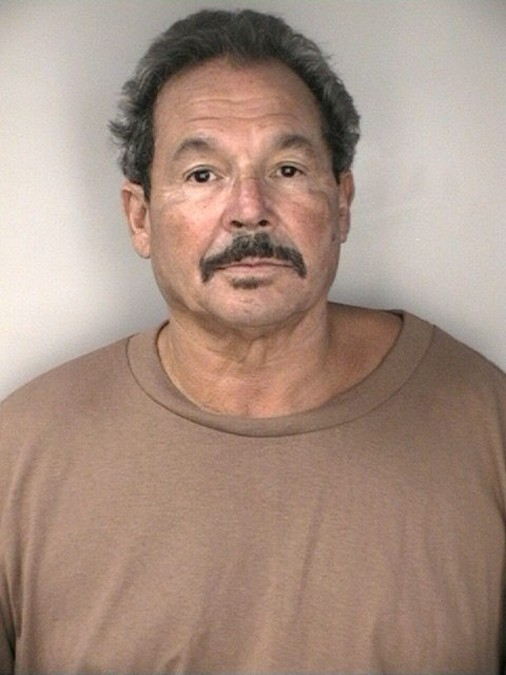
Bowman in a prison mugshot.

Imprisoned at the Federal Correctional Complex, Coleman in central Florida, Bowman appealed his convictions, contending that the district court erred by refusing to disclose the juror's names and by refusing to redact part the Outlaws' constitution to eliminate the whites-only membership policy. He also challenged the sufficiency of the evidence. When he was seeking assistance on appeal strategies, Bowman contacted George Christie and asked his permission to hire Christie's daughter, Moriya, as his attorney, to which Christie consented. On August 20, 2002, the U.S. Court of Appeals for the Eleventh Circuit upheld Bowman's convictions.

Daytona Beach Police Department detective Mickey Powers speculated that Bowman's influence over the Outlaws had been terminated by his imprisonment and that his time "ruling the roost" had come to an end. The FBI agent Tim Donovan, who was part of the investigation against Bowman, surmised that the club would continue to operate as a viable criminal enterprise despite his conviction, stating: "Sadly, there is always someone to take their place". The Outlaws were weakened by Bowman's absence, however, particularly in his hometown of Detroit, where much of his organization was dismantled in the late 1990s. The seat of power within the Outlaws subsequently shifted back to the club's traditional headquarters in Chicago. James Wheeler, who succeeded him as the international president of the Outlaws, was described by the crime reporter Scott Burnstein as "a considerably less successful leader than Bowman". Leroy "Black Region Roy" Frasier, a former Bay City chapter president, filled the power vacuum left by Bowman in Michigan. The Highwaymen overtook the Outlaws as the largest and most powerful motorcycle gang in the Detroit area at the beginning of the 21st century, and the Outlaws' ties to the Detroit Partnership were weakened when Frank Bommarito – who served as the Mafia's liaison to the club and had helped hide Bowman while he was a fugitive – was demoted from his post as a mob capo by the newly appointed family boss Jack Giacalone in 2012. David "Davey Donuts" Aceto, who took over Bommarito's crew, reportedly lacked the connections to the biker scene on the east side of Detroit that his predecessor had.

== Death ==
Bowman died from cancer at the Federal Medical Center in Butner, North Carolina on March 3, 2019, at the age of 69. An impromptu memorial service for Bowman at his former Detroit chapter compound the following day drew approximately 5,000 people. He was laid to rest at Bear Creek Cemetery in Dayton, Ohio on March 16, 2019. Bowman had chosen to be buried at Bear Creek as it was the final resting place of many of his "Outlaw brothers". Around 2,500 people, including Outlaws members from dozens of U.S. states and internationally, as well as crime figures from across the country, attended Bowman's funeral service at the Montgomery County Fair Grounds. The venue of the fairgrounds was required to host the funeral in order to accommodate the large number of mourners. Plainclothes officers from a number of police agencies and task forces were in attendance to observe the funeral. Columbus Division of Police intelligence unit detective Mark Lovett said of the spectacle: "This is one of those events that really only happen once in our career, to see something this big."

== See also ==
- List of fugitives from justice who disappeared
