= Mangum Township, Durham County, North Carolina =

Township in Durham County, North Carolina, U.S.

Coordinates: 36°09′55″N 78°52′57″W

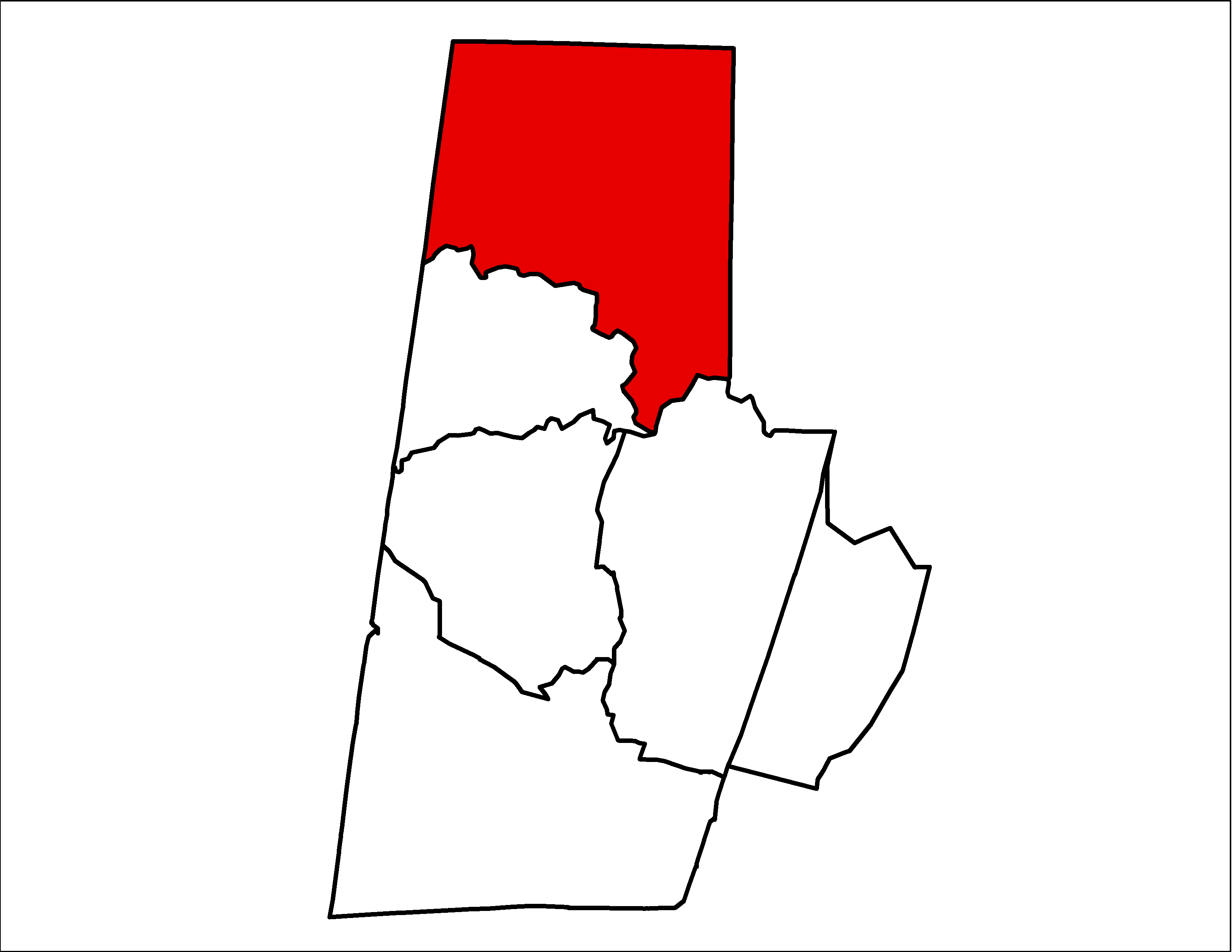
Location of Mangum Township in Durham County, N.C.

Mangum Township is one of six townships in Durham County, North Carolina, United States. The township had a population of 5,821 according to the 2000 census.

Geographically, Mangum Township occupies 71.57 square miles (185.4 km^{2}) in northern Durham County. The township contains small portions of the city of Durham, as well as the unincorporated communities of Bahama and Rougemont.

It includes a portion of the Federal Bureau of Prisons Federal Correctional Complex, Butner.
