= Murder of Bobby Whitt and Myoung Hwa Cho =

Two formerly unidentified murder victims who were killed in 1998

Bobby Whitt and Myoung Hwa Cho
Bobby Whitt

Myoung Hwa Cho
- Born: Myoung Hwa Cho; January 27, 1954; Robert Adam Whitt; January 7, 1988
- Disappeared: Concord, North Carolina
- Died: Cho: May 12, 1998 (aged 44); Whitt: July 29, 1998 (aged 10)
- Cause of death: Homicide by asphyxiation (Cho); Homicide by strangulation (Whitt)
- Body discovered: May 12, 1998; Spartanburg, South Carolina (Cho); September 25, 1998; Mebane, North Carolina (Whitt)
- Known for: Formerly unidentified murder victims

Robert "Bobby" Adam Whitt and Myoung Hwa Cho were two formerly unidentified murder victims who were killed in 1998. They remained unidentified until they were both identified using GEDmatch in early 2019. While unidentified, Whitt was nicknamed Mebane Child and the Boy Under the Billboard.

== Discovery ==
On May 13, 1998, the nude body of an Asian female was found on the side of a road parallel to Interstate 85 in Spartanburg, South Carolina. The victim had been bound at the wrists, with ligature marks present upon her discovery. An autopsy determined her cause of death as suffocation.

On September 25, 1998, a landscaping crew cutting grass under a billboard along Industrial Drive along Interstate 85/40 in Mebane, North Carolina, discovered the skeletal remains of a young boy. There was no sign of trauma at the scene and was likely that the child was killed elsewhere. The child was wearing khaki shorts, white socks and matching underwear, and black and white shoes that appeared to have been purchased recently. His shorts pocket was found to contain $50. The child had straight, dark brown hair about 3 to 4 inches in length, likely had a light brown to fair complexion, and likely had brown eyes. The boy was initially thought to have been Hispanic and possibly a migrant worker. The boy had no fillings, but preventative dental sealing in multiple teeth, as well as a slight overbite with erupting upper canines, which may have been noticeable when he smiled or spoke. The boy likely died during the spring or summer of 1998.

== Investigation ==
Sketches of the decedents were created in attempts to identify them, but to no avail. The boy's case received wider attention. Through the use of forensic palynology and isotope analysis, it was determined that the boy was originally from the southeastern United States, particularly Alabama and Georgia. Forensic artist Frank Bender created a clay reconstruction in 2010. The boy's case was also given to the National Center for Missing and Exploited Children, where they created multiple reconstructions using CG technology.

In October 2018, 20 years after the boy's discovery, more details about the boy's case were released. The cause of death was determined to be strangulation, and through further genetic testing determined that the boy was not of Hispanic descent, but was biracial; being of European and East Asian descent. The details also narrowed the time of death to be around June or July 1998. Additional photographs of the crime scene were also released to the public.

== Identification ==
In December 2018, Dr. Barbara Rae-Venter, known for her work in identifying the Golden State Killer, reviewed the boy's latest DNA tests, and matched his DNA to the DNA of a relative who submitted the information into the GEDmatch database. After contacting the relative, a first cousin from Hawaii, the relative confirmed the identity of the boy as Robert Adam "Bobby" Whitt. Whitt's extended family, who lived in Ohio, did not report Whitt missing because they were under the assumption that he had been sent to live with his mother in her native South Korea. Based on this information, investigators suspected that Whitt's mother had also been killed. Shortly thereafter, the National Center for Missing & Exploited Children (NCMEC) helped investigators find the case of an unidentified woman found in Spartanburg County, South Carolina, matching the description of Whitt's mother. After a DNA comparison, the unidentified woman was identified as Myoung Hwa Cho.

Shortly after Whitt and Cho's identifications, Whitt's father, John Russell Whitt, who was serving a prison sentence for armed robbery in Federal Correctional Institution, Ashland, and was not scheduled for release until 2037, confessed to the murders of Whitt and Cho. It is believed that Whitt killed Cho in Concord on May 12, 1998, and dumped her body in Spartanburg. According to Whitt's indictment, it alleges that Bobby was killed on July 29, 1998, in Concord and was dumped in Mebane. Police are determining whether the jurisdiction lies in North Carolina or South Carolina. In May 2019, a grand jury in Orange County, North Carolina, indicted Whitt on first-degree murder charges in Bobby's murder as well as charges for the concealment of his murder. Charges for Cho's murder are still being determined. Both Whitt and Cho's remains were cremated and sent to living relatives in Ohio. A formal funeral was held by family members for mother and son on May 18, 2019. The two were laid to rest together in Mt Orab, Ohio.

== Legal proceedings ==
John Russell Whitt pleaded guilty on January 15, 2020, to two charges of second degree murder and two charges of concealment of death in the case and was sentenced to 26 to 32 years for each murder, to be served consecutively after he completes his sentence in federal prison for robbery in 2037. During his sentencing hearing, he begged for forgiveness, saying he had been haunted by the murder for years and had tried to kill himself in prison out of guilt in 2001. Whitt has now been moved to Federal Correctional Complex, Butner.

== See also ==
- List of solved missing person cases
