= Al Parish =

American economist

Al Parish (born in the late-1950s) is a former Charleston Southern University economist and business professor, who was sentenced to federal prison after pleading guilty to financial fraud. Nearly 300 people lost up to $66 million invested in Parish Economic's private investment funds.

== Early Career and "Economan" Persona ==
Before being charged with fraud, Parish was known as a flamboyant local financial expert dubbed 'Economan'. He gained notoriety for his extravagant lifestyle, including a $1.2 million pen collection, featuring a $170,000 diamond-encrusted pen.

== The Fraud Scheme ==
Parish orchestrated a Ponzi scheme through his company, Parish Economics. He falsified investment statements and used new investors' money to pay returns to earlier investors. The fraud included over $4 million set aside for Athletic Facilities improvements at Charleston Southern University.

== Legal Proceedings and Sentencing ==
Parish began serving a 24-year sentence in the summer of 2008 after pleading guilty to orchestrating a Ponzi scheme, admitting to swindling investors out of nearly $90 million. He was ordered to pay restitution of $66.8 million. Investigators believe they will recover $9–15 million for investors, but the investigation has cost more than $2 million.

He served his sentence at Butner Federal Correctional Complex outside of Raleigh, North Carolina along with inmates such as Bernard Madoff, another high-profile financial fraudster.

== Compassionate Release ==
After serving about half his sentence, Parish was granted a "compassionate release" on March 17, 2021, due to a number of chronic health conditions and the risk of severe illness from coronavirus, according to an order by U.S. District Judge Richard Gergel. Al Parish was released from federal prison on March 24, 2021.

Court documents reveal that Al Parish initially filed for compassionate release on April 10, 2020, citing the combined risk of COVID-19 and his chronic medical conditions as extraordinary and compelling reasons for compassionate release. However, this initial request was denied by the court, which determined that Parish's medical conditions at that time did not meet the threshold requirements for compassionate release.

Parish moved for reconsideration after contracting COVID-19. The court later reversed its decision upon discovering he was suffering from Stage 3B chronic kidney disease, allowing his release.

== Aftermath and Impact ==
The Al Parish case had a significant impact on the Charleston community and highlighted the need for increased scrutiny of investment advisors. Many of Parish's victims were retirees and small investors who lost their life savings. The case also led to changes in financial regulations and increased awareness about Ponzi schemes.
