= Robert Hadden =

American gynecologist and convicted sex offender

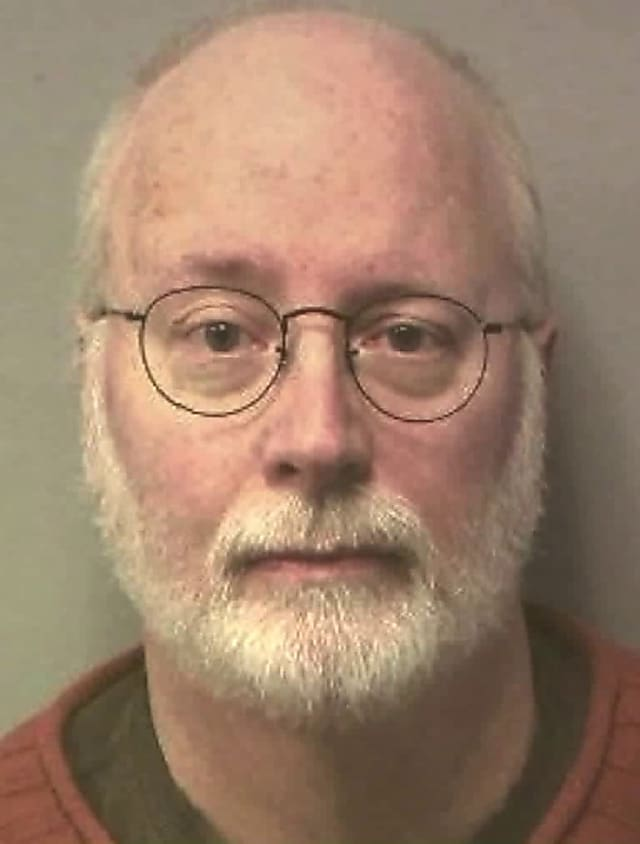
- Hadden's mug shot, September 2020
- Born: 1958 or 1959 (age 67–68)
- Education: Skidmore College, Barry University, New York Medical College
- Occupation: Gynecologist
- Years active: 1987–2012
- Employer: Columbia University
- Known for: Prolific sexual abuser

Robert Hadden is an American former gynecologist and convicted sex offender. Between the late 1980s and 2012, Dr. Hadden was found liable of sexually assaulting hundreds of women who were his patients at Columbia University Irving Medical Center and New York-Presbyterian Hospital. In 2012, accusations against Hadden began, and he was convicted of multiple sexual assault charges in 2016, but did not have to serve any jail time. The accusations continued to pile on, and Hadden was sentenced to twenty years in prison on July 25, 2023.

== Career ==
Hadden grew up in Garden City, a suburb in Long Island, and received a bachelor's degree from Skidmore College in 1980 and a master's degree from Barry University in 1983. He then went on to get an MD from New York Medical College in 1987. He began practicing as an obstetrician-gynecologist in 1991 and was an assistant professor of that subject until 2014. Hadden was employed by Columbia University and worked at Columbia University Irving Medical Center, New York-Presbyterian Hospital, and other clinics.

== Sexual assault allegations and plea deal ==
Hadden was believed to have begun sexually assaulting his patients in 1987, which continued for decades until 2012. He performed his sexual assaults under the guise of medical examinations, making his victims believe that their assaults were a part of standard medical procedure. His victims included pregnant women and underage girls.

Hadden was first accused of sexual assault in 2012, and was indicted in 2014 for sexual assault charges involving six women. Hadden hired defense lawyer Isabelle Kirshner, who was able to make a deal with the prosecution led by Cyrus Vance Jr. The U.S. Attorney's Office for the Southern District of New York accused the former gynecologist of "massaging, holding and groping victims' breasts for a prolonged period; groping both breasts at the same time; pinching, twisting, or otherwise manipulating a victim's nipples; extracting colostrum from a victim's breasts and tasting it; digitally penetrating and/or rubbing victims' vaginas in efforts to masturbate them; touching victims' clitorises; and licking victims' vaginas."

Originally, Hadden lost his license and had to register as a sex offender, but did not serve any time in prison. The attorney representing hundreds of complainant patients described Hadden's plea deal as more akin to “early paid retirement than the sentence for a convicted sexual predator”.

== New charges and conviction ==
In 2020, on live TV, Evelyn Yang, the wife of presidential candidate Andrew Yang, accused Hadden of sexually assaulting her when she was pregnant, which brought attention to the case and led to new federal charges against him. In July 2023, the United States District Court for the Southern District of New York sentenced Hadden to 20 years in prison for inducing four women to travel across state lines for unlawful sexual contact in his office.

The hospitals that Hadden has worked for have had to pay $236 million in damages to settle civil lawsuits by patients who had been subject to his abuse. At least 500 women have accused Hadden of sexual assault. The prosecution's lenient sentencing of Hadden was widely criticized, often being compared to the cases of Jeffrey Epstein and Harvey Weinstein, two other well-connected sex offenders who did not receive any jail time from Vance. In addition, the reaction from Columbia University has also been harshly criticized, as his superiors were aware of his first arrest and allowed him to continue practicing and sexually assaulting patients. His patients were not informed of his sexual assault allegations after he stopped practicing and victims were told to report their crimes to Columbia's general counsel instead of law enforcement. Columbia's reaction has been compared negatively with the sexual assault scandals at the University of Michigan and the University of Southern California, as those scandals prompted firings, resignations, and investigations within the university. Nobody associated with the scandal at Columbia has resigned or been fired. The Manhattan District Attorney has an ongoing investigation into Columbia's attempts to cover up Hadden's crimes, as does the New York Attorney General. Hadden's victims were instrumental in lobbying New York to enact the Adult Survivors Act, which was notably used in E. Jean Carroll v. Donald J. Trump.

== In media ==
In September 2023, ProPublica and New York Magazine published an investigation of Hadden's crimes, Columbia's complicity in them, and his victims' pursuit of legal action against him. At the same time, Wondery released a podcast entitled Exposed: Cover-Up at Columbia University, narrated by one of the reporters who worked on the ProPublica investigation. Columbia University subsequently released a statement apologizing to Hadden's victims. The ProPublica piece won an Edward R. Murrow award, and the podcast was nominated for multiple Ambies awards.
