= Big Springs, Texas =

Big Springs, Texas, United States
- unincorporated community
- Interactive map of Big Springs, Texas, United States
- Coordinates: 32°4′3″N 94°58′3″W
- Country: United States
- State: Texas
- County: Rusk
- Time zone: UTC-6 (CST)
  - Summer (DST): UTC-6 (CDT)

Big Springs, Texas, is an unincorporated community in the Rusk County, Texas, United States.
