= Mongols MC criminal allegations and incidents =

Criminal incidents involving the Mongols MC

Mongols MC
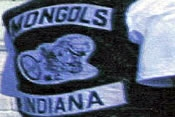
- Mongols colors
- Founded: December 5, 1969; 56 years ago
- Founding location: Montebello, California, United States
- Years active: 1969–present
- Territory: Chapters in 28 countries
- Membership: 4,000–5,000
- Activities: Drug trafficking, extortion, fraud, money laundering, intimidation, assault, murder
- Allies: Mexican Mafia; Nazi Lowriders; Norteños; Nuestra Familia; Sureños; Tijuana Cartel; Pagans MC
- Rivals: Bandidos MC; Finks MC; Hells Angels MC; Iron Order MC; Mongrel Mob; Outlaws MC; Vagos MC
- Notable members: Ruben Cavazos

The Mongols Motorcycle Club is considered a motorcycle gang by law enforcement and intelligence agencies in various countries internationally. Mongols members have a long history in the illegal drugs trade (especially methamphetamine), money laundering, robbery, extortion, firearms violations, murder, and assault, among other crimes. However, senior Mongols members as well as attorneys for the club deny that the group as a whole is a criminal enterprise and claim that the Mongols' bylaws prohibit criminals and drug users from being members.

== Australia ==
The Mongols expanded into Australia in 2013, establishing three chapters on the Central Coast of New South Wales. Peter "Chop" Emerton was the founder of the Mongols in Australia and first national president of the club in the country. In October 2013, a deal was brokered to "patch over" the Finks ahead of a proposed ban on the Finks under anti-gang legislation in Queensland. An estimated 90% of the Finks' members joined the Mongols. The Mongols' "patch over" of the Finks was the largest ever motorcycle club amalgamation in Australia, and made the club one of the most powerful bike gangs in the country, with a membership of around 400 and chapters in New South Wales, Queensland, Victoria, South Australia and Western Australia. The club is designated an outlaw motorcycle gang (OMCG) by the Australian Federal Police.

=== Queensland ===
Following the 12 October 2020 assassination of senior Finks bikie Shane Bowden in Pimpama, police visited all known Mongols members on the Gold Coast seeking information on Bowden's killing. Bowden had "patched over" to the Mongols from the Finks in 2013 but was expelled from the club in "bad standing" for bashing a fellow member and rejoined the Finks shortly before his death. The Mongols were reportedly concerned by Bowden's recruitment of new members into the Finks, and police theorised that he was killed over a dispute between the clubs.

A turf war between the Mongols and the Finks in South East Queensland subsequently broke out following Bowden's death, involving firebombings and bashings. On 5 June 2021, a barber shop in Windaroo was targeted in an arson attack. Mongols and Finks bikies were then involved in a brawl at the Australia Fair shopping centre in Southport on 7 June 2021. Police discovered documents suggesting that chapters of both clubs located between Logan and the Queensland border with New South Wales were acting on "attack on site" orders following the arrest of a Mongols national-level office bearer who was allegedly involved in the Australia Fair brawl.

== Germany ==
A German chapter of the Mongols MC was founded in Bremen by members of the local crime syndicate run by Lebanese immigrants in 2010. It was the first time that a Muslim clan-based crime syndicate in Germany became active in the field of outlaw motorcycle clubs.

Organized crime in Bremen is dominated by the Miri-Clan, a large family of Lebanese origin with more than 10,000 members, who first migrated to Germany beginning in the late 1970s, and rose to national notoriety with a number of large-scale criminal activities in 2010.

According to Andreas Weber, the state of Bremen's chief of criminal investigation, the new Mongols chapter is only nominally a motorcycle group. Clan members do not have motorcycle licences and drive around the city in cars. Presumably, they are interested in associating themselves with the U.S. motorcycle club primarily to profit from their infrastructure and trading channels in drug trafficking. The president of Mongols Bremen, "Mustafa B." accidentally killed himself with his bike as a novice licence holder briefly after the chapter's foundation. He was presumably succeeded by "Ibrahim M.", who is on record with 147 felonies ranging from grievous bodily harm to illegal possession of a weapon.

Local daily newspaper Kölnische Rundschau reports that a further German Mongols chapter has become active in Cologne, which is a traditional Hells Angels area.

Due to the negative publicity garnered by the Mongols in Germany, the club's European parent chapter expelled the German chapters in 2013. The German Mongols chapters refused to accept the expulsion, however, as they recognized the United States "mother chapter" as an authority.

In 2016, the last Mongols chapter in Bremen closed.

== Netherlands ==
On 11 October 2014, the Mongols announced the opening of a chapter in Amsterdam. The club's Dutch faction was sponsored for membership by the Mongols in Germany.

Members of the Mongols and the Hells Angels took part in a mass brawl in the bar of the Van der Valk Hotel in Rotterdam, during which several shots were fired, on the evening of 7 April 2016. The Royal Marechaussee and the Dienst Speciale Interventies attended the scene, and 23 bikers were arrested, some of whom were taken into custody at the hotel while others were apprehended in local parks. A knife and a firearm were seized. One motorcycle gang member suffered a gunshot wound to the leg, and police called it a "miracle" that no hotel staff or guests were injured in the fight. The following day, police seized guns, ammunition, drugs and counterfeit currency during searches of 19 locations, resulting in two men being charged with the prohibited possession of weapons. Another man was arrested on suspicion of attempted aggravated assault and public violence in relation to the melee, on 19 April 2016.

== New Zealand ==
The Mongols were established in New Zealand amidst a wave of motorcycle gang members being deported back to the country from Australia. The club has a membership of approximately 20 in New Zealand.

In January 2020, the Mongols were involved in a turf war with the Mongrel Mob in the Bay of Plenty, which involved semi-automatic weapons, tit-for-tat shootings and arson attacks.

== United States ==
The Mongols are one of the largest motorcycle gangs in the United States, with approximately 800 to 850 members and 70 chapters in 19 U.S. states. The club is primarily based on the West Coast and in the Southwest of the country, with the majority of its membership consisting of Hispanic men from the Los Angeles area. The Mongols involved in the transportation and distribution of cocaine, marijuana and methamphetamine, the interstate theft of stolen motorcycles, as well as violent crime including assault, intimidation and murder.

The club is allied with the Mexican Mafia–Sureño coalition, the Nuestra Familia–Norteño alliance, the Nazi Lowriders, and the Tijuana Cartel. Rival gangs include the Bandidos, the Hells Angels, the Iron Order, the Outlaws, and the Vagos.

=== Arizona ===
The Mongols have four chapters in Arizona.

The club founded a chapter in Tucson in May 1982, which led to a war with an existing chapter of the Dirty Dozen over control of prostitution rackets in the area. The Mongols aligned themselves with the Outlaws, who had established themselves in Tucson in September 1980 when Outlaws leader James "Big Jim" Nolan moved to the city after being paroled in Florida. The Dirty Dozen, in turn, formed an alliance with the Hells Angels. In November 1982, several Mongols were found in possession of weapons when stopped by police while they were serving as bodyguards for Nolan's wife.

=== California ===
The Mongols are listed as an outlaw motorcycle gang by the Attorney General of California. The club has 47 chapters and between 200 and 350 members in the state, with the highest concentration in Southern California and the San Francisco Bay Area. Of the approximately 47 motorcycle gangs active in California, the Mongols and Hells Angels are the two largest in membership size. The club is affiliated with the Mexican Mafia and Sureños in Southern California, and the Nuestra Familia and Norteños in Northern California, as well as the Nazi Lowriders. Supplied by the Tijuana Cartel, the Mongols are involved in the wholesale distribution of cocaine in the Los Angeles area.

==== Early incidents ====
Members of the Glendale Mongols chapter, along with bikers from the San Bernardino chapter of the Hells Angels, the Straight Satans of Venice, and the Glendale Night Riders, committed a sexual assault on a fifteen-year-old girl in August 1972. On April 5, 1973, Mongols member Ferman Benavides was among eleven motorcycle gang members convicted in Los Angeles of rape and sex perversion.

Ermelindo Garcia, a member of the Mongols' Visalia chapter, was fatally shot twice during a fight with a group of men outside a bowling alley in Delano on August 15, 1974. One senior Mongols member criticized the Delano police after no arrests were made in Garcia's killing, and said that the club had been warned against retaliation. 200 Mongols members formed a mile-long funeral procession as Garcia was buried in a Visalia cemetery on August 19, 1974.

==== War against the Hells Angels ====
On March 11, 1977, a large group of Mongols were involved in a mass brawl with nine Hells Angels members at a motorcycle swap meet at the Anaheim Convention Center, during which several Mongol bikers were seriously injured despite outnumbering the Angels. A number of Mongols were arrested by police afterwards, while the Hells Angels contingent was able to escape. The catalyst for the fight was a dispute between Chester "Bud" Green – a former member of the Richmond Hells Angels chapter who was expelled from the club after testifying against another member in a murder trial and who subsequently joined the Mongols – and a member of the Los Angeles Hells Angels whose ex-wife Green was living with at the time.

Shortly after the brawl in Anaheim, the Mongols began wearing a California "bottom rocker" – a patch displayed on a biker's "colors" denoting the club's territory. Prior to this, Mongol bikers had instead worn a patch indicating the city in which the chapter he belonged to was based. The purpose of the switch from city patches to a state patch was to prevent law enforcement from being able to identify which city Mongols members resided in. As the dominant club in the state, the Hells Angels claimed exclusive rights to the California "rocker" and took offense to the Mongols' wearing of the patch. When the Mongols defied the Hells Angels' warnings to cease wearing the California patch, the Angels voted unanimously at a club meeting on July 7, 1977 in favor of declaring war on their rivals. The ensuing biker war would result in the deaths of five people and injuries to several others over the following three months.

The Hells Angels began stockpiling explosives, purchasing "throw away" vehicles to be used in attacks, and forming teams of members to search for Mongols. On July 29, 1977, Mongols biker Allyn Bishop was shot and killed as he rode his motorcycle in Kern County. On September 5, 1977, a procession of Mongols members were ambushed by a three-man Hells Angels "hit team" in a drive-by shooting involving an AR-15 style rifle and a Soviet-made machine gun on Interstate 15 north of Escondido as they returned to San Diego from the club's annual Labor Day motorcycle run at the Kern River. The attack killed two members of the Mongols' San Diego chapter – president Emerson Richard "Redbeard" Morris and sergeant-at-arms Raymond "Jingles" Smith. Morris died at the scene, while Smith died at Palomar Medical Center in Escondido. The two bikers' spouses, who were riding on the back of their motorcycles, were wounded; Morris' wife Delores was left paralyzed. As the bodies of Morris and Smith were on display at the Conrad Mortuary in Lemon Grove on September 9, 1977, an unidentified member of the San Diego Hells Angels arrived in a white Rambler and delivered a bouquet of red and white carnations. After the Hells Angel left the scene in another vehicle, a car bomb concealed in the Rambler, which was parked in a parking lot adjacent to the mortuary, was detonated. The explosion wounded three people – Mongols members William "Big Red" Lowry and James "Skip" Canning, and the father of a biker – and destroyed a Cadillac limousine which belonged to the mortuary. On September 24, 1977, Los Angeles Hells Angels chapter "prospect" Thomas Heath delivered a flat motorcycle tire that had been rigged with an explosive device by another Angel, James "Brett" Eaton, to the Frame-Up, an auto repair shop owned by the Mongols in the Highland Park neighborhood of Los Angeles. The bomb exploded when the tire valve was unscrewed, killing Mongols member Henry Jimenez and Raymond Hernandez, the fifteen-year-old brother of another biker. On September 29, 1977, a police informant in the San Diego Hells Angels was given a bomb made from nine sticks of dynamite by chapter president Thomas James "Crunch" Renzulli and instructed to place the device on the car of a Mongols member who had attempted to run down a Hells Angels biker. Instead, the informant turned the explosives over to the authorities. On October 11, 1977, six sticks of dynamite were discovered by a mechanic attached to the vehicle of a member of the San Diego Mongols after he took his car to a repair shop. The bomb was believed to have been placed on October 1, 1977. The Bureau of Alcohol, Tobacco, Firearms and Explosives (ATF) matched the bomb's components to the device earlier given to the informant by Renzulli.

During the 1980s, the Mongols seized control of Southern California from the Hells Angels. On January 17, 1982, five Mongols attacked San Diego Hells Angels chapter sergeant-at-arms Raymond "Fat Ray" Piltz at the Horseshoe Tavern, a San Diego County bar, striking Piltz with a table before fatally shooting him. The five Mongols members involved in the attack were subsequently indicted on murder charges. One of the bikers, Donald Wayne Sullings, became a fugitive before he was apprehended in Newton, Mississippi on May 15, 1982. Mongols member Scott "Junior" Ereckson was ultimately convicted of involuntary manslaughter in Piltz's death and served four in prison.

Seeking an end to hostilities, the Mongols and the Hells Angels signed a peace agreement. Under the terms of the truce, the Mongols were granted free rein over Southern California and given permission to wear the California "bottom rocker", although the Angels were allowed to retain their Southern California chapters, located in Monterey, Orange County, Riverside, Fresno, Ventura, San Diego and San Bernardino. The Mongols, in turn, were forbidden from expanding into Northern California, which was allocated exclusively to the Hells Angels. The feud between the clubs in Southern California was reactivated, however, by a fight at the first annual Easyriders trade show, held in the parking lot of the RMS Queen Mary in Long Beach on February 11, 1989. Between 50 and 100 members of the Mongols and the Hells Angels were among approximately 3,000 motorcycle enthusiasts attending the event when an argument led to a mass brawl between the rival bikers, which resulted in San Bernardino Hells Angels chapter sergeant-at-arms Aristeo Andres "Art" Carbajal being fatally stabbed in the chest. Several others also suffered non-fatal stab wounds. Riot police from the Long Beach Police Department (LBPD) were required at the scene to end the violence. Carbajal's killing went unsolved, although it was allegedly carried out by an associate of the Mongols. The second iteration of the Easyriders trade show was scheduled to be held at the Los Angeles Convention Center between February 23 and 25, 1990 but was relocated to Malibu due to a Los Angeles Police Department (LAPD) intelligence report, which warned that a biker convention at the facility presented a "clear and present danger" to the public.

By 2002, the Mongols had begun establishing a presence in Northern California, in defiance of the peace treaty with the Hells Angels, under which the northern part of the state was deemed the Angels' territory. The Mongols' expansion north caused further tension between the clubs. On April 27, 2002, between 60 and 70 members of the Mongols and the Hells Angels took part in a brawl and shoot-out on the casino floor at Harrah's Laughlin during the 20th annual Laughlin River Run in Laughlin, Nevada, leaving three bikers dead. Those killed were Hells Angels members Jeramie Dean Bell and Robert Emmet Tumelty, who died from gunshot wounds, and Anthony Salvador Barrera, a Mongol from East Los Angeles who was stabbed to death. On the same night, another Hells Angel, Christian Harvey Tate, was fatally shot in the back while riding his motorcycle on Interstate 40 near Ludlow as he traveled home to Southern California from the River Run. Tate's killing remains a cold case, although investigators surmised that his shooting was connected to the Laughlin incident.

Christopher Bryan "Stoney" Ablett, a member of the Mongols' Modesto chapter, stabbed and shot San Francisco Hells Angels chapter president Mark "Papa" Guardado to death following a struggle outside a bar in the Mission District of San Francisco on September 3, 2008. Ablett had traveled to San Francisco to visit a friend, armed with a foot-long military knife and a .357 magnum revolver, and wearing a Mongols "full-patch" vest and T-shirt. Upon learning that Ablett was wearing Mongols "colors" in the bar, Guardado confronted the rival biker outside. Ablett fled the scene on a motorcycle after the killing, which took place less than a mile from the Hells Angels' clubhouse in the Dogpatch neighborhood. On September 18, 2008, three pipe bombs exploded in the driveway of the San Jose home of Robert Rios, the president of the Mongols' Santa Clara chapter. The ATF described the bombing, which caused no injuries but damaged two cars, as a possible act of retaliation by the Angels for the death of Guardado. After going on the run for Guardado's murder, Ablett turned himself in to authorities in Bartlesville, Oklahoma, on October 4, 2008. His bond was set at $5 million. He was convicted of murder in aid of racketeering and three gun charges on February 23, 2012, in San Francisco. On May 15, 2012, Ablett was sentenced to serve two concurrent life sentences and one life sentence to run consecutively.

On November 8, 2008, Hells Angels member Robert Daniel Thompson was shot several times and wounded by Mongols biker Eric Gunner "The Mayor" Lundin outside The Shanty bar in Eureka. Lundin was arrested later that night, along with Dustin Christopher Liebes, Brad Lee Miller and Eric Dean Garcia, after authorities located a dark-colored van which was reportedly seen by witnesses at the scene of the shooting. A disassembled semi-automatic hand gun was discovered in the van upon a search by investigators. Lundin, Liebes and Garcia were "patch-wearing" Mongols members, while Miller was an alleged club "prospect" at the time. Lundin pleaded no contest to assault with a firearm and participating in a criminal street gang, Liebes and Garcia both pleaded no contest to participation in a criminal street gang, and Miller pleaded no contest to being an accessory after the fact. On January 20, 2009, Lundin was sentenced to three years' imprisonment, Liebes and Garcia to one year, and Miller to 180 days in jail.

Mongols "prospect" Jose Luis Sanchez injured three people when he fired eight to ten rounds from a semi-automatic pistol into a crowd of people who were leaving The Echo nightclub on Sunset Boulevard in the Echo Park neighborhood of Los Angeles in an attempt to shoot a Hells Angels biker who was at the venue, on June 21, 2010. None of those wounded were affiliated with any motorcycle gang. Sanchez was arrested by the LAPD Hollebeck Division on July 14, 2010, after police obtained a search and arrest warrant. He pleaded no contest to two counts of attempted willful, premeditated and deliberate murder and one count of assault with a firearm, with each of the offenses committed for the benefit of, at the direction of or in association with a criminal street gang. Sanchez was sentenced to 38 years in state prison.

Two Hells Angels members suffered stab wounds during a brawl involving dozens of Mongols and Hells Angels bikers armed with weapons, including shovels, bats, hammers and screwdrivers, on Interstate 15 near Temecula, on March 22, 2014. The fight between the clubs is believed to have begun further south on the freeway in San Diego County, when two Mongols were being pursued on motorcycle by a larger group of Hells Angels, before more Mongols members arrived and ambushed the Angels near Temecula. No arrests were made in the incident as the victims refused to cooperate with investigators. In another incident on Interstate 15, on September 20, 2014, Mongols and Hells Angels exchanged gunfire near Corona. Mongols associate Frankie Varela was shot dead, while another man was wounded by gunfire. A third man suffered undisclosed injuries.

Mongols member Joshua Ryan Herbert opened fire with a revolver on a group of five Hells Angels bikers as they refuelled their motorcycles at a Shell gas station in Riverside, on May 21, 2017, killing one Hells Angel, James Duty, and wounding another. The incident followed a series of shootings and attempted murders between the clubs in Orange County and Los Angeles County over the previous eight months. Herbert was charged with murder and firearm offenses, on June 21, 2017, after a month-long investigation by the Riverside Police Department, the Federal Bureau of Investigation (FBI), the ATF and the California Department of Justice. He was convicted of first-degree murder and attempted murder. Additionally, a jury found Herbert guilty of committing the offenses as an active participate in a criminal street gang.

On May 5, 2018, members of the Hells Angels were attending a motorcycle wash fundraiser outside Zingos Café in Bakersfield when Mongols bikers arrived, prompting a confrontation between the rival clubs. Mongols associate Ricardo Viera fired an illegal pump-action pistol grip shotgun into a crowd of people, causing minor wounds to one person. Viera was then killed when he was shot several times by the owner of a legally-owned handgun. Viera's killer cooperated with the Bakersfield Police Department and was not arrested as the shooting was deemed self-defense. Three Mongols – Christopher Clay Wilson, Eliseo Ray Miranda and Arturo Desiderio – were subsequently arrested and charged with conspiracy, gang participation, attempted murder and assault. Wilson pleaded no contest to an accessory charge in August 2018 and was sentenced to time served and three years' probation on January 18, 2019.

==== Infighting ====
Mongols member Richard Glen Mathews was convicted of first-degree murder for a shooting in San Bernardino in 1977. Shortly after being paroled from prison, Mathews shot and wounded another biker in a dispute over drug money, leading to his expulsion from the club. In retaliation for his having his membership revoked, Matthews, along with Michael Lee "Mike" Webb, built a pipe bomb and planted it outside the residence of James "Fat Man" Rivera, the president of the Mongols' San Diego chapter, at 120 Ebony Street in Imperial Beach, on May 15, 1991. The following morning, another man, James "Three-Wheel Jim" Wilson, was critically injured by the device while collecting aluminum cans in the alley behind Rivera's home. Wilson, who was unaffiliated with the Mongols, suffered a broken forearm and leg, lost his nose and a pinky finger, and was blinded and deafened in the explosion. He died seven months later of an undisclosed illness that was "accelerated by the trauma he had undergone". Mathews, Webb and an alleged female accomplice, Sybille Maria Tompkins, were arrested as suspects in the bombing following an investigation by the ATF and the San Diego County Sheriff's Department, and on July 18, 1991, Mathews and Webb were charged in a 10-count federal indictment. A a sawed-off shotgun, two pistols and ammunition were recovered by federal agents during the arrests of Mathews and Webb, despite both men being prohibited from possessing firearms as convicted felons.

In 1993, a federal jury convicted Mathews of six felony counts, including conspiracy, bombing of property, and aiding and abetting. He was initially sentenced to serve 45 years and 8 months in prison, but this sentence was reduced to 41 years upon appeal, on October 14, 1997. After another appeal regarding a clause in the Armed Career Criminal Act, Mathews' sentence was vacated by the U.S. Court of Appeals for the Ninth Circuit in 2022. On February 3, 2023, Roger Benitez, federal judge for the U.S. District Court for the Southern District of California, resentenced him to the time he had already served in prison — approximately 31 years — and ordered his release.

==== Operation Ivan ====
Beginning in March 1998, ATF agent William Queen infiltrated the San Fernando Valley chapter of the Mongols as part of the ATF's Operation Ivan, eventually becoming a "full-patch" member and rising to the rank of chapter secretary/treasurer, using the undercover alias of Billy St. John. ATF gang expert John Ciccone acted as Queen's handler during the investigation. On November 25, 1999, a group of Mongols led by Adrian "Panhead" Gutierrez fatally beat and stabbed a man, Daniel Herrera, who had verbally disparaged the bikers, outside Gina's Bar in Commerce. Gutierrez was subsequently awarded with a skull and crossbones patch, which is allegedly worn only by a Mongol who has killed on behalf of the club. In tape recorded conversations with Gutierrez, on December 21, 1999 and January 6, 2000, Queen attempted to coax Gutierrez into confessing to Herrera's murder, but the biker refused to implicate himself, saying instead that he "never did nothing" and that he was "with [his] old lady that night".

Based on evidence gathered during Queen's 28-month tenure working undercover in the club, the investigation culminated on May 19, 2000, when 54 Mongols members were arrested as search warrants were served in Wilmington, Temple City, Monterey Park, Rosemead, Alhambra, La Puente, Porterville, Frazier Park and San Diego. While most of those arrested were charged with narcotics or firearms violations, three bikers – Adrian Gutierrez, David Herrera and David Rivera – were charged with murder. In addition to the raids in Southern California, search warrants were also executed at Mongols clubhouses in Georgia and Oklahoma. Approximately 300 ATF agents and 375 Los Angeles County Sheriff's Department (LASD) deputies were involved in the operation. Over 70 illegal firearms, 17 stolen motorcycles, two kilograms of cocaine, and $27,000 in cash were seized during the raids.

All but one of the accused were later convicted of crimes, including drug trafficking, motorcycle theft, and conspiracy to commit murder. Jeremy McDonald, a member of the San Fernando Valley chapter, pleaded guilty to buying and selling stolen motorcycle parts, altering VINs, and two counts of interstate transportation of stolen motorcycles, and cooperated in the investigation in exchange for leniency. He testified under a grant of use immunity that he gave Adrian Gutierrez a buck knife shortly before the altercation which resulted in the death of Daniel Herrera, and that he witnessed Gutierrez and other Mongols attack Herrera, who died from a stab wound to the torso and blunt force trauma. On December 19, 2000, Gutierrez was convicted of second-degree murder in Herrera's killing. He was also acquitted of using a dangerous or deadly weapon for the benefit of a criminal street gang. Gutierrez was sentenced to 18 years-to-life in prison.

==== War against the Mexican Mafia ====
Prior to the presidency of Ruben "Doc" Cavazos, the Mongols were allied with the Mexican Mafia, on the street and in prison. In order to bolster their membership, the Mongols began recruiting members from Sureño street gangs, including the Avenues and 18th Street, during the 1990s. Although many of these newly recruited members did not own a motorcycle, which is in breach of the Mongols' bylaws, the club relaxed their standards in order to match the rival Hells Angels in numbers. Some East Los Angeles gang veterans joined the Mongols' enforcer squad and began wearing an "ELA Enforcer" patch. In January 2004, a group of Mongols took part in a narcotics transaction with members of the Bassett Grande street gang at a motel room in Arcadia, purchasing a wholesale quantity of methamphetamine to sell on the retail market. Afterwards, the bikers were invited by the Bassett Grande gang to attend a party in the same motel room. One of the Mongols, a former member of the 18th Street gang, was recognized as a former Sureño who had been marked for death and placed on the Mexican Mafia's "green light" list, which is circulated throughout county jails and state prisons in Southern California, for a breaking the Sureño code of conduct. He was killed and another Mongol was seriously wounded in a melee, while two other bikers ran from the scene. The two Mongols who fled were subsequently punished by the club for cowardice. On January 10, 2004, a Mongols member from San Jose, a Norteño area, was shot and killed after a confrontation with members of the Sangra Sureño gang in the parking lot of a motel in Rosemead. In the aftermath of the shooting, a suspect was detained by Los Angeles County Sheriff's Department (LASD) deputies, who also seized drugs and equipment from a methamphetamine lab being operated by the Sangra gang in a room at the motel. Due to the Mongols' increasing presence in the drug market, the Mexican Mafia requested payment from the club. In March 2004, Mexican Mafia "shot callers" sent out the message that the Sureños had sustained over $20,000 in loss of drug revenue and personal damages and ordered the Mongols to pay for the lost revenue, threatening to put the club's members on the "green light" list, making them a target for murder by the Sureños in and out of custody. The following month, the Mongols responded that they would refuse to pay extortion money to La Eme, causing a war which resulted in casualties on each side. The conflict between the Mongols and the Mexican Mafia was ultimately resolved, and the gangs continue to cooperate in drug trafficking.

==== Violent incidents ====
On March 16, 2002, a group of between 70 and 100 Mongol bikers attended the "Ultimate Athlete 2: The Gathering" mixed martial arts event at the Morongo Casino, Resort & Spa in Cabazon, where Mongols member Rick "Bad Boy" Slaton was fighting Leonid "The Russian Assassin" Pavlushkin. When Pavlushkin complained of suffering an illegal low blow from Slaton, Mongols members in the arena began throwing beer cans into the ring. A mass brawl then broke out ringside after other members of the audience began throwing refuse back at the bikers, resulting in at least one person being stabbed. The melee was eventually quelled when San Bernardino County Sheriff's Department deputies clad in riot gear, some armed with M16 rifles, stormed the arena.

In February 2007, Mongols members assaulted several nightclub patrons in a nightclub parking lot in downtown San Jose. A man was stabbed in the arm after he confronted a Mongol over a bicycle that had been kicked over, and other clubgoers who attempted to assist the victim were punched, kicked, and spat on.

==== Operation Black Rain ====
Operation Black Rain was an operation by the ATF in 2008 to stop alleged criminal activity within the Mongols. On October 21, 2008, 38 members, including Ruben "Doc" Cavazos, were taken into Federal custody after four ATF agents infiltrated the group for a second time, becoming full patch members. 110 arrest warrants and 160 search warrants were issued in California, Ohio, Colorado, Nevada, Washington, and Oregon. On October 23, 2008, US District Court Judge Florence-Marie Cooper granted an injunction that prohibits club members, their family members and associates from wearing, licensing, selling, or distributing the logo, which typically depicts the profile of a Mongolian warrior wearing sunglasses, because according to the police, they use the logo and names as an identity and as a form of intimidation to fulfill their goals. Prosecutors requested the injunction after authorities arrested dozens of Mongols under a racketeering indictment. The club president Ruben Cavazos and others pleaded guilty to the racketeering charge, and Cavazos was sentenced to serve 14 years in the penitentiary. Cavazos was voted out of the club by its members on August 30, 2008.

==== Lancaster event ====
In July 2009, a planned weekend meeting in Lancaster, California, expected to draw 800 Mongols and their families, was blocked after city officials shut down and fenced off the hotel they had booked for the event, which coincided with the "Celebrate Downtown Lancaster" festival. The mayor had previously threatened to shut down the hotel over unpaid taxes if the agreement to host the Mongols was not canceled. An attorney for the Mongols said he planned to sue the city and the mayor, potentially for civil rights violations, after previously threatening to sue the hotel for breach of contract should they comply with the mayor's demands. Mayor R. Rex Parris said he wants to keep the Mongols out because they "are engaged in domestic terrorism...and they kill our children." The television show America's Most Wanted had exclusive access to the operation, and broadcast behind-the-scenes footage of the many arrests.

==== Child rape ====
In 2010, Mongols leader Michael Reyes was arrested in Hollister, California for raping a minor over a 10-year period.

==== Killing of Officer Shaun Diamond ====
On October 28, 2014, in San Gabriel, California, Mongols member David Martinez allegedly shot and killed Pomona Police SWAT Team member Shaun Diamond. Diamond was shot in the back of the base of his neck with a shotgun during the service of a search warrant. Martinez shot Diamond after the officer turned away from the doorway following the breaching procedure. Officer Diamond died the following morning, October 29, 2014, at Huntington Memorial Hospital. Judge M. L. Villar, at the preliminary hearing, added a special gang allegation to the capital murder charges after the prosecution connected him to a Mongols chapter in Montebello, California. A mistrial was declared at Martinez' initial trial which began in 2019. While Martinez was found not guilty of first-degree murder, the mistrial occurred due to a hung jury for all other charges. Martinez faces the death penalty if convicted in a future trial for the killing of Officer Diamond.

=== Colorado ===
Four Mongols chapters have been founded in Colorado.

=== Florida ===
The Mongols have several chapters in Florida, including in the Tampa Bay area.

=== Nevada ===
The Mongols have established 5 chapters in Nevada.

Tensions between the Mongols and the Hells Angels increased as the Mongols expanded into the Angels' home territory of Northern California. In 2002, members of the Mongols and the Hells Angels had a confrontation at the Harrah's Laughlin Casino in Laughlin, Nevada, that left three bikers dead. Mongol Anthony "Bronson" Barrera, 43, was stabbed to death and two Hells Angels – Jeramie Bell, 27, and Robert Tumelty, 50 – were shot to death. On February 23, 2007, Hells Angels members James Hannigan and Rodney Cox were sentenced to two years in prison for their respective roles in the incident. Cox and Hannigan were captured on videotape confronting Mongols inside the casino.

On December 20, 2008, a group of Mongols arrived at a Las Vegas chapel for the wedding of a fellow member, only to find a local chapter of Hells Angels there finishing a ceremony of their own. According to local news outlet KTNV Channel 13, the Hells Angels attacked the Mongols members, sending three to the hospital, two of whom suffered from stab wounds. No arrests were made, and local authorities report that they are looking for suspects involved in the attack.

=== Oklahoma ===
Oklahoma is home to five Mongols chapters. The club is involved in the retail-level distribution of methamphetamine and Mexican-produced marijuana in the Oklahoma City and Tulsa areas.

On May 19, 2000, raids were carried out on Mongols clubhouses in Oklahoma, California and Georgia following a two-and-a-half year undercover investigation of the club by Bureau of Alcohol, Tobacco, Firearms and Explosives (ATF) agent William Queen. One Mongols member, Richard Deeter Sr., was arrested by Tulsa police in Owasso on charges of possession of methamphetamine, possession of a firearm in the commission of a felony, and possession of marijuana. The three-state operation involved approximately 300 ATF agents, and led to the arrests of more than 30 Mongols nationally, and the seizure of over 70 illegal firearms, 17 stolen motorcycles, two kilograms of cocaine, and $27,000 in cash. According to ATF resident agent in charge in Oklahoma Jeff Cochran, evidence was found at the Mongols' Oklahoma clubhouse that could link the club to "the conspiracy of an overall criminal enterprise".

=== Oregon ===
The Mongols established chapters in Oregon in 2007 and 2008, "astonishing" authorities, who described it as a breach of motorcycle club code of conduct, and who expected a turf war with rival motorcycle clubs to result. The club has six chapters in the state.

=== Texas ===
The Mongols claim 11 chapters in Texas.

== See also ==
- Bandidos MC criminal allegations and incidents
- Hells Angels MC criminal allegations and incidents
- Outlaws MC criminal allegations and incidents
