= Hells Angels MC criminal allegations and incidents in California =

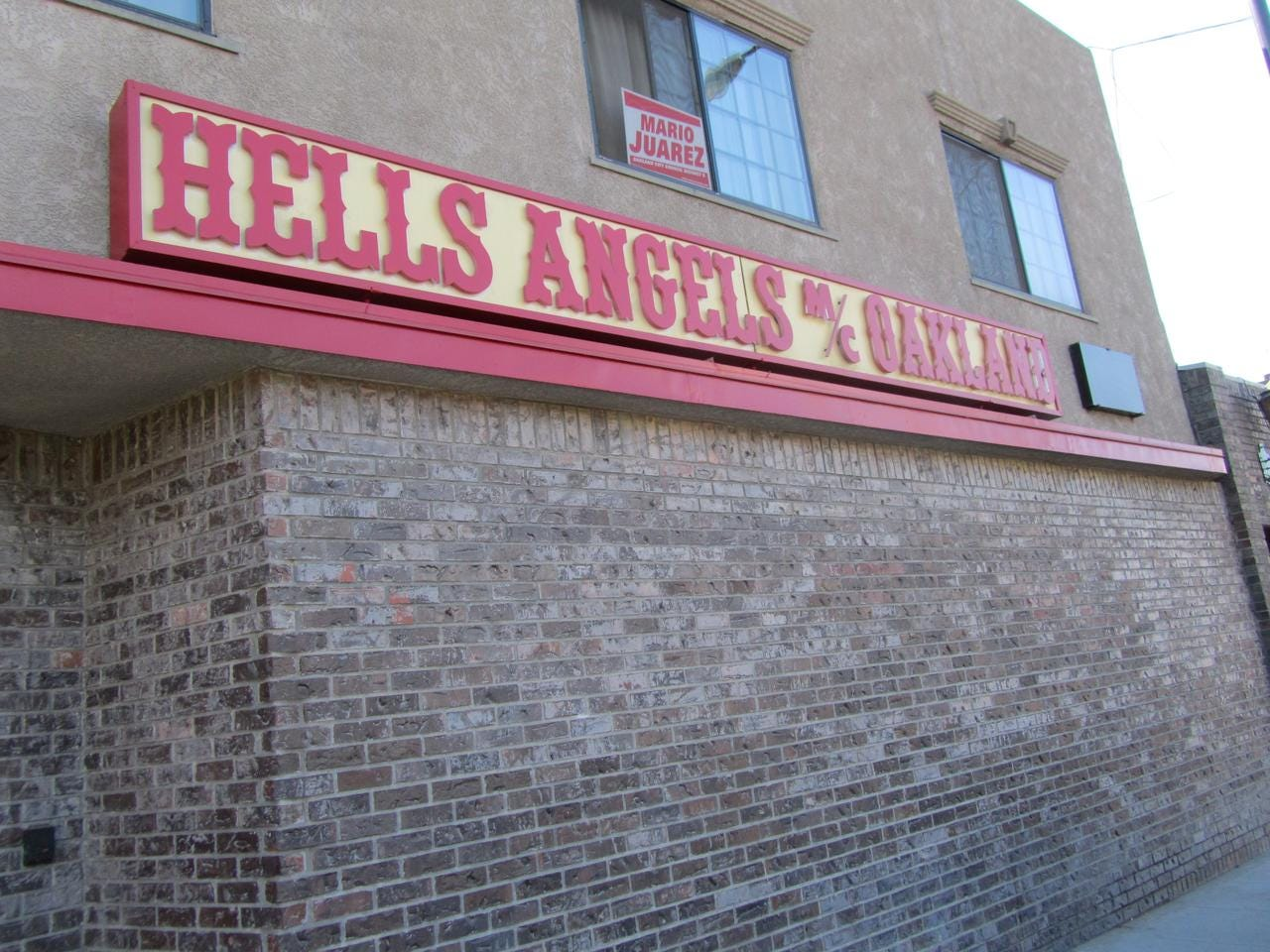
Hells Angels clubhouse in Oakland

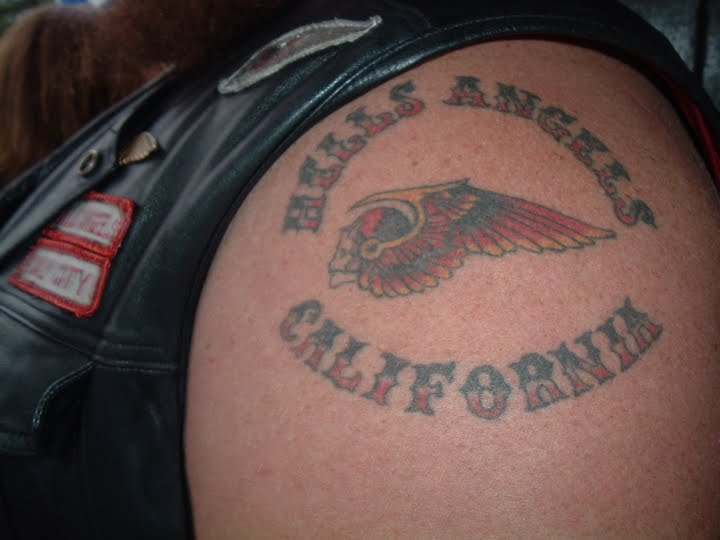
Hells Angels California tattoo

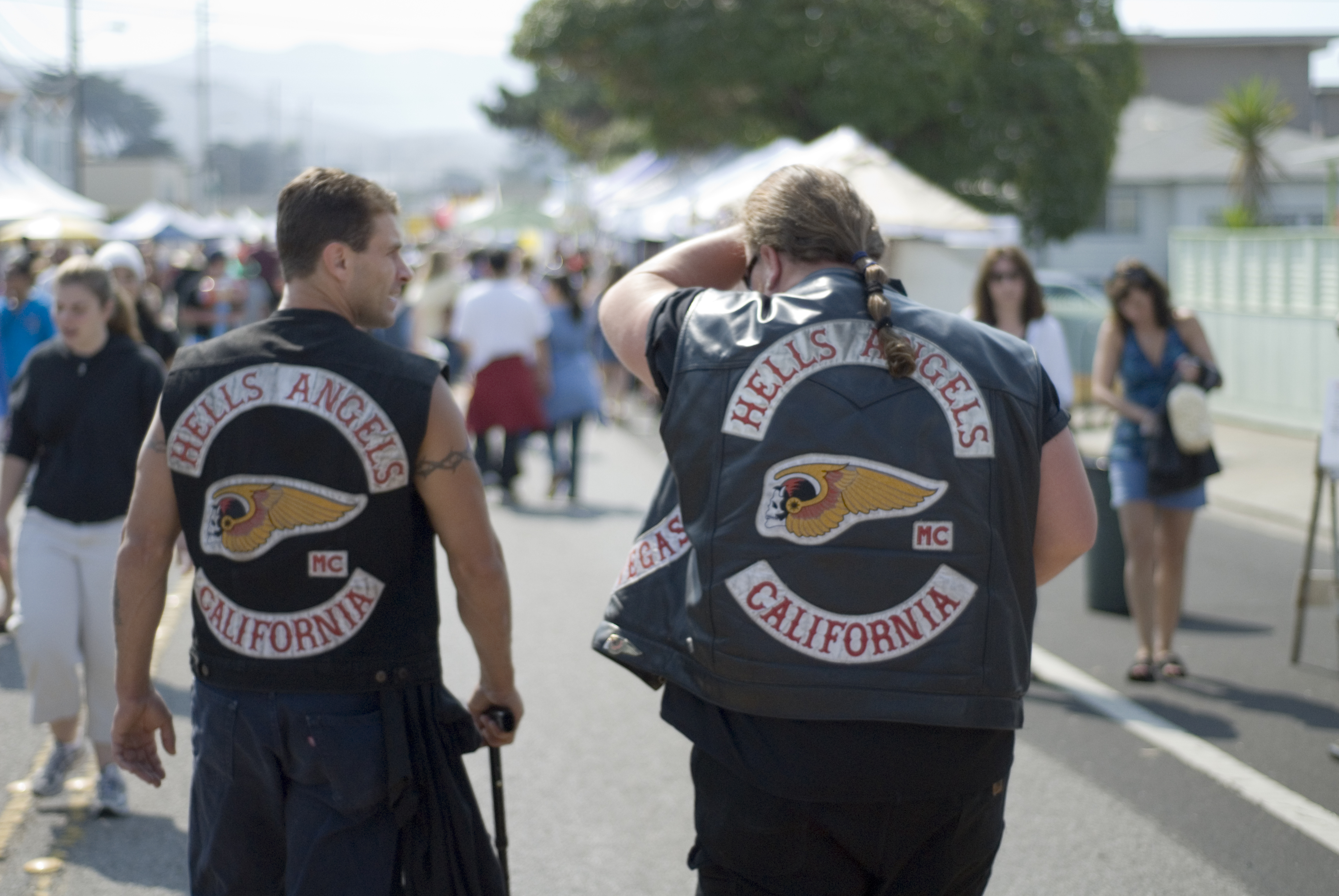
Hells Angels members

Numerous police and international intelligence agencies classify the Hells Angels Motorcycle Club as a motorcycle gang and contend that members carry out widespread violent crimes, including drug dealing, trafficking in stolen goods, gunrunning, extortion, and prostitution rings. Members of the organization have continuously asserted that they are only a group of motorcycle enthusiasts who have joined to ride motorcycles together, to organize social events such as group road trips, fundraisers, parties, and motorcycle rallies, and that any crimes are the responsibility of the individuals who carried them out and not the club as a whole.

There are more Hells Angels chapters in California than in any other U.S. state. With over 300 members statewide, the Hells Angels are the most significant motorcycle gang in California in terms of membership and criminal activity. The club has a significant role in the manufacture and distribution of methamphetamine, and in other illegal enterprises. The West Coast faction of the HAMC has also been especially active in the infiltration of legitimate businesses, including motorcycle and automobile services, catering operations, bars, restaurants, and antique stores. The San Fernando Valley chapter has colluded with the Los Angeles crime family and Five Families of New York in debt collection and the theft of electronics, and the San Jose charter has been linked with the San Jose crime family. Additionally, the California Hells Angels have associated in criminal ventures with the Aryan Brotherhood, the Mexican Mafia, and the Nazi Lowriders. A 1990 review by the California Department of Justice determined that the 215 members of fourteen Hells Angels chapters in the state had been arrested an average of 10.4 times each, in a total of 2,202 charges – most commonly, narcotics violations, assault, weapons violations, burglary and robbery. The offenders' crimes generally escalated after they gained membership of the club.

== Early incidents ==
Shortly after the foundation of the Hells Angels' North Sacramento chapter in 1956, twelve club members were arrested at a house party in Sacramento's Ben Ali neighborhood. After being elected sheriff of Sacramento County in January 1961, John Misterly began a campaign of surveillance and purported harassment against the Hells Angels. In 1964, one Hells Angel, Ernest Cannada, appeared before the Sacramento City Council and read a letter protesting alleged illegal tactics against the club by sheriff's deputies. During this period, Hells Angels members would reportedly remove their "colors" before entering Sacramento County due to Misterly's hostility towards the club. In the spring of 1965, James "Mother" Miles, the founding president of the Sacramento Hells Angels, disbanded the chapter and relocated it to Richmond, where its members joined forces with Hells Angels from the San Francisco Bay Area to form a Nomads chapter. Misterly took credit for ousting the Angels from the county and denied that his deputies were guilty of harassing the bikers. Misterly's supporters told The Sacramento Bee that his "harassment techniques" were "instrumental in the breakup of the Hells Angels", however. Misterly allowed the Hells Angels to return to Sacramento as part of a one-day truce to attend the funeral of Miles, who was killed in a motorcycle accident in Berkeley on January 9, 1966. Up to 300 Hells Angels from eleven club chapters throughout California were present at Miles' funeral before they were given a police escort out of the city. The Sacramento chapter was re-established in 1973.

A group of Hells Angels armed with can-openers fought with United States First Fleet sailors on shore leave from the USS Bon Homme Richard, at a San Pablo drive-in theater on June 15, 1957. Police arrested seven people—four Hells Angels and three sailors. Two of the Hells Angels—Donald L. Reeves and Curis A. Hammond—were charged with disturbing the peace after trying to run down a San Pablo police sergeant while escaping the scene in a car. The pair were later arrested by Albany police. Additionally, James R. Jenkins, who was found in possession of a 15-inch length of chain, was charged with assault with a deadly weapon, and Norman C. Phillips, a California Youth Authority parolee, was charged with parole violation.

On January 29, 1963, the Hells Angels' Oakland headquarters was raided by police, and seven club members were charged with the alleged gang rape of a 29-year-old woman, which took place on January 27. Other charges included Hitlerism, marijuana possession and theft. A swastika flag and a picture of Adolf Hitler, with the inscription "Hitler is alive, our buddy", were also found on the premises.

Five people were charged with inciting a riot and one with the illegal possession of a weapon after the Tulare County Sheriff's Department, the California Highway Patrol and local police dispersed approximately 200 members of seven motorcycle clubs from across California, including the Hells Angels and the Galloping Goose, who converged in Porterville on August 31 and September 1, 1963. Among numerous incidents of violence, a group of bikers allegedly stormed Sierra View District Hospital in an attempt to continue a fight with G.E. Montgomery, a resident of the city who was receiving medical treatment after earlier being beaten at a local tavern.

48 Hells Angels members and their girlfriends were arrested at their clubhouse on San Francisco's Folsom Street on December 5, 1964, on charges of robbery, assault with a deadly weapon, possession of marijuana, contributing to the delinquency of a minor (three of the girls were alleged to be underage), aiding suspected felons, and the alleged rape of a twenty-five-year-old woman, who claimed she was assaulted on the premises the day before. The raid also pertained to a robbery in a nearby alley of a man who was allegedly knocked unconscious and dispossessed of his wallet.

A group of Hells Angels members, as well as some of their girlfriends, were charged in connection with a fight which broke out during a birthday celebration at a cafe in San Francisco in September 1965. The violence allegedly erupted when the bikers attacked two police officers who arrived at the establishment.

Sixteen Hells Angels members attacked anti-Vietnam War demonstrators at a Vietnam Day Committee protest march in Berkeley on October 16, 1965, resulting in six Hells Angels being arrested and one police officer suffering a broken leg. The incident led to a collection of students, left-wing political groups and labor unions led by Allen Ginsberg and Jerry Rubin meeting with a group of motorcycle club representatives, headed by the president of the Sacramento HAMC chapter, in the cafeteria at San Jose State College, seeking assurance that a planned protest march in Oakland on November 20 would go undisturbed. On November 19, five Hells Angels members led by the club's reputed national leader Sonny Barger held a press conference at their bail bondsman's office, announcing that the club would not attend the protest the following day as "Any physical encounter would only produce sympathy for this mob of traitors", according to Barger. He went on to read out a telegram sent to President Lyndon B. Johnson, reading "I volunteer a group of loyal Americans for behind the line duty in Vietnam. We feel that a crack group of trained guerillas could demoralize the Viet Cong and advance the cause of freedom." President Johnson did not reply to the letter.

Eight Hells Angels were arrested when a fight broke out in a Daly City tavern on April 15, 1966, following the funeral of San Francisco HAMC chapter member Larry Dean Lucas, who died in a motorcycle accident near Santa Maria on April 9.

For at least five years beginning in 1967, the Oakland chapter of the Hells Angels turned over weapons acquired on the black market or locations of weapons, which could otherwise be used by Black Panther Party and Weather Underground radicals, to the Oakland Police Department (OPD) in exchange for the release of jailed Hells Angels members. OPD sergeant Edward "Ted" Hilliard testified in 1972 that he accepted guns, dynamite and grenades from the club's president Sonny Barger in return for deals on arrests during at least fifteen separate meetings, the most recent of which took place in the spring of 1971. Hilliard also testified that Barger had offered "to deliver the bagged body of a leftist for every Angel released from jail". He denied, however, that authorities permitted crimes committed by the Hells Angels.

Hells Angels member Charles "Crazy Chuck" Forsyth was arrested in possession of marijuana on February 16, 1967, and the San Bernardino County Sheriff's Department was subsequently granted a warrant by the Ontario Municipal Court Judge Richard C. Garner to search the Gray Ranch in Alta Loma, which served as the headquarters of the club's San Bernardino chapter, as deputies had probable cause to suspect the ranch contained more marijuana. The Gray Ranch was rented by the Hells Angels from landlord W.H. LaBand of West Covina. On February 18, 1967, thirteen Hells Angels members, including "Berdoo" chapter president Otto Friedli, and eight women were arrested on drug and weapons possession charges when 27 officers of the Sheriff's Department vice squad and special enforcement unit, and the California Highway Patrol raided the ranch. Four boys aged three to six, who were the children of Hells Angels members, were sent to juvenile hall. The arrests were largely uneventful, although one Hells Angel, David Friedli, had to be restrained when he attacked a photographer from The Sun-Telegram. Quantities of marijuana and other drugs; an arsenal of 21 firearms, including semi-automatic rifles and pistols, and ammunition; several switchblade knives, Nazi insignia; motorcycles and motorcycle parts were seized in the raid. On March 20, 1967, four of the accused were released due to lack of evidence. Dennis L. Thomas and David Lee Baumgardner pleaded guilty to possession of marijuana on November 27, 1967. Due to the publicity the raid received, four senior members of the San Bernardino chapter were granted a change of venue to stand trial, with their cases moving to Santa Ana in Orange County. Friedli was convicted of maintaining a place for the unlawful use of marijuana, and unlawful possession of a firearm by a former felon. On February 29, 1968, two other Hells Angels, Theodore Moses Medina and Ralph D. Ladd, were found guilty of marijuana possession. The Hells Angels subsequently abandoned the Gray Ranch.

== Sex crimes ==
Approximately 300 Hells Angels descended on Monterey during Labor Day Weekend 1964 for the purpose of raising funds among themselves to transport the body of a former member, who was killed in an accident, back to his mother in North Carolina. On September 6, 1964, two girls, aged fourteen and fifteen, were allegedly taken from their dates and gang raped by Hells Angels members. Four Hells Angels were jailed for rape, although the charges were dismissed on September 25 due to insufficient evidence. The club was also banned from the city. The incident prompted an investigation into the Hells Angels and other motorcycle gangs by the Attorney General of California. The Lynch Report, compiled over a six-month period and released on March 15, 1965, detailed various alleged crimes committed by the club, such as assault, robbery, forgery, car theft and trafficking in narcotics.

In April 1968, almost the entire membership of the Hells Angels' San Diego chapter were indicted on charges of kidnapping, assault, false imprisonment, robbery and rape. The charges related to an incident in which a twenty-eight-year-old woman was abducted from a San Diego bar and taken to a nearby residence, where she was beaten, raped and tortured by several Hells Angels members and their girlfriends.

A woman was allegedly gang raped by four members of the San Diego chapter of the Hells Angels on July 27, 1969. After filing charges against the four, she was subjected to threats and intimidated into leaving the San Diego area, and she refused to testify in court for fear of reprisal.

Members of the San Bernardino Hells Angels chapter, along with bikers from the Straight Satans of Venice, and the Glendale Night Riders, committed a sexual assault on a fifteen-year-old girl in August 1972. On April 5, 1973, Hells Angels members John R. Fisher, Glenn M. Little, John W. Stratton, David L. Winn and Thomas A. Neilly were among eleven motorcycle gang members convicted in Los Angeles of rape and sex perversion.

A woman alleged that she was beaten and assaulted with a rubber dildo by two San Diego Hells Angels members' girlfriends, and that she was forced to orally copulate a Hells Angel and a German Shepherd dog after she accepted a ride home from a biker funeral with the group in 1975. The charges were dismissed as law enforcement were unable to locate the woman after she filed a criminal complaint.

On March 6, 1977, a woman was allegedly stripped of her clothing, beaten and forced to ingest LSD by Hells Angels members and their girlfriends at the residence of the club's San Diego chapter president. She had been accompanied to the residence under the pretense of attending a party after meeting a Hells Angel at an Ocean Beach bar earlier that night.

== Drug trafficking ==
According to the Drug Enforcement Administration (DEA), the Hells Angels began large-scale drug distribution during mid-1967, and soon became the leading manufacturer and distributor of LSD in California. At that time, the HAMC became involved in a drug war with the Gypsy Jokers in the San Francisco Bay Area. The clubs reached an accord that year; the Jokers left California for Oregon, where the Angels agreed to stay out of. The California Department of Justice estimated that the Hells Angels distributed approximately $31 million of narcotics between 1969 and 1972.

Thirty-three members of the Oakland Hells Angels chapter, including the club's president Sonny Barger, and four of their girlfriends were arrested on drug charges after police raided a bar and a duplex apartment in the city on August 30, 1968. $7,000 worth of heroin and $2,500 worth of other narcotics were confiscated, as were firearms – including an M16 rifle, two shotguns and an M1 carbine – and a large cache of ammunition, knives, chains and suspected stolen merchandise. The raids were the result of a three-week investigation.

Hells Angels Oakland chapter president and national leader Sonny Barger was arrested on narcotics charges after Donald Howarth, a film studio property manager and 1967 Mr. America from Studio City, was apprehended while walking towards Barger's Oakland home with seventeen ounces of cocaine and thirty ounces of heroin (with an estimated retail worth of $350,000) in a suitcase on April 11, 1970. Barger temporarily resigned as president of the Oakland chapter in June 1970 to fight the charges, but returned to the position within months after his successor, John "Johnny Angel" Palomar, was sentenced to a ten-year prison term for shooting a bartender. The drug charges against Barger were later dismissed, although Howarth was convicted and sentenced to serve five years-to-life in prison.

Palomar, while deputizing as president of the Oakland HAMC chapter on behalf of Barger, was charged with narcotics and weapons violations after a raid on his home by a police drug squad uncovered small quantities of drugs and a small arsenal of firearms on June 25, 1970. The charges were later dismissed, although he was sentenced to ten years in prison after being convicted of the shooting of a bartender on January 26, 1971.

Oakland Hells Angels members Sonny Barger, Sergey Walton, Donald Duane "Whitey" Smith and "Oakland" Gary Benjamin Popkin were charged with the May 21, 1972, murder of Servio Winston Agero – a drug trafficker from McAllen, Texas, who had travelled to Oakland with a consignment of narcotics for sale – which allegedly occurred following a dispute over an $80,000 cocaine deal. A prosecution witness, Richard Ivaldi, testified that he witnessed Barger shoot Agero dead as he slept at the home of an absent acquaintance, and that Barger subsequently ordered the others to set fire to the residence. The four defendants were acquitted on December 29, 1972, following a seven-week trial after Ivaldi's credibility came under scrutiny. According to Barger's chief attorney James Crew, Ivaldi himself was involved in the conspiracy to kill Agero and, knowing he was a prime suspect and fearing retaliation from the "Texas Mafia", he tried to shift the blame to the Hells Angels. The killing of Agero was one of five possibly linked murders committed in the area around that time. Three men – drug dealers Kelly Patrick Smith, Willard Thomas and Gary Kemp, an acquaintance of Ivaldi – were found shot to death in a house near San Leandro the day after Agero's murder, and the body of a woman, Karen S. Long, was discovered in the trunk of a car in Oakland on May 26. An informant had led investigating detectives to the location of the automobile in which Long's corpse was found. John Joseph Devaney, Long's former husband, was found dead in a car in Hayward on June 14 in an apparent suicide by carbon monoxide poisoning.

Barger was sentenced to a prison term of ten years-to-life on March 16, 1973, after he was convicted of possession of narcotics for sale (thirty-seven grams of heroin), and possession of a weapon by a convicted felon. His girlfriend, Sharon Gruhlke, was a co-defendant; her case ended in a mistrial when a jury failed to reach a verdict. According to police intelligence reports, Barger had designated San Jose chapter president Fillmore Cross as his international successor during a motorcycle run at Bass Lake prior to his imprisonment. Cross was also imprisoned, for possession of amphetamine in 1975, however, and Barger allegedly continued to lead the Hells Angels from his cell at Folsom Prison. Barger was paroled on November 3, 1977, after serving four-and-a-half years of his sentence.

Drug dealer Gail Elmer English and Vallejo HAMC chapter president John Henderson were killed, and another Hells Angel, Ted DeWilde, was left in critical condition as a result of a gun battle at English's Vallejo home on November 1, 1973. English was allegedly killed on the orders of senior San Francisco Bay Area Hells Angels member Kenneth Jay "K.O." Owen for intruding on Owen's narcotics franchise.

Hells Angels associate Henry Crabtree was extradited from Arkansas – where he was charged with the October 18, 1979, murder of Michael Burch – in November 1979 to testify for the government against nine East Bay club members and associates, implicating the bikers in drug dealing which took place between 1968 and mid-1977. Crabtree, who had grossed $100,000 per month from selling methamphetamine he obtained from HAMC members, withdrew from the club's milieu in August 1977 and began cooperating with authorities in January 1978 after learning that Oakland chapter enforcer James Brandes had put a $10,000 contract on his life in the belief that he had turned informant. Members of the Aryan Brotherhood attempted to shoot Crabtree and also interrogated his friends in an effort to collect the bounty. Crabtree testified in front of a grand jury that he and two Hells Angels – Kenneth Owen and Sergey Walton, the Oakland chapter president – stole bottles of phenyl-2-propanone and enough glassware to build five methamphetamine laboratories during a heist at a local chemical company in January 1977.

Douglas Chester Schultz, president of the San Diego Hells Angels, was arrested on October 31, 1985, and indicted on eighteen counts of possession of methamphetamine, intent to distribute and conspiracy. Two employees of Schultz's limousine service, Gerald Robert Ladley and Thomas Longnecker, were also charged with distributing methamphetamine from the business. On April 8, 1986, Schultz and three others were charged with the February 1986 assault of William Eugene Barr, a federal informant in the case. Schultz was sentenced to five years in prison for conspiracy to distribute methamphetamine and using a telephone to facilitate a drug transaction on June 30, 1986. He was one of four members voted out of the San Diego chapter during the fall of that year. The club later reinstated him, however, as they had unknowingly violated their national charter by expelling an incarcerated member.

San Diego Hells Angels chapter president Guy Russell Castiglione and his girlfriend, Kathleen Rebecca Pirelli, were indicted on charges of conspiracy to possess two pounds of methamphetamine with intent to distribute after the drugs were found in Pirelli's purse during a search by U.S. Border Patrol agents at a Temecula checkpoint on May 13, 1989. Castiglione pleaded guilty to the charges on December 20, 1989, while Pirelli pleaded guilty to using a telephone to facilitate a drug transaction. On March 5, 1990, Castiglione was sentenced to five years in federal prison and fined $100,000, and Pirelli was sentenced to two years.

Thirteen members of the Hades Riders MC in Fresno were arrested in July 1989 on narcotics and weapons violations charges. As part of the investigation, authorities seized a methamphetamine lab, along with various amounts of methamphetamine, marijuana and cocaine, as well as forty weapons – including several assault rifles – and evidence showing a conspiracy involving the Hades Rides and the Monterey Hells Angels chapter to distribute methamphetamine.

Odis "Buck" Garrett, president of the Hells Angels' Vallejo-based nomads chapter, and several of his associates were indicted in late 1989 and early 1990 on various narcotics and weapons charges. Garrett was additionally charged with continuing criminal enterprise, money laundering and conspiracy to distribute eleven pounds of methamphetamine to the club's Winston-Salem, North Carolina, chapter. Authorities believed that Hells Angels members and associates were operating a large-scale methamphetamine distribution ring, with clandestine laboratories in San Bernardino, Butte and Modoc counties. Garrett, who oversaw what prosecutors described as the largest methamphetamine manufacturing and distribution case in the United States, made millions of dollars from distributing thousands of kilograms of the drug. He was convicted of various conspiracy, possession, distribution, and interstate drug trafficking charges in June 1992 and was sentenced to life in prison without possibility of parole on September 28, 1992. Former Winston-Salem chapter officer Charles Terry Norman testified against members of his former club in the case, which also resulted in the convictions of Carl Dulinsky and Harris Blane Shimel. Garrett was sentenced to an additional four consecutive life sentences after he was convicted on four counts of murder in an unrelated case on July 26, 1995. He died at FCI Lompoc aged seventy-four on February 12, 2017.

Nine members and associates of the San Diego Hells Angels chapter were indicted on narcotic and weapon violation charges in December 1990. The bikers allegedly manufactured and distributed methamphetamine between Jamul, Indio and Las Vegas, Nevada.

The DEA, along with state and local law enforcement agencies, began investigating the HAMC's San Jose and Grass Valley-based California nomads chapters as a result of intelligence suggesting that the Hells Angels was manufacturing and transporting methamphetamine to Savanna, Georgia. The San Jose and nomads chapter clubhouses were raided, with authorities seizing weapons, 80 pounds of ephedrine, three pounds of methamphetamine, $230,000 in cash. Several club members and associates in California and Georgia were arrested.

Hells Angels member Obediah Breer was arrested on state charges on August 15, 2018, when a police SWAT team executed a search warrant on his Escondido residence and discovered cocaine, methamphetamine, pharmaceutical pills and a firearm. The warrant was based on an incident in which Breer was alleged to have brandished a firearm during a traffic encounter with other motorists on August 5, 2018, and then evaded police officers in a subsequent chase. On September 11, 2018, when Breer was out of custody on pretrial release for the earlier offense, police officers conducted a traffic stop of Breer on his motorcycle and discovered that he was in possession of methamphetamine and cocaine. He was sentenced to twelve years' imprisonment for methamphetamine distribution on June 17, 2019.

On June 25, 2019, Modesto Hells Angels chapter president Randy Picchi, his wife Tina Picchi, Michael Mize, and club prospect Michael Pack were arrested and charged with conspiracy to distribute and possess with intent to distribute methamphetamine. Three other members of the chapter, including the vice-president and secretary, were indicted for various offences on September 19, 2019. Vice-president Michael Shafer was charged with conspiring to distribute marijuana, conspiring to distribute heroin, distribution of marijuana, and two counts of use of a communication facility to facilitate a drug trafficking offense, and secretary Patrick Gonzales was charged with being a felon in possession of firearm and ammunition, while Ricky Blackwell was charged with possession of cocaine with intent to distribute, possession of a firearm in furtherance of a drug trafficking offense, and possession of a firearm after suffering a misdemeanor domestic violence conviction. The case was the result of a months-long investigation into the chapter by the Federal Bureau of Investigation (FBI), Bureau of Alcohol, Tobacco, Firearms and Explosives (ATF), IRS Criminal Investigation and two local police departments. On February 8, 2021, Blackwell was sentenced to six-and-a-half years in prison for possession with intent to distribute cocaine and possession of a firearm in furtherance of a drug trafficking offense.

== Altamont Free Concert ==
One major event in Hells Angels' history involved the December 6, 1969 Altamont Free Concert at the Altamont Speedway – partially documented in the 1970 film Gimme Shelter – featuring Jefferson Airplane, The Flying Burrito Brothers, and The Rolling Stones. The Grateful Dead were also scheduled to perform but cancelled at the last minute owing to the ensuing circumstances at the venue. The Angels had been hired by The Rolling Stones as crowd security for a fee which was said to include $500 worth of beer. The Angels parked their motorcycles in front of the stage in order to create a buffer between the stage and the hundreds of thousands of concertgoers. Crowd management proved to be difficult, resulting in both spectator injury and death. Over the course of the day, the Hells Angels became increasingly agitated as the crowd turned more aggressive. At a later murder trial of Hells Angel Alan Passaro, a security guard testified he heard the Hells Angels being summoned over the loudspeakers when the helicopter bearing The Rolling Stones landed. Debate after the event was over whether the Hells Angels were to manage security for the entire concert or just for The Rolling Stones. Sam Cutler, the Stones' agent who had arranged to pay the Hells Angels said their role was as bodyguards to the Rolling Stones. This was denied by the Hells Angels as well as others connected to the event. During the opening act of Santana, the Hells Angels surged into the crowd numerous times to keep persons off stage. By the time The Rolling Stones took stage, numerous incidents of violence had occurred both between the Hells Angels and internally within the crowd, not the least of which featured a circus performer weighing over 350 pounds stripping naked and running amok amid the concertgoers. Audience members attempted to detain him. Eventually, the irate man was subdued after Angels intervened with fists and makeshift weapons, while a crowd of 4,000–5,000 looked on from the edge of the stage. The aggression did not subside there. After an Angel's motorcycle was toppled, club members' tempers continued to escalate, their ire spread wide between the audience and performers alike. At one point, Marty Balin of Jefferson Airplane was knocked unconscious following an altercation with an Angel, an event later depicted in Gimme Shelter. The Grateful Dead refused to play following the Balin incident, and left the venue. A shoving match erupted near the stage during a rendition of the song "Under My Thumb". As the song began, a man in the audience, Meredith Hunter, was allegedly harassed, then violently pushed back by the Hells Angels. He returned, producing a handgun. Hunter was stabbed to death. A Hells Angel member, Alan Passaro, was later acquitted of murder on grounds of self-defense. After the concert and critical media attention given to the HAMC, Sonny Barger went on a local California radio station to justify the actions of the Hells Angels and to present their side of the story. He claimed that violence only started once the crowd began vandalizing the Hells Angels' motorcycles. Barger would later claim that Hunter fired a shot which struck a Hells Angels member with what he described as "just a flesh wound."

In 2005, after a two-year exhaustive cold-case renewal of the file, the Alameda County District Attorney's office permanently closed the case. An enhanced and slowed down version of the original film footage was produced for the police, and after examining it, Alameda County Sheriff's Office sergeant Scott Dudek said Passaro, who died in 1985, was the only person to stab Hunter and he did so only after Hunter pointed a handgun at the stage where the Stones were performing. Alan Passaro is the only person who stabbed Meredith Hunter, Dudek said, adding that Passaro's lawyer confirmed his client was the sole assailant. "Passaro acted with a knife to stop Meredith Hunter from shooting."

== Gang wars ==
=== Gypsy Jokers ===
After becoming involved in the large-scale distribution of narcotics, the Hells Angels fought against the Gypsy Jokers for control of the drug trade in the San Francisco Bay Area. The drug war concluded in 1967 when an accord was reached between the clubs; the Gypsy Jokers left California for Oregon, which the Hells Angels agreed to cede to their rivals.

On June 29, 1969, members of the Hells Angels and the Gypsy Jokers brawled in San Francisco's Golden Gate Park. A Hells Angel biker, Gino Heinicke, was shot dead during the fight. Eight Gypsy Jokers were charged with murder, assault, and conspiracy to assault with a deadly weapon. The defendants maintained that they had defended themselves after being attacked by the Hells Angels.

=== Axemen ===
In 1970, during a conflict with the Axemen motorcycle gang, San Diego Hells Angels chapter vice president Andrew Horn was shot and killed with a sawed-off shotgun by Axemen biker Rick McCart, who was acquitted of the killing and subsequently fled the area. In 1975, several Axemen members survived the bombing of their clubhouse via a remote-controlled explosive device. An Axemen member was shot dead as he rode his motorcycle the following year. According to a police informant and former Hells Angel, the murder was committed by the San Diego Hells Angels.

=== Mongols ===
The Hells Angels became involved in a dispute with the Mongols after the rival club began wearing a California "bottom rocker" – a patch displayed on a biker's "colors" denoting the club's territory. The Mongols had previously listed only individual chapter locations on their "colors", and the Hells Angels asserted that they were the only club allowed to wear a California patch as they were the dominant club in the state. The Mongols objected to this, infuriating the Angels. The Hells Angels declared war on the Mongols at a meeting on July 7, 1977. The conflict would result in the deaths of four Mongols members and an innocent fifteen-year-old boy. Mongols member Allyn Bishop was shot off his motorcycle in Kern County on July 29, 1977. Two other members of the Mongols' San Diego chapter – Raymond "Jingles" Smith and chapter president Emerson "Redbeard" Morris – were shot with an ArmaLite AR-15 assault rifle while riding their motorcycles on Interstate 15 near Escondido on September 5, 1977. One man died at the scene while the other died at Palomar Medical Center. The two bikers' spouses, who were riding on the back of their motorcycles, were wounded; Morris' wife Delores was left paralyzed. On September 9, 1977, a van bomb was detonated at the funeral of Morris and Smith in Lemon Grove, injuring two Mongols members and the father of a member. Mongols member Henry Jimenez and Raymond Hernandez, the fifteen-year-old brother of another biker, were killed in an explosion after Jimenez began working on a tire rigged with a bomb at a motorcycle repair shop in Highland Park, Los Angeles on September 24, 1977. Days later, San Fernando Valley Mongols chapter president Luis Gutierrez survived a car bombing outside his home. The violence led to a crackdown by law enforcement, and on October 7, 1977, 32 members and associates of the San Diego Hells Angels were arrested on various charges, including chapter president Thomas James "Crunch" Renzulli who was charged with attempted murder. Fourteen of those arrested were "patch holding" members of the San Diego chapter. The arrests followed a ten-month investigation of the club, which involved infiltration by a police informant. Six sticks of dynamite were discovered attached to the vehicle of a San Diego Mongols member on October 11, 1977. ATF agents matched the bomb components to the explosives given to the informant by Renzulli on September 30. Five Hells Angels members – including "Gorgeous" Guy Russell Castiglione, James "Brett" Eaton and Thomas James Renzulli – were indicted on racketeering and conspiracy charges in September 1982. The indictment alleges the group were responsible for the murders of Morris and Smith as well as the bombing of their funeral. Another Hells Angel, Thomas Heath, was convicted in 1994 of two counts of second-degree murder for the killings of Hernandez and Jimenez. He was sentenced to seven years in prison.

The Mongols seized control of Southern California from the Hells Angels during the 1980s. San Diego Hells Angels sergeant-at-arms Raymond "Fat Ray" Piltz became the Angels' first casualty in the conflict when he was shot and killed in a biker bar in Lemon Grove on January 17, 1982. Five Mongols members were indicted over his death, and one – Bill Michael "Mike" Munz – was convicted of involuntary manslaughter and sentenced to six years in prison.

In an attempt to end the hostilities between the clubs, the Hells Angels and the Mongols agreed to a truce, in which the Angels yielded much of Southern California to the Mongols. Under the terms of the truce, the Angels retained their charters in Monterey, Orange County, Riverside, Fresno, Ventura, San Diego and San Bernardino, but allowed the Mongols free rein over the rest of the Southern California and gave their rivals permission to wear a California "rocker". The Mongols, in turn, promised not to establish any chapters in Northern California. However, the Hells Angels harbored a desire for revenge against the Mongols having ceded territorial dominance to their rivals.

The feud was reactivated when 50 to 100 members of the rival clubs clashed at a motorcycle trade show in Long Beach on February 10, 1989, resulting in San Bernardino Hells Angels chapter sergeant-at-arms Aristeo Andres "Art" Carbajal being stabbed to death and several others wounded. No suspects have been arrested in the murder.

In 2001, members of the Hells Angels and the Mongols were holding a "coalition meeting" at a biker club convention in El Cajon when a Mongol biker drew a knife and stabbed a Hells Angel, causing new tensions between the gangs.

Hells Angels member Christian Harvey Tate was killed when several gunshots fired from another vehicle struck him in the back while he was riding his motorcycle on Interstate 40 near Ludlow on April 27, 2002. He had been returning to San Diego after attending the Laughlin River Run motorcycle rally. Although police surmised at the time that Tate's death was connected to the River Run riot, a fatal confrontation between members of the Hells Angels and the Mongols which occurred in Laughlin, Nevada, earlier that day, the homicide has gone unsolved.

Seventeen members and associates of the Hells Angels in San Diego County were arrested on June 11, 2003, as a result of a two-year investigation into drug trafficking and racketeering. The HAMC clubhouse in El Cajon was raided as part of the operation. Federal wiretaps also recorded club members planning to kill Mongols members in retaliation for the murder of Christian Tate. Ten HAMC members, including San Diego chapter president Guy Russell Castiglione and sergeant-at-arms Mark Alan Toycen, pleaded guilty to conspiracy. Castiglione was sentenced to seventy months' imprisonment on September 22, 2005, and Toycen was sentenced to fourteen years' on July 28, 2006. The convictions effectively dismantled the chapter.

A two-year ATF investigation of the HAMC resulted in the arrests of twenty-six club members in the San Fernando Valley, San Francisco and Ventura County on December 3, 2003, on racketeering charges filed at the U.S. District Court for the District of Nevada and stemming from the River Run riot. Nine Hells Angels, including the chapter president and three officers, were arrested in the San Fernando Valley and another seventeen were taken into custody in northern California. The arrests were carried out as part of a five-state operation involving over 700 federal, state and municipal law enforcement officers which resulted in the arrests of fifty-seven Hells Angels across the country and the seizure of approximately 125 firearms, more than a thousand rounds of ammunition, several stolen vehicles and a quarter-pound of methamphetamine. Three Californian Angels – Maurice "Pete" Eunice, Raymond Foakes and James Hannigan – were among the six club members convicted of committing a violent crime in the aid of racketeering following their extradition to Las Vegas, Nevada, to face charges. On February 13, 2007, Eunice was sentenced to two-and-a-half years' imprisonment and Foakes was sentenced to twelve months', while Hannigan was sentenced to two years' on February 23, 2007. Charges were dismissed against the remaining thirty-six defendants in the case.

In 2008, Mark "Papa" Guardado, the president of the San Francisco chapter, was shot dead after a bar fight in the Mission District of San Francisco. Christopher Bryan Ablett, a member of the rival Mongols MC club, was later arrested for Guardado's murder.

On May 21, 2017, Mongols member Joshua Herbert exited a car driven by another, unidentified, man and opened fire with a revolver on a group of five Hells Angels members who were refuelling their motorcycles at a Shell gas station in Riverside, killing Orange County Hells Angel James Duty and wounding another. The incident followed a series of shootings and attempted murders between the clubs over the previous eight months in Orange and Los Angeles counties. After a month-long investigation by the Riverside Police Department, FBI, ATF and California Department of Justice, Herbert was charged with murder and firearm offenses June 21, 2017.

=== Aryan Brotherhood ===
Oakland Hells Angels chapter vice-president Michael O'Farrell was killed after being stabbed in the neck, chest and back, and shot four times from behind at a San Leandro bar on June 6, 1989. Another Hells Angels member, Michael Musick, was wounded in the attack. Police stated that O'Farrell's killing may have been the result of a power struggle between the HAMC and the Aryan Brotherhood in the East Bay. Two Aryan Brotherhood members charged with O'Farrell's homicide, Aaron "Jerry" Marsh and Michael Bruce "Tank" Shepherd, were arrested in the following weeks. Marsh was taken into custody in Manteca on June 27, and Shepherd was apprehended by San Bernardino County Sheriff's Department deputies and California Highway Patrol troopers on Route 60 on July 26 after a high-speed chase through Chino and Ontario. Shepherd allegedly admitted his guilt in the killing to his lawyer Steven Gore. Marsh was strangled to death in Pelican Bay State Prison on July 25, 1997, by cellmate Gary J. Littrell after refusing an order from the Aryan Brotherhood leadership to murder another inmate, and Shepherd committed suicide by hanging himself in his cell at Santa Ana Central Jail in December 2004 shortly after pleading guilty in a RICO case.

=== Vagos ===
On October 26, 2001, a fight between a small group of Hells Angels and Vagos escalated into a mass brawl involving up to 80 participants at a motorcycle swap meet held at the Orange County Fairgrounds in Costa Mesa. Motorcycle parts such as handlebars and tail pipes were used as weapons in the melee, which ended when officers from four local police departments and the Orange County Sheriff's Department arrived at the scene approximately five minutes after the fighting began and bikers began to flee. A man was arrested on suspicion of assaulting a police officer, and two injured people were treated at the scene. Investigators were unable to determine the amount of property damage and the number of people injured due to a lack of cooperation from witnesses. It was also unclear if members of the Mongols, who also attended the swap meet, became involved.

In 2011, president of the San Jose chapter Jeffrey Pettigrew, was shot four times in the back on September 23, 2011, at a casino in Sparks, Nevada. Two California members of the Vagos motorcycle club at the crime scene were also shot but survived. Pettigrew was in Sparks for 'Street Vibrations', a long-running motorcycle festival in the Reno area. Sparks declared a state of emergency after another motorcyclist wearing Vagos colors was shot shortly afterwards in the stomach from a passing vehicle. Cesar Villagrana, who had been with Pettigrew, was charged with discharging a firearm and other offenses. Ernesto Manuel Gonzales was later arrested in San Francisco in connection with the death of Pettigrew. Another Hell's Angel, Steve Tausan, an "enforcer" for the Santa Cruz chapter, was shot at Pettigrew's funeral. According to police, after the shooting, the suspect, Steve Ruiz, disappeared and one or more people tampered with the crime scene, washing away bloodstains and removing evidence of the shooting.

Hells Angels member James Vincent Dickson was among five people arrested after a shooting at the Third Street Tavern in Highland on November 6, 2021, which left three people injured, including two of the suspects. On April 24, 2022, Dickson was killed and three others were wounded in a shooting at the Marquis Lounge in San Bernardino. In an incident that law enforcement theorized was carried out in retaliation for Dickson's killing, six Vagos and one Hells Angel were injured when a group of Angels opened fire on Vagos bikers on U.S. Route 95 in Henderson, Nevada, on May 29, 2022.

== Infighting ==
=== Redwood Regional Park case ===
On January 22, 1972, five Oakland Hells Angels – Sonny Barger, Russell Stanley Beyea, Bobby V. "the Durt" England, Gary Benjamin Popkin and Bert Samuel Stefanson – were charged with attempted murder, kidnapping and assault with a deadly weapon after being arrested while driving through Redwood Regional Park by police and park rangers who discovered two bound, gagged and beaten club prospects – William D. Hood and Danny Jarman – in the trunk of the vehicle. All five pleaded guilty to a lesser charge of unlawful imprisonment.

=== Hells Angels graveyard at Ukiah ===
In September 1972, Hells Angels member William "Whispering Bill" Pifer, who was suffering from terminal throat cancer while incarcerated at Alameda County jail in Dublin on various state and federal charges, offered police information on a Hells Angels burial ground in exchange for immunity from prosecution in order to spend the remainder of his life as a free man. His testimony led Mendocino County deputies to a ranch, owned by former Oakland Hells Angels chapter vice-president George J. "Baby Huey" Wethern and his wife Helen, near Ukiah, where they discovered the bodies of two club prospects – Charles "Charlie" Baker and Thomas Shepherd "Big Tom" Shull – and a woman, Patricia Ann McNight, in abandoned wells on October 30 and November 1, 1972.

Baker and Shull had been beaten and strangled to death by Pifer and other members of the club's Richmond chapter after being spiked with LSD at a party on January 15, 1971, while McNight was killed by a gunshot to the head. Police also seized cocaine and stolen firearms at the ranch. Wethern and his wife were charged with drug and stolen property possession, and four other Hells Angels – Edward "Junior" Carter, Chester M. "Festus" Green, William Mark "Zorro" Mitten and William John Moran – were charged with murder and accessory to murder. Wethern became a government witness and the charges against him and his wife were dismissed.

While in protective custody on November 7, 1972, Wethern attempted to blind himself by gouging pencils into his eyes before attempting to strangle his wife. Carter pleaded guilty to accessory to murder, and charges against Green and Mitten were dropped. On April 5, 1973, Moran was convicted of the murder of Baker and acquitted of Shull's murder. Pifer died after the first few days of the trial, during which Green testified for the prosecution. Richmond chapter president "Rotten" Richard Allen Barker was convicted of first-degree murder and involuntary manslaughter in the deaths of Baker and Schull in 1975.

=== DeWilde murder ===
Theodore L. "Ted" DeWilde, president of the Vallejo Hells Angels chapter, was indicted on federal gun law violation charges in June 1973 after allegedly selling two dynamite bombs and a machine gun to an undercover federal agent. He initially pleaded guilty to the charges and was scheduled to be sentenced in May 1974, but judge Philip C. Wilkins granted a motion by DeWilde's lawyer allowing him to withdraw the guilty plea and demand a jury trial. DeWilde later disappeared, allegedly murdered, welded inside a fifty-five-gallon drum and disposed of in the San Francisco Bay by his fellow Hells Angels who became concerned that methamphetamine addiction and pending prison time may have caused him to cooperate with authorities.

=== Myhre murder ===
Vallejo Hells Angels chapter president Dennis C. Myhre was one of five men charged with various counts of rape and sex perversion in relation to a January 13, 1974, sexual assault reported by a twenty-three-year-old Richmond woman. The victim in the case died of a heroin overdose two days after attorney Hugh Comisky, who was retained as counsel for one of the accused, inadvertently revealed her home address during pretrial proceedings. Myhre later disappeared. According to informants, he was killed by the Hells Angels, who believed that he was cooperating with authorities.

=== Prater murders ===
Oakland Hells Angels chapter member Ray Dale "Stork" Keefauver, who had been scheduled to testify for the prosecution in a Redwood City murder trial, was found shot to death in a ravine near Port Costa on June 16, 1974. On August 24, the bodies of Hells Angels associate Alvin Lloyd Prater and his wife Mary Ellen (née Kanihan) were discovered by the side of a road near Sunol. They had each been fatally shot in the head two days earlier after being handcuffed and beaten.

Alvin Prater was allegedly killed over the theft of an engine block from a Harley-Davidson motorcycle belonging to a Hells Angels member. In June 1979, James Ezekiel "Jim-Jim" Brandes, an enforcer and senior member of the HAMC's Oakland chapter, was charged with the murders of Keefauver and the Praters as part of a racketeering case against the club. Brandes, who was implicated in a total of four of five homicides, was ultimately never convicted of any. The initial trial ended in a mistrial in July 1980 as did the subsequent retrial in February 1981. He later hanged himself in prison c. 1994. The murders remain unsolved.

=== Robles murder ===
Mark Gary Robles, sergeant-at-arms of the Hells Angels' San Diego chapter, was fatally shot several times in the back before his body was discovered in his parked van in San Diego's Clairemont neighborhood in October 1976. Three former Hells Angels later told investigators that Robles was killed by a fellow club member, Douglas Chester "Dutch" Schultz, with approval from the Oakland "mother chapter" during an internal dispute.

=== Flamburis and Barrett murders ===
San Francisco Hells Angels chapter president Harry "the Horse" Flamburis and his girlfriend, Dannette Barrett, were each shot in the head and killed after being bound at their home in Daly City on January 6, 1977. $22,000 worth of cocaine and a quantity of LSD was also stolen from a safe at the house. Prior to his death, Flamburis had resisted the Hells Angels' move into prostitution and narcotics racketeering. His successor was San Francisco chapter president, "Flash" Gordon Gary Grow, who operated a brothel in partnership with Odis "Buck" Garrett, president of the Nomads chapter in Vallejo.

Flamburis was laid to rest at Cypress Lawn Memorial Park in Colma on January 15, and his Harley-Davidson motorcycle was buried with him three months later on April 22. His funeral was attended by approximately 200 members of the Hells Angels and other motorcycle clubs from as far away as Hawaii, Anchorage, Alaska, and Lowell, Massachusetts. Although police at the time suspected two or three possible motives, The murders have never been solved. The house in which Flamburis and Barrett were killed was burned down in an apparent arson on April 24, 1977. Investigators linked the killing to the quadruple murder of the Compton family on August 7, 1977, in Gaston, Oregon as an identical modus operandi was used by the killers, as were similar weapons.

=== Glore murder ===
Three members of the Hells Angels' Los Angeles chapter were arrested on January 6, 1978, in connection with the theft of two thousand pounds of dynamite, which was stolen from a construction site in San Diego County in September 1977. The trio were found in possession of the stolen explosives, as well as a machine gun and other weapons. Following the seizure, search warrants were served on the residences of all known members of the Los Angeles Hells Angels. When serving a warrant at the home of chapter president Ora Ray "Indian Ray" Glore, police found him dead with nine .22 caliber bullet wounds to the head. Officers discovered files on every Hells Angels member in the United States and Europe at Glore's residence. According to a statement given to investigators by one of the Hells Angels arrested in the explosives seizure, "Old Man" John Noble, Glore was assassinated over a personal dispute with Russell Beyea, a senior member of the Oakland Hells Angels. Noble claimed to have been present at a meeting of California chapter officers in Oakland at which a majority of the participants voted in favor of killing Glore.

== Arms trafficking ==
Bert Stefanson and Sergey C. Walton, both members of the Hells Angels' Oakland chapter, were charged with weapons and narcotics violations when police found loaded pistols, hand grenades, tear gas canisters, blasting caps, three bags of cocaine and $8,911 in cash in the car in which they were travelling after they were stopped for speeding in Sacramento in March 1972. Walton pleaded guilty to cocaine possession and appeared as a witness during the trial of Stefanson, who was convicted on five felony charges of possessing narcotics and transporting explosives on February 16, 1973.

Members of the San Diego Hells Angels chapter were suspected in the theft of 2,000 pounds of dynamite from a construction site in San Diego County in September 1977. On January 6, 1978, three members of the Hells Angels' Los Angeles chapter were arrested in possession of a case of the stolen dynamite as well as a machine gun and other weapons. Law enforcement subsequently served search warrants on the residences of all known Hells Angels members in Los Angeles. Officers serving a warrant at the home of Los Angeles chapter president Ora Ray "Indian Ray" Glore discovered his corpse; he had been shot in the head. Glore's unsolved killing was reportedly carried out by members of his own club.

Oakland chapter member Sergey Walton was arrested in October 1979 and convicted in March 1980 of possessing a machine gun. He fled from San Francisco County Jail on March 24, 1981, while awaiting transfer to a federal prison in Illinois to begin serving an eight-year sentence. His disappearance was not discovered until March 28, 1981, when he was scheduled to be transferred. On May 28, 1981, Walton was apprehended by the Bureau of Alcohol, Tobacco, Firearms and Explosives (ATF) and the U.S. Marshals Service at a cabin at Ben Lomond in the Santa Cruz Mountains. Two women found in the cabin with Walton – Kimberly Lee "Kimbra" Townsend and Laufey Gayle Owen, the wife of HAMC member Kenneth Owen – were charged with harboring a fugitive. Two machine guns and accompanying ammunition were also found. Walton was sentenced in February 1983 for the jailbreak to ten years in prison to be served consecutively with the prior eight-year sentence. He later became a government witness and entered the Federal Witness Protection Program. Former deputy sheriff Louis "Lou" Ivankovich pleaded guilty on February 18, 1983, to conspiring to aid Walton in his escape. He was sentenced to three years in federal prison. Walton died on October 19, 2006, aged sixty-two.

In November 1981, a task force of federal, state and local law enforcement officers raided a Hells Angels clubhouse in San Diego and confiscated machine guns, shotguns, more than fifty handguns, explosives, explosives manuals, torture kits, electronic eavesdropping equipment, police radio scanners and narcotics.

== Violent incidents ==
Hells Angels member Robert Lee "Wildman" Bright was charged with criminal mayhem after he, aided by two other inmates, used a spoon heated on a hot plate to burn a tattoo, which resembled the HAMC insignia, off of a cellmate's arm on October 29, 1973, at San Diego County jail, where he was awaiting trial on a narcotics charge. Bright, a Marine Corps veteran of the Vietnam War, died of natural causes at the age of sixty in Humboldt County on April 10, 2006.

Two members of the San Diego Hells Angels chapter – Michael Varner, the chapter president, and his brother John G. Varner – were shot to death by an unidentified gunman in a tavern in Modesto on November 6, 1973. Police were unable to establish a motive for the killings.

A Hells Angels member was hospitalized with a skull fracture and multiple abrasions when he was beaten unconscious by a group of bar patrons after he brandished a hunting knife following a disagreement with another patron at an East San Diego bar on January 26, 1975. On February 16, a heating and air conditioning company owned by the patron and his partner in Santee was targeted in an arson attack, which law enforcement believe was carried out by the HAMC in retaliation for the injuries suffered by the Hells Angel in the earlier incident.

Hells Angels member Gerald "Butch" Lester shot two people in a van in Sacramento County on October 26, 1977, killing one and wounding the other. Lester used a sleeping bag to conceal his victims' bodies and then dumped their vehicle in a river. The incident, for which Lester spent four years in state prison, was reportedly the result of a dispute over $5,000 worth of methamphetamine.

Laurence Richard "Large Larry" Lajeunesse, a senior member of the Hells Angels' San Fernando Valley chapter, and his girlfriend Tammie Ann Brannigan were shot to death in the converted industrial garage in Chatsworth, Los Angeles where they lived on December 3, 1998, by Daniel Ray Waring, who was described by prosecutors as an aspirant Hells Angels member involved in a feud with Lajeunesse over methamphetamine dealing. Waring robbed and killed the couple, shooting Lajeunesse five or six times in the head before also shooting Brannigan to eliminate her as a witness. Waring, a tow truck driver who worked as an informant for California Highway Patrol detectives for over ten years, was convicted of first-degree murder on October 12, 2001, and sentenced to two consecutive life prison terms without the possibility of parole on February 8, 2002. He died aged 60 on September 27, 2017. The case was documented in the North Mission Road episode "Hells Angels Mystery", which aired on August 22, 2005.

In 2001, eleven men associated with the Hells Angels in Fresno were arrested for allegedly assaulting members of another motorcycle club that had ignored their order to disband.

Ventura Hells Angels chapter member Thomas Heath was sentenced to thirty-five years to life in prison in February 2012 after being convicted of a fifth strike offense. In 1992, he was sentenced to seven years' imprisonment after being convicted of assault with a deadly weapon and dissuading a witness by threats for the beating of his wife at a hamburger stand. Heath was sentenced to an additional seven years' in 1994 when he pleaded guilty to two counts of first-degree murder for killing a rival biker and an innocent bystander with a bomb in Los Angeles on September 24, 1977, during a war with the Mongols. On November 22, 2010, he threatened the lives of his female roommate and her son, a crime for which he was found guilty on December 16, 2011, of dissuading a witness, threatening a witness and street terrorism.

On June 6, 2023, a group of Hells Angels allegedly attacked three African American men in the Ocean Beach neighborhood of San Diego. One of the victims was stabbed, another was beaten unconscious, and the third managed to flee. 17 Hells Angels members and associates were arrested on September 17, 2023, charged with carrying out the attack in association with a criminal street gang. In June, 2025, Hell's Angel member Troy Scholder was convicted of attempted murder, assault, and a hate crime allegation for stabbing a young black male victim in the chest during the above incident (https://www.nbcsandiego.com/news/local/hells-angels-member-sentenced-ocean-beach-attack/3842545/

== Murders ==
=== Bradley Parkhurst ===
Three Hells Angels members and one of their girlfriends were charged on March 8, 1972, with the murder of 27-year-old Bradley Parkhurst, an Alameda longshoreman who was beaten and stomped to death in the basement of an Oakland home on February 24. Parkhurst had arrived at the residence of Connie Perry, a Hells Angel's girlfriend, to inspect a motorcycle and was killed by HAMC members Russell Beyea and "Mouldy" Marvin William Gilbert after Gilbert took offence to a "nigger's handshake" from Parkhurst, who was pronounced dead at Highland Hospital. It is believed that, due to Beyea's status as a senior Hells Angel, Gilbert was pressured by the club to testify and exculpate Beyea during the trial. Despite his testimony, both Gilbert and Beyea were convicted of second-degree murder on August 17, 1972. Following the jury's verdict, a Hells Angels member approached Gilbert and threatened his life in the presence of a deputy sheriff due to his failure to exonerate Beyea. Gilbert later moved to Spokane, Washington, becoming vice-president of the Hells Angels chapter there, and died at the age of sixty-five on June 22, 2007.

=== Compton family ===
In 1976, a young woman from Solano County named Margo Compton escaped an abusive relationship with her husband Doug Compton, a Hells Angels "hang-around" and methamphetamine addict, by taking refuge along with her twin daughters, Sylvia and Sandra, with Odis "Buck" Garrett, the president of the Hells Angels Nomads chapter in Vallejo. In order to pay off a $5,000 debt for amphetamine given to her on consignment by Garrett, as well as room and board provided, Compton was forced to begin working at the "Love Nest", a Hells Angels-owned massage parlor in the Tenderloin district of San Francisco, where she was required to perform sex acts on patrons. Garrett, a pimp and drug dealer, kept Sylvia and Sandra captive at his El Sobrante home until Margo accumulated enough money to settle her debt.

Compton began a relationship with auto dealer Don Seslar, who offered to help her after she was beaten and raped by a patron. The couple contacted the Contra Costa County Sheriff's Office, who retrieved and returned Sylvia and Sandra. Compton agreed to testify against Garrett and the Hells Angels, and the Love Nest was raided on December 8, 1976. Garrett and three others were arrested and charged with pimping and pandering. Compton, Seslar and the twins subsequently took refuge at a cottage in Laurelwood, Oregon, a small religious community 25 miles southwest of Portland. In Laurelwood, Compton worked for the state Children's Services Division under the alias "Linda Diaz". She wrote a 72-page diary, copies of which she distributed to media outlets and the San Francisco prosecutor's office, and also recorded an audio diary.

During the summer of 1977, Compton testified in San Francisco against four men and a woman regarding her employment at the Love Nest. Her testimony led to three convictions. In July 1977, Compton testified on behalf of the prosecution in a California state criminal prosecution that she and four other women working at the parlor were being pimped by the Hells Angels, and that the operation was under the protection of two San Francisco Police Department (SFPD) vice squad officers who were bribed with cash and sexual favors. She received threats from Garrett against herself and her daughters, and rumors circulated that a murder contract had been placed on her life.

After learning of Compton's whereabouts, Garrett recruited two bikers from the Bay Area, Robert G. "Bugeye Bob" McClure and Benjamin Wai "Psycho" Silva, to kill Compton and her daughters. McClure, a Hells Angels "wannabe" who was in debt to Garrett, accepted the murder contract in exchange for two pounds of methamphetamine and the repaying of his debt. Garrett provided McClure and Silva with two cars and two guns—a .357 Magnum and a .22 caliber. On August 7, 1977, 24-year-old Margo, six-year-old twins Sylvia and Sandra, and Gary Seslar, the 19-year-old son of Don Seslar who was visiting while on leave from the Coast Guard, were each shot dead execution-style with the .22 caliber handgun after being bound with rope at their Laurelwood home. Seslar was killed first, and then the girls were shot as their mother was forced to watch before she was executed. Don Seslar was in El Paso, Texas at the time of the killings. The following afternoon, the dying Gary Seslar and deceased Compton were discovered by Seslar's fiancée, Bonnie Sleeper, in the living room of the residence. Police later found Sylvia and Sandra dead in one of the bedrooms. The murder weapon used by McClure and Silva's unused .357 Magnum were later thrown into the Klamath River outside Weed.

Although Garrett was the prime suspect, he had established an alibi for himself at the time of the murders by racing up and down the street in front of his house on his motorcycle in order to receive a citation to prove his whereabouts. Although Compton was dead, her recorded testimony was used to convict Garrett. In October 1977, he was found guilty of pimping and pandering. He was sentenced on November 10, 1977, to two years in prison. In the years following his release from prison on September 15, 1979, Garrett ascended in the Hells Angels organization as he became a millionaire producer and dealer of methamphetamine.

The quadruple murders were investigated by Detective Sergeant Mike Graham of the Washington County Sheriff's Department in Oregon, along with Solano County Sheriff's Office Detectives Dick Grundy and Bill Zerby. As no fingerprints matching any known suspects were found at the crime scene, and no murder weapon was retrieved, the killings became a cold case. Numerous potential witnesses in the case also died, such as Doug Compton who died of pneumonia after being hit in the head with a hatchet at his home in Benicia in 1987. In 1984, Aryan Brotherhood council member and confidential prison informant Michael "Iron Mike" Thompson provided Graham with details of the murder he had been told by Garrett. According to Thompson, Garrett had confessed to him about the murders in Folsom State Prison, while McClure had boasted of carrying out the killings while serving a sentence for a drug conviction at San Quentin State Prison. In 1991, Garrett and McClure were charged with the murders. McClure was arrested in Stockton, while Garrett was taken into custody while being held in Sacramento jail on charges of running a string of methamphetamine laboratories. On September 28, 1992, Garrett was sentenced to life in federal prison without possibility of parole after being convicted of overseeing what prosecutors called the largest methamphetamine manufacturing and distribution case in the United States. Silva was never charged in the case because prosecutors felt it was not worth the expense and effort as he was already awaiting execution at San Quentin for the 1981 kidnapping, rape, torture, and murder of two college students in Lassen County, Kevin Thorpe and Laura Craig. Silva's conviction was overturned in 2005 due to prosecutorial misconduct during the original trial. He pleaded no contest to the murders of Thorpe and Craig in 2007 and was resentenced to 25 years to life.

Over forty witnesses, including former Aryan Brotherhood leaders Clifford Smith and Mike Thompson, testified during each of the trials, held in Hillsboro, Oregon. According to prosecutors, Garrett had ordered the killings of Compton and her daughters in retaliation for her testimony without approval from the Hells Angels leadership. Seslar was killed because he happened to be present at the time of the murders. Thompson claimed that the Aryan Brotherhood had been approached by Hells Angels leaders in California to carry out the murders but had turned down the contract because of their unwillingness to kill children. On July 30, 1994, McClure was convicted of quadruple murder and sentenced to four consecutive life terms. Garrett was also sentenced to four consecutive life sentences in prison after being found guilty on four counts of murder on July 26, 1995.

Additionally, Garrett was a suspect in the possible homicide of Rhonda Lynn Yocom, a 19-year-old Filipina American woman who was last seen getting into a car with Garrett in Oroville on February 10, 1985, before she disappeared. Garrett was purported to be taking Yocom to the Klamath Falls, Oregon area in order for her to flee the state to avoid a court appearance in a criminal matter. She has never been located and it is believed that she was the victim of a homicide. Garret died in prison at the age of 74 on February 12, 2017.

=== Maureen and Telesforo Bautista ===
Los Angeles Hells Angels member and methamphetamine manufacturer Robert Frederick Garceau stabbed to death his girlfriend Maureen Bautista and her fourteen-year-old son Telesforo in a Bakersfield apartment on September 6 or 7, 1984 after Bautista threatened to inform her former lover, drug dealer Eddie Nash, of Garceau's whereabouts and drug operation. Nash had previously paid Garceau to fulfill a contract which he failed to perform, and Nash was subsequently searching for Garceau. Two of Garceau's acquaintances, Greg Rambo and Larry Tom Whittington, disposed of the bodies by placing them inside a hollow bedroom dresser which was then buried beneath a layer of concrete in the yard behind Rambo's residence in Shandon. Garceau shot and killed Rambo, one of his drug business partners, in Monterey County on February 19, 1985, after he became concerned that Rambo may become an informant. Garceau and another acquaintance, Harlyn Codd, then deposited Rambo's body in a ravine at Deer Creek in Tulare County. In view of Rambo's disappearance and fearing for her own life, his wife, Susan, contacted the Kern County Sheriff's Office on March 6, 1985. Her statements led to the excavation of the Bautistas' bodies on March 8, 1985, and the arrest of Garceau in Gorman on March 14, 1985.

In 1987, Garceau was sentenced to death in Kern County for the Bautista murders, and an additional thirty-three-years-to-life in Monterey County for Rambo's murder. He died from cancer at the age of fifty-eight on December 29, 2004, while on death row at San Quentin State Prison.

=== Grondalski family ===
On October 5, 1986, former Hells Angels member William Ivan "Billy" Grondalski, his wife Patricia ("Patty"), five-year-old daughter Dallas and seventeen-year-old stepson Nolan Jerami Vandagriff were murdered in their home near Fort Bragg by Gerald Michael "Butch" Lester and Charles Anthony "Chuck" Diaz, the president and vice-president, respectively, of the Vallejo Hells Angels chapter. Billy Grondalski, Patty Grondalski and Vandagriff were each killed by a single gunshot wound to the head from Lester, while Dallas Grondalski died as a result of multiple stab wounds from Diaz, which severed her spinal cord and caused a near-decapitation. She was also shot by Lester post-mortem. Billy Grondalski had been expelled by the Vallejo Hells Angels on September 28, less than a week before the massacre, and Lester and Diaz had come to his home to retrieve a monetary debt, his motorcycle and items of club property in his possession – $900 worth of HAMC support decals and a Hells Angels tattoo on his left arm, reading "84 In, 86 Out". According to investigators, Grondalski was ousted from the HAMC due to a drug debt. Lester and Diaz later claimed that the killings at the Grondalski home began after a .45 caliber pistol that Lester was using to threaten Billy Grondalski accidentally discharged, killing him instantly, and that the remaining family members were killed to eliminate witnesses. After his death, Grondalski's Hells Angels tattoo was severed from his body and later disposed of by Lester in the toilet of a recreational vehicle owned by associates of his. The handgun used in the killings was melted down with a blowtorch and the slag was scattered over several northern California counties by Michael W. "Little Mike" Tankersley, a member of the Hells Angels' Sonoma County chapter. The day after the murders, Lester and Sonoma County Hells Angels member "Big Arm" Charles Francis Haas returned to the home and set fire to it in an effort to destroy evidence. The corpses of the family were discovered by firefighters responding to the blaze.

Haas implicated Diaz and Lester in the murders after becoming a cooperating witness for the government in February 1994 while awaiting sentencing on a federal drug conviction relating to a large-scale methamphetamine ring in Virginia. He was granted immunity from prosecution in the Grondalski case other than for the murders in return for his testimony, and also hoped for a reduced sentence in the drug case. Haas was sentenced to twenty-seven years' imprisonment on March 31, 1994. On May 5, 1995, Diaz, by then the Vallejo chapter president, was arrested in Ukiah and Lester was apprehended in Fort Smith, Arkansas, where he was living after leaving the club in June 1987. They were each charged with four counts of murder. Tankersley also emerged as a witness in February 1996 when he was arrested in Arkansas on a fugitive warrant for assault charges he faced in Marin and Sonoma counties. He was also charged with three counts of attempted capital murder after he used his vehicle to ram the car of the police officers who arrested him. Tankersley had been expelled from the Sonoma County Hells Angels in 1987 and fled the state to escape retribution from the club and also to avoid criminal prosecution. Due to his testimony, the attempted murder charges against him were reduced to three counts of aggravated assault, for which he was sentenced to serve six years' imprisonment, with three-and-a-half years suspended, concurrent to any sentence stemming from the assault charges in California, from which he ultimately escaped prosecution. Following two mistrials, Lester was convicted of four counts of murder on November 6, 1997. He was sentenced on January 23, 1998, to four life terms at the maximum-security Pelican Bay State Prison. Charges against Diaz were dismissed twice due to lack of evidence, once in 1996 and again on January 4, 1999, but he was reindicted on October 25, 1999, charged with the murder of Dallas Grondalski. Diaz was convicted of first-degree murder on May 5, 2004, and sentenced to serve twenty-six-years to life in state prison on June 10, 2004. Three co-defendants – Mary Anne Hodgson, Sonoma County HAMC member Robert L. Huffman and Sammie Louise Lester, the wife of Gerald Lester – were convicted of conspiring to obstruct justice. Sammie Lester was sentenced to two years and eight months in state prison and fined $200 on May 27, 2004, Huffman was sentenced to one year and eight months on June 10, 2004, and Hodgson was given a three-year sentence ordered to pay $600 restitution on June 29, 2004.

== Targeting of law enforcement personnel ==
San Jose Police Department (SJPD) sergeant John Kracht survived an attempt on his life when a bomb detonated near his car on February 19, 1977. Kracht, who was in charge of all SJPD motorcycle gang investigations, had been involved in arresting numerous Hells Angels members, and he had testified against club members on several occasions. James Ezekiel "Jim-Jim" Brandes, vice-president and enforcer for the Oakland HAMC chapter, was charged with the attempted murder of Kracht as well as other crimes as part of a racketeering case against the club in June 1979. Brandes' first trial ended in a mistrial in July 1980 as did the retrial in February 1981.

Vallejo Hells Angels chapter member Kenneth Owen was charged with two felony counts after police discovered methamphetamine and prohibited firearms – a derringer, two rifles and an Ithaca sixteen-gauge shotgun – at his home, a rural property in Solano County, during a raid led by Solano County Sherriff's Office narcotics detective William O. "Bill" Zerby on June 21, 1977. On November 14, 1977, Oakland Hells Angels chapter vice-president James Patton "Sleepy Jim" Brandes was found to be in possession of a pound of methamphetamine, which was hidden behind a threshold plate in a door of his Lincoln Continental, as well as a police radio, a radio band directory, a homemade police siren, a blue flasher, a pocket-sized tape recorder, a radio transmitter and a device for detecting surveillance equipment after he was pulled over by Zerby and his partner, inspector Richard Grundy. Also among the contraband was a military handbook on booby traps and an address book containing the home address, phone number and the license-plate number of Zerby. On January 30, 1978, Zerby was seriously injured and deafened as a result of an explosive device detonated as he was entering a vehicle parked in front of his home in Vallejo. The detective was en route to court for a prehearing in the methamphetamine possession trial of Brandes at the time. Forty-two HAMC members and associates were served with grand jury subpoenas on March 27, 1978, as part of the investigation into the bombing. In or around November 1978, Brandes stated to a reporter for Rolling Stone magazine that "Zerby drew a line and stepped over it. I don't take that from anybody in the streets, and I sure ain't gonna take that from him. I don't let nobody come around and shove me around. I don't think anyone does if he's a man." The following year, Brandes and Owen were charged with the attempted murder of Zerby as part of a racketeering case against the club. The pair were ultimately acquitted of the attempted murder. In 1982, Brandes arrived in Australia with a photograph and the home address of the Victoria state policeman Bob Armstrong who was in dispute with the Angels Melbourne chapter. Brandes was deported to the United States. Brandes committed suicide by hanging himself in prison c. 1994, and Owen died July 4, 2016. Zerby, who was forced to retire from his law enforcement agency due to the injuries he sustained in the explosion, died in 2021 at the age of seventy-nine. The 1982 made-for-television film Hear No Evil was based on the incident.

Two San Diego Hells Angels chapter prospects – Robert Michael "Mexican Mike" Johnson and William Lester "Filthy Bill" Peters – were charged with conspiring to murder San Diego County District Attorney's Office Organized Crime Unit investigator Raymond C. Morgan after being arrested while conducting surveillance of Morgan's residence in Poway on February 27, 1978. An M3 submachine gun, a High Standard .22 Pistol fitted with a silencer, ammunition for both weapons, rubber gloves, camouflage clothing and a hand-drawn map to Morgan's home were found at Johnson's residence, and an electronic listening device with a parabolic microphone was found in Peters' residence after search warrants were issued. Johnson's girlfriend, Linda Sue Osborne, was also charged in the case. Morgan, who had been assigned to investigate motorcycle gang activity in the area in 1975, retired from law enforcement and fled California with his family due to intelligence reports that there was a $50,000 bounty on his head. It is believed that the San Diego Hells Angels obtained permission from the club's Oakland "mother chapter" to carry out the attempted assassination.

Four police officers were fired and another four were suspended as a result of a brawl between policemen and Hells Angels members outside the HAMC clubhouse in Oakland on April 2, 1978. The fight began after two patrolmen began issuing citations for public drunkenness to the bikers, who had gathered to attend a meeting and a birthday party, and forty-one patrol cars later converged at the scene.

Oakland police officers manning a command post during a Hells Angels member's funeral came under fire from a drive-by shooting carried by a club associate who opened fire in frustration at their presence; he fired shots, then left before returning and firing again. No casualties were reported.

== RICO case ==
Thirty-three members and associates of the Hells Angels' Oakland, San Francisco, Marin County, San Jose, Los Angeles and Vallejo chapters, including Oakland chapter president and reputed national leader Sonny Barger, were indicted on Racketeer Influenced and Corrupt Organizations (RICO) Act statutes on June 13, 1979. Twenty-one of those were arrested during large-scale raids involving approximately 200 federal agents on the day of the indictments. Ultimately, eighteen defendants stood trial as a result of dismissals and other legal maneuvers, while others remained fugitives. The prosecution team, representing the federal government, attempted to demonstrate a pattern of behavior to convict Barger and other members of the club of racketeering offenses related to guns and illegal drugs. On July 2, 1980, following an eight-month trial in which 194 witnesses testified, a mistrial was declared when a jury failed to reach a verdict on the primary counts of racketeering conspiracy against the eighteen defendants. On the remaining charges, which included drug possession and firearms offenses, six of the accused – Ronald H. Elledge, John Palomar, Alan Passaro, Manuel Rubio, Donald Smith and Bert Stefanson – were convicted, while the remaining twelve were acquitted.

On August 12, 1980, the government returned a superseding RICO indictment, which omitted the allegation that the HAMC itself constituted a criminal enterprise, against fourteen defendants – including some of those in the original case. Eleven of those stood trial. In addition to the racketeering charge, a second count of the indictment charged James Brandes with the murder of fellow Hells Angel Ray Keefauver, and the attempted murders of SJPD sergeant John Kracht and Solano County Bureau of Narcotic Enforcement inspector William Zerby. Kenneth Owen was also charged with the attempted murder of Zerby. The second RICO trial also ended in a mistrial in February 1981.

== Operation Roughrider ==
Members and associates of the Hells Angels in Sacramento, San Diego and the San Francisco Bay Area were arrested and charged with racketeering and drug trafficking on May 2, 1985, as part of Operation Roughrider, a three-year FBI investigation into the club. Six people were arrested – including San Francisco chapter president Gary Kautzman – and forty firearms were confiscated in the Bay Area. The operation, involving approximately a thousand law enforcement personnel, resulted in the arrests of a total of 133 Hells Angels members and associates during around fifty raids in eleven states, and the seizure of $2 million in cocaine, marijuana, methamphetamine, hashish, PCP and LSD, as well as weapons including Uzi submachine guns and rocket launchers. Much of the intelligence that led to the indictments was provided by Kevin P. Bonner, an undercover FBI agent who infiltrated the club for twenty-six months and made drug deals with various chapters. He purchased methamphetamine and cocaine from Kautzman on five occasions between June 4 and November 6, 1982.

== Operation One Percenter ==
On March 27, 1986, the Bureau of Alcohol, Tobacco, Firearms and Explosives (ATF), the Simi Valley Police Department, the Ventura County Sheriff's Department and the Santa Barbara County Sheriff's Department raided a home in Simi Valley, arresting six people—William T. Fisher, Ronald Griego, Richard Bauer, Michael Buchanon, Cynthia Gail Solomon, and Michael Stimtson—and seizing three silencers and parts for 20 others, a dynamite bomb, a sawed-off shotgun and four pounds of dynamite, as well as more than $100,000 worth of suspected stolen property. The raid was part of Operation One Percenter, a twelve-month investigation by the ATF which resulted in the arrests of 53 members and associates of 18 different biker gangs on various weapons and narcotics charges, during a series of raids in 18 U.S. states, and the seizure of 10 sawed-off shotguns, 10 machine guns, 63 rifles, 100 handguns, 4,500 rounds of ammunition, six silencers, a bomb, four hand grenades, five pounds of dynamite, 15 stolen vehicles, a stolen computer and a drug lab, as well as large quantities of cocaine, marijuana and PCP.

Fisher, an associate of the San Fernando Valley chapter of the Hells Angels who distributed silencers and illegally-converted automatic rifles to the Hells Angels and other motorcycle gangs for seven years, was charged with the sale and possession of illegal weapons and destructive devices, while the five others were arrested on suspicion of possession of stolen property. On July 8, 1986, Fisher pleaded guilty to one of three counts of weapons and explosives violations. He was sentenced on July 29, 1986, to five years' probation.

== Operation Cacus ==
On November 10, 1987, thirteen Hells Angels – including Sonny Barger and his second-in-command, Michael O'Farrell – were arrested on drugs, weapons, explosives and conspiracy charges during 26 raids carried out by 250 Bureau of Alcohol, Tobacco, Firearms and Explosives (ATF), Federal Bureau of Investigation (FBI) and California State Police (CSP) personnel in the San Francisco Bay Area, which also resulted in the seizure of over a hundred weapons, more than $1 million in cash and narcotics, and three methamphetamine laboratories. Approximately $1 million in cash was discovered at the Oakland home of Kenneth Owen, a club member arrested for methamphetamine distribution. The raids were the culmination of the undercover Organized Crime Drug Enforcement Task Force (OCDETF) Operation Cacus. The operation in the Bay Area was executed in synchronization with raids on various other HAMC chapters in four other states – producing a total of 38 arrests – and concluded a two-year investigation of the club, which commenced in 1985 after Anthony John Tait, the sergeant-at-arms of the Anchorage, Alaska Hells Angels chapter, volunteered to become a paid FBI informant. Travelling the country at government expense, Tait made documented purchases of weapons, explosives and drugs from the Hells Angels. He also covertly recorded club meetings by wearing a wire.

Owen was convicted of selling three pounds of methamphetamine to Tait, and was sentenced to 41 years in prison and a $2.1 million fine on September 9, 1988. Barger and O'Farrell were among ten Hells Angels from California and Alaska extradited to Louisville, Kentucky, to face trail for conspiring to transport firearms and explosives across state lines in order to kill members of the Outlaws in retaliation for the death of John Cleave Webb. Webb, the president of the Anchorage HAMC chapter, who was shot and killed by two Outlaws members outside a bar in Jefferson County, Kentucky, on August 12, 1986. Barger and O'Farrell were convicted of conspiracy on October 28, 1988. Other members of the California and Alaska chapters were convicted on state drug and firearm charges either side of the federal trial. O'Farrell was shot and stabbed to death by two men during a bar fight in San Leandro on June 6, 1989, while awaiting sentencing. Barger served three-and-a-half years of a four-year sentence at FCI Phoenix in Arizona and was released on November 6, 1992. Owen died July 4, 2016. A $1 million bounty was allegedly put on Tait's life by the Hells Angels.

== Crackdowns ==
On April 29, 2011, Ventura County Sheriff's Office gang unit detectives raided the Ventura Hells Angels chapter clubhouse during a club meeting, arresting five members on charges including being under the influence of methamphetamine, possession of marijuana for sale or possession of a deadly weapon. Among the arrested was George Christie III, the son of the Hells Angels leader George Christie Jr. The raid followed a three-week investigation into the theft of a gun safe from a home in Ojai.

A total of 26 members and associates of the Hells Angels were arrested on federal drug charges in raids by SWAT teams of the Federal Bureau of Investigation (FBI), the San Diego Police Department and the Oceanside Police Department in 19 locations across San Diego County on September 29, 2011. An additional six defendants already in custody as well as four fugitives were named in an affidavit. Thousands of dollars in currency, 10 firearms, and narcotics were also seized. The charges stemmed from a two-year investigation conducted by the FBI's Violent Crime Gang Task Force, which investigated methamphetamine trafficking and violent crimes committed by the San Diego charter of the Hells Angels.

Hells Angels member Charles Nucci was arrested when the San Francisco Police Department gang task force raided the headquarters of the Hells Angels in the Dogpatch neighborhood of San Francisco on May 14, 2014, serving a warrant in connection with an aggravated assault in 2013 in which several assailants wearing Hells Angels jackets allegedly attacked a victim in San Francisco.

On February 11, 2015, SWAT officers and Riverside County Sheriff's Department deputies raided the Hells Angels clubhouse on West 19th Street in San Bernardino, serving a gang-related warrant and arresting one member of the club. A shotgun was confiscated, as was a batch of a suspicious white powder. The raid was part of a larger operation which overall resulted in multiple arrests, and the recovery of 19 firearms, narcotics, stolen property and a stolen motorcycle, as 17 warrants were served in relation to gang violence and unsolved violent crimes.

== Bibliography ==
- Barker, Thomas (2007). Biker Gangs and Organized Crime. London: Routledge. ISBN 9780323298704.
- Christie, George (2016). Exile on Front Street: My Life as a Hells Angel. New York City: Thomas Dunne Books. ISBN 9780283072666.
- Lavigne, Yves (1996). Hell's Angels: Into the Abyss. New York City: HarperCollins. ISBN 9780006385707.
- Sher, Julian; Marsden, William (2006). Angels of Death: Inside the Bikers' Empire of Crime. Toronto: Alfred Knopf Canada. ISBN 9780307370327.
