= The Asphalt =

American rock band

- Origin: United States of America (2001)
- Genres: Rock, alternative rock, pop rock, hard rock, pop
- Labels: Novakaine Records, Citation Records
- Members: Randy Mazick, Jason Marino, Nick Turner, Clifford Hickle
- Past members: Jon Stutler (Bass), Sam Savage (Drums), John "Snake" Wilhelm (Guitar), Josh "Ralphie" Schneider (Guitar, Casey Wilson (Guitar)

The Asphalt is an American rock band formed in 2001 in Lake Havasu City, Arizona. The band was founded by Randy Mazick and currently consists of Randy Mazick (vocals, guitars), Jason Marino (guitars), Clifford Hickle (bass) and Nick Turner (drums).

== Background ==
The band have released five studio albums to date. The latest album, Learning to Forget, was released on the independent record label Novakaine Records on April 20, 2010. The album's first single "Where The Past Begins" is featured on the soundtrack for the upcoming Lionsgate/Grindhouse movie "Beatdown," on DVD and Blu-ray disc August 31, 2010. The CD was released with an accompanying DVD in a double-disc set. The DVD features interviews and commentary, a digital version of the album, and multiple live and broadcast quality music videos, one of which is for "Where The Past Begins." The video, filmed in and around Kingman, Arizona on December 10, 2009, was directed by local filmmaker Troy Higgins with Crunch Films and guitarist Jason Marino. The video was edited by Jonathan Hayward, a production coordinator with the Arizona Cardinals NFL team.

In spring 2013 the band announced the start of tracking on yet another studio album, this time being recorded at the private studios of Grammy Award-winning producer and engineer Jeremy Parker, with vocal production assisted by Kris Roe of veteran rock band The Ataris. Rumors have placed Stephen Egerton of The Descendents and All fame as mixing the album.

As of October 2010, Jon Stutler has been replaced by Clifford Hickle as bassist for the band. It is believed Stutler wanted to spend more time with his new family and concentrate on his wood-working career.

== TV show pilot ==
The band wrote, produced and directed a pilot for a television show in January 2010. The show, entitled "Outside The Box: With The Asphalt" is based around the combining of the Food Network show "Diners, Drive-Ins and Dives" with Guy Fieri, and the movie Almost Famous. The band filmed the pilot episode in Wikieup, Arizona at Eat At Joe's BBQ.

The band were seen with a film crew in Anaheim, California in January at NAMM Show 2011 apparently filming segments for future episodes of Outside The Box. The band and film crew were spotted later that weekend at the restaurant Tinga, in Los Angeles, California. The band were at the restaurant for several hours filming yet another segment for the TV show.

== Notable Appearances ==
The Asphalt have played at South by Southwest in both 2006 and 2007. The band performed at Edgefest 2007 in Queen Creek, Arizona for a crowd of over 14,000 with bands Social Distortion, Bad Religion, Flyleaf, The Bravery, Authority Zero, and many more. The band opened for Bad Company in a somewhat strange booking during Laughlin River Run 2008, played alongside another interesting pairing in The Doobie Brothers at the Tempe Insight Fiesta Bowl Block Party on New Year's Eve 2009, and opened the main stage for rock superstars Jimmy Eat World at the same New Year's Eve event in 2010.

== Disputes and lawsuits ==
The band were famously involved in a plagiarism dispute in 2008 after creating and posting a video on youtube.com comparing their single "Tonight" with the single "Feels Like Tonight" performed by Daughtry and written by Dr. Luke and, suggesting that the chorus of "Tonight" was substantially similar to that of "Feels Like Tonight." The video went viral after being picked up by aol.com, VH1, Perez Hilton, Adam Carolla Show, and dozens more websites and broadcasts, resulting in over 250,000 views in 72 hours. The fallout from the video resulted in plagiarism lawsuits being filed by both parties in federal court in both New York City and Arizona. The disputes were ultimately resolved outside of court and the pending lawsuits were then dropped by both parties.
