= River Run riot =

Organized crime conflict in Laughlin, Nevada

Date	April 27, 2002
Location	Laughlin, Nevada

Belligerents
Hells Angels	Mongols

Commanders and leaders
Sonny Barger; George Christie	Ruben "Doc" Cavazos

Casualties and losses
2 killed Many injured 7 imprisoned	1 killed Many injured 6 imprisoned

The River Run riot was a violent confrontation between the Hells Angels and Mongols motorcycle clubs that occurred on April 27, 2002, in Laughlin, Nevada during the Laughlin River Run.

== Background ==
Laughlin is a town just 80 miles south of Las Vegas that in 2002 had 9 casinos and 8,000 people. Every April about 100,000 people arrive in Laughlin for the River Run. Amongst the bikers who arrived in Laughlin were the members of the Hells Angels and Mongols.

The Mongols were the only outlaw biker gang allowed to wear California on their patches after winning a biker war with the Hells Angels over the issue in the 1970s-1980s, which caused much ill-will. The Mongols were 90% Hispanic while the Hells Angels were all white. The Mongols tended to be younger and many did not know how to ride motorcycles while the Hells Angels tended to be middle-aged and usually did know to ride motorcycles. The Mongols had been expanding in southern California. In 2002, the Mongols had 39 chapters in southern California vs. 5 Hells Angels chapters in southern California. On April 25, 2002, Sonny Barger, the Hells Angel leader arrived in Laughlin for the River Run. The Hells Angels stayed at the Flamingo Hilton while the Mongols stayed at Harrah's.

== Prelude to the brawl ==
At the Flamingo Hilton casino, a group of Mongols stormed in to stare at the Hells Angels. John Ciccone, an agent with the Bureau of Alcohol, Tobacco, Firearms and Explosives who was present told the Canadian journalists Julian Sher and William Marsden: "They [the Mongols] just stood there and eye-fucked everybody. The HAs didn't do anything. And every time the HAs didn't respond, that made the Mongols in everybody's eyes look like they were the "badder" group. And the Hells Angels were just biting their lips because they were trying to keep this clean image". The Las Vegas police normally had 5 to 7 officers to monitor the River Run, but in 2002 owing to budget cutbacks the Vegas police had only 2 officers assigned to the River Run. Detective Tom Allen of the Vegas police told Sher and Marsden: "It was basically useless; we caught a lot of stuff, but we missed a lot of stuff".

At about 9:30 pm on April 26, 2002, a group of Mongols went into the Golden Nugget casino to surround a Hells Angel motorcycle on display in the front lobby to prevent anyone from seeing it. At about 11:30 pm, the Mongols finally left the Golden Nugget to return to Harrah's. A Mongol leader promised a police officer that there would be no more trouble that night. Another police officer visited the Flamingo Hilton to ask the Angels for restraint, and received the reply: "We have chosen a life of outlaws; we plan to live the life of outlaws. We don't need the police department...We don't care what the fuck you do, we're going to do what we have to do to protect ourselves".

At the Harrah's Laughlin casino hotel, a group of Hells Angels arrived. A Mongol deliberately bumped into a Hells Angel. A witness later stated: "You could just see daggers coming out of this guy's eyes. They were restless, they were uneasy, they were on edge". Jay Buhr, a blackjack dealer remembered the exchange shortly after 2 am where a Hells Angel said: "We don't want to start this in here. Let's take it outside". Buhr picked up the telephone to call his manager: "We don't have enough security for what's going to happen".

== The fight ==
The Hells Angels at Harrah's used their cell phones to ask for help from the other Angels still at Hilton. According to witnesses, David "Monty" Elliot of the Anchorage chapter told the other Angels "what choice do we have?" while another shouted "let's mount up!" The Hells Angels rode over to Harrah's. Gary Hood of the Vegas police recalled: "they jumped off their bikes in this area and ran into the entrance". A guest, Jeffery King, who had just arrived in the front lobby to check in was told by the Angels who stormed in: "Better get the fuck out of here because trouble is about to start!" Leading the Angels were Raymond "Ray Ray" Foakes, the sergeant-at-arms of the Sonoma County chapter. Sher and Marsden wrote: "The Angels acted with military precision, a small group acting as sentries around the bar".

At about 2:16 AM, the security cameras recorded that Foakes kicked a Mongol in the chest, which started the brawl. The Mongols and the Hells Angels fought with guns, wrenches, hammers and knives. A tourist, Kerry Richard, recorded the shots that rang out as: "Boom! Boom! Pop! Pop!" Richard saw a man bleeding from a gunshot wound trying to push his bikers vest with the Mongol patch behind the slot machines. Richard recalled: "Then it dawned on me that he wasn't a regular patron like myself, he was a Mongol and he was trying to hide his colors". Another tourist, John Davidson, took cover under the gambling table along with his chips worth $1,200 and had to pull down the blackjack dealer whom he stated: "She was screaming out of control". A blackjack dealer who had taken cover under the roulette wheel called her husband on her cell phone to ask if he was safe. The husband, who worked as a bartender, had taken cover under the bar and asked his wife in return if she was safe. She replied that she was, but that she had a corpse right next to her. Sher and Marsden wrote: "With little regard for innocent bystanders, the bikers went at each other like Vikings on a battlefield-and it was all captured on more than four hundred surveillance tapes". A Hells Angel, Cal Schaefer, was recorded by the cameras swinging a ball-peen hammer at two Mongols, to be followed by pulling out his handgun and firing several shots. Schaefer shot a Mongol, Richard Nolan, who had to be hospitalized.

After a Hells Angel emptied a round from his handgun and was in the process of reloading, Buhr shouted at him: "Hey buddy, get out of the pit because if somebody starts to shoot at you, all of the rest of us are in danger! You're using us as a shield basically!" At another blackjack table, a wounded Hells Angel was dragged over to be treated. A Hells Angel, Rodney Cox, who was armed with a crescent wrench, told everyone else taking over: "This is my area. I'm protecting my friend here-go away!" When a Mongol approached, the blackjack dealer, William Southern, recalled: "He literally jumped up, ran after him, buried it [the wrench] in his head, and then turned around and ran back to watch his friend again".

The leader of the Mongols at Harrah's, Roger Pinney, was surrounded by two Hells Angels who forced him to his knees while the Hells Angel Henry Leedom punched him in the face. The other Hells Angel, James Hannigan, grappled Pinney by his long hair with his right hand and stabbed in the chest twice with his left hand. Hannigan then approached a Mongol, Benjamin Leyva, who was fighting another Hells Angel. Hannigan plunged his knife into Leyva's left shoulder. As Leyva stumbled away in pain, he was shot by Schaefer. Levya took bullets to his elbow, back and stomach. The security cameras recorded the Mongol Enrique Muñoz staggering out from the casino bleeding from a bullet wound in his chest. Joining him were his fellow Mongols Davey Carmargo who had a bullet wound in his leg and Anthony Salvador Barrera who had been stabbed in the chest. An eyewitness testified before the grand jury: "Every door out of the place had blood trails".

A Mongol, Anthony Barrera, 43, was stabbed to death, and two Hells Angels, Jeramie Bell, 27, and Robert Tumelty, 50, were shot to death. This was the first time that there were multiple murders in a Nevada casino. The brawl was seen as a victory for the Hells Angels. Sher and Marsden wrote: "And while the Mongols fled, stuffing their vests in garbage cans and air vents to avoid being identified by the police after the battle, not a single Hells Angel took off his colours".

== Aftermath ==
The first officer to arrive was Gary Hood who radioed for help. One of the Las Vegas police officers, Michael Ford, drew his gun and confronted Hannigan. Ford ordered Hannigan to drop his knife or be shot down. When Hannigan ignored him, Ford shouted: "Either do it or you're going to be killed. I'm going to kill you!" Hannigan finally dropped his knife and raised his hands in surrender. The police found 14 guns, 107 knives, 2 hammers, 2 wrenches and 9 flashlights abandoned on the floor of the casino. The informant Michael Kramer recorded the Hells Angels West Coast Officers Meeting on May 18, 2002 in the clubhouse of the San Bernardino chapter. Robert "Bad Bob" Johnson, the president of the Mesa chapter was recorded as saying that the Hells Angels should leak video copies of the riot to let the American people "understand the honor and integrity of the Hells Angels" who had held their ground, did not retreat and were still wearing their colors.

The prosecution of those responsible went nowhere, largely because of in-fighting between the Nevada attorney-general and the United States attorney-general. By the time of the first anniversary of the riot in April 2003, no charges had been filed against anyone involved in the riot. The attorney-general of Nevada wanted to prosecute the Hells Angels and Mongols as individuals while the federal government wanted to indict the Hells Angels and Mongols as criminal organizations under the Violent Crimes in Aid of Racketeering Activity act, which required proof that a person committed a violent crime in the service of a criminal organization. There was little co-operation between Nevada and the federal government. A policeman who did not wished to be named told Sher and Marsden: "The U.S. district attorney was having problems with the state DA. Plus, the homicide detectives with Las Vegas police were protecting what they had had, and you had an ATF office where no one had worked big cases and knew what direction to take it in". At the request of Thomas Allen, a detective with the Las Vegas police, the investigation of the riot was handed over to John Ciccone of the Bureau of Alcohol, Tobacco, Firearms and Explosives who often handled biker-related cases. It was after Ciccone took charge that the investigation acquired momentum. On December 3, 2003, the ATF arrested 51 Hells Angels with 49 facing violence-related and racketeering charges. The Supreme Court of Nevada sided with motions by the lawyers for the Hells Angels that there were "major flaws" in the federal indictments under the Violent Crimes in Aid of Racketeering Activity act, and dismissed the charges.

In 2005, Barger was interviewed by Sher and Marsden where he said about the River Run riot: "'Really, that's what it was, a barroom fight. Cops made it happen. They infiltrated the other side. They tried to infiltrate against us. They got into the other club. They agitated them. They agitated us. They were there when it happened. They claimed they knew it was going to happen".

Seven Hells Angels and six Mongols were imprisoned as a result of the event, and 36 other people had their charges dismissed. Frederick Donahue, one of the Hells Angels indicted after the incident, evaded capture for six years before surrendering in July 2008.

== Books ==
- Sher, Julian; Marsden, William (2006). Angels of Death: Inside the Bikers' Empire of Crime. Toronto: Alfred Knopf Canada. ISBN 9780307370327.
