= Harrah's Laughlin =

Casino hotel in Nevada, United States

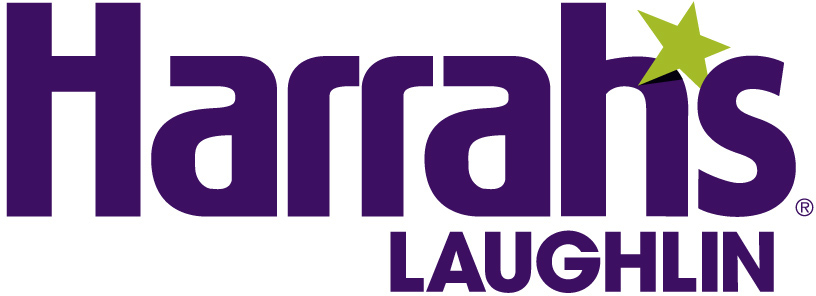

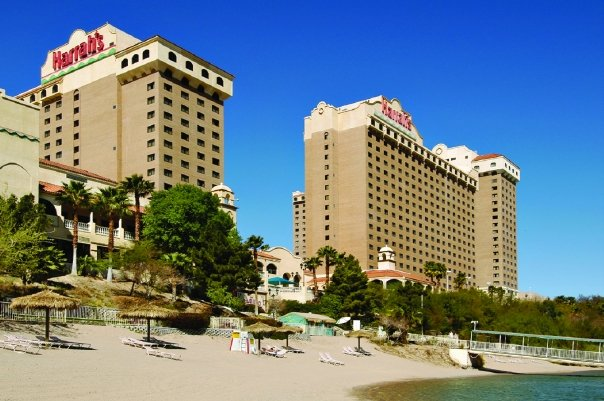
- Harrah's Laughlin in 2013
- Interactive map of Harrah's Laughlin
- Location: Laughlin, Nevada, U.S.; 2900 South Casino Drive; 35.144478°N 114.577065°W
- Opened: August 29, 1988; 37 years ago
- Theme: Mexican Riviera and Pavilion
- No. of rooms: 1,505
- Gaming space: 56,357 sq ft (5,235.7 m^{2})
- Notable restaurants: Beach Café; Cinnabon; Fresh Market Square Buffet (until 2020); Guy Fieri's El Burro Borracho; Pin-Up Pizza; Smashburger; Starbucks; The Range Steakhouse
- Casino type: Land-based
- Owner: Vici Properties
- Operating license holder: Caesars Entertainment
- Previous names: Harrah's Del Rio
- Website: caesars.com/harrahs-laughlin

Harrah's Laughlin (formerly Harrah's Del Rio) is a casino hotel on the banks of the Colorado River in Laughlin, Nevada. It has 1,505 rooms, including 115 suites, as well as a 56,357 sq ft (5,235.7 m^{2}) casino. There are several restaurants, a poker room, keno and a race and sports book. It is owned by Vici Properties and operated by Caesars Entertainment.

== History ==
It was opened on August 29, 1988 with the 15-story South Tower and the 18-story Central Tower making up the hotel. In 1992, construction of the 20-story North Tower was completed. The South Tower operates as an adult-only facility and the North and Central Towers serve as family towers of the hotel.

Harrah's Laughlin was the site of the River Run riot, a fight between the Hells Angels and the Mongols during the annual Laughlin River Run. 3 people were killed during the fighting.

In July 2020, Eldorado Resorts acquired Caesars Entertainment, taking over operations of the property. In connection with that acquisition, Vici Properties bought the real estate of Harrah's Laughlin for $435 million and leased it back to Eldorado (newly renamed as Caesars Entertainment).
