= Ruben Cavazos =

American criminal (born 1956)

- Born: December 28, 1956 (age 69); Los Angeles, California, U.S.
- Other name: Doc
- Occupations: Criminal, writer
- Organization: Mongols Motorcycle Club
- Known for: Former President of Mongols Motorcycle Club
- Status: No longer incarcerated
- Criminal charges: Racketeering
- Penalty: 14 years' imprisonment

Ruben Cavazos (born December 28, 1956) is an American criminal, and former International President of the Mongols Motorcycle Club. His autobiography, Honor Few, Fear None: The Life & Times of a Mongol, was published by HarperCollins in 2008.

Cavazos was raised by his father in Highland Park, Los Angeles, California and joined the Avenues, a Mexican American street gang, at an early age before serving time in county jail. He has a license to work as a radiology technician, hence the nickname "Doc". He later became a member of the Mongols and is one of the gang's most infamous members. He has been blamed for turning the club into one of the largest criminal organizations on the West Coast of the United States during his time as President. In order to bolster the club's ranks, he also recruited members of street gangs into the club, much to the disgust of the old school bikers. He was voted out of the club on August 30, 2008, during a meeting in Vernon, California, due to the membership believing that he was stealing from the club and provoking a war with the Mexican Mafia.

On October 21, 2008, Cavazos and 37 other Mongols were arrested by the Bureau of Alcohol, Tobacco, Firearms and Explosives after an investigation into the club, known as Operation Black Rain. Police raided his 2,760-square-foot (256 m^{2}) home in South Hills, West Covina, California, where he lived with his son, Ruben "Lil Rubes" Cavazos Jr, and brother, Al "the Suit" Cavazos, and seized firearms and bulletproof vests. After his arrest during the Operation Black Rain, he pleaded guilty to racketeering charges. He has been sentenced to 14 years in prison.
