= Laughlin River Run =

Annual motorcycle rally held in Laughlin, Nevada

Coordinates: 35.1417°N 114.6186°W

- Genre: Motorcycle rally
- Dates: Last weekend in April
- Locations: Laughlin, Nevada, U.S.
- Founded: 1983
- Previous event: April 25–29, 2019
- Next event: TBA, deferred from 2020
- Attendance: 70,000 (2005)
- Website: laughlinriverrun.com

Laughlin River Run was an annual motorcycle rally held in Laughlin, Nevada. It was the largest gathering of bikes and bikers in the Western United States. The event drew an estimated 70,000 motorcycle enthusiasts in 2005.

== History ==
The river run was started in 1983 with 426 participants. It was "conceived by Harley-Davidson dealer Dale Marschke, who wanted to bring his customers on a fun weekend ride." The name comes from the fact that riders are riding out to the Colorado River, on which Laughlin sits. Other riders go across the river to Laughlin's sister city, Bullhead City, Arizona, Route 66 rides to Oatman, Arizona and Kingman, Arizona, and also down to Lake Havasu City, Arizona.

The event featured several attractions and events, including live concerts, many motorcycle vendors, a poker run, drag races, a bike show, Ms. Laughlin competition, and charity events.

Accommodations are usually made at the various large hotels in Laughlin; however, in recent years, campsites have also been utilized for RVs.

The 2002 rally was marred by the River Run Riot, a major brawl between rival motorcycle clubs (Hells Angels and Mongols) at Harrah's Laughlin that left three bikers dead, another 13 injured, and 9 bikers arrested.

The Laughlin Nevada Times reported on January 14, 2020, that the promoter for the 2020 event has not responded to inquiries and its website appears to have been abandoned, and that the Laughlin Chamber of Commerce has removed the event from their calendars. Since that year, the COVID-19 pandemic caused the river run to go on hiatus.
