= Bionicle (film series) =

Films based on the Lego toyline with the same name

Bionicle films
- The logo variant used for the last entry in the series, Bionicle: The Legend Reborn (2009)
- Directed by: Terry Shakespeare David Molina (2003–2005); Mark Baldo (2009)
- Based on: Bionicle by The Lego Group
- Music by: Nathan Furst (2003–2005); John D'Andrea (2009)
- Distributed by: Buena Vista Home Entertainment (Note: Under the Miramax Home Entertainment label.) (2003–2005); Universal Studios Home Entertainment (2009)
- Countries: Denmark; United States
- Language: English
- Budget: $8.5 million – $10 million (first two films only)

Bionicle is a series of direct-to-video animated science fantasy action films based on the Lego toyline of the same name.

In total, four films have been released. The first three from Miramax serve as a trilogy, while Universal's Bionicle: The Legend Reborn is a stand-alone, originally intended to be the start of a new saga of films in the series, but following the discontinuation of the Bionicle brand in 2010, the sequels were ultimately scrapped.

== Films ==
| Film | U.S. release date | Director | Screenwriter(s) | Producer(s) |
Original trilogy
| Bionicle: Mask of Light | September 16, 2003 | Terry Shakespeare and David Molina | Alastair Swinnerton, Henry Gilroy and Greg Weisman | Sue Shakespeare, Janice Ross and Stig Blicher |
| Bionicle 2: Legends of Metru Nui | October 19, 2004 | Terry Shakespeare and David Molina | Henry Gilroy, Greg Klein, Tom Pugsley and Elliot Gabrel | Sue Shakespeare |
| Bionicle 3: Web of Shadows | October 11, 2005 | Terry Shakespeare and David Molina | Brett Matthews | Sue Shakespeare and Bob Thompson |
Stand-alone film
| Bionicle: The Legend Reborn | September 15, 2009 | Mark Baldo | Sean Catherine Derek and Greg Farshtey (story) | Kristy Scanlan and Joshua Wexler |

=== Original trilogy ===
==== Bionicle: Mask of Light (2003) ====
The first film began production in 2002, with production being completed in 13 months. The film was co-directed by Terry Shakespeare and David Molina of Creative Capers Entertainment with Bionicle co-creator Alastair Swinnerton, Henry Gilroy and Greg Weisman serving as writers. Sue Shakespeare, Janice Ross and Stig Blicher served as producers. It was the only film in the series to be written by Greg Weisman, who was fired during production for "yawning".

==== Bionicle 2: Legends of Metru Nui (2004) ====
Originally intended for a theatrical release, production on the second film was completed in 12 months, one month shorter than the first feature. The film was co-directed by Terry Shakespeare and David Molina of Creative Capers Entertainment with Henry Gilroy, Greg Klein, Tom Pugsley and Elliot Gabrel serving as screenwriters, with a story by Bob Thompson and Henry Gilroy. Sue Shakespeare served as producer.

==== Bionicle 3: Web of Shadows (2005) ====
Also originally intended for a theatrical release, the film was co-directed by Terry Shakespeare and David Molina of Creative Capers Entertainment with Brett Matthews serving as screenwriter, with a story by Bob Thompson, Henry Gilroy and Greg Farshtey. Sue Shakespeare and Bob Thompson served as producers.

=== Stand-alone film ===
==== Bionicle: The Legend Reborn (2009) ====
The film was directed by Mark Baldo with Sean Catherine Derek serving as writer, with a story by Greg Farshtey. Kristy Scanlan and Joshua Wexler served as producers.

== Music ==
The first three films were composed by Nathan Furst, while John D'Andrea composed the fourth film. Mask of Light, Legends of Metru Nui and Web of Shadows had their soundtracks released on March 10, December 12, and December 22, 2017, respectively by Rising Phoenix Records, although The Legend Reborn's soundtrack has yet to be released.

== Characters ==
- A dark grey cell indicates the character did not appear in that film.
- A ^{M} indicates a character in the form of a Matoran.
- A ^{T} indicates a character in the form of a Toa.
- A ^{Tu} indicates a character in the form of a Turaga.

| Character | Original trilogy | | | Stand-alone film |
| Character | Bionicle: Mask of Light | Bionicle 2: Legends of Metru Nui | Bionicle 3: Web of Shadows | Bionicle: The Legend Reborn |
Primary cast
| Jaller | Andrew Francis^{M} | Appeared | Appeared | |
| Takua/Takanuva | Jason Michas^{M} ^{T} | Appeared | Appeared | |
| Tahu | Scott McNeil^{T} | | | |
| Vakama | Christopher Gaze^{Tu} | Alessandro Juliani^{M} ^{T} Christopher Gaze^{Tu} | Alessandro Juliani^{M} ^{T} Christopher Gaze^{Tu} | |
| Onewa | Dale Wilson^{Tu} | Brian Drummond^{M} ^{T} | Brian Drummond^{M} ^{T} | |
| Nokama | Lesley Ewen^{Tu} | Tabitha St. Germain^{M} ^{T} | Tabitha St. Germain^{M} ^{T} | |
| Gali | Kathleen Barr | | | |
| Pohatu | Trevor Devall | | | |
| Hahli | Chiara Zanni | Appeared | Appeared | |
| Makuta | Lee Tockar | Lee Tockar | Appeared | |
| Lewa | Dale Wilson | | | |
| Kopaka | Michael Dobson | | | |
| Onua | Scott McNeil | | | |
| Matau | Appeared^{Tu} | Brian Drummond^{M} ^{T} | Brian Drummond^{M} ^{T} | |
| Whenua | Appeared^{Tu} | Paul Dobson^{M} | Paul Dobson^{M} | |
| Nuju | Appeared^{Tu} | Trevor Devall^{Y} | Trevor Devall^{Y} | |
| Lhikan | | Michael Dobson^{T} | | |
| Krekka | | Michael Dobson | | |
| Nidhiki | | Paul Dobson | | |
| Dume | | Gerard Plunkett | | |
| Sidorak | | | Paul Dobson | |
| Roodaka | | | Kathleen Barr | |
| Norik | | | French Tickner | |
| Keetongu | | | Scott McNeil | |
| Mata Nui | | | | Michael Dorn |
| Metus | | | | David Leisure |
| Raanu | | | | Armin Shimerman |
| Strakk | | | | Jeff Bennett |
| Ackar | | | | Jim Cummings |
| Kiina | | | | Marla Sokoloff |
| Tuma | | | | Fred Tatasciore |
| Gresh | | | | Mark Famiglietti |
| Berix | | | | James Arnold Taylor |
| Vastus | | | | James Arnold Taylor |
| Tarix | | | | Jeff Bennett |
Supporting cast
| Kolhii Announcer | Doc Harris | | | |
| Hewkii | Michael Dobson | | | |
| Rahkshi | Julian B. Wilson | | | |
| Ta-Matoran Guard | Julian B. Wilson | | | |
| Kongu | | Lee Tockar | | |
| Bomonga | | | Scott McNeil | |
| Gaaki | | | Kathleen Barr | |
| Iruini | | | Trevor Devall | |
| Vorox | | | | Dee Bradley Baker |
| Bone Hunters | | | | Dee Bradley Baker |
| Skrall | | | | Dee Bradley Baker |
| Villagers | | | | Mark Baldo |

== Release ==
The first film, Bionicle: Mask of Light, had its world premiere at Legoland in Carlsbad, California on September 13, 2003, and was released in the United States three days after the premiere, on VHS and DVD by Buena Vista Home Entertainment under the Miramax Home Entertainment label.

The second film, Bionicle 2: Legends of Metru Nui, had its world premiere at the El Capitan Theatre in Hollywood, Los Angeles, California on October 6, 2004, and was released in the United States on October 19, on VHS and DVD by Buena Vista Home Entertainment under the Miramax Home Entertainment label.

The third film, Bionicle 3: Web of Shadows, was released in the United States on October 11, 2005, on DVD by Buena Vista Home Entertainment under the Miramax Home Entertainment label.

A fourth stand-alone film, Bionicle: The Legend Reborn, had its world premiere at Legoland in Carlsbad, California on August 29, 2009, and was released in the United States on September 15, on DVD by Universal Studios Home Entertainment.

== Promotion ==
Cartoon Network's anime block, Toonami, hosted a sweepstakes contest for the television premiere of the first film, Bionicle: Mask of Light. Viewers could call-in the channel's number to have a chance to win prizes that included miscellaneous Bionicle sets, one Magnavox 36” TV, one Magnavox Progressive Scan DVD player, as well as the addition of one lucky winner receiving a Platinum Avohkii mask. For the film, fast food chain Burger King also released a set of Kids Meal toys in the United Kingdom. Later, Cartoon Network would host another sweepstakes contest on the Miguzi block, for the television premiere of the third film, Bionicle 3: Web of Shadows, where viewers could yet again call-in the channel's number and have the chance to win miscellaneous Bionicle sets as well as one lucky winner receiving a life-size Visorak Keelerak statue made out of Lego pieces. Scholastic, one of the biggest publishing corporations in the world, also released books made to tie-in with the films from the original trilogy.

== Reception ==
=== Critical response ===
The first installment, Bionicle: Mask of Light, received generally positive reviews from journalists upon its release, but in retrospect, has been criticized for its dated visuals. Matthew Attanasio of Comic Book Resources noted that the animation held up but stating for character animations that they are "hit or miss". He also said that the story was "pretty straightforward" while also stating that Takua and Jaller made "great protagonists", but was disappointed to see the Toa, mainly Onua, have little screen time.

The second installment, Bionicle 2: Legends of Metru Nui, received mixed reviews from journalists upon its initial release, but in retrospect, has been viewed more favorably compared to its predecessor, with it being praised for its upgrade in animation, but was criticized for its filling in of plot holes from the first film. Matthew Attanasio of Comic Book Resources gave a negative review of the film, stating that "LEGO's decision to focus on prequel material was received as a slap in the face". He added that the positive aspects of the film included its animation, but also criticized the editing, saying that like the past film, "maintains the problem of poor editing to the point of being laughably bad".

=== Accolades ===
| Year | Award | Nominated work | Result |
|---|---|---|---|
| 2003 | Golden Reel Award for Best Visual Effects in a DVD Premiere Movie in December 2003 | Bionicle: Mask of Light | Won |
| 2004 | Saturn Award for Best DVD Release | Bionicle: Mask of Light | Won |
| 2004 | DVD Exclusive Award for Best Animated Premiere Movie | Bionicle 2: Legends of Metru Nui | Nominated |
| 2004 | DVD Exclusive Award for Best Director | Bionicle 2: Legends of Metru Nui | Nominated |
| 2004 | DVD Exclusive Award for Best Original Score | Bionicle 2: Legends of Metru Nui | Nominated |
| 2004 | Saturn Award for Best DVD Release | Bionicle 2: Legends of Metru Nui | Nominated |
| 2004 | iParenting Media Award for Best Home Video/DVD | Bionicle 2: Legends of Metru Nui | Won |
| 2004 | Golden Reel Award for Sound Editing in a Direct to Video Release | Bionicle 2: Legends of Metru Nui | Won |
| 2005 | Golden Reel Award for Sound Editing in a Direct to Video Release | Bionicle 3: Web of Shadows | Nominated |
| 2005 | Annie Award for Best Home Entertainment Production | Bionicle 3: Web of Shadows | Nominated |
