= Music of the Bionicle film series =

The music of the animated direct-to-video feature films based on the Bionicle toy line by Lego was composed by Nathan Furst and John D'Andrea. Furst composed the scores for the first three films released by Miramax & Buena Vista Home Entertainment – Bionicle: Mask of Light (2003), Bionicle 2: Legends of Metru Nui (2004), and Bionicle 3: Web of Shadows (2005) – while D'Andrea composed the music for the fourth film, Bionicle: The Legend Reborn (2009), which was released by Universal Studios.

Though the soundtracks were initially unavailable for purchase, the original scores for the first three films were released as digital albums in 2017 (over a decade after the film releases) through the label Rising Phoenix Records. There has been no official release of the fourth film's music and there are currently no known plans for one.

Aside from Cryoshell's debut album (which includes some songs originally composed to promote the toy line), the Bionicle score soundtracks are the only full-length albums of Bionicle-related music that have been commercially released.

== Composition ==
Nathan Furst's preferred musical style of grand orchestra and electronica was what the producers of Mask of Light were looking for in a composer. During the film's production, Furst was approached by sound supervisor Tim Borquez, who facilitated communication between Furst and producer Sue Shakespeare about a potential job as composer. Furst was subsequently hired after presenting a track that the filmmakers reacted favorably to.

Furst was initially unaware of the Bionicle toy line and started reading about the universe on the official website before beginning the composition process. When writing the music, he worked mainly off of scene concepts and discussions with the crew regarding the tones they were aiming for, and was given extensive creative freedom by the filmmakers on what he could write. The first film's score combines an overall grand orchestral style with tribal and ethnic elements, taking inspiration from African, Polynesian, and Eastern European styles of music to emphasize the film's island-based setting.

For the second film, Furst integrated electronic and techno sounds to accommodate the futuristic style, while the third film's music relies more on standard orchestral elements.

As The Legend Reborn was produced by a different crew than the original trilogy, Furst was not asked to return to score the film and the job went to John D'Andrea instead. Furst attributed this decision to the studio's desire to not retread old ground. Furst's music was, however, used as inspiration for the fourth film's score.

== History ==
The reason for the delayed release of the film scores is not fully clear. Nathan Furst went back and forth regarding the possibility of soundtrack releases for several years, at one point announcing plans for an album containing re-recorded themes from the trilogy (a project he later revealed was scrapped) and at another point stating that most of the score would not be released for a number of undisclosed reasons. Furst also said that he was unable to locate the scores in his archives and that the Legends of Metru Nui score had been lost in a hard drive crash for years, though he later revealed that it was eventually recovered.

Prior to the 2017 releases of the soundtracks, only a few pieces of stand-alone music from the films were available. A number of excerpts from the second and third films' scores were available for streaming on Nathan Furst's website (now only accessible through a web archive), and Furst himself occasionally uploaded complete tracks to SoundCloud and YouTube.

To date, there has been no release and no known plans for a release of the score from The Legend Reborn.

== Albums ==
The soundtrack albums for the first three films are available in digital music stores such as iTunes, Amazon, and Google Play. They collectively contain almost all of the original music from the trilogy. Furst has stated that there are currently no plans for physical releases due to the lack of demand for physical media.

While the original tracks are largely identical to their in-film counterparts, several of them do contain differences, particularly in the second and third soundtracks. For example, the electronic elements and drum beats in some cues from Legends of Metru Nui are slightly de-emphasized, while those in other cues are absent. Several tracks from Web of Shadows also omit certain musical sounds that are present in the film variations.

=== Mask of Light ===
Bionicle: Mask of Light - Original Score Soundtrack (14th Anniversary Release)

Film score by Nathan Furst
- Released: March 10, 2017
- Genre: Soundtrack
- Length: 1:06:27
- Label: Rising Phoenix Records

Nathan Furst chronology
Need for Speed (2014)	Bionicle: Mask of Light - Original Score Soundtrack (14th Anniversary Release) (2017)	Bionicle 2: Legends of Metru Nui - Original Score Soundtrack (2017)

The Mask of Light soundtrack was released on March 10, 2017, fourteen years after the film's release, containing the complete score from the film. Unlike the other two soundtracks, the Mask of Light release is labeled as a "14th Anniversary" edition for unknown reasons.

The soundtrack does not include the drums played during the Kolhii tournament announcer's introduction of the teams or the drums of Le-Koro that Lewa observes in a later scene, which is likely because they were both intended as sound effects within the film's plot and not meant for an isolated listening experience. However, the drums from the Kolhii tournament can be heard during the film's end credits.

==== Track listing ====
No.	Title	Length
1.	"Legend of the Bionicle"	4:08
2.	"A Great Kanohi Mask"	3:01
3.	"Our New Koli Field"	1:57
4.	"Koli Tournament"	2:10
5.	"Prophecy of a 7th Toa"	3:12
6.	"Gali's Meditation & Birth of the Rahkshi"	1:47
7.	"Trust in the Mask"	1:42
8.	"The Fall of Ta-Koro"	7:00
9.	"Toa Lewa Helps"	5:09
10.	"You Were Following Me"	1:46
11.	"Rahkshi Washed and Chilled"	2:51
12.	"Shadows Are Everywhere"	4:13
13.	"Destruction of Onu-Koro"	4:59
14.	"Healing Tahu"	2:41
15.	"Toa Reunited and Death of Jaller"	5:32
16.	"A New Hero"	2:12
17.	"A Simple Game of Koli"	5:45
18.	"Unity, Duty, Destiny"	6:22
Total length:		66:27

=== Legends of Metru Nui ===
Bionicle 2: Legends of Metru Nui - Original Score Soundtrack

Film score by Nathan Furst
- Released: December 12, 2017
- Genre: Soundtrack
- Length: 57:27
- Label: Rising Phoenix Records

Nathan Furst chronology
Bionicle: Mask of Light - Original Score Soundtrack (14th Anniversary Release) (2017)	Bionicle 2: Legends of Metru Nui - Original Score Soundtrack (2017)	Bionicle 3: Web of Shadows - Original Score Soundtrack (2017)

The Legends of Metru Nui soundtrack was released on December 12, 2017, thirteen years after the film's release. It contains most of the music from the film, with music from a handful of scenes being omitted. One of these cues, however, is among those available on Furst's archived website. Some tracks contain sections of music that were apparently silenced in the film itself, most notably "Escaping Dark Hunters" and "Lhikan's Death / Vakama's Power Found".

The soundtrack contains two bonus tracks. The first is an alternate "Desert/Kikeinalo" theme that was unused in the film, while the second is Furst's original sketch for Lhikan's theme that was used partially in the film's DVD menu.

==== Track listing ====
No.	Title	Length
1.	"Legend of Metru Nui / Toa Stones"	5:33
2.	"Lhikan's Capture / Vakama's Vision"	2:46
3.	"Dume's Request"	1:03
4.	"Faithful Matoran to Mighty Toa"	4:13
5.	"Arena Challenge"	3:26
6.	"Vahki Attack!"	1:36
7.	"Escaping Dark Hunters"	2:02
8.	"Bad Things Happen in the Desert"	5:05
9.	"Mask Powers / Herd of Vahki"	4:32
10.	"Makuta Is Dume"	2:05
11.	"Heart of Metru Nui"	6:17
12.	"Follow the Light / Mask of Time"	4:52
13.	"Lhikan's Death / Vakama's Power Found"	5:27
14.	"Island of Mata Nui"	4:25
15.	"Bionicle 2 End Titles"	1:28
16.	"Unused Alternate Desert/Kikeinalo Theme (Bonus Trk)"	1:28
17.	"Lhikan Theme Sketch (DVD Menu)"	1:09
Total length:		57:27

==== Unreleased tracks ====
Nathan Furst said that he purposefully excluded two tracks from the album due to their redundancy and because they would have disrupted the flow of the album. He has also stated that he plans to distribute them at some point, though the distribution method has yet to be confirmed.

It is not known which music the two tracks encompass that is absent from the release.

=== Web of Shadows ===
Bionicle 3: Web of Shadows - Original Score Soundtrack

Film score by Nathan Furst
- Released: December 22, 2017
- Genre: Soundtrack
- Length: 1:05:43
- Label: Rising Phoenix Records

Nathan Furst chronology
Bionicle 2: Legends of Metru Nui - Original Score Soundtrack (2017)	Bionicle 3: Web of Shadows - Original Score Soundtrack (2017)

The Web of Shadows soundtrack was released on December 22, 2017, twelve years after the film's release and ten days after the previous soundtrack. Like the Mask of Light soundtrack, it contains the entire score as it was written for the film.

The soundtrack also includes Furst's original sketch for Roodaka's theme which was not used in the film itself, but a variation of it can be heard in one of the film's DVD menus.

==== Track listing ====
No.	Title	Length
1.	"Web of Shadows"	2:15
2.	"Shipwrecked and Stunned"	3:18
3.	"Sidorak and Roodaka"	3:57
4.	"Flying Escape"	3:41
5.	"Can't Be Ugly"	0:44
6.	"Roodaka's Evil Plan"	2:14
7.	"The Rahaga"	2:07
8.	"Vakama Captured"	5:03
9.	"Roodaka Seduces Vakama"	2:47
10.	"I Doubt You'd Recognize Me"	1:56
11.	"The Great Temple"	2:55
12.	"Vakama Has Changed"	2:23
13.	"The Falling Tears"	2:49
14.	"The Visorak Hoard"	0:48
15.	"Keetongu Found"	4:18
16.	"Bow Down to Vakama and Sidorak"	7:02
17.	"What Happened to You"	1:09
18.	"Strength Comes from Unity"	8:52
19.	"Makuta Set Free"	3:14
20.	"Off to Mata Nui"	3:18
21.	"Roodaka (Unused Theme)"	1:07
Total length:		1:05:43

== Reception ==
The music of the first two films received favorable notes from some who reviewed the DVD releases. Furst's work on Legends of Metru Nui also earned the film a nomination for Best Original Score at the 2004 DVD Exclusive Awards.

David Molina, co-director of the first three films, gave praise to Furst's work on Web of Shadows, saying that "watching the picture with his music for the first time is an amazing experience. The story is suddenly alive and emotional".

Furst himself has described the Bionicle scores as some of the best music of his career, citing the creative freedom granted to him by the filmmakers.

== Bionicle trilogy concert ==
In 2018, Furst expressed interest in organizing a concert in which highlights from the first three film scores are performed, and asked for input from fans who would be interested in such an event.
