= Nathan Furst =

American television and film composer (born 1978)

- Born: July 4, 1978 (age 48); United States
- Occupation: Composer

Nathan Furst (born July 4, 1978) is an American television and film composer.

Furst is the son of Lorraine (Wright) and actor Stephen Furst. Furst is the husband of Britlin Lee. Furst's first major film was the 1998 film A Moment of Confusion. He then went on to compose music for other films such as the Bionicle trilogy (Bionicle: Mask of Light, Bionicle 2: Legends of Metru Nui and Bionicle 3: Web of Shadows), Dust to Glory, Lake Placid 2, Lake Placid 3 and Act of Valor. Some of the television shows for which he has composed are The Real World and Max Steel. His more recent scores include Waiting for Lightning, Need for Speed, Cold Moon, and 6 Below: Miracle on the Mountain. He is a frequent collaborator with director Scott Waugh, having scored most of his films since Act of Valor.

After they remained unreleased for over a decade, Furst officially released his scores for the Bionicle films in 2017. Furst has described these scores as some of his best work due to the amount of creative freedom he was given.

== Filmography ==
Year	Title	Director(s)	Notes
1998	A Moment of Confusion	Billinjer C. Tran	
1999	Baby Huey's Great Easter Adventure	Stephen Furst	
2000	Stageghost	Stephen Furst	
2001	Hollywood Remembers Walter Matthau	Dawn Ostlund	Television documentary
2003	Christmas Vacation 2: Cousin Eddie's Island Adventure	Nick Marck	Television film
2003	Bionicle: Mask of Light	David Molina and Terry Shakespeare	Direct-to-DVD
2004	Bionicle 2: Legends of Metru Nui	David Molina and Terry Shakespeare	Direct-to-DVD
2005	Bionicle 3: Web of Shadows	David Molina and Terry Shakespeare	Direct-to-DVD
2005	Dust to Glory	Dana Brown	Documentary
2005	BIONICLE: Shadow Play	Billy Jones and Craig Russo	Video short
2006	Magma: Volcanic Disaster	Ian Gilmour	Television film
2006	Though None Go with Me	Armand Mastroianni	Television film
2006	The Curse of King Tut's Tomb	Russell Mulcahy	Television film
2006	Basilisk: The Serpent King	Louie Myman	Television film
2006	Game Day	Stephen Furst	
2007	Already Dead	Joe Otting	
2007	Navy SWCC	Mike McCoy and Scott Waugh	Documentary short
2007	Grendel	Nick Lyon	Television film
2007	Point of Entry	Stephen Bridgewater	Television film
2007	Murder 101: College Can Be Murder	John Putch	Television film
2007	Lake Placid 2	David Flores	Television film
2007	Roxy Hunter and the Mystery of the Moody Ghost	Eleanor Lindo	Television film
2008	Roxy Hunter and the Myth of the Mermaid	Eleanor Lindo	Television film
2008	Roxy Hunter and the Secret of the Shaman	Eleanor Lindo	Television film
2008	Roxy Hunter and the Horrific Halloween	Eleanor Lindo	Television film
2008	Ghost Voyage	James Oxford	Television film
2008	Shark Swarm	James A. Contner	Television film
2008	Copperhead	Todor Chapkanov	Television film
2008	A Gunfighter's Pledge	Armand Mastroianni	Television film
2009	Relative Stranger	Charles Burnett	Television film
2009	Under New Management	Joe Otting	
2010	Movin' In	Griff Furst	
2010	Lake Placid 3	Griff Furst	Television film
2010	Making a Scene	Unknown	Television documentary series 2 episodes
2011	Love's Christmas Journey	David S. Cass Sr.	Television film
2011	The Inheritance	Robert O'Hara	
2011	Maskerade	Griff Furst	
2012	A Taste of Romance	Lee Rose	
2012	Act of Valor	Mike McCoy and Scott Waugh	
2012	Waiting for Lightning	Jacob Rosenberg	Documentary
2012	Strawberry Summer	Kevin Connor	Television film
2012	The Seven Year Hitch	Bradford May	Television film
2013	12 Rounds 2: Reloaded	Roel Reiné	
2014	Need for Speed	Scott Waugh	
2014	The Date Escape	Fernando Raigoza Jr.	Short
2015	The Talk	Joe Otting	Short
2016	Saltwater	A.B. Stone	Second unit director Television film
2016	Cold Moon	Griff Furst	
2017	6 Below: Miracle on the Mountain	Scott Waugh	
2017	Trailer Park Shark	Griff Furst	Co-writer; Television film
2018	Curse of the Dream Witch	Griff Furst	Co-director; Television film
2023	Hidden Strike	Scott Waugh	
2023	57 Seconds	Rusty Cundieff	
