= Dust to Glory =

- Theatrical release poster
- Directed by: Dana Brown
- Written by: Dana Brown
- Produced by: Scott Waugh; Mike McCoy
- Narrated by: Dana Brown
- Cinematography: Kevin Ward
- Edited by: Dana Brown; Scott Waugh
- Music by: Nathan Furst
- Production companies: Brown Wa Pictures; Score International
- Distributed by: IFC Films
- Release date: April 1, 2005
- Running time: 97 minutes
- Country: United States
- Language: English
- Box office: $640,013

Dust to Glory is a 2005 American documentary film written, narrated, and directed by Dana Brown centering on the off-road motorsport race Baja 1000. Filming occurred throughout the 2003 event.

Dust to Glory received a limited release in the United States on April 1, 2005, and a wide release on April 22, by IFC Films. The film was released to DVD by MGM Home Entertainment and Sony Pictures Home Entertainment.

== Cast ==
Mario Andretti, Sal Fish, Chad McQueen, Jimmy Vasser, Roberto Guerrero, Michel Jourdain Jr., Robby Gordon, Ricky Johnson, Malcolm Smith, Johnny Campbell, Steve Hengeveld, J.N. Roberts, Corky McMillin, Andy McMillin, Scott McMillin, Mark McMillin, Mike McCoy, Eric Solorzano, Larry Roeseler.

== Reviews ==
- "All in all, this is an entertaining and informative film that exposes an event unlike any other. Some scenes are strictly for race lovers, but there is enough here overall to entertain curious outsiders." -Jeff Otto, IGN Filmforce

On review aggregator website Rotten Tomatoes, the film holds an approval rating of 60% based on 67 reviews, with an average rating of 6.3/10.

== See also ==
- Off-road racing
- SCORE International
