= Web of Shadows =

Web of Shadows may refer to:

- Bionicle 3: Web of Shadows, the third movie of the Bionicle series
- Spider-Man: Web of Shadows, a 2008 video game based on the Marvel Comics character Spider-Man
