= Act of Valor =

2012 film by Mouse McCoy and Scott Waugh

- Theatrical release poster
- Directed by: Mouse McCoy; Scott Waugh
- Written by: Kurt Johnstad
- Produced by: Mouse McCoy; Scott Waugh
- Starring: U.S. Navy SEALs; Roselyn Sánchez; Jason Cottle; Alex Veadov; Nestor Serrano; Emilio Rivera
- Cinematography: Shane Hurlbut
- Edited by: Michael Tronick; Scott Waugh
- Music by: Nathan Furst
- Production company: Bandito Brothers
- Distributed by: Relativity Media
- Release date: February 24, 2012
- Running time: 111 minutes
- Country: United States
- Language: English
- Budget: $12 million
- Box office: $81.3 million

Act of Valor is a 2012 American action film produced and directed by Mouse McCoy and Scott Waugh and written by Kurt Johnstad. The film stars active duty U.S. Navy SEALs and U.S. Navy Special Warfare Combatant-craft Crewmen, as well as Roselyn Sánchez, Jason Cottle, Alex Veadov, Nestor Serrano, and Emilio Rivera.

Act of Valor was released in the United States on February 24, 2012, by Relativity Media. The film received generally negative reviews from critics, but was a box office success, grossing over $81 million worldwide against a production budget of $12 million. It was nominated for Best Original Song at the 70th Golden Globe Awards.

== Plot ==
In Manila, a terrorist assassinates the United States Ambassador to the Philippines, and also kills his son and dozens of children at an international primary school in a terrorist bombing. The mastermind, a Chechen terrorist, Abu Shabal, escapes to a training camp in Indonesia. Elsewhere in Costa Rica, two CIA officers, Walter Ross and Lisa Morales, meet to consolidate intelligence about their target, a drug smuggler named Mikhail "Christo" Troykovich. Christo's men kill Ross and capture Morales, who is imprisoned in a jungle compound and tortured.

At Coronado, the members of Bandito Platoon, SEAL Team 7 are at home. Lieutenant Rorke confides to Chief Dave that his wife is pregnant and has the entire team spend time together with their families until their next deployment. A squad from the platoon consisting of Rorke, Dave, Wiemy, Mikey, Ray, Sonny, and Ajay, is then deployed to Costa Rica to exfiltrate Morales.

The SEALs insert into the jungle via HALO and hold position outside the compound all night. At dawn, they raid the compound and eliminate several guards before extracting Morales and a cell phone containing the information she had gathered. Alerted by the assault, an enemy quick reaction force attempts to pursue and the SEALs commandeer a truck to exfiltrate. The pursuit forces them to revert to a tertiary extraction point where two SWCC boats extract the team, with Mikey being wounded in action.

Christo and Shabal, who are revealed to have been childhood friends, meet in Kyiv. Christo knows the CIA is watching him and informs Shabal that subordinates will complete their project, which is to equip suicide bombers with specialized undetectable explosive vests.

On the amphibious assault ship USS Bonhomme Richard, Rorke is informed that the intelligence recovered confirms Shabal and Christo were working together. Shabal seeks to bring jihad to the U.S., while Christo provides the routes for smuggling drugs and people into the U.S. Ajay and Ray are sent to Somalia, where an arms transfer involving Shabal is taking place. The remaining SEALs, comprising Rorke, Dave, Sonny and Weimy, stay in the U.S. in case the terrorists make it in. Miller himself has been reassigned to SEAL Team Four, hunting for Christo somewhere on the oceans. Lieutenant Rorke gives Dave a letter to give to his family in case he is killed.

Shabal and sixteen terrorists are found to be on an island off Baja California, where the SEALs act to secure the island, killing eight terrorists. Shabal and eight others escape. Elsewhere, in the South Pacific, SEAL Team Four captures Christo and interrogate him, learning that Shabal's plot is to outdo the September 11 attacks.

The SEALs are informed that Shabal is en route to the U.S. via tunnels underneath a milk factory, and are ordered to link up with Mexican Special Forces and neutralize the remaining targets. Arriving at the factory, the SEALs and Mexican forces launch an assault there, engaging numerous Mexican cartel members and Shabal's terrorists in the process. During the gunfight, a combatant throws a grenade, and Rorke sacrifices himself by diving on it to save his team before it detonates, killing him. Dave pursues the terrorists and shoots them as they try to escape through the tunnels. He is then shot several times and gravely wounded by Shabal, who is intercepted and killed by Sonny before he can execute Dave.

At home, Rorke is given a military funeral with full honors, where the SEALs pay their respects. It is then revealed that Dave's narration throughout the movie was a written letter meant for Rorke's son. The film ends with a dedication to 60 U.S. Navy SEAL and Special Warfare Combatant-craft Crewmen (SWCC) killed in action since 9/11 along with a listing of their names as well as a photo montage of fallen public servants.

== Cast ==
- Jason Cottle as Yuri / Mohammad Abu Shabal, a Chechen terrorist
- Rorke Denver as Lieutenant Rorke James Engel, field commander of SEAL Team 7
- Dave Hansen as Chief Dave Nolan, a Chief of SEAL Team 7
- Sonny Manson as Sonny, a member of SEAL Team 7
- Brendan “Weimy” Weimholt as "Weimy", a member of SEAL Team 7
- Ajay "A.J." James as Ajay, a member of SEAL Team 7
- Ray Mendoza as Ray, a member of SEAL Team 7
- Mike Everett as Mikey, a member of SEAL Team 7
- Katelyn Lyons as Lieutenant Lyons, a US Navy Intelligence Officer attached to SEAL Team 7
- William "Bill" Austin as SWCC Boat Senior Chief Billy
- Duncan Smith as Captain Duncan Smith
- Callaghan as Admiral Callaghan (the true character name is Rear Admiral Dennis Moynihan)
- Alex Veadov as Mikhail "Christo" Troykovich, a drug smuggler working with Shabal
- Roselyn Sánchez as CIA Officer Lisa Morales
- Nestor Serrano as CIA Officer Walter Ross
- Emilio Rivera as Sanchez, a head cartel thug
- Ernie Reyes Jr. as Recruit, a Filipino jihadist suicide bomber recruited by Shabal to launch terrorist attacks over the States
- Drea Castro as Recruit, a Filipino jihadist suicide bomber recruited by Shabal to launch terrorist attacks over the States
- Marissa Labog as Recruit, a Filipino jihadist suicide bomber recruited by Shabal to launch terrorist attacks over the States
- Keo Woolford as Recruit, a Filipino jihadist suicide bomber recruited by Shabal to launch terrorist attacks over the States
- Thomas Rosales, Jr. as Christo's RHM
- Antoni Corone as Yacht Henchman #1
- Gonzalo Menendez as Commander Pedros, a Mexican Special Forces commander who teams up with the SEAL Team to take down Shabal
- Ailsa Marshall as Jackie Engel, Lieutenant Engel's Wife
- Derrick Van Orden as Senior Chief Otto Miller

== Production ==
=== Development ===
In 2007, Mike McCoy and Scott Waugh of Bandito Brothers Production filmed a promotional ad video for the Special Boat Teams which led the U.S. Navy to allow them to use actual active duty SEALs and Special Boat Team members. After spending so much time working closely with the SEALs and SWCC, McCoy and Waugh conceived the idea for a modern-day action movie about this covert and elite fighting force. As Act of Valor developed with the SEALs on board as advisors, the filmmakers realized that no actors could realistically portray or physically fill the roles they had written and the actual SEALs and SWCC were drafted to star in the film. The SEALs and Special Boat Team members would remain anonymous, as none of their names appear in the film's credits. Legendary Pictures' founder and then-chairman/CEO Thomas Tull serves as executive producer.

For the Navy, the film is an initiative to recruit SEALs and SWCC. According to The Huffington Post, the Navy required the active-duty SEALs to participate.

Following a bidding war with Dark Castle Entertainment, Alcon Entertainment (both companies had their own respective distribution deals with Legendary's then-partner Warner Bros.), Lionsgate, and FilmDistrict, Relativity Media acquired the rights to the project on June 12, 2011 for $13 million and a $30 million in prints and advertising commitment. Deadline Hollywood called it "the biggest money paid for a finished film with an unknown cast". The production budget was estimated to be between $15 million and $18 million.

=== Principal photography ===
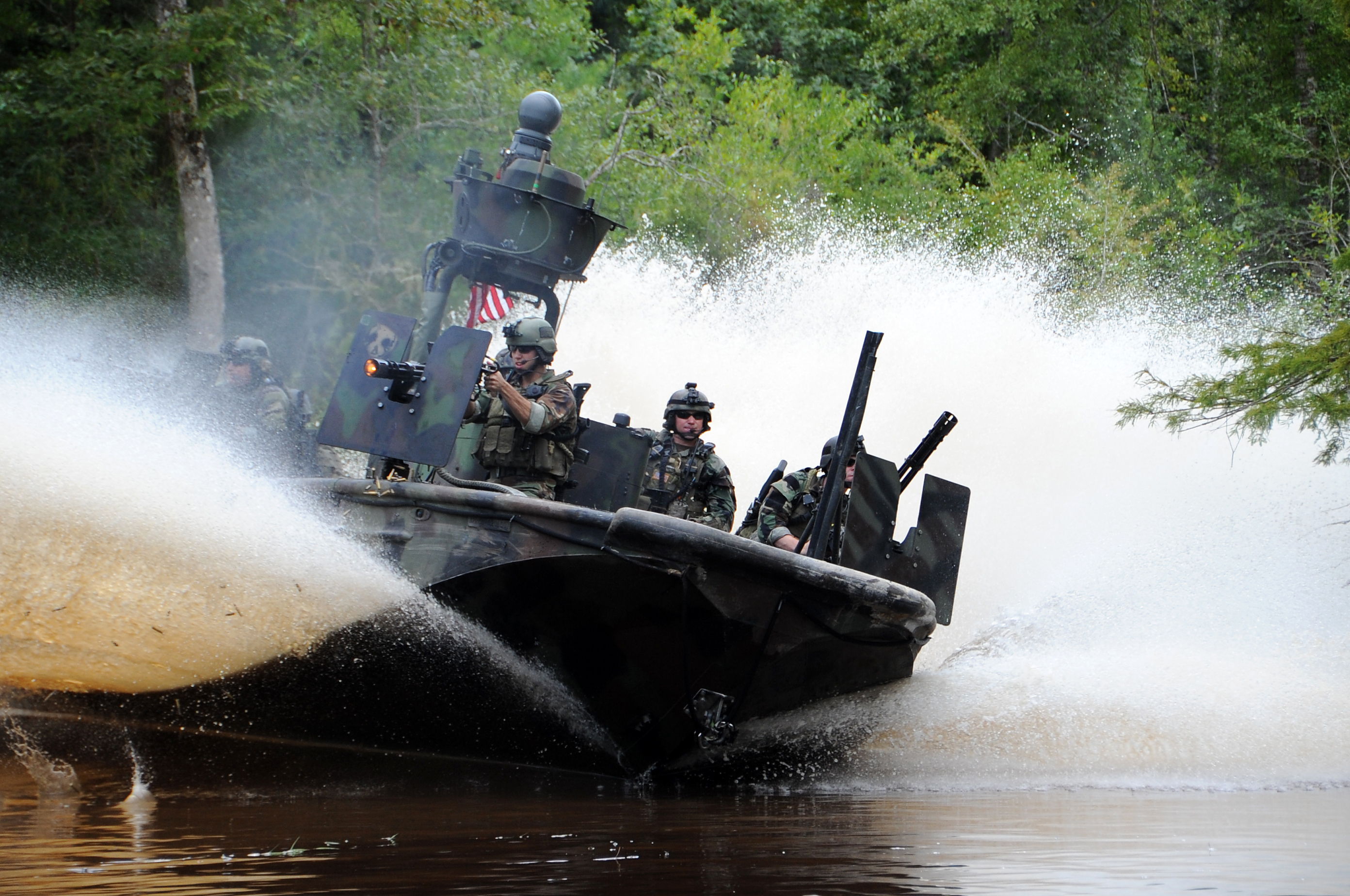
Shooting of a scene with SWCCs from Special Boat Team 22

Filming took place in Cambodia where an explosion was shot in Phnom Penh with 300 children as extras. Scenes were shot in San Diego at Blue Foot Bar and in a house in the North Park area. Other locations included Mexico, Puerto Rico, Ukraine, Florida, and at the John C. Stennis Space Center in Mississippi.

The crew filmed at Navy training sites to provide realistic settings, such as a drug cartel base, a terrorist camp on an isolated island, and a smuggler's yacht.

Cinematographer Shane Hurlbut used Canon EOS 5D Mark II cameras with Zeiss ZE and Panavision Primo lenses. The cameras followed the SEALs' planned out missions in the film. Hurlbut used an 18mm Zeiss ZE mounted on the SEALs' helmets to capture their point of view. The 25mm Zeiss ZE was used to capture natural light coming through windows. The 21mm Zeiss ZE was used as a stake cam so a truck could drive over it. The Navy held final cut privileges in order to remove any frames to address security concerns and kept raw footage to use for real-life training and other purposes.

== Release ==
Act of Valor was scheduled to be released on February 17, 2012 in the U.S. to coincide with Presidents' Day, but was pushed back to February 24, 2012. The film was released in the UK and Ireland on March 23 as Act of Valour by Momentum Pictures.

=== Home video releases ===
Act of Valor was released on Blu-ray Disc and DVD on June 5, 2012 with a rating of R.

=== Accolades ===
The film was a 2012 Teen Choice Awards nominee for Choice Action Movie.

== Reception ==
On Rotten Tomatoes the film has an approval rating of 28% based on 144 reviews with an average rating of 4.54/10. The site's critical consensus reads, "It's undeniably reverent of the real-life heroes in its cast, but Act of Valor lets them down with a clichéd script, stilted acting, and a jingoistic attitude that ignores the complexities of war." Metacritic assigned the film an average score of 40 out of 100, based on 34 critics, indicating "mixed or average" reviews. Audiences on CinemaScore gave the film an average grade of "A", on an A+ to F scale.

The film opened at #1 at the box office, earning $24.5 million in its opening weekend from 3,039 theaters for an average of $8,054 per theater.

Many reviews, both positive and negative, expressed praise for the action sequences while criticizing the plot and acting. Claudia Puig from USA Today, for example, said the action in the film is "breathtaking," but gave the film an overall negative review, in which she wrote that "the soldiers' awkward line readings are glaring enough to distract from the potency of the story." Similarly, Amy Biancolli from the San Francisco Chronicle wrote, "Act of Valor is intended to wow audiences with high-test action while planting a giant wet kiss on the smacker of the U.S. military – and it scores at both tasks," but that, ultimately, "the film gets snagged by its own narrative convention." Michael Rechtshaffen from The Hollywood Reporter had a similar opinion, stating, "Although the film has its undeniably immersive, convincing moments, the merging of dramatic re-creations and on-camera 'performances' proves less seamlessly executed than those masterfully coordinated land, sea and air missions."

Roger Ebert of the Chicago Sun-Times gave the film two and a half out of four stars, and complained that "we don't get to know the characters as individuals, they don't have personality traits, they have no back stories, they don't speak in colorful dialogue, and after the movie you'd find yourself describing events but not people." The film was accused of having an antisemitic subtext by bloggers Debbie Schlussel and Pamela Geller as well as other Jewish sources.

== Soundtrack ==
Relativity Media released the film's soundtrack on February 21, 2012. It includes 10 songs by country music artists. The first cut on the soundtrack, Keith Urban's "For You", was released as a single. The song was nominated for a Golden Globe Award for Best Original Song.

== See also ==
- List of films featuring the United States Navy SEALs
