= Brilliant Animation Studios =

Taiwanese-American animation studios

Brilliant Animation Studios Ltd.
- Native name: 采億動畫影業
- Formerly: Wang Film Productions (1978–2009); Wang Animation Studios (2009–2013); WangFilm AnimationStudio/Wang Film Studios (2013–2019)
- Type: Subsidiary
- Industry: Traditional hand-drawn 2D Animation
- Predecessor: Chunghwa Cartoon Company
- Founded: July 10, 1978; 48 years ago in Xindian City, Taiwan
- Founder: James Chung-Yuan Wang
- Headquarters: No. 542-6, Zhongzheng Rd., Xindian City, Taipei County 231, Taiwan; Los Angeles, California, United States
- Key people: John Liaw (CEO)
- Products: Feature films, television series
- Services: Animation outsourcing
- Owner: Hanna-Barbera (50%, 1978–1990s); Government of Taiwan
- Parent: Brilliant Pictures Group (2013–present)
- Subsidiaries: CGCG, Inc. CGCG Studio, Inc.
- Website: brilliant-pictures.com

Wang Film Productions Co., Ltd., now known as Brilliant Animation Studios Ltd. (also known as Hong Guang Animation (宏廣)) is a Taiwanese animation studio that was founded in 1978. The company, based in Xindian, Taipei with offices in Los Angeles, California, is one of the oldest and most prolific animation studios in Taiwan, and has done traditional hand-drawn 2D animation and ink-and-paint for various animated TV shows and films for studios across North America, Europe and Asia-Pacific.

== History ==
Wang Film/Cuckoo's Nest, the studio's original name, was founded by James Chung-Yuan Wang (王中元 Wang Chung-yuan), Hsu Chih-wei and Lu Kuang-chi started the studio in 1978 as a Taiwanese subcontractor for various Japanese animation studios and also an overseas facility for the American animation studio Hanna-Barbera. Hanna-Barbera sent Jerry Smith to help set up the company and eventually owned half the company. Many employees from Chunghwa Cartoon came to work at Cuckoo's Nest Studio along with employees from Ying Ren Cartoon and Shang Shang. Don Patterson was brought on board as a trainer. The company started with about 50 employees but soon had 300.

In the company's first year, 17 episodes were produced for Hanna-Barbera. Quickly, they had contracts with Disney, Warner Bros., and Universal.

With increased wages and foreign exchange rates, Cuckoo's was being priced out of the outsourcing market. Thus the CNS began restructuring. A Mainland Chinese subsidiary was opened in 1990 in Zhuhai, southern Guangdong province. In 1991, Cuckoo's Nest had to lay off 200 employees in Taipei. The company began computerization to reduce costs, while training some that would have been laid off to operate the computers. By 1993, the company had capacity to produce 200 half-hour episodes each year. In 1993, a Shanghai unit, possibly a joint venture, was under consideration with Bangkok as an alternative. Also, internal developed and produced material was expected to start hitting the market in mid-1994.

In early 1991, Hanna-Barbera sold its digital ink-and-paint software to the company which was developed by Marc Levoy.

The company is also notable for their work on the overseas production for Nelvana's Care Bears franchise, Film Roman's Garfield and Friends and Bobby's World, Klasky Csupo's Rugrats pilot and first season, Disney's DuckTales and Stretch Films' Courage the Cowardly Dog. They also helped produce effects for the 1982 film Tron and some Peanuts television specials, production ink & paint matting, and animation assistance.

== Filmography ==
=== TV series ===
Outsourced from Hanna-Barbera

Show	Year(s)	Notes
Captain Caveman and the Teen Angels	1977–1980	credited as Jerry Smith
Laff-A-Lympics	1978	season 2
Godzilla	1978–1979	uncredited
Fred and Barney Meet the Thing	1979	uncredited
Super Friends	1980–1983	credited as James Wang
The Fonz and the Happy Days Gang	1980–1981	credited as James Wang
Laverne & Shirley	1981–1982	credited as James Wang
The Little Rascals	1982–1983	credited as James Wang
Shirt Tales	1982–1983	credited as James Wang
The Dukes	1983	credited as James Wang
The Biskitts	1983	credited as James Wang
Monchhichis	1983	credited as James Wang
The Smurfs	1983–1989	seasons 3-4; credited as James Wang, seasons 6-9; animation production shared with Toei Animation in season 7
Pac-Man	1983	season 2; credited as James Wang
The New Scooby and Scrappy-Doo Show	1983	credited as James Wang
Super Friends: The Legendary Super Powers Show	1984	credited as James Wang
Snorks	1984–1985	season 1; credited as James Wang
Challenge of the GoBots	1984–1985	season 1; credited as James Wang
The Greatest Adventure: Stories from the Bible	1985–1992	direct-to-video series; 5 episodes: "Samson and Delilah", "Noah's Ark", "Daniel and the Lion's Den", "The Nativity", and "The Creation"
The Jetsons	1985	season 2; credited as James Wang
Paw Paws	1985–1986	
Yogi's Treasure Hunt	1985–1988	
Galtar and the Golden Lance	1985–1986	
The Super Powers Team: Galactic Guardians	1985	
The New Adventures of Jonny Quest	1986–1987	
Wildfire	1986	
The Flintstone Kids	1986–1987	
Pound Puppies	1986	season 1
Foofur	1986	season 1
Popeye and Son	1987	
A Pup Named Scooby-Doo	1988–1991	
The Completely Mental Misadventures of Ed Grimley	1988	
The Further Adventures of SuperTed	1989	
Timeless Tales from Hallmark	1990–1991	direct-to-video series
Bill & Ted's Excellent Adventures	1990	Season 1
Tom & Jerry Kids	1990–1993	
Gravedale High	1990	
The Pirates of Dark Water	1991–1993	
Yo Yogi!	1991	
Capitol Critters	1992	
2 Stupid Dogs	1993–1995	
What a Cartoon!	1995	"Dino: Stay Out!"

Outsourced from Disney Television Animation

Show	Year(s)	Notes
DuckTales	1987; 1989–90	select episodes
Chip 'n Dale: Rescue Rangers	1989–90	16 Season 2 episodes: The Luck Stops Here, An Elephant Never Suspects, Fake Me to Your Leader, Last Train to Cashville, The Case of the Cola Cult, Throw Mummy from the Train, A Wolf in Cheap Clothing, Robocat, Does Pavlov Ring a Bell, Seer No Evil, Chocolate Chips, The Last Leprechaun, Double 'O Chipmunk, It's a Bird, It's Insane, It's Dale!, Short Order Crooks and Out of Scale
TaleSpin	1990–91	8 episodes: The Bigger They Are, the Louder the Oink, Bearly Alive, On a Wing and Bear, The Old Man and the SeaDuck, Sheepskin Deep, Waiders of the Wost Tweasure, Mach One for the Gipper and A Jolly Molly Christmas
Darkwing Duck	1991	3 episodes: The Darkwing Squad, Inside Binkie's Brain and Slime Okay, You're Okay
The New Adventures of Winnie the Pooh	1991	5 episodes: "Sorry, Wrong Slusher", "A Pooh Day Afternoon", "Home is Where the Home Is", "The Wise Have It", "To Dream the Impossible Scheme"
Goof Troop	1992–93	8 episodes: Buddy Building, Where There's a Will, There's a Goof, Terminal Pete, Rally Round the Goof, Frankengoof, Calling All Goofs, Pistolgeist and Tee for Two
Raw Toonage	1992	
Bonkers	1993–94	4 episodes
Marsupilami	1993–94	
The Little Mermaid	1993–94	
Aladdin	1994	14 episodes: Elemental, My Dear Jasmine, To Cure a Thief, My Fair Aladdin, Web of Fear, Seems Like Old Crimes: Part 1, Seems Like Old Crimes: Part 2, The Love Bug, The Vapor Chase, The Day the Bird Stood Still, Smells Like Trouble, Armored and Dangerous, Dune Quixote, The Prophet Motive and Sea No Evil
Gargoyles	1995	"Enter Macbeth"
The Shnookums and Meat Funny Cartoon Show	1995	
Timon & Pumbaa	1995–1999	
Mighty Ducks: The Animated Series	1996–1997	2 episodes: "Dungeons and Ducks", "Puck Fiction"
Quack Pack	1996	5 episodes
Jungle Cubs	1996–1998	
101 Dalmatians: The Series	1997–1998	12 episodes
Hercules: The Animated Series	1998–1999	12 episodes
The Weekenders	2000–2001	
Buzz Lightyear of Star Command	2000–01	10 episodes
Teacher's Pet	2001	9 episodes
The Legend of Tarzan	2001–2003	
Fillmore!	2002	21 episodes
Lilo & Stitch: The Series	2003–05	13 episodes
Dave the Barbarian	2004–05	13 episodes
Brandy & Mr. Whiskers	2004–06	
W.I.T.C.H.	2004–05	Season 1
American Dragon: Jake Long	2005–07	14 episodes
The Emperor's New School	2006–08	23 episodes
The Replacements	2006–09	23 episodes
Phineas and Ferb	2007–15	
The 7D	2015–16	Season 2
Milo Murphy's Law	2016–19	with Synergy Animation

Outsourced from Warner Bros. Animation

Show	Year(s)	Notes
Tiny Toon Adventures	1990–92	31 episodes: The Looney Beginning (animated by Kennedy Cartoons with a few scenes by Wang Film Productions), You Asked for It, Rock 'n' Roar, Career Oppor-Toon-ities, Dating, Acme Acres Style, Hare Raising Night, Citizen Max, Prom-ise Her Anything, The Acme Acres Zone, Starting from Scratch, Looking Out for the Little Guy, Spring in Acme Acres, Ask Mr. Popular, Europe in 30 Minutes, Fairy Tales for the 90's, Here's Hamton, No Toon Is An Island, Return to the Acme Acres Zone, Mr. Popular's Rules of Cool!, Viewer Mail Day, New Character Day (animated by Kennedy Cartoons with a few scenes by Wang Film Productions), K-ACME TV, High Toon (animated by Kennedy Cartoons with a few scenes by Wang Film Productions), Going Places, Best of Buster Day, Toon TV, New Class Day, Flea for Your Life, Weekday Afternoon Live, Buster's Directorial Debut and The Horror of Slumber Party Mountain
Taz-Mania	1991–95	
Animaniacs	1993–98	
Pinky and the Brain	1995–98	
Pinky, Elmyra and the Brain	1998	
Histeria!	1998–2000	
Detention	1999–2000	
Baby Looney Tunes	2002–03	
What's New, Scooby-Doo?	2002–03	4 episodes: It's Mean, It's Green, It's the Mystery Machine, Roller Ghoster Ride, A Scooby-Doo Christmas and Pompeii and Circumstance
Ozzy & Drix	2002–04	

Outsourced from DIC Entertainment

Show	Year(s)	Notes	Client
Les Aventures de Plume d'Elan	1979–81		DIC Audiovisuel (France)
Ulysses 31	1981–82	uncredited	DIC Audiovisuel (France)
Inspector Gadget	1983	season 1 only, 12 episodes: Down on the Farm, Gadget at the Circus, The Amazon, Movie Set, Amusement Park, Art Heist, M.A.D. Trap, Eye of the Dragon, King Wrong, Pirate Island, Smeldorado and So It Is Written	DIC Entertainment
Kidd Video	1984	first season only	DIC Entertainment; Saban Productions
Heathcliff	1984 85	credited as James Wang	DIC Entertainment
Hulk Hogan's Rock 'n' Wrestling	1985–86	Animation production shared with Shaft and Hanho Heung-Up (Korea)	DIC Entertainment
Kissyfur	1988	season 2 only	DIC Entertainment; Saban Productions
The New Adventures of Beany and Cecil	1988		DIC Entertainment
Slimer! and The Real Ghostbusters	1988	Slimer! segments	DIC Entertainment
New Kids on the Block	1990		DIC Enterprises
Street Sharks	1995	season 2 only	DIC Productions, L.P.

Outsourced from Nelvana

Show	Year(s)	Notes
Ewoks	1985–86	
The Care Bears Family	1986–88	
Madballs: Escape from Orb	1986	
The Video Adventures of Clifford the Big Red Dog	1988	
Beetlejuice	1989–91	
Eek! The Cat	1992–97	
Family Dog	1993	
Tales from the Cryptkeeper	1993–94	
Free Willy	1994–95	
Ace Ventura: Pet Detective	1995–97	seasons 1–2
Stickin' Around	1996	Season 1
Pippi Longstocking	1997–98	
The Future Is Wild	2007–08	

Outsourced from other studios

Show	Year(s)	Notes	Client
ThunderCats	1985–86	credited as James C.Y. Wang	Rankin/Bass Animated Entertainment
SilverHawks	1986	uncredited	Rankin/Bass Animated Entertainment
Lazer Tag Academy	1986		Saban Productions
Rambo and the Forces of Freedom	1986		Ruby-Spears Productions
The Comic Strip	1987	credited as James C.Y. Wang	Rankin/Bass Animated Entertainment
Mighty Mouse: The New Adventures	1987–88		Bakshi/Hyde Ventures
Garbage Pail Kids	1987–88		CBS Entertainment Productions
Wisdom of the Gnomes	1987–88		BRB International (Spain)
The Adventures of Raggedy Ann and Andy	1988		CBS Entertainment Productions
Garfield and Friends	1988–94		Film Roman
Police Academy: The Animated Series	1988–89		Ruby-Spears Productions
Bobobobs	1988–89		BRB Internacional (Spain)
The Return of Dogtanian	1989		BRB Internacional (Spain)
Dink, the Little Dinosaur	1989–90		Ruby-Spears Productions
Teenage Mutant Ninja Turtles	1989–92		Murakami-Wolf-Swenson
Peter Pan and the Pirates	1990–91		Fox Children's Productions
Bobby's World	1990–98		Film Roman
Zazoo U	1990		Film Roman
Piggsburg Pigs!	1990	uncredited	Ruby-Spears Productions
Rugrats	1990–92	pilot and season 1	Klasky Csupo
James Bond Jr.	1991		Murakami-Wolf-Swenson
Mother Goose and Grimm	1991		Film Roman
Back to the Future: The Animated Series	1991–92		Universal Cartoon Studios
Fievel's American Tails	1992		Universal Cartoon Studios/Nelvana (Canada)
Sandokan	1992		BRB International
The Pink Panther	1993–95		MGM Animation
Wild West C.O.W.-Boys of Moo Mesa	1993	Season 2	Ruby-Spears Productions
The Itsy Bitsy Spider	1993–95		Hyperion Animation
The Ren & Stimpy Show	1994	3 episodes	Games Animation
The Busy World of Richard Scarry	1994–97	seasons 2-5	CINAR (Canada)
Willy Fog 2	1994–95		BRB Internacional (Spain)
Fantastic Four	1994	season 1; animation production shared with Kennedy Cartoons	Marvel Films
Mort & Phil	1994		BRB Internacional (Spain)
Dog Tracer	1994		Marina Productions
Life with Louie	1994–98		Hyperion Animation
Happily Ever After: Fairy Tales for Every Child	1995	season 1	Hyperion Animation
The Mask: Animated Series	1995	season 1	Film Roman
Littlest Pet Shop	1995		Sunbow Entertainment
The Little Lulu Show	1995–96	seasons 1-2	CINAR (Canada)
The Mozart Band	1995		BRB Internacional (Spain); Marathon Productions (France)
All Dogs Go to Heaven: The Series	1996–98		Metro-Goldwyn-Mayer Animation
Hey Arnold!	1996–97	13 episodes	Games Animation
The Oz Kids	1996–97		Hyperion Animation
The Country Mouse and the City Mouse Adventures	1997–99		CINAR; France Animation (France)
The Adventures of Paddington Bear	1997–2001		CINAR (Canada)
Bibi Blocksberg	1997		Kiddinx (Germany)
The Fantastic Voyages of Sinbad the Sailor	1998		Fred Wolf Films
Troll Tales	1999		
Chucklewood Critters	1999	season 2; animated by PT Asiana Wang	
Dragon Tales	1999–2000	season 1 interstitials	Adelaide Productions
Courage the Cowardly Dog	1999–2002		Stretch Films
Generation O!	2000–01		Sunbow Entertainment
Poochini's Yard	2000		Wild Brain
Sagwa, the Chinese Siamese Cat	2001–02		CinéGroupe (Canada)
Make Way for Noddy	2001–06		SD Entertainment
ChalkZone	2002–05		Nickelodeon Animation Studio
Jungledyret Hugo	2002–03		A. Film Production (Denmark)
Benjamin Blümchen	2002–03		Kiddinx
The Cartoon Cartoon Show	2002	"Jeffrey Cat: Claw and Order — All Dogs Don't Go to Heaven"	Cartoon Network Studios
Stuart Little: The Animated Series	2003		Adelaide Productions
Lenny & Sid	2003		Toonacious Family Entertainment
Momo	2003		
Winx Club	2004	season 1	Rainbow S.p.A. (Italy)
Stripperella	2004	3 episodes	Spike Animation
The Fairytaler	2004–05		
Alien Racers	2005		SD Entertainment
Random! Cartoons	2006–07		Nickelodeon Animation Studio
My Friends Tigger & Pooh	2007–10		Walt Disney Television Animation
Care Bears: Adventures in Care-a-lot	2007–08		SD Entertainment
The Land Before Time	2007–08		Universal Animation Studios
Ni Hao, Kai-Lan	2008–11	Animation shared with Saerom Animation	Nickelodeon Animation Studio
Curious George	2018–19	seasons 10-11	Universal Animation Studios
Saturday Morning All Star Hits!	2021	additional animation	Bento Box Entertainment

=== Television films and specials ===
- The Betty Boop Movie Mystery (1989) (co-produced by King Features)
- The Bug Hunt (1996, Disney Television Animation)
- Care Bears Nutcracker Suite (1988, Nelvana and Telefilm Canada)
- Cartoon All-Stars to the Rescue (1990) (co-produced by Southern Star Productions)
- Christmas in Tattertown (1988, Nickelodeon)
- Dieter: Der Film (2000, TFC Trickompany)
- The Flintstone Kids' "Just Say No" Special (1988, Hanna-Barbera Productions)
- Garfield's Feline Fantasies and Garfield Gets a Life (1990, 1991, Film Roman, United Media and PAWS, Inc.)
- Hägar the Horrible: Hägar Knows Best (1989, Hanna-Barbera Productions)
- Hanna-Barbera Superstars 10 TV movies (1987–1988, Hanna-Barbera Productions)
- Peanuts (three specials, Snoopy's Reunion, It's Christmastime Again, Charlie Brown & You're in the Super Bowl, Charlie Brown, 1991, 1992, 1994)
- Scooby-Doo in Arabian Nights (1994, Hanna-Barbera Productions)
- Tiny Toon Spring Break (1994, Warner Bros. Animation and Amblin Entertainment)
- The Town Santa Forgot (1993, Hanna-Barbera Productions)
- The Wind in the Willows (1987, Rankin/Bass Productions)
- Yogi Bear's All Star Comedy Christmas Caper (1982, Hanna-Barbera Productions)

=== Feature films ===
Original productions

- Uncle Niou's Great Adventure (1982)
- Doraemon Robot Wars (1983)
- Funky Space Monkey
- Fire Ball (2005)
- Lin Wang (2018) (currently in production)

Outsourced productions

- The Adventures of Brer Rabbit (2006, Universal Animation Studios)
- Aladdin (1992, Walt Disney Feature Animation)
- An All Dogs Christmas Carol (1998, Metro-Goldwyn-Mayer Animation)
- All Dogs Go to Heaven 2 (1996, Metro-Goldwyn-Mayer Animation)
- Annabelle's Wish (1997, Ralph Edwards Productions)
- Babes in Toyland (1997, Metro-Goldwyn-Mayer Animation)
- Balto II: Wolf Quest (2002, Universal Animation Studios)
- Balto III: Wings of Change (2004, Universal Animation Studios)
- Beauty and the Beast: The Enchanted Christmas (1997, Walt Disney Television Animation)
- Bebe's Kids (1992, Hyperion Pictures)
- Bionicle: Mask of Light (2003, Lego, Miramax Films, Buena Vista, Create TV & Film, and Creative Capers Entertainment)
- Bionicle 2: Legends of Metru Nui (2004, Lego, Miramax Films, Buena Vista, Create TV & Film, and Creative Capers Entertainment)
- Bionicle 3: Web of Shadows (2005, Lego, Miramax Films, Buena Vista, Create TV & Film, and Creative Capers Entertainment)
- The Brave Little Toaster (1987, Hyperion Pictures and Atlantic/Kushner-Locke)
- Candy Land: The Great Lollipop Adventure (2005, Hasbro Entertainment and SD Entertainment)
- The Care Bears Adventure in Wonderland (1987, Nelvana)
- The Care Bears Movie (1985, Nelvana)
- Care Bears Movie II: A New Generation (1986, Nelvana)
- Charlotte's Web 2: Wilbur's Great Adventure (2003, Paramount Pictures, Universal Animation Studios and Nickelodeon)
- Curious George (2006, Universal Animation Studios)
- The Emperor's New Groove (2000, Walt Disney Feature Animation)
- Felidae (1994, TFC Trickompany, Animationstudio Ludewig, Uli Meyer Animation and Natterjack Animation)
- FernGully: The Last Rainforest (1992, Kroyer Films, Youngheart Productions and FAI Films)
- FernGully 2: The Magical Rescue (1998, WildBrain)
- GoBots: Battle of the Rock Lords (1986, Hanna-Barbera Productions and Tonka)
- Hercules: Zero to Hero (1999, Walt Disney Television Animation)
- Holly Hobbie and Friends: Surprise Party (2005, Nickelodeon Animation Studio)
- Holly Hobbie and Friends: Christmas Wishes (2006, Nickelodeon Animation Studio)
- Holly Hobbie and Friends: Best Friends Forever (2007, Nickelodeon Animation Studio)
- How to Hook Up Your Home Theater (2007, Walt Disney Animation Studios)
- Jetsons: The Movie (1990, Hanna-Barbera Productions)
- Joseph: King of Dreams (2000, DreamWorks Animation LLC)
- Kleines Arschloch (1997, TFC Trickompany Filmproduktion GmbH)
- The Land Before Time (films VII–XIV) (2000–2016, Universal Animation Studios)
- The Lion King (1994, Walt Disney Feature Animation)
- Leroy & Stitch (2006, Walt Disney Television Animation)
- Lilo & Stitch (2002, Walt Disney Feature Animation)
- The Little Mermaid (1989, Walt Disney Feature Animation)
- The Little Mermaid II: Return to the Sea (2000, Walt Disney Television Animation)
- Mickey Mouse Clubhouse: Mickey's Monster Musical (2015, Disney Television Animation)
- Mulan (1998, Walt Disney Feature Animation)
- Mulan II (2005, Disneytoon Studios)
- My Little Pony: A Charming Birthday (2003, SD Entertainment)
- My Little Pony: Dancing in the Clouds (2004, SD Entertainment)
- My Little Pony: Friends are Never Far Away (2005, SD Entertainment)
- My Little Pony: A Very Minty Christmas (2005, Hasbro Entertainment and SD Entertainment)
- My Little Pony Crystal Princess: The Runaway Rainbow (2006, SD Entertainment)
- My Little Pony: A Very Pony Place (2007, SD Entertainment)
- My Little Pony: Twinkle Wish Adventure (2009, SD Entertainment)
- My Scene Goes Hollywood (2005, Miramax Family)
- Once Upon a Forest (1993, Hanna-Barbera Productions and Harlech Television Cymru/Wales)
- The Pagemaster (1994, Turner Feature Animation)
- Phineas and Ferb (2009–2015) (with Synergy Animation)
  - Phineas and Ferb's Musical Cliptastic Countdown (2009, Disney Television Animation)
  - Phineas and Ferb Christmas Vacation (2009, Disney Television Animation)
  - Phineas and Ferb's Musical Cliptastic Countdown Hosted by Kelly Osbourne (2013, Disney Television Animation)
  - Phineas and Ferb: Mission Marvel (2013, Disney Television Animation)
  - Phineas and Ferb Save Summer (2014, Disney Television Animation)
  - Phineas and Ferb: Star Wars (2014, Disney Television Animation)
  - Phineas and Ferb: Night of the Living Pharmacists (2014, Disney Television Animation)
  - Tales from the Resistance: Back to the 2nd Dimension (2014, Disney Television Animation)
  - Phineas and Ferb: Last Day of Summer (2014, Disney Television Animation)
  - Phineas and Ferb: The O.W.C.A. Files (2015, Disney Television Animation)
- Phineas and Ferb the Movie: Across the 2nd Dimension (2011, Disney Television Animation) (A Disney Channel Original Movie)
- Pippi Longstocking (1997, Nelvana)
- Pound Puppies and the Legend of Big Paw (1988, Carolco Pictures, Atlantic/Kushler-Locke and The Maltese)
- The Prince and the Pauper (1990, Walt Disney Animation Studios)
- The Pumpkin of Nyefar (2004)
- Rover Dangerfield (1991, Hyperion Pictures)
- The Secret of NIMH 2: Timmy to the Rescue (1998, Metro-Goldwyn-Mayer Animation)
- Scooby-Doo! and the Monster of Mexico (2003, Warner Bros. Animation)
- Tarzan & Jane (2002, Walt Disney Television Animation)
- Tarzan (1999, Walt Disney Feature Animation)
- The Thief and the Cobbler (1995, Richard Williams Productions, Fred Calvert Productions and Allied Filmmakers)
- Tom and Jerry: The Movie (1992, Turner Entertainment, Film Roman, and WMG)
- Tom Sawyer (2000, Metro-Goldwyn-Mayer Animation)
- Tron (1982, Walt Disney Productions and Lisberger Studios)
- Winnie the Pooh: A Very Merry Pooh Year (2002, Walt Disney Television Animation)
- Winnie the Pooh: Seasons of Giving (1999, Walt Disney Television Animation)
- Yu Yu Hakusho: Fight for the Netherworld (1994, Pierrot)
- Yu Yu Hakusho: The Movie (1993, Pierrot)
- Zu Warriors from the Magic Mountain (1983, Paragon Films)

=== Others ===
- MGM Sing Alongs (1997)

== CGCG ==
CGCG, Inc.
- Type: Subsidiary
- Industry: Entertainment
- Founded: 1988; 38 years ago
- Headquarters: Taipei City, Taiwan; Shanghai, China; Okinawa, Japan; Tokyo, Japan
- Products: high profile Animated series for SVOD platforms (Netflix, Amazon Prime, etc.), Animated features, VFX for Live action films, DVD movies, Game cinematics.
- Production output: Animation
- Website: www.cgcg.com.tw

CGCG, Inc. is a leading CGI computer animation studio based in Taiwan since 1988.

=== Productions ===
CGCG (Taiwan)

Show	Year(s)	Notes	Client
Xcalibur	2001–02		Ellipsanime (France)
Make Way for Noddy	2001–03		SD Entertainment
Bionicle: Bionicle: Mask of Light (2003); Bionicle 2: Legends of Metru Nui (2004); Bionicle 3: Web of Shadows (2005); Bionicle: The Legend Reborn (2009)	2003–05; 2009	film series	Lego (Denmark)
Tonka Tough Truck Adventures: The Biggest Show on Wheels	2004		SD Entertainment
Alien Racers	2005		SD Entertainment
D.I.C.E.	2005	CG	Xebec
My Friends Tigger & Pooh	2007–10		Walt Disney Television Animation
The Future Is Wild	2007–08		Nelvana (Canada)
Tak and the Power of Juju	2007–09	six episodes	Nickelodeon Animation Studio
Star Wars: The Clone Wars	2008–14		Lucasfilm Animation
The Penguins of Madagascar	2008–09	"Popcorn Panic", "Launchtime", "Happy King Julien Day!", "Kingdom Come"	Nickelodeon Animation Studio; DreamWorks Animation Television
Bob the Builder	2009–12		HIT Entertainment (UK); SD Entertainment
Fanboy & Chum Chum	2009–12		Nickelodeon Animation Studio
Hero Factory	2010–13		Lego (Denmark)
Green Lantern: The Animated Series	2012–13		Warner Bros. Animation
Dragons: Riders of Berk	2012–13	layouts	DreamWorks Animation Television
Lego Star Wars: The Empire Strikes Out	2012		
Beware the Batman	2013–14		Warner Bros. Animation
Teenage Mutant Ninja Turtles	2014–17		Nickelodeon Animation Studio
Star Wars Rebels	2014–18		Lucasfilm Animation
Thunderbirds Are Go	2015–20		ITV Studios (UK)
Dragons: Race to the Edge	2015–18	animation for most episodes; layouts for a few episodes	DreamWorks Animation Television; Netflix
Tales of Arcadia: Trollhunters (2016–18); 3Below (2018–19); Wizards (2020); Trollhunters: Rise of the Titans (2021)	2016–21	layouts and animation	DreamWorks Animation Television; Netflix
Star Wars Resistance	2018		Lucasfilm Animation
Fast & Furious: Spy Racers	2019–21	asset creation and rigging	DreamWorks Animation Television; Universal Pictures; Netflix
Jurassic World Camp Cretaceous	2020–2022		DreamWorks Animation Television; Amblin Entertainment; Universal Pictures; Netflix
Doug Unplugs	2020–2022		DreamWorks Animation Television; Apple TV+
Star Wars: The Bad Batch	2021–2024	production services	Lucasfilm Animation; Disney+
Gabby's Dollhouse	2021–present	production services	DreamWorks Animation Television; Netflix
He-Man and the Masters of the Universe	2021–2022		Mattel Television; Netflix
DreamWorks Dragons: The Nine Realms	2021–2023		DreamWorks Animation Television; Hulu; Peacock
Abominable and the Invisible City	2022–2023		DreamWorks Animation Television; Hulu; Peacock
Star Wars Tales	2022–2025		Lucasfilm Animation; Disney+
Curses!	2023–2024		DreamWorks Animation Television; Sunday Night Productions; Apple TV+
Jurassic World: Chaos Theory	2024–2025		DreamWorks Animation Television; Amblin Entertainment; Universal Pictures; Netflix
Your Friendly Neighborhood Spider-Man	2025–present	with Polygon Pictures	Marvel Studios Animation; Disney+
Bearbrick	2025–present		DreamWorks Animation Television; Dentsu Entertainment; Apple TV+
Star Wars: Maul – Shadow Lord	2026–present		Lucasfilm Animation; Disney+

CGCG (China)

Show	Year(s)	Notes	Client
Pet Alien	2006–07		Taffy Entertainment

CGCG Studio (Japan)

Show	Year(s)	Notes	Client
Mobile Suit Gundam MS IGLOO	2004	"The Howl that Dyed the Setting Sun"	Sunrise
Genki Genki Nontan	2004		
Zoids: Genesis	2005–06	CG	ShoPro
Rockman.EXE Beast	2006		Xebec
Saru Get You -On Air-	2006–07		Xebec
Super Robot Wars Original Generation: Divine Wars	2007	"Bian's Final Will"	OLM, Inc.
Abunai Sisters Koko & Mika	2009	CGI modeling	
Appleseed XIII	2011	motion-capture; production coordination	Production I.G
Blade & Soul	2014	ending animation motion capture	Gonzo
Schwarzesmarken	2016		ixtl/Liden Films
Ajin: Demi-Human	2016	motion-capture assistance	Polygon Pictures
Aikatsu Stars!	2016–18	CGI cooperation	Bandai Namco Pictures
The Master of Ragnarok & Blesser of Einherjar	2018		EMT Squared
The Magnificent Kotobuki	2019	CGI cooperation for episodes 11 and 12	Digital Frontier
Ultraman	2019–2023	rigging assistance	Production I.G; Netflix
Ghost in the Shell: SAC_2045	2020–present	rigging	Production I.G; Netflix
Eden	2021		Qubic Pictures; Netflix

=== Continuations ===
CGCG (Taiwan)

Show	Year(s)	Notes	Client
Donkey Kong Country (Season 2)	1999–2000		Nelvana (Canada)

== Thai Wang Film Productions ==
Thai Wang Film Productions Co., Ltd.
- Industry: Entertainment
- Headquarters: 63/141-142 Cartoon Building Ratanathibet Rd. Bangkasor Nonthaburi 11000; Bangkok, Thailand
- Products: Feature films, television series
- Production output: Animation
- Services: Animation outsourcing
- Owner: Wang Film Productions

Thai Wang Film Productions Co., Ltd. is a division of Wang Film Productions located in Bangkok, Thailand.

=== Productions ===
- Goof Troop (1992) - ink & paint for 6 episodes
- The Thief and the Cobbler (1993, Richard Williams Productions, Fred Calvert Productions and Allied Filmmakers)
- Gargoyles (1994) - "Awakening, Part 2"
- Gargoyles the Movie: The Heroes Awaken (1995) (as Thai Wang Production)
- Timon & Pumbaa (1995–1996)
- Road Rovers (1996)
- Boo to You Too! Winnie the Pooh (1996, Walt Disney Television Animation) (as Thai Wang Film Production Co., Ltd.)
- All Dogs Go to Heaven: The Series (1996–1998)
- Quack Pack (1996) - 2 episodes
- Jungle Cubs (1996)
- Kleines Arschloch (1997, TFC Trickompany Filmproduktion GmbH)
- 101 Dalmatians: The Series (1997–1998) - 13 episodes
- Babes in Toyland (1997, Metro-Goldwyn-Mayer Animation)
- The Adventures of Paddington Bear (1997, CINAR Animation)
- Belle's Magical World (1998, DisneyToon Studios) (as Thai Wang Film Production Co., Ltd.)
- Hercules: The Animated Series (1998) - 5 episodes
- An All Dogs Christmas Carol (1998, Metro-Goldwyn-Mayer Animation)
- Max und Moritz (1999)
- Hercules: Zero to Hero (1999, Disney Television Animation) (as Thai Wang Film Production)
- Detention (1999)
- Dragon Tales (1999) (Season 1)
- Courage the Cowardly Dog (1999)
- Poochini's Yard (2000)
- Heavy Metal 2000 (2000)
- Buzz Lightyear of Star Command (2000)
- What's New, Scooby-Doo? (2002)
- Franklin's Magic Christmas (2001, Nelvana)
- Back to School with Franklin (2003, Nelvana)
- Stuart Little: The Animated Series (2003, Sony Pictures Television and Adelaide Productions)
- The Pumpkin of Nyefar (2004)
- Leroy & Stitch (2006, Disney Television Animation; Digital Production)

== Hong Guang Animation (Suzhou) ==
Hong Guang Animation (Suzhou) Co., Ltd.
- Native name: 宏广动画（苏州）有限公司
- Industry: Entertainment
- Founded: 1996
- Headquarters: No. 137 Bao Dai West Road, Wu Zhong Qu, Su Zhou City, Jiang Su Province, China (P.R.C.)
- Products: Feature films, television series
- Production output: Animation
- Services: Animation outsourcing
- Owner: Wang Film Productions

Hong Guang Animation (Suzhou) Co., Ltd. (simplified Chinese: 宏广动画（苏州）有限公司; traditional Chinese: 宏廣動畫（蘇州）有限公司; pinyin: Hóng Guǎng Dònghuà (Sūzhōu) Yǒuxiàn Gōngsī) is a division of Wang Film Productions located in Suzhou, Jiangsu, China.

=== Productions ===
- Benjamin Blümchen
- Bibi Blocksberg
- Kangoo (Season 2)
- The Adventures of Paddington Bear (1997–2001)
- Loggerheads (1997)
- Princess Sissi (1997–1998)
- Dumb Bunnies (1998–1999)
- Mythic Warriors (1998–2000)
- The Lionhearts (1998)
- George and Martha (1999–2000)
- Rescue Heroes (1999–2000) (Season 1)
- Little Bear (1999–2001) (Season 5)
- Marvin the Tap-Dancing Horse (2000–2002)
- Nick & Perry (2000–2001)
- Timothy Tweedle: The First Christmas Elf (2000, Evening Sky)
- The Legend of Tarzan (2001) (Season 1)
- Sagwa, the Chinese Siamese Cat (2001–2002, as Cuckoo's Nest)
- Gadget & the Gadgetinis (2002–2003)
- Fillmore! (2002) (Season 2)
- My Little Pony: A Charming Birthday (2003, SD Entertainment)
- Winx Club (2004) (Season 1)
- Altair in Starland (2004)
- Zeroman (2004)
- My Little Pony: Dancing in the Clouds (2004, SD Entertainment)
- Candy Land: The Great Lollipop Adventure (2005, SD Entertainment)
- My Little Pony: Friends are Never Far Away (2005, SD Entertainment)
- My Little Pony: A Very Minty Christmas (2005, Hasbro and SD Entertainment)
- Asterix and the Vikings (2006)
- Forest Friends (2006–2007)
- My Little Pony Crystal Princess: The Runaway Rainbow (2006, SD Entertainment)
- My Little Pony: A Very Pony Place (2007, SD Entertainment)
- Care Bears: Adventures in Care-a-lot (2007–2008)
- Ni Hao, Kai-Lan (2007–2008) (Season 1)
- Tutenstein: Clash of the Pharaohs (2008)
- My Little Pony: Twinkle Wish Adventure (2009, SD Entertainment)

== Cuckoos' Nest Studio ==
Cuckoo's Nest Studios
- Industry: Animation
- Founded: 1978
- Products: TBA
- Production output: Animation
- Services: TBA
- Owner: Wang Film Productions

Cuckoo's Nest Studios is a subsidiary of Wang Film Productions.

=== Productions ===
- Generation O! (2000-2001, Sunbow Entertainment)

== See also ==
- List of animation studios
- List of companies of Taiwan
- List of companies of Thailand
- Rough Draft Korea
- Top Draw Animation
- Mercury Filmworks
