= Cold Moon (2016 film) =

- Film poster
- Directed by: Griff Furst
- Written by: Griff Furst; Jack Snyder
- Starring: Josh Stewart; Candy Clark; Frank Whaley; Robbie Kay; Christopher Lloyd
- Cinematography: Thomas L. Callaway
- Edited by: Griff Furst
- Music by: Nathan Furst
- Release dates: May 27, 2016 (Madrid International Fantastic Film Festival); October 6, 2017 (wide release)
- Running time: 92 minutes
- Country: United States
- Language: English

Cold Moon is a 2016 horror drama based on Michael McDowell’s 1980 novel Cold Moon Over Babylon. It stars Josh Stewart and Christopher Lloyd. The film was released on 27 October 2016.

== Synopsis ==
In the tiny town of Babylon, Florida, sixteen-year-old Margaret Larkin (Sara Catherine Bellamy) goes missing, only to be found murdered and thrown in the river, tied to her bicycle. The town is enveloped by the mystery of a killer in their midst; meanwhile, the killer himself, Nathan Redfield (Josh Stewart), sociopathic son of a prominent town banker (Christopher Lloyd), proceeds with his scheme to murder the rest of the Larkin family in order for the bank to acquire the Larkin's valuable, petroleum-rich property. Nathan additionally schemes to pin blame for the murders on the high school principal (Marcus Lyle Brown). The Larkin family members, however, return from the grave to exact revenge against Nathan, although he is the only one who can see these phantasms. Nathan's seeming hallucinations and drinking escalate until he finally snaps and gets his comeuppance.

== Cast ==
- Josh Stewart as Nathan Redfield
- Sara Catherine Bellamy as Margaret Larkin
- Candy Clark as Evelyn Larkin
- Frank Whaley as Sheriff Ted Hale
- Rachele Brooke Smith as Belinda Hale
- Robbie Kay as Ben Redfield
- Christopher Lloyd as James Redfield
- Madison Wolfe as Mandy
- Chester Rushing as Jerry Larkin
- Marcus Lyle Brown as Walter Perry
- Joe Chrest as Charles Darrish
- Laura Cayouette as Ginny Darrish
- Tommy Wiseau as Rodeo Official

== Reception ==
On Rotten Tomatoes, the film holds an approval rating of 73% based on 11 reviews, with a weighted average rating of 5.9/10.
