= Need for Speed (film) =

2014 film by Scott Waugh

- Theatrical release poster
- Directed by: Scott Waugh
- Screenplay by: George Gatins
- Story by: George Gatins; John Gatins
- Based on: Need for Speed by Electronic Arts
- Produced by: John Gatins; Patrick O'Brien; Mark Sourian
- Starring: Aaron Paul; Dominic Cooper; Scott Mescudi; Imogen Poots; Ramón Rodríguez; Michael Keaton
- Cinematography: Shane Hurlbut
- Edited by: Paul Rubell; Scott Waugh
- Music by: Nathan Furst
- Production companies: DreamWorks Pictures; Reliance Entertainment; Electronic Arts; Bandito Brothers
- Distributed by: Walt Disney Studios Motion Pictures (Note: Distributed through the Touchstone Pictures banner.) (North America and select international territories); Reliance Distribution (India); Mister Smith Entertainment (International)
- Release dates: March 7, 2014 (TCL Chinese Theatre); March 14, 2014 (United States)
- Running time: 130 minutes
- Countries: United States; India
- Language: English
- Budget: $66 million
- Box office: $203.3 million

Need for Speed is a 2014 action crime film based on the racing video game series, directed by Scott Waugh, and starring Aaron Paul, Dominic Cooper, Scott Mescudi, Imogen Poots, Ramón Rodríguez and Michael Keaton. It tells the story of street racer Tobey Marshall, who sets off to race cross-country as a way of avenging his friend's death at the hands of a rival racer, Dino Brewster. The film received negative reviews and grossed $203 million worldwide against a production budget of $66 million.

== Plot ==
Tobey Marshall is a former race car driver who owns his late father's garage, Marshall Performance Motors, in Mount Kisco, New York, where he and his friends tune performance cars. Struggling to make ends meet, he and his crew participate in street races after hours. Pete has a vision of Toby winning the De Leon, a high-stakes supercar street race run by the reclusive radio host Monarch. After a race, Tobey's former rival Dino Brewster conscripts them into completing the build of a rare Ford Shelby Mustang worked on by the late Carroll Shelby, in exchange for 25% of the car's sales revenue. The completed Mustang is displayed for auction at a party in New York City. Tobey and Dino meet Julia Maddon, an English car broker whose client, Bill Ingram, wants to purchase the car if they can prove it will drive over 230 mph, as Tobey claims. Despite Dino's objections that he wanted to test drive it, Tobey takes the Mustang to a local race track and successfully drives it at 234 mph, convincing Ingram to purchase it for $2.7 million.

Enraged by Tobey's disobedience to his objections, Dino challenges Tobey and his friend Pete to a race after Pete flatly tells Dino that everyone knows Tobey is a better driver than him. Dino offers to relinquish his entire share of the Mustang sale if Tobey wins, otherwise Tobey will have to forfeit his share. He challenges them to race with his uncle's three Koenigsegg Agera R cars illegally imported from Europe. On the home stretch, realizing he is about to lose the race, Dino intentionally rams into Pete's car, sending it down a ravine and killing Pete as it bursts into flames. Dino disappears from the scene, while Tobey is arrested by the police and sentenced to two years in prison for involuntary manslaughter, unable to prove Dino was there.

Upon his release on parole, Tobey sets out to avenge Pete's death. He borrows Ingram's Mustang to enter the De Leon, but as a condition, Ingram requires Julia to accompany Tobey while he is driving the Mustang. The pair have 45 hours to reach San Francisco before the race starts. In Detroit, they cause an interstate chase with the Michigan State Police and upload the footage. Dino offers his rare Lamborghini Sesto Elemento to anyone who can stop Tobey from entering the race, causing a group of truckers to go after the Mustang as well. Julia retaliates by convincing Monarch of Tobey's innocence, securing his invitation to the De Leon.

In Utah, Tobey and Julia are ambushed by the truckers, forcing them off the road. Benny, a member of Tobey's crew, appears in a military helicopter stolen from the National Guard, and carries the Mustang mid-air to Tobey's crew at the Bonneville Salt Flats, getting himself arrested in the process. Tobey and Julia reach San Francisco's Mark Hopkins Hotel in time to register for the race, but on Nob Hill, a tow truck operated by one of Dino's henchmen smashes into the Mustang, wrecking it and injuring Julia. Desperate to get another car for the race, Tobey meets his ex-girlfriend and Pete's sister, Anita, who is now Dino's fiancée. Having discovered Dino's involvement in Pete's death, Anita gives Tobey the location of Dino's hidden Koenigsegg, which Tobey and crew member Joe extract. Tobey meets Julia at a San Francisco hospital, confessing his feelings for her with a kiss and letting her know that he has a "fast" car, and that this is for Pete.

The next morning, Tobey surprises Dino by not only showing up in the red Koenigsegg he drove when Pete was killed, but also giving him Anita's engagement ring, informing Dino that she is through with him. In the ensuing race along the Pacific Coast Highway, the racers and pursuing California Highway Patrol officers crash one-by-one, leaving Tobey and Dino racing side-by-side. Dino attempts to ram Tobey the same way he killed Pete, but Tobey dodges, causing Dino to crash and flip over. Tobey pulls Dino from the wreckage, punches Dino to avenge Pete, and proceeds to finish the race, after which both men are apprehended by the police, with Dino eventually convicted of the murder of Pete.

178 days later, Tobey is released, and Julia meets him at the prison gates in a 2015 Ford Mustang. The couple drives to a prison in Utah, where Benny is getting released early for good behavior.

== Cast ==
- Aaron Paul as Tobey Marshall, a blue-collar mechanic and skilled former racing driver from Mount Kisco, New York who is framed for a federal crime he did not commit.
- Dominic Cooper as Dino Brewster, a former Indy racer and Tobey's fierce rival.
- Imogen Poots as Julia Maddon, a savvy exotic car broker, who becomes Tobey's love interest.
- Scott Mescudi as Sergeant Benny "Maverick" Jackson, a member of Tobey's crew, and a former National Guard soldier. He is a pilot, able to fly small aeroplanes and helicopters, and is often called "Liar One" because fellow crew members do not believe he can fly a military helicopter, which he later proves. He owns a Cessna 182.
- Ramon Rodriguez as Joe "Beasty" Peck, a member of Tobey's crew. He is the crew's professional mechanic, and drives a modified 2011 Ford F-450 called "The Beast".
- Rami Malek as Finn, a member of Tobey's crew. He serves as the crew's computer expert, monitoring cameras to record races.
- Michael Keaton as "Monarch", a reclusive and eccentric host of an "underground" supercar race competition, De Leon. He operates from a lighthouse on a small farm where he lives.
- Dakota Johnson as Anita Coleman, Pete's older sister, Tobey's former girlfriend and Dino's fiancée.
- Harrison Gilbertson as Pete Coleman, Anita's younger brother and Tobey's protégé and friend.

== Production ==
=== Development ===
In July 2012, DreamWorks Studios was committed to a film based on the Need for Speed series of video games by Electronic Arts, initially with a release date of February 7, 2014, and later March 14, 2014. Brothers George and John Gatins had written a script that was being shipped to studios by April of that year. Taylor Kitsch was offered the lead role in July 2012, though the role eventually went to Aaron Paul that October. Paul had originally auditioned for the role of Dino Brewster, although director Scott Waugh and DreamWorks head Steven Spielberg decided against that and cast him as the lead. The same month, Imogen Poots was cast as the female lead. In January 2013, Dominic Cooper, Scott Mescudi, Ramón Rodríguez, Rami Malek and Harrison Gilbertson were cast in the film. Michael Keaton was cast in February 2013.

=== Filming ===
Principal photography began in Macon, Georgia, in mid-April 2013. Other filming locations include Road Atlanta in Braselton, Georgia, on May 12, 2013, the 13th Street Bridge in Columbus, Georgia and Phenix City, Alabama, and Campus Martius in Detroit, Michigan, beginning on June 1, 2013. Other production locations include sections of California's Highway 1 north of Point Arena, the Point Arena Lighthouse, and Highway 253 between Boonville and Ukiah; and also Highway 128, between the town of Navarro and the Navarro Bridge linking Highway 128 North to Highway 1 South to Point Arena.

For the film's chase sequences, the filmmakers decided against the use of computer-generated imagery, instead employing practical effects, which required the cast to receive intensive driving lessons. All of the exotic cars seen in the film (with the exception of the Mercedes-Benz SLR McLaren 722 Roadster) were kit car replicas.

=== Soundtrack ===
Need for Speed

Film score by Nathan Furst
- Released: March 14, 2014
- Genre: Film score
- Length: 1:10:34
- Label: Varèse Sarabande

Nathan Furst chronology
Need for Speed (2014)	Bionicle: Mask of Light (2017)

The film's soundtrack, composed by Nathan Furst, was released by Varèse Sarabande on March 14, 2014. Interscope Records released a separate EP on April 8, 2014, which featured four songs; "Fortunate Son" and "Back in the Saddle" by Aloe Blacc, "All Along the Watchtower" by Jamie N Commons, and "Hero" by Kid Cudi featuring Skylar Grey. Linkin Park's song "Roads Untraveled" from their 2012 album Living Things was also featured in the film.

Track listing
No.	Title	Length
1.	"Marshall Motors"	2:30
2.	"Lighthouse"	1:26
3.	"Mt. Kisco"	4:48
4.	"Mustang Offer"	1:45
5.	"Identical Ageras"	2:03
6.	"Koenigsegg Race"	2:06
7.	"Pete's Death"	4:01
8.	"Right Seater"	2:10
9.	"You Always Go Back"	3:43
10.	"Motor City Mayhem"	2:10
11.	"Grasshopper"	1:43
12.	"Hot Fuel"	5:15
13.	"Crazy Little Tart"	5:18
14.	"Switching Seats"	1:55
15.	"Utah Escape"	3:56
16.	"California Crossing"	3:41
17.	"Broken"	6:27
18.	"De Leon Begins"	7:03
19.	"Lethal Force"	4:26
20.	"In the Lead"	4:33
Total length:		01:10:34

== Marketing and release ==
Need for Speed sponsored prototype at the 2014 12 Hours of Sebring

On September 25, 2013, a trailer for the film was released on iTunes. Disney and DreamWorks Pictures announced the film's post-production conversion to 3D on February 5, 2014. Need for Speed held its world premiere at the TCL Chinese Theatre on March 7, 2014. The film was released by Walt Disney Studios Motion Pictures under the Touchstone Pictures label on March 14, 2014, in selected 3D, IMAX, 4DX and 2D theaters. It was also released worldwide by Disney except in certain international territories, where the rights are sold by Mister Smith Entertainment to other distributors. Reliance Distribution had released the film in India, while Entertainment One released it in the United Kingdom.

The video game Need for Speed Rivals released downloadable content (DLC) on March 11, 2014 which added cars that appeared in the movie to the game.

=== Home media ===
Need for Speed was released by Touchstone Home Entertainment on Blu-ray, DVD and Blu-ray 3D on August 5, 2014.

== Reception ==
=== Box office ===
Need for Speed grossed $43.6 million in North America and $159.7 million in other countries, for a worldwide total of $203.3 million.

In North America, it topped the box office with $6.7 million on its opening Friday, March 14, 2014. However, the film finished in third place over the three-day weekend with $17.8 million. Outside North America, the film debuted in first place with $45.6 million on the same weekend as its North America release. It remained in first place for a second weekend. Overall, the film's largest territory is China, where both the film's opening weekend ($21.1 million) and its total earnings ($66.2 million) are higher than in North America. Following these two territories in total earnings is Russia and the CIS with $13.8 million.

=== Critical response ===
On Rotten Tomatoes, the film has an approval rating of 23% based on 186 reviews and an average rating of 4.3/10. The site's critical consensus reads, "With stock characters and a preposterous plot, this noisily diverting video game adaptation fulfills a Need for Speed and little else." On Metacritic, the film has a score of 39 out of 100 based on 38 critics, indicating "generally unfavorable reviews". Audiences polled by CinemaScore gave the film an average grade of "B+" on an A+ to F scale.

Michael Phillips of the Chicago Tribune gave the film 2.5 out of 4 stars, remarking that "Paul has talent, though the actor's idea of simmering intensity in the context of Need for Speed comes off more like a serial killer in the making. Cooper, by contrast, seems to be having some fun playing a dashing, dastardly, sexy beast." Phillips added, "At its occasional best, the thrills in the film recall the delirious fun of the Fast & Furious franchise." Betsy Sharkey of Los Angeles Times felt similarly, writing "In trying for the vicarious varoom of the street-racing video game that inspired it, and no doubt dreaming of Fast success, Speed clocks in at a long two-plus hours and falls painfully short." Jason Torchinsky of the automotive blog Jalopnik criticized the movie for insulting gearheads with its far-reaching suspension of disbelief on many plot points and tropes and stated the film was nothing more than a glorified car commercial for the 2015 Ford Mustang.

Danny Korecki of automotive outlet The Drive discussed the thought that the Need for Speed film may have been better had it been a TV series.

A.O. Scott of The New York Times gave a more positive review, praising the film's car chase sequences, while declaring the overall film "an energetic, unpretentious B movie".

== See also ==
- List of films based on video games
