= Henry Gilroy =

American screenwriter and producer (born 1976)

- Gilroy at Dragon Con in 2026
- Born: Henry Alan Gilroy; Los Angeles, California, U.S.
- Occupations: Author; screenwriter; producer
- Years active: 1992–present

Henry Alan Gilroy is an American film and television screenwriter and producer. He is best known for co-writing the animated series Star Wars: The Clone Wars.

== Early life ==
From an early age, Gilroy loved comic books and animation which inspired him to study film at several colleges in the greater Los Angeles area.

== Career ==
His first job at a Hollywood studio was working as an editor for Warner Bros.' animation department working Steven Spielberg's Tiny Toon Adventures. It was at Warner Bros. that Gilroy sold his first script to the producers of the Emmy winning Batman: The Animated Series, for the Scarecrow episode, "Nothing to Fear". After a staff writer gig on the WB's Tazmanian Devil animated series, Tazmania, Gilroy moved on to work on The Tick animated series before taking a staff job at Disney Television Animation for several years where he worked on such series as Timon & Pumbaa, Mickey Mouse Works, House of Mouse, Lilo & Stitch: The Series and Super Robot Monkey Team Hyperforce Go! before being chosen to develop and write the Star Wars: The Clone Wars CG animated series for Lucasfilm Animation with creator George Lucas and director Dave Filoni. He served as head writer for season one and part of season two, penning several episodes, including the first stories featuring fan favorite character Ahsoka Tano, among others. He is also the author of several Star Wars comic books.

Leaving Lucasfilm, Gilroy spent two years at Hasbro Studios, where he developed and led the writing on two other animated series, G.I. Joe: Renegades and Kaijudo, and then moved on to Marvel Animation Studios where he acted as supervising producer and head writer on Hulk and the Agents of S.M.A.S.H. and Ultimate Spider-Man as well as penning two CG Marvel Heroes United films featuring team-ups with Iron Man & the Hulk and Iron Man & Captain America. Upon finishing series work on Hulk and Ultimate Spider-man, Gilroy teamed with frequent collaborator, Marty Isenberg to develop and co-write the pilot for The Guardians of the Galaxy animated series.

Gilroy is co-creator of the first Bionicle trilogy and has since written for numerous other animated series, such as The Mask, Justice League Unlimited, The 99, Kim Possible, and the direct-to-video Disney movie title Atlantis: Milo's Return and the Funimation anime film Mass Effect: Paragon Lost based on the hit video game for Electronic Arts and BioWare.

Gilroy wrote the four-issue Joker/Mask comic book which was collected by Dark Horse/DC Comics in 2001. He also wrote the Dark Horse Alien one-shot comic books, Aliens: Herk Mondo and Aliens: Mondo Heat in collaboration with artist and Pixar director Ronnie del Carmen.

In 2014, Gilroy returned to Lucasfilm under Disney studios to serve as co-executive producer and series writer of Star Wars Rebels where he wrote seventeen episodes through 2018. Gilroy received two Emmy nominations for his work and won two Saturn Awards respectively.

In 2019, Gilroy was selected as the showrunner/head writer for an animated Magic: The Gathering TV show for Netflix with the Russo brothers.

In 2020, Gilroy began working on DreamWorks Dragons: The Nine Realms, an animated television series for DreamWorks Animation.

== Television and film credits ==
=== Television ===
Year	Title	Credit(s)	Notes
1992	Batman: The Animated Series	Episode: "Nothing to Fear"	
1993	2 Stupid Dogs	Segment: "Space Dogs"	
1994	The Tick	Episodes: "The Tick vs. The Uncommon Cold", "The Tick vs. The Proto-Clown"	
1994	Taz-Mania		
1994	The Baby Huey Show	Episodes: "A Dog Days Night?", "Duck Huey Duck", "Superhero Huey"	
1995	The Mask: Animated Series	Episodes: "Sister Mask", "Double Reverse", "All Hallow's Eve", "Mystery Cruise"	
1995	Earthworm Jim	Episode: "Trout!"	
1995–1996	The Savage Dragon	Episodes: "Possession", "She-Dragon", "Armageddon", "Ceasefire", "Femme Fatale"	
1996	The Mouse and the Monster	Episodes: "A Mouse, a Monster & a Baby", "H.M.O. Mo", "Sleep Tight"	
1997	The Wacky World of Tex Avery	Episode: "Rodeo, Rodeo, Where for Art Thou Rodeo?"	
1998	All Dogs Go to Heaven: The Series	Episode: "History of All Dogs"	
1999	Timon & Pumbaa	Episodes: "Lemonade Stand Off", "Super Hog-O", "Don't Have the Vegas Idea", "Don't Wake the Neighbear", "Timoncchio"	
1999	Sherlock Holmes in the 22nd Century	Episode: "The Adventure of the Deranged Detective"	
2001	Jackie Chan Adventures	Episode: "Origami"	
2002	Teamo Supremo	Episodes: "Grounded!", "Capitol Offense!", "Running the Gauntlet!", "Enter Dr. 'Droid!"	
2002	House of Mouse	Episodes: "The Three Caballeros", "Rent Day", "Donald's Pumbaa Prank", "Pluto Saves the Day", "The Mouse Who Came to Dinner", "Max's New Car", "Donald and the Aracuan Bird", "Donald Wants to Fly", "House of Turkey", "Pete's House of Villains", "Halloween with Hades", "House of Genius"	
2003	Lilo & Stitch: The Series	Episodes: "Phantasmo", "Yin-Yang", "Splodyhead", "627", "Slushy", "Short Stuff", "Bonnie & Clyde"	
2004	Justice League Unlimited	Episode: "Kids' Stuff"	
2006	Super Robot Monkey Team Hyperforce Go!	Episodes: "Chiro's Girl", "The Sun Riders", "Skeleton King", "Shadow Over Shuggazoom", "Snowbound", "The Skeleton King Threat", "I, Chiro", "The Savage Lands", "Brother in Arms"	
2007	Kim Possible	Episode: "The Mentor of Our Discontent"	
2008–2010	Star Wars: The Clone Wars	Episodes: "Duel of the Droids", "Bombad Jedi", "Lair of Grevious", "Storm Over Ryloth", "Innocents of Ryloth", "Liberty on Ryloth", "Children of the Force", "Kidnapped", "Slaves of the Republic", "Escape from Kadavo"	
2008-09	Transformers: Animated	Episodes: "Sound and Fury", "Human Error" (Part 1)	
2009	The Secret Saturdays	Episode: "Curse of the Stolen Roger"	
2010–2011	G.I. Joe: Renegades	Episode: "The Descent (Parts 1 & 2)"	
2012	Iron Man: Armored Adventures	Episode: "Mandarin's Quest"	
2012	Action Dad		
2012	Kaijudo: Rise of the Duel Masters	Episodes: "The Natural", "Like Father, Like Son", "The Rising (Parts 1 & 2)"	
2012	Voltron Force	Episode: "I, Voltron"	
2013–2015	Hulk and the Agents of S.M.A.S.H.	Episodes: "Hulk Busted", "Into the Negative Zone", "Deathlok", "Planet Leader (Part 2)", "Guardians of the Galaxy", "Spidey, I Blew up the Dinosaur", "Wheels of Fury"	
2014	Teenage Mutant Ninja Turtles	Episodes: "Plan 10", "Clash of the Mutanimals", "Kagayake! Kintaro"	
2014-16	Ultimate Spider-Man	Episodes: "The Vulture", "Return to the Spider-Verse, Part 3", "Strange Little Halloween"	
2014–2018	Star Wars Rebels	Episodes: "Rise of the Old Masters", "Empire Day", "Vision of Hope", "Rebel Resolve", "The Siege of Lothal", "Legacy", "The Protector of Concord Dawn", "Shroud of Darkness", "The Holocrons of Fate", "Through Imperial Eyes", "Twin Suns", "Zero Hour", "Heroes of Mandalore", "Kindred", "Jedi Night", "A Fool's Hope", Short: "Entanglement"	
2017-19	Avengers Assemble	Episodes: "The Sleeper Awakens", "The Most Dangerous Hunt", "House of M"	
2017-19	Guardians of the Galaxy	Episodes: "Won't Get Fooled Again", "Knights in Black Helmets", "It's Tricky", "Gotta Get Outta This Place", "Holding Out for a Hero"	
2021–2023	DreamWorks Dragons: The Nine Realms		

== Film ==
Year	Title	Credit(s)	Notes
2002	Mickey's House of Villains		
2003	Atlantis: Milo’s Return		
2003	Bionicle: Mask of Light		
2004	Bionicle 2: Legends of Metru Nui		
2005	Bionicle 3: Web of Shadows		
2008	Star Wars: The Clone Wars		
2012	Mass Effect: Paragon Lost		
2013–2014	Heroes United		
