= Bionicle: Mask of Light =

2003 American animated film by David Molina

- Directed by: Terry Shakespeare; David Molina
- Written by: Alastair Swinnerton; Henry Gilroy; Greg Weisman
- Produced by: Sue Shakespeare; Janice Ross; Stig Blicher
- Starring: Andrew Francis; Scott McNeil; Dale Wilson; Kathleen Barr; Lee Tockar
- Edited by: Craig Russo
- Music by: Nathan Furst
- Production companies: Miramax Home Entertainment; The Lego Group; Create TV & Film; Creative Capers Entertainment; CGCG
- Distributed by: Buena Vista Home Entertainment
- Release dates: September 13, 2003 (Legoland); September 16, 2003 (United States)
- Running time: 70 minutes
- Countries: Denmark; United States
- Language: English
- Budget: $3.5-5 million

Bionicle: Mask of Light, stylized as BIONICLE: Mask of Light — The Movie, is a 2003 animated science fantasy action film based on the Bionicle toyline by Lego, and particularly serves as a direct adaptation to the latter half of the toyline's 2003 narrative. Set in a universe filled with bio-mechanical beings allied with classical element-themed tribes, the story follows two friends from the fire-based village of Ta-Koro on a quest to find the owner of the Mask of Light, a mystical artifact that can potentially defeat Makuta, an evil entity threatening the island.

The project was first proposed in 2001, during the original run of the Bionicle toyline. Lego contacted multiple writers for the project, including original Bionicle contributors Bob Thompson and Alastair Swinnerton, and Hollywood writers Henry Gilroy and Greg Weisman. Production began in 2002, taking approximately a year to complete. A major part of the graphical design was adjusting the characters so they could work in human-like ways while still resembling the original toys. The music was composed by Nathan Furst, who used orchestral and tribal elements to create the score. Voice casting was handled by Kris Zimmerman, and the voicework was done with the setting and mythos of Bionicle in mind.

Multiple studios were involved in the development and distribution of Mask of Light: it was co-produced by Lego and Create TV & Film, developed by Creative Capers Entertainment and CGCG, and post-production was handled by 310 Studios and Hacienda Post. It was released on September 16, 2003, on home video and DVD by Buena Vista Home Entertainment under the Miramax Home Entertainment label. Upon release, the film reached high positions in VHS and DVD charts, and received generally positive reviews from journalists. Mask of Light was followed by two prequel films, Bionicle 2: Legends of Metru Nui in 2004 and Bionicle 3: Web of Shadows in 2005, and a stand-alone sequel, Bionicle: The Legend Reborn, in 2009.

== Plot ==
On a tropical island, Mata Nui, in the Bionicle universe, the Great Spirit Mata Nui created the island's masked Matoran inhabitants. Mata Nui was sent into a coma by his envious spirit brother Makuta, who began a reign of terror over the island. His reign ended when six guardians, known as Toa, freed the island from his regime. The Matoran, alongside the Toa and Turaga leaders, live in Element-themed regions of the island.

Two Matoran from the fire village of Ta-Koro, Jaller and Takua, discover a Great Kanohi, a Toa mask imbued with Elemental power, in a cave, and Takua is rescued from a lava wave by the Fire Toa Tahu. The two Matoran later participate in a multi-tribal game of Kohlii, the island's national sport; the match reveals developing tensions between Tahu and the Water Toa Gali. At the end of the match, the Mask is accidentally revealed, and the Turaga recognizes its powers. They announce that it heralds the arrival of a seventh Toa, a Toa of Light, destined to defeat Makuta and awaken Mata Nui. Guided by the Mask, Jaller and Takua are sent to find the Seventh Toa, Jaller being believed to be the Seventh Toa's herald.

Makuta senses the mask's presence and sends three Rahkshi, beings born from pieces of his own essence, to retrieve it. The Rahkshi subsequently invades and destroys Ta-Koro during their search. Tahu is poisoned during the assault, which makes his behavior increasingly erratic and further strains his relationship with Gali.

During their journey, Jaller and Takua receive aid from the Air Toa Lewa and the Ice Toa Kopaka, the latter of whom temporarily immobilizes the Rakhshi by trapping them in a frozen lake. En route to the Earth village of Onu-Koro, Takua wanders away from Jaller and is confronted by Makuta, who threatens to kill Jaller and the rest of the island's inhabitants unless Takua brings him the Mask; Takua then abandons Jaller in an attempt to shield him. Makuta then releases three more Rakhshi, who attack Onu-Koro as Takua arrives. Tahu, Kopaka, Lewa and Gali arrive to help the Earth Toa Onua and the Stone Toa Pohatu. Tahu is further corrupted during the battle and goes insane, forcing the Toa to subdue him and flee.

Realizing that the Rahkshi were after him, Takua decides to rejoin Jaller. Gali and the other Toa purge the Rakhshi poison from Tahu, resulting in his reconciliation with Gali and the Toa renewing their unity.

Arriving at Kini Nui, a great temple at the island's center, Jaller and Takua are confronted by all six Rahkshi. The six Toa mount a united offensive and defeat five of them, but the surviving Rahkshi attacks Takua, and Jaller sacrifices himself to protect his friend. His final words prompt Takua to don the Mask of Light; the Mask transforms him into Takanuva, the Toa of Light.

Defeating the final Rahkshi, he constructs a craft powered by Kraata, the worm-like creatures inside the Rahkshi, to guide him to Makuta. Traveling to his lair beneath Mata Nui, the two hold a Kohlii contest to decide the island's fate. At Takanuva's bidding, the Toa, Turaga, and Matoran gather together in the chamber and witness Takanuva merging with Makuta to form a single powerful being.

With Takanuva's willpower dominant, the being raises a gate leading deeper beneath the island, through which the gathered people flee. The being also revives Jaller before the gate collapses on top of it. The Turagas proceed to awaken Mata Nui using the Mask of Light, which in turn revives Takanuva. Takanuva and the group discover the long-dormant city of Metru Nui, the Matoran's original home.

== Characters ==
- Jason Michas as Takua/Takanuva. Portrayed as an inquisitive Ta-Matoran, he is a disguised Av-Matoran (Matoran of Light) destined to become the Toa of Light.
- Andrew Francis as Jaller, the Captain of Ta-Koro's Guard, who is designated as the Herald of the Seventh Toa.
- Scott McNeil as Tahu, the hotheaded yet selfless Toa of Fire; Onua, the quiet and patient Toa of Earth; and Graalok the Ash Bear, a beast from Lewa's domain.
- Dale Wilson as Lewa, the playful and daredevil Toa of Air; and Turaga Onewa, leader of the Po-Matoran.
- Kathleen Barr as Gali, the noble and caring Toa of Water.
- Lee Tockar as the Makuta, the main antagonist; Takutanuva, a being created from the merging of Takanuva and Makuta; and Pewku, Jaller's pet racing crab.
- Christopher Gaze as Turaga Vakama, the leader of the Ta-Matoran.
- Lesley Ewen as Turaga Nokama, the leader of the Ga-Matoran.
- Michael Dobson as Kopaka, the aloof and stoic Toa of Ice; Hewkii, a Po-Matoran Kohlii player.
- Trevor Devall as Pohatu, the brave and cheerful Toa of Stone.
- Chiara Zanni as Hahli, a Ga-Matoran.
- Doc Harris as Kohlii announcer.
- Julian B. Wilson as the Ta-Matoran Guard, and the Rahkshi (vocal effects), mechanical "sons" of Makuta driven by fragments of his being.

== Production ==
The concept for a film based on the Bionicle toyline was proposed as early as 2001, when Bionicle became an unexpected commercial success for Lego: this idea was originally inspired by the fact that Lego advertised Bionicle as if it were a movie, and they had received inquiry emails and licensing requests from multiple film studios. Deciding to make the film while retaining full creative control, Lego began discussing with potential partners, knowing that the film needed to come out while Bionicle was still looming large in the public consciousness. Lego's eventual partner was production entity Create TV & Film. With the initial partnership set up, Lego created some development assets and went round various animation studios to find one that would develop the film. They narrowed it down to two studios, one of which was Creative Capers Entertainment. Creative Capers convinced Lego to employ them after producing a well-received short animated segment featuring Lewa. Creative Caper's three principles, directors Terry Shakespeare and David Molina, and producer Sue Shakespeare, all took up their respective roles for the film's production. The deal was reportedly worth $5 million. In a later interview, Shakespeare referred to the film's aesthetic as "primary colors that were coded to the areas", saying it had a "younger feel" when compared to its prequel. He also referred to the film as "very intimate, very organic".

The film began full production in 2002. While most projects of its type took 18–24 months to complete, the development team completed the film in 13 months. The project's budget was later estimated as being between $3.5 to $5 million. In addition to Creative Capers, Taiwanese studio CGCG created most of the animation: at the time, overseas outsourcing was a rarity for CGI films. By the end of production, the film ran to 77 minutes of raw footage. At this stage, 310 Studios was brought in to handle post production, which mostly entailed cutting the film's length down by 7 minutes. According to 310 Studios president Billy Jones, the hardest part of this was deciding which pieces needed to be cut, as they were impressed with everything that had been produced. 310 Studios also created the opening title and ending credit sequences. Lego also partnered with Miramax to distribute the film, along with developing a future full feature-length theatrical film. Miramax's then-parent Disney was also involved with some of the production and release of the film. Terry Shakespeare said in a later interview that Disney may have recommended Lego to choose Creative Capers as animation partners because of their previous work with the company.

Five different people were involved in the creation of the film's story and script: executive producer Bob Thompson, original Bionicle co-creators and writers Alastair Swinnerton and Martin Riber Andersen, and Hollywood writers Henry Gilroy and Greg Weisman. The script-writing process began in 2002. Gilroy became involved after a meeting with Thompson, and enjoyed working on the script as he greatly admired the Bionicle mythos. Two draft scripts were originally created to see who would write the better script: one by Swinnerton, and one from Gilroy. Due to time constraints, the Gilroy script was accepted with some of Swinnerton's ideas included. Gilroy's most difficult task was creating the dialogue for the Toa: he needed to take into account Thompson's own interpretations, and what the majority of fans thought they should sound like. In the end, he attempted to stay true to original portrayals while giving the voice actors something unique to work with. He also needed to balance their portrayals and screentime, as each of the six needed a chance to shine. The script went through eight different drafts before the final version, although this was far less than Gilroy was used to seeing on other projects. During planning stages, a lot of time was devoted to how characters interacted with each other: cited examples were Lewa's style of speaking, and Kopaka's stoic behaviour. These traits were accentuated for the film to give the characters more distinction and depth. He also needed to avoid putting in out-of-context pop culture references, which would not fit into the setting of Bionicle. As part of the world and character development, expressions and exclamations unique to the world were created: a cited example is Jaller saying "You could have been Lava-Bones" when Takua narrowly escapes being killed by a flood of lava.

=== Design ===
The characters of Bionicle had been portrayed in various ways across multiple media, including the official comics, Flash animations used for online videos, and CGI commercials for the sets. The team decided to use the models from the CGI commercials as their working base for the film models. Before commencing with designing the characters, the team went to Lego's Denmark headquarters and received lessons in the Bionicle design process. The team were originally not going to alter the characters that much, but they needed them to be emotive, which necessitated a redesign. The first step in creating the character models was redrawing the skeleton, then adding muscle pods that would interweave with the skeleton: the muscle gave the characters a more textured appearance, and were added to the shoulders, calves, abdomen and chest cavity. Each character was given a "heart light", a pulsating light in their chest which would fluctuate even when the character was stationary in-shot. They also adjusted the eyes, making the sockets shallower than on the sets and giving them a pupil-like glow. While redesigning the Toa, the team consulted with the original Lego staff to determine what materials the characters were made of: the muscles were compared to rubber, the bones described as a mesh of titanium alloy and carbon fibre, while the armour was made of Kevlar. In general, the outer shells remained mostly unchanged from the sets, although the visible gears were removed and armour was fitted to their backs. The Toa were also bulked up a little when compared to their sets so their feats would be believable for viewers.

Several external features were redesigned for the film, including the introduction of a movable mouth to allow for a more human character, and a four-pronged mechanical tongue to make them look less like dolls. Other characters used lights behind their masks to form mouth movement. Particular emphasis was placed on the eyebrows and lips of characters. The main change from the original models was the inclusion of hands, which was a necessity if the character performances were to be made realistic. Custom texture maps were created for each character so they would appear unique. In addition to reinventing old characters, the team created original character designs with Lego staff. Makuta, who had only been briefly glimpsed in the comics and web animations, was created through a "Frankenstein principle", taking parts and pieces from multiple Bionicle sets to create the ultimate Bionicle villain. Other original creations included Takua's pet crab Pewku, and a Gukko Bird designed to transport two Matoran. The Rahkshi are described by Bob Thompson as "like hounds hunting down the [Mask of Light]". They were created by Swinnerton, and comic writer Alan Grant helped develop their characters. They were designed to appear more machine-like than the rest of the cast, and their design were strongly inspired by the bio-mechanical artworks of H. R. Giger.

=== Audio ===
Voice casting was managed by Kris Zimmerman, who chose voice actors that seemed to suit certain roles: the Matoran were voiced by young adults, while the Turaga were voiced by older actors. The voice actors and their performances were chosen so they would not sound like they came from a specific area of the world, instead sound like they came from and belonged in the Bionicle universe. A notable event during recording was a behind-the-scenes incident between Michas and Francis: originally cast in the respective roles of Jaller and Takua, Michas came into a recording session in a muddled state and began reading Takua's lines by mistake. When Francis came in, he read Jaller's lines: when the staff heard them and were favourably impressed, the actors permanently switched roles. Voice acting for the project was mostly done in 2002, but dialogue was re-recorded during Additional Dialogue Recording (ADR) into 2003: approximately 30% of the final film's dialogue was done during ADR. Audio and music post-production was handled by Hacienda Post. The company's president Tim Borquez served as sound supervisor. Mask of Light was the first time in any media that Bionicle characters spoke in an audio format.

=== Soundtrack ===
Bionicle: Mask of Light

Film score by Nathan Furst
- Released: March 10, 2017
- Genre: Soundtrack
- Length: 1:06:27
- Label: Rising Phoenix Records

Nathan Furst chronology
Need for Speed (2014)	Bionicle: Mask of Light (2017)	Bionicle 2: Legends of Metru Nui (2017)

The music was composed by Nathan Furst, whose preferred composition style of grand orchestra and electronica was what the film's producers were looking for. Initially ignorant of the Bionicle universe, he explored the official website after getting the job as composer to get better context for his music. This and discussions he had with staff helped in the creation of eight or nine specific themes. The overall style is grand orchestral, but includes elements of electronic and tribal music. Furst used elements of African, Polynesian, and Eastern European music to communicate the fact that Mata Nui was an island, and when he could he incorporated his music into the action rather than leaving it as a standalone element within scenes.

Originally unavailable for purchase as a soundtrack, Furst published the score of Mask of Light as a digital album with Rising Phoenix Records in 2017, fourteen years after the film's release. The album, titled Bionicle: Mask of Light Original Score Soundtrack (14th Anniversary Release), was published on March 10. It is fully remastered and contains the complete score as heard in the film, consisting of eighteen tracks which comprise approximately an hour of music.

Original Score Soundtrack (14th Anniversary Release)

No.	Title	Length
1.	"Legend of the Bionicle"	4:08
2.	"A Great Kanohi Mask"	3:01
3.	"Our New Koli Field"	1:57
4.	"Koli Tournament"	2:10
5.	"Prophecy of a 7th Toa"	3:12
6.	"Gali's Meditation & Birth of the Rahkshi"	1:47
7.	"Trust in the Mask"	1:42
8.	"The Fall of Ta-Koro"	7:00
9.	"Toa Lewa Helps"	5:09
10.	"You Were Following Me"	1:46
11.	"Rahkshi Washed and Chilled"	2:51
12.	"Shadows Are Everywhere"	4:13
13.	"Destruction of Onu-Koro"	4:59
14.	"Healing Tahu"	2:41
15.	"Toa Reunited and Death of Jaller"	5:32
16.	"A New Hero"	2:12
17.	"A Simple Game of Koli"	5:45
18.	"Unity, Duty, Destiny"	6:22
Total length:		66:27

== Release ==
Mask of Light was first announced in April 2002 for release in September the following year. It was Lego Media's (later becoming Create TV & Film in early 2003) first project based on original characters and storylines, and their first direct-to-video production. It was initially released on 16 September 2003 for home video and DVD. It went on to release in 27 different countries over the next eight weeks. It was released under the Miramax Home Entertainment label alongside Buena Vista Home Entertainment. Prior to its release, the film received a world premiere at Legoland in Carlsbad, California on 13 September: the premiere featured a huge mosaic built of Lego and a special effects show, in addition to special guests and costumed characters. The following year, the film received its television premiere on Cartoon Network's Toonami program block.

At release, the film ranked high in multiple sales charts. In the "Top Kid Video" compiled by Billboard, it came close to the top of the charts upon release. Upon release, the film ranked at #2 on Amazon.com's VHS best seller list, coming in behind the VHS release of Lord of the Rings: The Two Towers. According to Lego's 2003 financial report, the film was top-selling VHS release in the United States in its first week, and ranked at #4 in a similar list compiled by The Hollywood Reporter. It was also among the top premiere DVDs of the year. The film's rental sales were also high, being placed at #8 in the animated direct-to-video charts and totalling $4.24 million revenue by October 2004. According to Animation Magazine, the film is considered to be a commercial success.

=== Critical reception ===
Entertainment Weekly gave the film a favourable ranking of "B+", calling it a "well-constructed CGI adventure" and saying that those who did not understand the story would enjoy the effects and action sequences. DVDTalk's Don Houston was generally positive about both the film and its additional content: he called the visuals "exceptionally crisp and clear" when compared to other films of its type, and gave high praise to the voice acting and noting darker themes within the film. His main criticism was that it relied heavily on foreknowledge of earlier Bionicle storylines. Sci Film.org praised the film's design and visuals, but felt that the film was too short, echoed Houston's criticism of a need for foreknowledge, and said that it was "too respectful" when compared to other films like Transformers: The Movie. Jules Faber of Digital Views Daily said the story had been designed with children in mind, and again praised the visuals despite seeing some stilted animations and poorly-done environmental effects. He was generally positive about the DVD's audio and visual quality. Both Houston and Faber noted homages to other well-known films, including The Lord of the Rings, Raiders of the Lost Ark, and the works of Ray Harryhausen.

== Legacy ==
Mask of Light won a Golden Reel Award for Best Visual Effects in a DVD Premiere Movie in December 2003. In addition, it won the Best DVD release award at the 2004 Saturn Awards. In 2014, Vulture.com made mention of the film in a 2014 retrospective on Lego's history in the movie industry. That same year, Radio Times ranked it as among the best films based on toys, saying that the developers "did a better-than-average job of translating the appeal of the toys to screen".

Mask of Light was promoted by Lego with new toys based on the film's original characters; a video game based on its story released in 2003; a line of shoes; and a novelisation of the film. Two further Bionicle films were confirmed prior to the release of Mask of Light, with the second being another direct-to-video feature and a third for theatrical release. The second film, Bionicle 2: Legends of Metru Nui, was released in 2004. The third film, Bionicle 3: Web of Shadows, was released as a direct-to-DVD feature in 2005. Both films were produced by the same creative team behind Mask of Light. A fourth film by a different studio, Bionicle: The Legend Reborn, was released in 2009 through Universal Pictures Home Entertainment. A four-episode television series based on the rebooted Bionicle toyline aired in the first quarter of 2016 on Netflix.
