= Turaga =

In Fijian, Turaga is the word for a man.

The Turaga-ni-Koro is a title for the head of a village (Koro), who is usually elected or appointed by the villagers. As kind of city administrator or mayor, he plays a key role in the modern Fijian government structure and is paid a small government allowance.

Similarly, the chief of a Mataqali (clan) is known as the Turaga-ni-mataqali. The exact historical status of the Turaga played an important role in conflicts regarding common landownership.

== See also ==
- House of Chiefs (Fiji)
