= Mike McCoy (filmmaker) =

American film director (born 1969)

- Born: August 7, 1969 (age 57)
- Other name: Mouse
- Occupations: Producer, director, editor
- Spouse: Carmella McCoy

Mike "Mouse" McCoy (born August 7, 1969) is an American film producer, director, and editor. Before entering the entertainment industry, McCoy worked as a professional motorcycle racer and stunt performer. He starred in and co-produced the documentary Dust to Glory (2004) and was co-director, producer, and editor of the film Act of Valor (2012).

== Early life and motorcycle career ==
McCoy began motorcycle racing at age four. At the age of 14, he turned his motocross career professional. In the early 1990s, McCoy took a break from racing due to injury, before returning to the sport and becoming the first motorcycle soloist rider to complete the Baja 1000 in 2003. McCoy went on to win overall for the Baja 500 in 2005 and has class wins in the Baja 1000 for 2002, 2005, and 2007. Following his Baja 500 championship in 2005, McCoy was also invited to the X Games as an athlete.

== Entertainment career ==
During his first break from racing in the early 1990s, McCoy learned about filmmaking by working under director Joe Pytka. He later worked as a stunt performer, working with such directors as Tony Scott, Rob Cohen, and John McTiernen.

In 2002, as a producer McCoy worked with director Dana Brown (Step Into Liquid) to document the Baja 1000 in the film Dust to Glory. The Baja 1000 is a 1000-mile car, truck, and motorcycle race in Mexico, which McCoy was the first person to complete on a motorcycle without switching drivers during the race. He finished 6th in class and 12th overall

In 2005, McCoy he was nominated for Best Overall Stunt by a Stunt Man at the World Stunt Awards.

Following another injury at the end of 2005, McCoy ended his professional stunt career and opened up his own production company, Bandito Brothers, with Scott Waugh.

In addition to full features, McCoy has also produced and directed transmedia commercial projects including ad campaigns and short films for Ford, BMW, Toyota, Kia, NASCAR, Mountain Dew, the U.S. Navy, U.S. Marines Corps, ESPN, and Hot Wheels.

In 2012, McCoy co-directed Act of Valor, a film featuring the United States Navy SEALs, with Scott Waugh.

== Filmography ==
- Dust to Glory (2004)
- Act of Valor (2012)
