= Bionicle 3: Web of Shadows =

- Directed by: Terry Shakespeare; David Molina
- Screenplay by: Brett Matthews
- Story by: Bob Thompson; Henry Gilroy; Greg Farshtey
- Produced by: Sue Shakespeare; Bob Thompson
- Edited by: Billy Jones
- Music by: Nathan Furst
- Production companies: Miramax Home Entertainment; Good Story Productions; Creative Capers Entertainment; Create TV & Film; CGCG
- Distributed by: Buena Vista Home Entertainment
- Release date: October 11, 2005
- Running time: 74 minutes
- Countries: Denmark; Taiwan; United States
- Language: English

Bionicle 3: Web of Shadows is a 2005 animated science fantasy action film based on the Bionicle toy line by Lego and the third installment in the Bionicle film series. It is a direct sequel to Bionicle 2: Legends of Metru Nui, and largely adapts the 2005 storyline with the majority of events taking place before the previous film's ending. Like Legends of Metru Nui, Web of Shadows is a prequel to the first film, Bionicle: Mask of Light. This is the first Bionicle film to not be given a rating by the MPAA. It was released exclusively on DVD on October 11, 2005, by Buena Vista Home Entertainment under the Miramax Home Entertainment label.

== Plot ==
Makuta, the Master of Shadows, is still frozen in his crystal prison following the events of the previous film. A mysterious figure calls out his name, then scratches the prison and extracts a shard from it. This figure is later revealed to be Roodaka, the queen of the Visorak horde, and she is later shown infusing the shard into her chest as a heartstone as she vows to free Makuta from his prison.

Vakama, as a Turaga, narrates the story of the Toa Metru. Combining their elemental powers to seal the Makuta in protodermis, the Toa left Metru Nui to find a home for the sleeping Matoran, vowing to return to the city to rescue those they were forced to leave behind. However, in their absence, the city became overrun by the Visorak horde led by King Sidorak and Queen Roodaka.

The Toa Metru (Vakama, Nokama, Matau, Onewa, Whenua, and Nuju) arrive on the shore of Metru Nui and proceed towards the Coliseum where the Matoran are being held, observing the damage that has been dealt to the city. They are soon ambushed and captured by a group of Visorak and taken to the Coliseum. Roodaka suggests they are infused with the Visorak's venom and mutated into beast-like creatures. Having been ordered to be killed by Sidorak, king of the Visorak horde, the Toa are sent to fall to their deaths. They are saved by six flying beings, Rahaga, led by Norik.

Norik explains that the Visorak venom has transformed the Toa into Hordika, making them more susceptible to their bestial natures. As they will remain Hordika forever if the venom is not neutralized in time, their only hope of changing back is to find an ancient hermit-like Rahi named Keetongu, which many consider a myth. Vakama grows agitated over continually being blamed for the Toa's current situation and storms off, choosing to try and save the Matoran alone, but is cornered by Visorak and once again captured. Roodaka takes advantage of Vakama's current state of mind by offering him a proposal: if he commands the Visorak horde, he can rule Metru Nui. With his Hordika instinct overpowering his rational mind, Vakama accepts her offer.

The other Toa and the Rahaga go to the Great Temple in the Ga-Metru district to search for clues to Keetongu's whereabouts. Vakama ambushes the Rahaga during the night, capturing five of them and leaving behind a badly injured Norik as a warning. He takes them to Sidorak, who grants Vakama a place as the general of the Visorak horde. Norik later informs the Toa of what Vakama has done, reiterating that they must find Keetongu before their bestial states completely consume them, as Vakama has apparently been. Using inscriptions translated before the attack, the group follows a trail that leads them to Keetongu's lair at the top of the Ko-Metru district. Though reluctant at first, Keetongu eventually agrees to aid them.

The Toa return to the Coliseum and engage the Visorak. Matau confronts Vakama alone, while Keetongu goes after the king and queen. Roodaka orchestrates the death of Sidorak by leaving him to be killed by Keetongu. Matau tries to reason with Vakama as they fight; he apologizes for doubting Vakama's leadership and eventually prompts Vakama to return to his senses by reminding him of his duty and destiny to rescue the Matoran.

Norik frees his fellow Rahaga and joins the Toa, but Roodaka arrives and demands control over the Toa's elemental powers. Vakama and Matau rejoin the rest of the team, with Vakama feigning continued allegiance to Roodaka. After the other five Toa unsuccessfully attempt to defeat Roodaka by firing their elemental spinner weapons at her, Vakama reveals his change of heart and orders the Visorak to leave and be free; having been placed under his command, the horde obeys. Unaware of Roodaka's heartstone being the shard she carved from Makuta's prison, Vakama then proceeds to fire his own spinner at it, unwittingly breaking the seal and setting Makuta free; the Master of Shadows uses his powers to teleport the incapacitated Roodaka to safety. Made fully aware of his actions by Norik, Vakama is nevertheless confident that they can stop him again. After Keetongu returns the Hordika to their Toa Metru forms, the Toa bid farewell to him and the Rahaga and depart Metru Nui with the Matorans.

Turaga Vakama concludes the story of the Toa Metru that he had been recounting to Takanuva, Jaller, and Hahli following the events of the first film. As they leave, Vakama tells them that it is time for them to find their own destiny.

== Cast and characters ==
- Alessandro Juliani as Toa Vakama
  - Christopher Gaze as Turaga Vakama (narrator)
- Brian Drummond as Toa Matau & Toa Onewa
- Tabitha St. Germain as Toa Nokama
- Paul Dobson as Toa Whenua & Sidorak
- Trevor Devall as Toa Nuju & Rahaga Iruini
- French Tickner as Rahaga Norik
- Kathleen Barr as Roodaka & Rahaga Gaaki
- Scott McNeil as Keetongu & Rahaga Bomonga

== Production ==
David Molina and Terry Shakespeare worked as Art Directors on the film in addition to directing, and Terry also worked as Visual Effects Supervisor.

== Soundtrack ==
Bionicle 3: Web of Shadows

Film score by Nathan Furst
- Released: December 22, 2017
- Genre: Soundtrack
- Length: 1:05:43
- Label: Rising Phoenix Records

Nathan Furst chronology
Bionicle 2: Legends of Metru Nui (2017)	Bionicle 3: Web of Shadows (2017)

Nathan Furst, who composed the music for the first two films, returned once more to compose Web of Shadows. His work on the film was praised by director David Molina who said that watching the film with the music was an "amazing experience", making the story "suddenly alive and emotional". The soundtrack was released on December 22, 2017, twelve years after the film's release. It contains the complete score as it was written for the film and, like the other two soundtracks, is fully remastered.

The soundtrack includes Furst's original, unused sketch for Roodaka's theme as a bonus track. While the full theme is unused in the film itself in favor of a different motif associated with the character, hints of the sketch are present at various moments throughout the score and an alternate variation can be heard in the film's DVD menus.

No.	Title	Length
1.	"Web of Shadows"	2:15
2.	"Shipwrecked and Stunned"	3:18
3.	"Sidorak and Roodaka"	3:57
4.	"Flying Escape"	3:41
5.	"Can't Be Ugly"	0:44
6.	"Roodaka's Evil Plan"	2:14
7.	"The Rahaga"	2:07
8.	"Vakama Captured"	5:03
9.	"Roodaka Seduces Vakama"	2:47
10.	"I Doubt You'd Recognize Me"	1:56
11.	"The Great Temple"	2:55
12.	"Vakama Has Changed"	2:23
13.	"The Falling Tears"	2:49
14.	"The Visorak Hoard"	0:48
15.	"Keetongu Found"	4:18
16.	"Bow Down to Vakama and Sidorak"	7:02
17.	"What Happened to You"	1:09
18.	"Strength Comes from Unity"	8:52
19.	"Makuta Set Free"	3:14
20.	"Off to Mata Nui"	3:18
21.	"Roodaka (Unused Theme)"	1:07
Total length:		1:05:43

- The film's end credits feature the song "Caught in a Dream" by All Insane Kids, one of the two songs they had written for the 2005 storyline.

== Reception ==
The film received mixed to positive reviews. The computer-generated effects were praised by some critics, stating that they could be appreciated even though the film was geared toward teenagers and young people. The DVD release was noted for its good quality audio and video but meager extras.

Bionicle 3 was nominated for the Golden Reel Award for Best Sound Editing in Direct to Video by the Motion Pictures Sound Editors, and the Annie Award for Best Home Entertainment Production.
