= Creative Capers Entertainment =

American animation studio

- Industry: Animation
- Founded: 1989; 37 years ago
- Founders: David Molina; Sue Shakespeare; Terry Shakespeare
- Headquarters: Altadena, California, United States
- Website: Official website

Creative Capers Entertainment is an American animation studio founded by Terry and Sue Shakespeare with David Molina in 1989. Based in Altadena, California, it specializes in Flash and hand-drawn animation in various feature films, television series, commercials, CD-ROMs and video games.

The studio was originally populated by animators who worked for Sullivan Bluth Studios Ireland Limited, including Mark Koetsier, Silvia Hoefnagels, Stefan Fjeldmark (one of the directors of Talking Tom & Friends), Greg Tiernan (co-founder of Dagda Film and founder of Nitrogen Studios), Shane Zalvin, Shawn Krause and Adam Burke. It also operated a division called Creative Capers Cartoons, also known as The Hollywood Cartoon Company, which was mainly used for providing additional animation for some feature films. The studio was also an uncredited additional animation facility for Disney's Beauty and the Beast, Aladdin and The Lion King, and most notably provided the CGI animation for the direct-to-video Bionicle trilogy.

== Filmography ==
=== Films ===
- Tom and Jerry: The Movie (1992) (additional animation, as Creative Capers Cartoons)
- Once Upon a Forest (1993) (additional animation, as The Hollywood Cartoon Company)
- The Pagemaster (1994) (additional animation, as The Hollywood Cartoon Company)
- 101 Dalmatians (1996) (CGI game sequence)
- Mr. Magoo (1997) (opening sequence)
- The Tigger Movie (2000) (additional animation)

=== Direct-to-Video ===
- Sweetsville (2003)
- Bionicle: Mask of Light (2003)
- Bionicle 2: Legends of Metru Nui (2004)
- Bionicle 3: Web of Shadows (2005)
- Smallville Legends: Kara and the Chronicles of Krypton (2008)

=== Television specials ===
- Roxy Hunter and the Myth of the Mermaid (2008)
- Roxy Hunter and the Secret of the Shaman (2008)
- Roxy Hunter and the Horrific Halloween (2008)

=== Television series ===
- Fievel's American Tails (1992–1994) (additional animation, as The Hollywood Cartoon Company)
- Nightmare Ned (1997)
- Sitting Ducks (2001–2003)

=== Games ===
- Ultrabots (1993) (character designs)
- Mickey Mania: The Timeless Adventures of Mickey Mouse (1994) (animation)
- Disney's Animated Storybook: The Lion King (1994) (animation)
- Aladdin Activity Center (1994) (animation)
- Disney's Animated Storybook: Winnie the Pooh and the Honey Tree (1995) (animation)
- The Lion King: Timon & Pumbaa's Jungle Games (1995) (animation)
- Gargoyles (1995) (animation)
- Maui Mallard in Cold Shadow (1995) (animation)
- Disney's Animated Storybook: Pocahontas (1995) (animation)
- The Walt Disney World Explorer (1996) (animation)
- The Lion King Activity Center (1996) (animation)
- The Hunchback of Notre Dame: Topsy Turvy Gamebreak (1996) (animation)
- Disney's Animated Storybook: 101 Dalmatians (1996) (animation)
- 101 Dalmatians: Escape from DeVil Manor (1997) (animation)
- Disney's Animated Storybook: The Hunchback of Notre Dame (1997) (animation)
- Disney's Magic Artist 2 (1997) (animation)
- Hercules (1997) (animation)
- Nightmare Ned (1997) (animation)
- Disney's Animated Storybook: Hercules (1998) (animation)
- Ariel's Story Studio (1998) (animation)
- The Little Mermaid Photo Fun Print Studio (1998) (animation)
- The Lion King 2: Simba's Pride Activity Play (1998) (animation)
- Disney's Animated Storybook: Mulan (1999) (animation)
- Mulan Print Studio (1999) (animation)
- Tarzan Activity Center (2000) (animation)
- Winnie the Pooh Activity Center (2000) (animation)
