= Alastair Swinnerton =

British writer

Alastair Swinnerton is a UK author and writer/producer known mostly for his involvement with Lego Bionicle, which he co-created with Bob Thompson and Martin Andersen of Lego and Christian Faber of Danish advertising agency Advance.

However, he has been writing and creating animation since the late 1980s, and was the co-creator and co-writer of The Baskervilles, Alphanim's 2000 26 half-hour cartoon series set in Hell, or a theme park based on Hell depending on which country it was viewed in. He has many other credits, including the 1998 series of The Wombles, and the second season of the Emmy-nominated Disney Channel/Dorling Kindersley series Amazing Animals. He has been associated with various companies, including Skryptonite, which he co-founded with producers Ken Anderson and Tony Barnes, and Corsham Entertainment, in which he was briefly partnered by Gary Kurtz, producer of Star Wars, and Richard Bazeley, a former Disney animator. In 2002, he went solo again, and was the writer, and co-director & co-producer with Neil Graham of London's Zoo Films, of The Tale of Jack Frost, a half-hour CGI Christmas special based on the David Melling book that first aired on CBBC at Christmas 2004 and which was nominated for a BAFTA in 2005.

Since then he has written on numerous series, including Sabrina the Teenage Witch for Los Angeles–based Mike Young Productions, Jungle Book Series 2 for India's DQ Entertainment, Dennis and Gnasher for Red Kite Animation and Wobblyland, created by Cat Little, and produced by Brown Bag Films and HiT Entertainment. He is still writing for other people, as well as developing his own series.

In 2015, his first Young Adult fantasy novel 'The Multiverse of Max Tovey' released, about a troubled teenager who discovers to his delight and alarm that his troubles are nothing to do with him, and everything to do with being a time traveller.
