= Bionicle 2: Legends of Metru Nui =

- Directed by: Terry Shakespeare; David Molina
- Screenplay by: Henry Gilroy; Greg Klein; Tom Pugsley
- Story by: Bob Thompson; Henry Gilroy
- Produced by: Sue Shakespeare
- Edited by: Craig Russo
- Music by: Nathan Furst
- Production companies: Miramax Home Entertainment; The Lego Group; Create TV & Film; Creative Capers Entertainment; CGCG
- Distributed by: Buena Vista Home Entertainment
- Release dates: October 6, 2004 (El Capitan Theatre); October 19, 2004 (United States)
- Running time: 75 minutes
- Countries: Denmark; Taiwan; United States
- Language: English

Bionicle 2: Legends of Metru Nui is a 2004 animated science fantasy action film and the second film based on Lego's Bionicle toy line. It is a prequel to the first film, Bionicle: Mask of Light. This film follows the 2004 storyline and was created using Lego elements from the Bionicle series. It is also the second of the two films in the franchise to be given a rating by the MPAA. It was released on DVD and VHS on October 19, 2004, by Buena Vista Home Entertainment under the Miramax Home Entertainment label.

In this film, Vakama recalls events that took place long before the classic Bionicle stories at Mata Nui, during which he, along with his friends Nuju, Matau, Onewa, Whenua, and Nokama were chosen to be the new Toa of the island of Metru Nui. To save the city, they must prove themselves worthy Toa, find their mask powers, and protect the "Heart of Metru Nui", but they also find themselves caught up in the schemes of the evil Makuta.

The film received mixed reviews, with some noting the filling in of plot holes from the previous film. The series continued to be noted for its visual effects and musical score. It was followed by a sequel, Bionicle 3: Web of Shadows.

== Plot ==
Turaga Vakama narrates the story of a land before Mata Nui, called Metru Nui. There, the Toa heroes fell in battle one by one, as a relentless shadow sought to conquer the great city.

Lhikan, the last remaining Toa, travels throughout the entire city, giving Toa stones containing fractions of his own power to six Matorans from each of the city's different regions: Nokama, Onewa, Whenua, Matau, Nuju, and Vakama. After giving the last stone to Vakama, Lhikan is captured by two Dark Hunters, Nidhiki and Krekka. Vakama later meets the other Matoran at the Great Temple in Ga-Metru; they are transformed into six new Toa. After Vakama has a vision of Metru Nui's destruction, they all set out to recover the six Great Disks hidden throughout Metru Nui, hoping to prove to Turaga Dume, the city's leader, that they are worthy of Toa.

However, Dume declares that "simple gifts" will not confirm them as Toa and puts them to a grueling test instead. When the six fail to pass, Dume denounces them as imposters and unleashes the Vahki, the city's law enforcers, upon them. In the ensuing chaos, Onewa, Whenua, and Nuju are captured. At the same time, Vakama, Nokama, and Matau escape the Coliseum by leaping into the city's chute transport system, with the Dark Hunters in pursuit.

The Dark Hunters force a chute worker to reverse the flow of the chute system, forcing Vakama, Nokama, and Matau to abandon the chute system in the ice region of Ko-Metru. They then set out to find Onewa, Whenua, Nuju, and Lhikan, whom Vakama believes is still alive after seeing his spirit star in the sky. They hitch a ride on a Vahki transport to Po-Metru, where they are ambushed by the Dark Hunters and forced to flee from a herd of Kikanalo beasts. Nokama discovers that her mask allows her to speak and understand foreign languages and persuades the Kikanalo to help them find Lhikan; Matau discovers his mask power of shape-shifting along the way.

Meanwhile, Onewa, Whenua, and Nuju are trying unsuccessfully to escape when they are approached by a mysterious Turaga, who explains that Toa mask powers are needed to escape and teaches them how to activate them. Growing impatient, Onewa, Whenua, and Nuju argue until Onewa's mind-control and Nuju's telekinesis mask powers activate, and Nuju uses his power to create an escape route. Whenua then discovers his mask power of night vision before the four reunite with Vakama, Nokama, and Matau. The Turaga then reveals himself to be Lhikan, who sacrificed his power to turn the six Matoran into Toa. He inquires about the safety of the 'Heart of Metru Nui', which Vakama believed was Lhikan himself, but is actually the Matoran. Blaming himself, Vakama attempts to leave but then discovers a small canister that contains the real Dume; the Dume from before was an impostor.

Pursued by the Vahki, the Toa and Lhikan set out to stop the false Dume, who has summoned the Matoran to the Coliseum to be placed in canisters to sleep. The false Dume reveals himself to be Makuta in disguise and plunges the Great Spirit, Mata Nui, into slumber. The Toa gather as many Matoran capsules as possible and race to escape the crumbling city. On their way out, the Dark Hunters attack them again, but they are killed, along with a Nivawk (Makuta's spy), when Makuta absorbs them.

As the group leaves Metru Nui, Vakama creates the legendary Mask of Time, which he unsuccessfully tried to do as a Matoran from the Great Disks. Makuta pursues the Toa, attacking them by raising and dropping pillars of protodermis. With help from Nuju's telekinesis, Vakama is able to get up the cliff to confront Makuta, donning the Mask of Time.

However, Lhikan is killed while protecting Vakama in the ensuing battle, whilst the mask is separated from Vakama. In an anguished rage, Vakama knocks the Mask of Time into the sea and defeats Makuta in combat using his newfound mask power: invisibility. The Toa combine their powers to seal Makuta in a protodermis prison and move on to the surface, emerging on an island that they named 'Mata Nui', in honor of the Great Spirit. There, they sacrifice their Toa power to awaken the Matoran and become Turaga. Vakama gives Lhikan's mask to a Matoran named Jaller, whose original mask had been broken during the journey, as the Matoran and Turaga begin their new lives on Mata Nui.

== Cast ==
- Alessandro Juliani as Toa Vakama, the Toa of Fire, a former mask-maker who sees prophetic visions of the future.
  - Christopher Gaze as Turaga Vakama (the narrator)
- Gerard Plunkett as Turaga Dume, the leader of Metru Nui.
- Tabitha St. Germain as Toa Nokama, the Toa of Water, a former teacher who strives to do her duty.
- Michael Dobson as Toa/Turaga Lhikan, a Toa of Fire and former guardian of Metru Nui & Krekka, a powerful but unintelligent Dark Hunter.
- Brian Drummond as Toa Matau, the Toa of Air, a lighthearted former test driver & Toa Onewa, the Toa of Stone, a headstrong and independent former carver.
- Paul Dobson as Toa Whenua, the Toa of Earth with respect for the past & Nidhiki, a former Toa turned Dark Hunter.
- Trevor Devall as Toa Nuju, the Toa of Ice with respect for the future.
- Lee Tockar as Makuta, the main antagonist & Kongu, a Matoran operating the chutes in Metru Nui.

== Production ==
Plans were in place before the release of the first Bionicle film to create a second film. The directors Terry Shakespeare and David Molina did have some input into the storyline, though most of the mythology had already been sketched out.

For the visual style of the film, director David Molina explained their direction: "We wanted to give this audience a bigger view of the Bionicle world – more environments, larger vistas. The island of Bionicle 2 is something like Manhattan, with lots of commerce and large buildings. The first film was very intimate, very organic. Metru Nui is more mechanical, so it has a different feel".

Talking about the camera work, director Terry Shakespeare said that they concentrated on depth of field with the camera. Comparing the two Bionicles, he felt that "the first film had primary colors that were coded to the areas and a younger feel. For BIONICLE 2, we opened it up – the palette had to be more sophisticated, more realistic with earth tones, so we desaturated the characters".

Most of the animation was created in Taiwan by CGCG. The process of creating the film, from storyboarding to delivery of the film took 12 months. Molina additionally added that the pipeline and process for creating this film was faster and more refined than the original Bionicle film. Shakespeare said that their strength was to bring characters to life and not just as robots.

== Release and promotion ==
Bionicle 2: Legends of Metru Nui was released on DVD on October 6, 2004, in the United States. The DVD included a number of documentaries including the making of the film and associated toy line. There is also a featurette entitled "The Legend Revealed" that has a brief question and answer session with the production team. Some critics were concerned that the DVD makes too much of an attempt to sell the Bionicle product.

Like the first film in the trilogy, the second one was also released by Miramax Films and Walt Disney Studios Home Entertainment under legal entity Buena Vista Home Entertainment, for its direct-to-video release.

Cartoon Network's Toonami aired several scenes from the film along with the first Bionicle film Mask of Light. The film was first screened on October 6, 2004, at the El Capitan Theatre in Hollywood, California. Cartoon Network aired the film for the first time less than two months after its release on December 18, at 7 p.m. Eastern Time.

RTL Disney Television Limited Partnership's Super RTL also aired the film from Germany in 2005.

== Soundtrack ==
Bionicle 2: Legends of Metru Nui

Film score by Nathan Furst
- Released: December 12, 2017
- Genre: Soundtrack
- Length: 57:27
- Label: Rising Phoenix Records

Nathan Furst chronology
Bionicle: Mask of Light (2017)	Bionicle 2: Legends of Metru Nui (2017)	Bionicle 3: Web of Shadows (2017)

Nathan Furst, composer of the first film's soundtrack, returned to score Legends of Metru Nui. In place of the tribal elements used in Mask of Light, Furst integrated electronic and techno sounds into the second film's music to accommodate its futuristic style.

The Legends of Metru Nui score was released as a digital album on December 12, 2017, thirteen years after the film's release. Unlike the Mask of Light and Web of Shadows soundtracks which contain the complete scores from their respective films, this release contains most of the Legends of Metru Nui score while omitting music from some scenes. Furst explained that two tracks were excluded on purpose due to their redundancy and because they would have disrupted the "flow" of the album, though he has also said that he plans to distribute them.

This release includes two "bonus tracks"; the first is an alternate "Desert/Kikeinalo" theme that was unused in the film, while the second is Furst's original sketch for Lhikan's theme which was used partially in the film's DVD menus and incorporated into the score at various moments featuring the character.

The soundtrack's initial lack of availability was partially due to it being lost in a hard drive crash for several years, as Furst stated multiple times. Prior to the 2017 release, Furst revealed that the "entire score" was eventually recovered thanks to his assistant.

No.	Title	Length
1.	"Legend of Metru Nui / Toa Stones"	5:33
2.	"Lhikan's Capture / Vakama's Vision"	2:46
3.	"Dume's Request"	1:03
4.	"Faithful Matoran to Mighty Toa"	4:13
5.	"Arena Challenge"	3:26
6.	"Vahki Attack!"	1:36
7.	"Escaping Dark Hunters"	2:02
8.	"Bad Things Happen in the Desert"	5:05
9.	"Mask Powers / Herd of Vahki"	4:32
10.	"Makuta Is Dume"	2:05
11.	"Heart of Metru Nui"	6:17
12.	"Follow the Light / Mask of Time"	4:52
13.	"Lhikan's Death / Vakama's Power Found"	5:27
14.	"Island of Mata Nui"	4:25
15.	"Bionicle 2 End Titles"	1:28
16.	"Unused Alternate Desert/Kikeinalo Theme (Bonus Trk)"	1:28
17.	"Lhikan Theme Sketch (DVD Menu)"	1:09
Total length:		57:27

== Reception ==
Though reviewers were still skeptical as to the toy promotional nature of these films, several noted their marked improvement over the original Bionicle film, including its filling-in of major plot holes that had been present in the first film. It was also noted for its references to The Lord of the Rings, Star Wars, The Matrix, and Excalibur. There was concern that the Bionicle brand promoted violence, running counter to the LEGO themes of patience and careful construction. A sequel titled Bionicle 3: Web of Shadows was released in 2005.

Bionicle 2 was nominated at the DVD Exclusive Awards for Best Animated Premiere Movie. It was also nominated for best director and best original score. The film was nominated at the 32nd Annual Saturn Awards for Best DVD release. It was also an iParenting Media Award winner for Best Home Video/DVD. Two awards were won by the studio that created Bionicle 2 at the 27th Annual Telly Awards. It also won the Golden Reel Award for Sound Editing in a Direct to Video Release.
