= Scott Waugh =

American film director

- Born: August 22, 1970 (age 56); Los Angeles, California, U.S.
- Education: University of California (BFA)
- Occupations: Stunt performer (retired 2005), producer, editor, director
- Relatives: Ric Roman Waugh (brother)

Scott Waugh (born August 22, 1970) is an American filmmaker and former stunt performer. He won the "10 Directors to Watch" award at the 2012 Palm Springs International Film Festival. He is the son of stuntman Fred Waugh and younger brother of director Ric Roman Waugh.

== Filmography ==
Year	Title	Director	Producer	Editor
2007	Navy SWCC	Yes	Yes	Yes
2012	Act of Valor	Yes (Note: Co-directed with Mike McCoy)	Yes	Yes
2014	Need for Speed	Yes	Executive	Yes
2017	6 Below: Miracle on the Mountain	Yes	Yes	Yes
2023	Hidden Strike	Yes	No	No
2023	Expend4bles	Yes	No	No
2026	Runner	Yes	No	No
