= Jay Dobyns =

American law enforcement officer and author

- Born: Jay Anthony Dobyns; July 24, 1961 (age 65); Hammond, Indiana, U.S.
- Other names: "Jaybird"; "Bird"
- Education: University of Arizona, B.S., Public Administration
- Occupations: Special Agent; author; public speaker; football coach
- Employer: Bureau of Alcohol, Tobacco, Firearms and Explosives
- Notable work: No Angel: My Harrowing Undercover Journey to the Inner Circle of the Hells Angels (Random House, ISBN 978-0307405869)
- Children: 2
- Website: jaydobyns.com

Jay Anthony "Jaybird" Dobyns (born July 24, 1961) is a retired Special Agent and veteran undercover operative with the United States Bureau of Alcohol, Tobacco, Firearms and Explosives (ATF), author, public speaker, high school football coach, and University of Arizona adjunct professor.

Dobyns joined the ATF in 1987 and was involved in more than 500 undercover operations during his 27-year career as a Special Agent. Most notably, he infiltrated the Hells Angels motorcycle gang in Arizona between 2001 and 2003 as part of Operation Black Biscuit. In 2009, Dobyns became a New York Times Best-Selling author with his memoir, No Angel: My Harrowing Undercover Journey to the Inner Circle of the Hells Angels. He retired from the ATF in 2014.

== Early life ==
Born in Hammond, Indiana, Dobyns was raised in a middle-class family in Tucson, Arizona, where his father had moved the family looking for work as a carpenter. He was a standout athlete in several sports at Sahuaro High School before receiving a football scholarship to attend the University of Arkansas in 1980. In 1982, Dobyns transferred to the University of Arizona, where he became an All-Pacific-10 conference wide receiver and college football All-American candidate. He is still ranked as one of the best receivers in the history of the Arizona Wildcats. Dobyns was named to the Wildcats "All-Century" football team by the Arizona Daily Star in 1999, and was named the "#1 Badass Arizona football player in history" by the Tucson Citizen in 2011. He is also a member of the Sahuaro High School and Pima County Sports Hall of Fame. Dobyns graduated in 1985 with a bachelor's degree in public administration.

Dobyns was invited to the NFL Scouting Combine before he was drafted in the 1985 USFL territorial draft by the Arizona Outlaws of the United States Football League, where he played for one season. He later had unsuccessful tryouts with the Chicago Bears and the Ottawa Rough Riders of the Canadian Football League. Describing the end of his football career, Dobyns told the author Mike Detty in 2020: "I'm a person who never had a Plan B... My Plan A was to play football and through college I became pretty full of myself. It turned out I wasn't as good as I thought I was. When football fell apart for me I was like, 'What now?'." He then decided on a career in federal law enforcement, initially considering joining the Federal Bureau of Investigation (FBI) or Secret Service. Dobyns stated he did not wish to work in an office as he wanted "action", but ruled out a military career under the grounds that he did not wish to wear a uniform. In an interview in 2006 with the Canadian journalists Julian Sher and William Marsden, Dobyns stated that he joined the Bureau of Alcohol, Tobacco, Firearms and Explosives (ATF) "because of their reputation for street work". The ATF historically had an understanding of street work and what it's like to be a street officer or a highway patrolman. And I think that's the beauty of the ATF: the ATF never fully embraced that federal stereotype of showing up with a suit and tie and a notepad and reporting to a crime scene after the fact. It's as close to being a street cop as you can be and be a fed".

== Federal law enforcement career ==
Dobyns became a Special Agent with the Bureau of Alcohol, Tobacco and Firearms (ATF) in 1987. On November 19, 1987, less than a week after beginning operational duty, he was taken hostage at gunpoint in a trailer park near Tucson Airport while serving an arrest warrant on Brent Provestgaard, a convicted felon who had recently been released from prison. Provestgaard forced Dobyns into the driver seat of the officers' undercover car, which was immediately surrounded by the other agents with guns drawn. During a brief standoff, the agitated gunman repeatedly screamed at Dobyns to drive away. Dobyns told Sher and Marsden for their book Angels of Death that he was thinking at the time: "This guy is probably going to shoot me one way or the other. I'd rather have him shoot me with my people around me versus driving me twenty miles out into the desert and killing me there". When Dobyns intentionally pulled the car keys from the ignition and dropped them to the floor, Provestgaard fired a single .38 caliber pistol bullet into Dobyns' lung, which exited his upper chest. The other ATF agents instantly opened fire from both sides of the car, killing the gunman. As Dobyns lay bleeding on the floor of the car, he recalled: "I was lying in the desert thinking, I got shot before I even got my first paycheck! You know what, I'm going to fuckin' die. I have been on the job a week and I'm going to die in this fuckin' trailer park". Critically wounded, Dobyns was rushed to Kino Community Hospital in Tucson, where Dr. Richard Carmona, who later became the 17th United States Surgeon General, performed emergency trauma surgery that saved Dobyns' life. The shooting ended Dobyns' marriage. His 21-year-old wife told him: "I don't want you to do this anymore". Dobyns replied: "This is what I'm supposed to do. This is what I want to do". Shortly afterwards, Dobyns' wife filed for divorce.

Despite the severity of his wounds, Dobyns refused disability retirement and returned to duty within months of the shooting. The publicity generated by the incident was felt to make Dobyns unsuitable for undercover work, which he insisted on continuing as he told his supervisor about his offer of a desk job: "Absolutely not. I didn't freaking come here to sit behind a desk and sit on a phone and make my case by using a fax machine and a computer". In the spring of 1988, Dobyns attended the Federal Law Enforcement Training Center (FLETC) in Glynco, Georgia. While at the training center, he was offered a professional football contract with the Dallas Cowboys due to an NFL players' strike but declined the offer, explaining: "I knew the strike wasn't going to last forever. Did I want to trade a couple weeks or months or a season of my dream to play professional football for a life and a career of what I really enjoyed doing? I was like 'Thank you, I'm going to stay where I'm at. I'm content with where I'm at.' I'd found a new home and a new Plan A."

After graduating from the FLETC, Dobyns was transferred to Chicago. One ATF agent who worked with Dobyns in Chicago, Chris Bayless, told Sher and Marsden: "Jay is probably one of the best undercover guys, bar none. What makes you good is being able to keep your shit together when everything around you is just spiraling out of control". Dobyns and Bayless worked undercover on the South Side of Chicago, posing as gunrunners to various gang members. In Chicago, Dobyns married a second time, this time to the graphic artist Gwen, whom he had met in Tucson.

During a botched bust in Joliet, Illinois in August 1989 when Dobyns and Bayless attempted to arrest a group of Vice Lord gangsters for trying to buy an illegal machine gun, the suspects fled in their automobile while the two ATF agents tried to block the street. The gangsters sped forward in their car while one of them rolled down a window and fired two shots. Dobyns shot the driver of the car in the shoulder, but was run over. Bayless recalled: "He flips up in the air, his shoes go flying off. I could see his eyes go back in his head. I thought he was dead...Jay flew into the air, but he had enough sense to catch himself, twist his body around and fire another round at the car before he hit the ground". Dobyns hit the glass of the front window of the car head first and both of his kneecaps were blown out of their sockets. Despite his injuries and the pain, Dobyns told Bayless from his uncomfortable position: "Go fuckin' kill them!". Bayless arrested the suspects shortly afterwards. Bayless told Sher and Marsden about his partner: "This was a guy who had been taken hostage and shot back in Arizona. Then he comes here and gets run over and almost shot and killed a second time. He still sucks it up and goes out there everyday and works harder than anybody else I know".

In 1992, another ATF agent, Carlos Canino, was involved in a shoot-out in Los Angeles that left a man dead. In the aftermath of the shooting, Canino suffered from depression and self-doubt. Dobyns was sent to Los Angeles to mentor Canino and helped recover from his depression. Dobyns said of his mentoring: "We take care of each other because we know how quickly the tables can turn and the counsellor could be on the wrong end of a bullet and be the victim. Carlos is a brave, brave man". Canino later served with Dobyns on Operation Black Biscuit.

Following the Oklahoma City bombing in 1995, Dobyns was assigned to investigate various high-profile targets in the militia movement in Nevada, including Bo Gritz. During this investigation, Dobyns and his undercover partner, Vincent A. Cefalu, encountered Jeffrey Tenpenny, a lone wolf terrorist who orchestrated a conspiracy to detonate improvised explosive devices at three Las Vegas casinos—The Mirage, Treasure Island, and the Golden Nugget—and assassinate Carolyn Ellsworth, an attorney for the casino magnate Steve Wynn. Tenpenny had suffered a serious head injury in a hotel elevator accident at the Golden Nugget in 1990 and subsequently sued the casino for damages. Repeated postponements of the personal injury trial resulted in Tenpenny pursuing a vendetta against Wynn's Mirage Resorts, which culminated in the revenge bombing plot.

As part of a sting operation, Dobyns and Cefalu, posing as sympathizers to the militia movement, held a discussion with Tenpenny in a car rigged with microphones and cameras on June 19, 1995, and agreed to provide him with C-4 explosives. The agents then did a "walk-through" of the Treasure Island casino with Tenpenny, who described his plans in detail. Dobyns explained to Barry Kaufman of South magazine in 2019: "[Tenpenny] had plans to do it with C-4 bombs disguised as common items left in hotels—briefcases, picnic baskets. I remember telling him, 'Do you understand what you're going to do? Do you understand the size and scope of what you're planning? Babies, grandmas and kids are going to die in this.' He just pulled up his shirt and showed us a tattoo of a heart colored in black. He said, 'See this? I have a black heart. I don’t care'." On June 22, 1995, Dobyns and Cefalu delivered C-4 explosives and blasting caps to Tenpenny at his home and received payment, at which point he was arrested. Tenpenny pleaded guilty to possession of an unregistered destructive device; being a felon in possession of a firearm; and unlawful use of controlled substances in possession of a firearm. On March 19, 1996, he was sentenced to seven years' imprisonment. Dobyns described the prevention of the bombings as the most "important" case of his career.

In the fall of 1999, Bayless and Dobyns went undercover in Colorado in an operation against an outlaw biker gang, the Sons of Silence. Both agents went about in an ostentatious fashion visiting bars wearing bikers vests with the patch of the Unforgiven Motorcycle Club, a fake biker gang, in an attempt to provoke a reaction from the Sons of Silence who saw bikers from a rival gang wearing their patches on their territory as a threat. Both Bayless and Dobyns wore wires that recorded the threats from the Sons of Silence who told them that to continue wearing the patches of the Unforgiven in their area would mean death, which was intended to provide evidence that could be used in a courtroom that the Sons of Silence used violence and threats routinely. In one bar, Dobyns and Bayless were confronted by Douglas Luckett of the Sons of Silence, a huge 6' 9" man who weighted 300 pounds. Luckett aggressively told the undercover policemen: "Hey, you guys can't wear that shit around here!" Dobyns and Bayless attempted to follow ATF policy by leaving the bar, but the doorman locked the door before they could leave while Luckett attacked Dobyns. Dobyns described his fifteen-minute brawl with Luckett as the most intense fight he had ever been in as he fought ferociously against Luckett's attempts to rip off his patch. Finally, a battered and bleeding Dobyns and Bayless made it to the door while Luckett shouted: "You're dead, man. Your colors—that shit is coming off in about two seconds". Dobyns made a football tackle that knocked Luckett to the ground while he proceeded to punch Luckett in the face. Dobyns taunted Luckett as he punched him out: "Hey, my shit is still on, motherfucker!" Dobyns and Bayless finally were able to leave the bar, bruised and bleeding. A few weeks later, the ATF arrested all of the members of the three chapters of the Sons of Silence who were hit with more than 250 charges of violating federal laws on gunrunning and selling methamphetamine.

Over a two decade period, Dobyns conducted over 500 undercover operations, developing expertise in violent crime investigations, weapons and narcotics trafficking, gang infiltrations, home invasion burglary and murder-for-hire cases. He also served as an instructor at ATF's National Academy and member of the Bureau's Enhanced Undercover Program. He was repeatedly detailed to high-profile criminal and terrorism events including the Rodney King riots in Los Angeles, the Branch Davidian standoff in Waco, Texas, the Columbine High School massacre in Littleton, Colorado, and the Murrah Federal Building bombing in Oklahoma City.

=== Operation Rooster ===
In an investigation known as Operation Rooster, Dobyns and his ATF partner, Louis Quiñónez, infiltrated a faction of the Aryan Brotherhood in Arizona. Using the ruse that they were buying bombs to be used in debt collection and murders, Dobyns and Quiñónez purchased a hundred improvised explosive devices from the gang over a hundred-day period.

=== Operation Riverside ===
In September 2001, Dobyns was sent undercover to Bullhead City, Arizona as part of Operation Riverside. A number of local bounty hunters had turned to gunrunning into Mexico, leading to an ATF operation intended to end the gunrunning. Sher and Marsden wrote: "Bullhead is the kind of dusty, dirty desert town once so popular in cowboy movies. Just across the river on the Arizona border overlooking the casinos of Nevada, it's a backyard dump heap to the glitzy Vegas strip. Gun shops, seedy motels, and even seedier bars play host to boozers, bikers and bandits–just the kind of place where a cop like Jay Dobyns would fit in". Dobyns' cover story was that he was an enforcer and debt collector for the Las Vegas casinos whose job was to beat gamblers in debt to the casinos with a baseball bat while also working as a gunrunner into Mexico as a side business. Dobyns told Sher and Marsden about Bullhead: "It was nasty. I did not cross paths with anybody in that town who wasn't involved in something they shouldn't be doing". Dobyns stated: "Underneath the table, we were firearms traffickers. We buy guns, we buy bombs, we have connections in Mexico, we take them across the border. There are strict gun laws there so there is a huge markup value: a gun you buy in the United States for two hundred bucks, you can sell in Mexico for two to five times that price".

As Dobyns' reputation as a gunrunner grew, several of his clients hired him to commit murders. Dobyns recorded while wearing a wire five times someone paying him to commit a murder, which led to the ATF making a number of arrests for conspiracy to commit murder. The dominant criminal syndicate in Arizona is the Hells Angels who grew interested in the brash new gunrunner in Bullhead. Dobyns told Sher and Marsden: "I was already credible in their eyes—I didn't need an introduction. They knew more about me initially than I did about them". Dobyns found himself visited several times by the Hells Angels who told him that they wanted to be his partner as they decided he was useful to them.

=== Operation Black Biscuit ===
==== The Laughlin Run riot ====
On April 26, 2002, a deadly altercation broke out between the Hells Angels and their arch-rivals, the Mongols Motorcycle Club, in the middle of a Laughlin, Nevada casino filled with innocent bystanders, prompting federal law enforcement to open an undercover investigation called "Operation Black Biscuit", which included Dobyns. On night of April 26, 2002, Dobyns entered the Flamingo Hilton hotel where the Hells Angels were staying along with another ATF agent, Darrin Kozlowski, who posed as a gunrunner from California. Dobyns recalled: "The casino came to a stop when we walked in." Dobyns noticed that the Hells Angels were all staring at him and Kozolwski. He later learned it was because the Hells Angels suspected that he and Kozolwski were spies for the Mongols.

At the bar of the Flamingo Hilton, Dobyns first met Donald "Smitty" Smith, a powerful member of the Angels' elite Nomad chapter for Arizona. Joining him at the bar was an undercover ATF agent, Jenna Maguire, described by Sher and Marsden as a "pretty, twenty-nine year old" with "long hair and a quick smile". Maguire was to later play the part of Dobyns' girlfriend in Operation Black Biscuit. Maguire knew that Dobyns was an undercover policeman, but the meeting at the bar was the first time she met him. She told Sher and Marsden about Kozolwski and Dobyns: "Those guys looked so scary, they looked so intimidating". The brawl at the Harrah's casino between the Hells Angels and the Mongols led to the ATF pulling out several undercover agents out of the fear that they might be killed or asked to commit a murder.

The sudden withdraw of the agents made them appear cowardly and caused the Angels to lose respect for them, which led to the cancellation of Operation Five Star. Dobyns was at his house at the time the Harrah's brawl began at about 2 am, which led him to note: "I'm not burned in this". In the weeks that followed, several Hells Angels visited Dobyns at his house to discuss the Laughlin Run riot. Dobyns' major task up to that point had not been directly targeting the Hells Angels. Dobyns commented that prior to the Laughlin Run riot, the general view in the ATF headquarters in Washington was that the Hells Angels were "burned out Vietnam vets who liked to ride and use some dope", and after the riot, the general thinking in Washington were that the Hells Angels were a menace.

==== The Solo Angeles scheme ====
To infiltrate the Arizona Hells Angels, Joe Slatalla of the ATF's Phoenix office, devised a complex scheme under which a pseudo-chapter of a real Mexican outlaw biker gang, Solo Angeles Motorcycle Club, would be established in Arizona to be made up entirely of undercover officers and informers that would seek an alliance with the Hells Angels. Slatalla noted that the lengthy recruitment process required by the Hells Angels made it very difficult to infiltrate the Hells Angels and the requirement that an applicant commit various illegal acts posed major problems for undercover policemen. Slatalla devised the scheme of a pseudo-chapter made up of undercover officers and informers of an allied biker gang that would gain access to the Hells Angels enough to provide evidence for an indictment while avoiding the obstacles that normally blocked an undercover officer from joining the Hells Angels. Rudy Kramer, a biker affiliated with the Solo Angeles, had been an ATF informer since December 2001. Kramer also had a friendly relationship with the Hells Angels with whom he often bought guns from, and was close to Robert "Bad Bob" Johnson, the president of the Angels Mesa chapter. Slatalla wanted Dobyns to be the vice president of the Solo Angeles pseudo-chapter as he already had a working relationship with the Hells Angels in Bullhead. The ATF case managers on Operation Riverside were loath to lose Dobyns to Operation Black Biscuit, which led to a lengthy dispute before Dobyns was finally assigned to Black Biscuit.

Sher and Marsden wrote that Dobyns looked like an outlaw biker as he is a tall, lean man whose head is shaven bald and who wears golden earrings while his muscular body is covered with tattoos. On one of his shoulders, Dobyns had a tattoo of St. Michael, the patron saint of police officers, which led him to develop a story to explain that the tattoo of St. Michael was not of St. Michael. However, Dobyns told Sher and Marsden: "The appearance, how you look, is not a bit of value to these guys. Long hair, goatee, tattoos—they're not important to getting you in. What comes out of your mouth and what you can make them believe—that's what counts". Dobyns used the alias of Jay Davis for his assignment. Dobyns kept his real first name as he wanted a name he could respond to without a doubt while Davis was his grandmother's maiden name. Dobyns described his grandmother as a tough, hard-working woman and he used Davis as his alias as a way to honor her. Joining Dobyns were a Phoenix policeman, Billy Long, who played the part of his enforcer; Carlos Canino, a Puerto Rican ATF agent, who played the role of a Mexican drug dealer who had been ripped by a Colombian cartel and had come to America to seek his stolen cocaine; and a career criminal/ATF informer known as "Pops" whose role was to commit crimes that the undercover ATF agents could not. Legally, Dobyns and the other ATF agents could not operate in Mexico as that would violate Mexican sovereignty, so "Pops", who was only an informer, was sent to Mexico when the need arose. Dobyns said of Kramer: "Rudy is smart and stupid. Rudy could tell you a complex formula to solve a math equation, but you'd have to hold his hand to get him across the street without getting hit by a car. He was street smart, but lacked common sense".

Over nearly two years of undercover operations, Dobyns and a team of ATF agents, technicians and confidential informants infiltrated the Hells Angels, primarily in Arizona. Dobyns posed as a gunrunner and member of the Solo Angeles interested in joining the Angels. In late July 2002, Kramer introduced Dobyns and the other pseudo-Solo Angeles at a biker rally to Denis Denbesten of the Angels Nomad Arizona chapter. Kramer assured Denbesten: "We're not here to steal any of your thunder. We got our own business out of Mexico, moving guns out of Arizona to Mexico. We're not here to take any of your dope business". Dobyns said of the first meeting: "I think they liked the fact that we respected the protocol". On August 1, 2002, Kramer introduced Dobyns to Johnson. The meeting with Johnson, which began at 9 pm at the Mesa chapter's clubhouse, went well, and by 11 pm, Dobyns had invited to drink at the Spirts Lounge, a favorite bar of the Hells Angels. The meeting ended with Johnson telling Kramer the Solo Angeles "were welcome to traffic narcotics in Arizona with the Hells Angels support" and had permission to wear the Solo Angeles patch in Arizona.

On August 9, 2002, Dobyns met Smith and Denbesten at the Inferno bar in Bullhead. Smith told Dobyns: "The Hells Angels own this territory. Anything you guys are going to do here you need to run it through me". Kramer then admitted that even though he was a member of the Solo Angeles, he did not have permission to wear their patch in Arizona. Dobyns, Kramer and Canino flew out to Los Angeles to meet "the Teacher", a member of the Solo Angeles. Dobyns stated: "We played him very carefully. Respect with just a mix of danger and fear, enough of each for him to like us and fear us at the same time". "The Teacher" agreed to tell anyone who asked that the pseudo-chapter had permission to wear the Solo Angeles patch in Arizona. Dobyns knew that Johnson would check with "The Teacher" about the status of the Arizona Solo Angeles; what he did not count on was that Johnson had rivals within the Hells Angels who would dig deeper into their cover stories as a way to discredit him. On August 20, 2002, Dobyns met with Smith who spoke frankly about his role in the casino battle and that he assumed that he would be indicted for first-degree murder soon. The next day, Smith told Dobyns that Debestern was a "renowned narcotics cook" and stated that he was the best maker of methamphetamine in the entire Southwest.

On September 6, 2002, Kramer was arrested by the Arizona police near a methamphetamine lab with drug paraphernalia inside his car. Kramer's drug addiction problems had made him into a liability for the Black Biscuit operation. Slatalla had the gun charges which Kramer had been arrested for in 2001 restated. With Kramer arrested, Dobyns took over the part of the Solo Angeles Arizona chapter president. On September 9, 2002, Canino and Dobyns met with Craig Kelly, the president of the Angels Tucson chapter, along with another Angel of the Tucson chapter, Douglas Dam, at Kelly's house. Neither men were legally permitted to own guns as Kelly had spent sixteen years in prison for murdering his wife's lover in a jealous rage while Dam had been to prison four times in his native Massachusetts. Despite the lifetime weapons ban, both Dam and Kelly offered to sell to Canino and Dobyns "handguns and AK-type assault rifles" as Dobyns put it in a report. The next day at his house, Dam showed Dobyns and Canino a .38 calibre revolver and a 9 mm caliber semi-automatic handgun. Of the latter gun, Dam stated it was not for sale because "the gun was used in a serious crime and it needs to go in the river". Later the same day, Slatalla was angry with Dobyns and Canino for losing their cover team on their way to Dam's house, which marked the beginning of a stained relationship between Slatalla and his undercover team. Canino, who played the part of Dobyns' sidekick, was reassigned to the Miami ATF office later in September 2002, removing him from the operation.

The Angels had become suspicious of Dobyns when he refused to have sex with the 18-year-old girl they had offered him as a gift at one of their parties, which led to rumors that he was gay. Dobyns stated: "For me in my undercover role to say no to this young attractive women, it was weird. 'What are you talking about, you're not interested in her? What the fuck's up with this dude—he doesn't like chicks? What's the deal?'" As a married man, Dobyns asked his superiors to assign a female ATF agent to play his girlfriend as he knew that the Angels disliked dealing with men rumored to be gay. However, it proved difficult to find a female ATF agent willing to play the part of a subservient "biker girl". Dobyns stated: "It takes a unique and special person with extraordinary self-confidence to operate comfortably in the HA environment, especially for women. Tension, violence and sexuality are in the air at all times around these guys". Dobyns recruited Jenna Maguire to play the part of his girlfriend to end the rumors about his sexuality. At the Inferno bar in Bullhead, Maguire appeared with Dobyns as his new girlfriend Genevieve to meet Smith and his wife Lydia. When Smith suggested that Maguire appear in a wet T-shirt contest with half of her winnings to go to him, Maguire shot back with much anger: "I'm not showing my tits in some wet T-shirt contest so you can put money in your pocket". Dobyns commented: "She wasn't going to be some barstool whore. She conducted herself with dignity".

==== Allies and rivals ====
Of the Angel leaders in Arizona, Robert "Mesa Bob" Johnson, the president of the Mesa chapter, was far more welcoming to the Solo Angeles operating in Arizona than Daniel "Hoover" Seybert, the president of the Cave Creek chapter. On November 5, 2002, Johnson told Dobyns: "Hoover is just like me. We have our fingers in everything". Johnson then phoned Seybert on his cell phone to tell him that the Solo Angeles were his guests and would be allowed to operate in Arizona with the Hells Angels taking a cut of their profits; Seybert replied that the Solo Angeles could operate in Arizona and were welcome to visit him at the Cave Creek chapter clubhouse. Johnson was one of the most powerful Hells Angels in Arizona with a long criminal record for extortion, aggravated assault, drug possession and domestic abuse. Standing 6'5", Johnson cut an intimidating figure.

In January 2003, after a party, Dobyns, Maguire, Dam and several other Hells Angels were pulled over by the Bullhead police on the suspicion of drunk driving. The Bullhead police, who were unaware that Dobyns was an undercover policeman, were more interested in frisking the new Solo Angeles chapter president than Dam, the sergeant-at-arms of the Angels Tucson chapter. The way that the police treated Dobyns in an unfriendly fashion increased his credibility with the Angels. At a party at the Desert Flame Lounge in Apache Junction on January 21, 2003, Johnson told Dobyns that he had "hung his ass out" to have the other Hells Angels chapter presidents accept the Solo Angeles in Arizona. Dobyns told Sher and Marsden in 2006; "The HAs warmed to me because I did not overtly try to impress them. I let them see what I knew they would like—confidence, character, intelligence, money, loyalty, courage, pride—and then I stood back and let them come to me". Dobyns became sufficiently well-accepted that he was allowed to bring his guns into the Hells Angels clubhouses which non-members are not normally allowed to do. Dobyns said: "I would always say, 'I'm a debt collector; people don't like me; people are pissed off at me', so I keep my guns with me". Dobyns was allowed to bring in guns under the grounds that he was "cool". In February 2003, Dobyns was allowed to take part in the Angels' Prison Run where the Angels rode their motorcycles from Arizona down 80 miles of desert highway to the federal prison in Florence, Colorado which they would then ride around. Dobyns said of the Prison Run: "You have convicts being honored by a criminal organization. I don't know how it exists, don't know why it exists. I don't know why it continues to exist". Dobyns complained that he often rode his motorcycle around with his handguns visible, which though legal in Arizona, should have been grounds for suspicion, but was never pulled over the police who regarded it as normal for outlaw bikers to ride around with guns in plain sight.

In February 2003, Dobyns received a phone call from Slatalla telling him to leave his home at once and report to the ATF office. Upon arriving, Dobyns learned that the Drug Enforcement Administration (DEA) had an informer in the Phoenix Hells Angels chapter and that the informer had learned that Robert "Chico" Mora, the president of the Angels Phoenix chapter, had decided to kill the entire Solo Angeles Arizona chapter. Mora was a huge, 6' 3" man who weighed 300 pounds and who had gone to prison for killing two men. During his time in prison, Mora was the Arizona prison boxing champion and was an expert with using knives, swords and a whip. Dobyns said of Mora: "He was definitely the most feared biker in Arizona and one of the most feared bikers in the west. He's just a big, bad dude. Of the ten Hells Angels I had to stay clear of, he was probably number one on my list. I didn't want him to take my head off in some bar". Mora had done a background check on the Arizona Solo Angeles chapter and discovered that most of the real Solo Angeles in California had never heard of the Arizona chapter and that Dobyns had never been to Tijuana, the headquarters of the Solo Angeles. Dobyns believed that Operation Black Biscuit was over, but decided to make a desperate ploy to salvage the operation by meeting Johnson. On February 28, 2003, Dobyns met with Johnson to deny Mora's allegations, which he rebutted by showing Johnson a photograph of him at a Solo Angeles run in California along with another photo of him standing behind a Solo Angeles leader during a television interview. Johnson was convinced and phoned Mora to tell him: "Hey, you know what? You're wrong on this. I got physical evidence that these guys are legit, so I don't know where your sources are, but you stand down". To appease Mora, Johnson told Dobyns that he could no longer operate in Phoenix, which led him to leave that city. During a visit to Smith at the Inferno Lounge in Bullhead, his hosts suggested to Dobyns that he "patch over" to join the Hells Angels.

Dobyns was so widely accepted by the Hells Angels that at a party at the clubhouse of the Cave Creek chapter, he met Sonny Barger, the leader of the Hells Angels. Dobyns said of Barger: "He's the shot caller, the deal broker. His reputation precedes him, so when people talk to him they know who they're talking to. Without a doubt you know that he's the Guy. He's very personable, he's charming. You can see how he developed this club. He's a politician. He's a salesman". At their first meeting, Barger, speaking though his tracheotomy, told him: "Glad to have you here. You're a great friend to us. We need to see you around more. Come around more. We want to see more of you at Cave Creek". Seeing a chance to ultimately humiliate Barger, Dobyns posed with him in a photograph. Dobyns noted the younger Hells Angels were divided about Barger with some seeing him as a legendary figure while others held him in contempt as a "pussy" and as a selfish man only concerned with "promoting himself, promoting his books, his movies, his products" as Dobyns put it. On March 22, 2003, Seybert, the nominal president of the Cave Creek chapter, was murdered. The fact that there was no revenge attacks against the Mongols, as normally would be the case when the Mongols killed an Angel chapter president, gave rise to the suspicion that Seybert had been killed by his fellow Angels. The degree of internal feuding within the Hells Angels increased the tension for Dobyns as he noted there were murderous feuds within the group.

At a party at his house, Smith told a secretly bemused Dobyns about how the Sons of Silence had been smashed by the ATF in 1999 due to an undercover agent and told him that such an infiltration would never happen to the Angels. During visits to the Cave Creek chapter clubhouse, Mora made no effort to hide his hatred of Dobyns, whom he still believed to be an undercover policeman. Dobyns stated: "Chico was the one guy that really had it figured out. But if everyone in the insane asylum says you're the crazy one, then you're the crazy one. And that's what happened to Chico. He was the one who understood it, but the whole club said, 'you're wrong.'" Despite his acceptance by the Hells Angels, Dobyns noted that the Angels were always paranoid about the possibility of an undercover policeman in their ranks and on one occasion had a gun pointed to his gun and told to strip to prove that he was not wearing a wire. Dobyns rarely wore a wire and instead used bugs planted his cellphone and pager to record his conversations with the Angels. Dobyns was investigated three times by private detectives hired by the Hells Angels who were always on the lookout for any undercover policemen, but each time the private detectives stated that Dobyns was really was "Jay Davis", gunrunner and drug dealer.

To spend time with his children, Dobyns told the Angels he was divorced and that his ex-wife only allowed his children to visit him occasionally to explain why his son and daughter were infrequently seen. In Tucson, Dobyns was leaving a guitar shop with his 12-year-old daughter, Dale, when he bumped into Robert McKay, the president of the Hells Angels Tucson chapter on the street. Dobyns whispered to Dale: "Go along with what I say". After the meeting ended, Dobyns thanked his daughter for her role-playing as she pretended that her father was an outlaw biker instead of a policeman and then added: "Do not tell your mother. Do not tell your mother that you met this guy because she's going to be pissed off." On March 11, 2003, Dobyns told MacKay that he had been hired to beat a "playboy" who was in arrears with a Las Vegas casino and asked if MacKay would like to join him. On March 12, 2003, Dobyns and MacKay went to confront Eric Rutland, an undercover ATF agent who played the part of the "playboy" at a Waffle House restaurant in Tucson. At the meeting, Dobyns made various threats to Rutland who fearfully wrote him a check for $17,000. Dobyns gave MacKay $200 for merely being present at the meeting, and in the following days found himself besieged by various Hells Angels who wanted to join him in his debt collection work. MacKay suggested to Dobyns that he start using an electric cattle prod in his debt collection work to torture deadbeats and stated that he himself used a Taser when torturing people in his own debt collection work. MacKay further suggested to Dobyns that he should join the Hells Angels, saying he was willing to accept Dobyns into his chapter.

Dobyns befriended various members of the Skull Valley Angels chapter as part of his undercover work. On April 18, 2003, Dobyns visited Las Vegas with Bobby Reinstra, the sergeant-at-arms of the Skull Valley chapter. The security guards at the four star Hard Rock Café Hotel and Casino refused to allow the Hells Angels to enter wearing their gang colors, which led Dobyns to make a call with the Las Vegas police to ask them to pressure the hotel staff to allow them to enter wearing their gang colors. The other Angels were greatly impressed when the hotel permitted the Angels to enter wearing their colors, which was seen as an example of the influence of "Jay Davis".

Dobyns asked the Las Vegas police to provide an officer to play the part of a Mafia boss for a meeting with Reinstra during the same visit. At the meeting, the man known as Lou played the part of an abrasive, loudmouth Vegas Mafia boss perfectly and discussed selling guns to the Hells Angels. After the meeting, Dobyns learned that Lou was not a policeman, but instead a real gangster from New Jersey who had turned state's evidence after being arrested in Las Vegas. The next day, Lou delivered various illegal guns, such as AK-47 assault rifles, MAC-10 pistols and an Uzi submachine gun, to Dobyns and Reinstra. After the meeting with Lou, Reinstra told Dobyns that he was into "extortion, loan sharking and prostitution—you know, racketeering". Reinstra told Dobyns that he was a "rat hunter" (i.e. someone who had killed informers) and a good killer. Reinstra added: "Some call it stupidity, but it takes balls to walk up and shoot someone between the eyes. There are few people that can live with that".

==== The stress of undercover work ====
Dobyns described undercover work as intensely stressful as he had to pretend to be someone that he was not for two years and was always in fear that he might be discovered. Dobyns stayed in contact with Bayless whose task was "make sure my head was right" as Dobyns phrased it. Despite his superficial friendship with the Hells Angels, he privately held them in contempt as "degenerate shitheads," saying, "they disgust me and they need to be in jail". Dobyns admitted that undercover work was psychologically draining as: "Trying to keep your brain spinning two or three conversations ahead of time, for eight hours a time, you are physically, mentally, emotionally ripped. To do that day after day and month after month is nearly impossible". Dobyns always refused offers to use methamphetamine, which most of the Hells Angels used regularly, and pointed to his tattoo of St. Michael slaying the dragon, which he explained represented the triumph of his willpower over evil. Dobyns claimed to be a former heroin addict who had been homeless and that he did not wish to engage in substance abuse again.

Dobyns defended Maguire from the sexual advances of the Hells Angels, but he noted there was nothing he could to do to protect the girlfriends/wives of the Hells Angels who routinely engaged in verbal, physical and sexual abuse of their women. Dobyns and Maguire both described the "biker girls" as women of low self-esteem whose sense of self-worth was only measured in terms of being associated with the Hells Angels. As such, the "biker girls" were willing to endure any abuse from their boyfriends/husbands as the price of being associated with the Angels. Dobyns observed that when the wife of one Hells Angel was late in bringing him the food he had ordered from a restaurant, he proceeded to beat her bloody without mercy while the other Angels cheered him on. Dobyns observed that the worst aspect of being an undercover policeman was watching the Hells Angels beat their children bloody and not being able to do anything to stop it without blowing his cover. When the 11-year-old son of a Hells Angel came in crying saying that the other children had squirted water in his face, his father called him a "big, fat piece of shit" and a "pussy". To Dobyns' horror, he beat his son bloody to teach him not to be a "pussy".

Much to his own chagrin, the children in the poor neighborhood where Dobyns operated out of idolized him as a successful criminal. Dobyns stated: "I don't think we did any service to those kids... They always wanted to hang with us. For the wrong reason, they worshipped us". He told the children not to aspire to be an outlaw biker and to "get an education", advice he sadly noted was ignored as all of the neighborhood children wanted to be outlaw bikers or "biker girls" when they grew up. Owing to the stress of undercover work, Dobyns started to drink and smoke heavily. Under the cover story of doing debt collection work in California, Dobyns would visit his wife and children. Dobyns noted that his children resented him being away for so long as he commented: "All they [his children] want is for their dad to be there and love him. And I wasn't there".

Additionally, Dobyns had much tension in his relationship with his superior Slatalla. Slatalla told Dobyns: "You only understand 10 percent of what's going on in this case. You're only dealing with 10 percent of the big picture. I'm dealing with 100 percent". Dobyns replied: "That may be the case, but if you make a mistake, you can go back and rewrite a report and fix something. If I make a mistake, I'm going to get hit on the back of my head with a pipe. I'm trying to focus my energy on the 10 percent that's going to keep me and my partners alive. That 10 percent takes 1000 percent of my energy".

==== Joining the Angels ====
Several times, Dobyns was invited to join the Hells Angels. Finally, he was told: "You're either going to be a Hells Angel or you're going to get the fuck out of this state!" On April 13, 2003, George Walters, a member of the Skull Valley chapter, met with Dobyns to give him a tab to place on his biker's vest to show that the Solo Angeles were now affiliated with his chapter. On May 31, 2003, Dobyns became a "prospect" (the second level in an outlaw biker club) with the Skull Valley chapter. The Skull Valley chapter had fallen down to four members, and Hells Angels rules state that a chapter must have six members at all times or lose its charter. Teddy Toth, the president of the Skull Valley chapter, was desperate to take in new members to keep his chapter going, hence his willingness to place Dobyns and the other Solo Angeles on the "fast track" to join his chapter.

Slatalla was strongly opposed to Dobyns joining the Hells Angels, which he believed would compromise the operation, while Dobyns was very much for taking up the offer, which led to a heated dispute. Slatalla felt Dobyns had obtained enough evidence to bring Racketeer Influenced and Corrupt Organizations Act (RICO) charges against the Hells Angels, which would make Dobyns joining the Hells Angels unnecessary and delay bringing charges by another year or so. Dobyns by contrast felt the operation should be taken further as he believed he would learn more about the criminal activities of the Hells Angels by becoming a "full patch" member. There was continuing tension within the ATF between field agents versus managers. Sher and Marsden wrote that the ATF managers were interested in "results that can be measured" such as arrests and convictions and as such disliked lengthy undercover operations which consumed both time and money while denying laying charges by years. In a compromise, Slatalla decided that Dobyns could join the Hells Angels, but that charges would be filed on July 8, 2003. Dobyns described the life of a "prospect" as a demeaning one where he was forced to be at the beck and call of the Hells Angels and perform menial jobs for them at all hours. On June 12, 2003, Dobyns was called in to start preparing for violence as the Hells Angels had heard a rumor that the Bandidos were planning to crash a biker meeting in Las Vegas that night. The Hells Angels armed themselves for the meeting, and during the drive to Las Vegas, Dobyns phoned Slatalla to ask him to have a strong police presence at the meeting place as he legally could not commit a murder as a policeman and did not wish to blow his cover story. Dobyns was placed as part of an armed security detail at the meeting and was told to "smoke" any Bandidos that he saw on sight. But the heavy police presence placed by Slatalla deterred the Bandidos from showing up.

To earn his "patch" (full membership into the club) and further establish his credibility as a potential member ("prospect") with the club's leadership, Dobyns staged the fake "murder" of a member of the rival Mongols. Dobyns had been told that it was Angel policy: "You see a Mongol, its your responsibility is to kill him". Dobyns told Toth and the other Angels of the Skull Valley chapter that he planned to kill a Mongol in Mexico. Dobyns asked Joby Walters of the Skull Valley chapter for a gun, which he provided. Dobyns did not go to Mexico as he claimed he did, and instead stayed in Arizona with his wife and children. Dobyns claimed in a phone call to Toth that "Pops", the informer who was clearly showing the strain of undercover work, had tried to kill a Mongol and had been killed in turn. The claim had been intended to ease "Pops" out of undercover work before he had a nervous breakdown. A law enforcement officer posing as the Mongols biker was splattered with lamb blood and brains, photographed and videotaped lying in a shallow grave. Dobyns had a bloodstained Mongols "cut" (leather biker vest with club patches) mailed to the Hells Angels from somewhere in Mexico, and provided a videotape and pictures of the "killing". Dobyns told Toth and Reinstra a highly graphic account of the supposed murder in Mexico and obtained their approval. Toth told Dobyns: "You did what it takes. Welcome, you're a Hells Angels now". Walters told Dobyns that the Solo Angeles would formally join the Hells Angels in August 2003 and that they had Barger's approval. According to Dobyns and the ATF, the Hells Angels leadership voted Dobyns in as a full "patched" member of the club two days after the staged killing, forgoing a required year-long probation period for prospective members. Although awarded his Hells Angels vest by the leadership of the Skull Valley chapter, the club, including its leader, Sonny Barger, have vehemently denied that Dobyns was ever "patched-in". Barger's denial is supported by Dobyns' book, No Angel, in which Dobyns states that the vest that was draped over his back belonged to another member and that full Hells Angels membership required approval from the entire organization, which they were unlikely to get at that point.

Dobyns' superiors in the ATF wanted to bring charges as soon as possible as they felt that they had enough evidence for RICO charges and felt the fake murder was a waste of money and time. Dobyns wanted to keep the operation going as he believed he would obtain more information as a better trusted "full patch" Hells Angel who had killed a man. Slatalla wanted to close Operation Black Biscuit as he wanted to have charges pressed as soon as possible, and did not want to wait an extra year or two for Dobyns to provide more evidence in the role of a "full patch" Hells Angel. Dobyns compared Operation Black Biscuit to running a marathon and compared stopping the operation to ending the marathon short of a few miles of the finishing mark. Dobyns stated: "You know it's going to be painful. It's going to suck, I'm going to hurt, I'm going to pay for it afterwards. But I'm going to run the six more miles I need to finish it".

==== After Black Biscuit ====
On July 8, 2003, Operation Black Biscuit came to an end with Hells Angels being arrested in Tucson, Phoenix, Prescott, Kingman and Bullhead on various drug, guns, and conspiracy charges. To protect him and his family, Dobyns, his wife, and his children were all sent out of Arizona at the time of the raids. Dobyns admits that readjusting to being a husband and father again was difficult as: "I was a mess at that point". Dobyns told Sher and Marsden: "I did some serious, serious damage to my family and I don't feel one bit of good about that. They're still trying to recover from what happened. I lost their confidence". Slattala told Sher and Marsden that the Hells Angels had learned from their mistake with Dobyns and: "It won't happen again".

On their website, the Hells Angels posted photographs of the "Arizona Rats" as they called the pseudo-chapter of the Solo Angeles including Dobyns, along with the message: "Hope all is well. Snitches are a dying breed. Get it?" Barger told the media: "It's too bad they get with what they are doing". On August 30, 2003, Dobyns went with his fellow ATF agent Darrin Kozolowski to the Club Congress bar in Tucson. While there, Dobyns happened to run into MacKay, who was out on bail, and who expressed much hatred of him. MacKay walked up to Dobyns and shouted much abuse at him while Dobyns taunted him over the way he had fooled him. Despite his bluster and rage, MacKay finally walked away, but shouted: "You're going to get hurt!" The next day, MacKay was arrested for making death threats while his bail was revoked. MacKay insisted there was no witnesses to the incident and discovered to his own shock that Kozolowski, whom he believed to be another biker, was also an ATF agent. The incident forced Dobyns and his family to temporarily leave Arizona, which caused his family much anguish. Dobyns told Sher and Marsden: "My family loves it here. Again, my family is going take the hit for what I do for a living. My family is going to pay the price for it". In 2005, Dobyns and his family were forced to relocate yet again when the Hells Angels placed a contract on his life with the Aryan Brotherhood.

Although the "Black Biscuit" investigation was deemed "successful" by ATF and yielded numerous criminal indictments for RICO violations and other felony charges, internal government disagreement ultimately led to some of the primary defendants receiving reduced sentences or having their charges dismissed. In September 2005, the judge overseeing the case harshly criticized the Department of Justice for "legally incorrect" disclosure of information to the defense lawyers as the judge ruled that the prosecution had not complied with the requests of the defense lawyers for disclosure. The judge's ruling was felt to weaken the Justice Department's case, which made the prosecution open to plea bargains. On February 17, 2006, the majority of the Hells Angels charged in Operation Black Biscuit made plea bargains where they pledged guilty to lesser charges in exchange for the RICO charges being dropped. Johnson told the media after his plea bargain that Dobyns and the others were "damned good actors". Toth pleaded guilty to obstruction of justice in exchange for the RICO charges being dropped. Mora, the Hells Angel who accused Dobyns of being an undercover policeman, was convicted of the possession of weapons forbidden to a felon.

=== Death threats and lawsuit ===
In 2004, following the exposure of his true identity during the "Black Biscuit" prosecutions, Dobyns and his family became the targets of death threats by various organizations, including members and associates of the Hells Angels, Aryan Brotherhood and MS-13. According to official investigative reports by government watchdog agencies, ATF management failed to take reasonable measures to protect Dobyns and his family from numerous validated death and violence threats.

ATF management unmasked/withdrew the Dobyns family's "backstopping" (protective countermeasures; residence address, untraceable drivers licenses and vehicle registrations, etc.) claiming that the backstop measures were no longer justified. Dobyns alleged that this was done illegally and in retaliation for his whistleblowing on ATF's failure to assist in protecting undercover agents.

On August 10, 2008, four months after ATF forced the location of his home into the public domain, his Tucson residence was the target of a late night arson attack while his wife and two children were asleep inside. They escaped with only smoke inhalation injuries, but the ensuing fire destroyed the home and most of the family's belongings.

ATF executives insisted that focus be placed on Dobyns as the primary suspect in the arson of his own home in spite of investigators conclusions otherwise and credible evidence indicating the involvement of other known suspects. Dobyns filed multiple lawsuits winning a trial court victory in 2014. That verdict was appealed to the United States Supreme Court but the case was declined to be heard.

United States Court of Federal Claims Judge Francis Allegra 54-page verdict laid blame on ATF for retaliation and endangerment for the Bureau's failed attempts to frame Dobyns. Allegra ruled that ATF was corrupt in attempting to cover up its conduct by withholding evidence and using perjured testimony. Allegra wrote in his final opinion: "The United States wins its point whenever justice is done its citizens in the courts. ...words now carved into the office rotunda of the Attorney General. Presumably, what holds true for the citizenry in general ought to hold true for Federal agents who risk their lives in law enforcement. But if that is so, how does one explain this case? Unfortunately, how certain ATF officials acted in the aftermath of the [Dobyns] Settlement Agreement bears little resemblance to the lofty sayings carved into the facades of the Department of Justice. Experiences like these unfortunately bring to mind those that Agent Dobyns experienced in the years following the execution of the Settlement Agreement – a time that should have been one of healing and reconciliation, but that instead gave certain ATF officials and agents the opportunity to harm Agent Dobyns further. In the court's view, the actions of these ATF employees indisputably breached the covenant of good faith and fair dealing."

The Office of the Inspector General and the United States Office of Special Counsel concluded that, "ATF needlessly and inappropriately delayed its response to, and investigation of, threats against its own agent."

=== Decorations and awards ===
Dobyns has received the United States Attorney General's Medal of Valor, twelve ATF Special Act Awards for investigative excellence, two ATF Gold Stars for critical injuries received during investigative operations, an ATF Distinguished Service Medal for outstanding investigative accomplishment, the ATF Academy's Eddie Benetez award honoring exceptional physical fitness, the International Narcotics Officers Association Medal of Valor, the 2004 National Association of Police Officers "Top Cop" Award, the International Outlaw Motorcycle Gang Investigators Association Undercover Achievement Award, and the Australian Law Enforcement Practitioners Significant Infiltration Award.

== Notoriety ==
=== Bestselling author ===
In February 2009, Dobyns became a New York Times bestselling author following the release of his book, No Angel: My Harrowing Undercover Journey to the Inner Circle of the Hells Angels. The book chronicles the Hells Angels investigation and how it impacted his life and career.

Dobyns' Hells Angels exploits are also memorialized in the books Angels of Death, by Julian Sher and William Marsden, and Running with the Devil, by Kerrie Droban.

In 2017, Dobyns published his prequel/sequel story to No Angel, titled Catching Hell: A True Story of Abandonment and Betrayal.

=== Film and television ===
Dobyns has been featured in television documentaries produced by The History Channel, including the Gangland episode "Behind Enemy Lines", America's Book of Secrets, the National Geographic Channel's "Inside: Outlaw Bikers – Hells Angels", Fox Television's " America's Most Wanted", and Investigation Discovery's "Deadly Devotions" detailing his involvement in an investigation of a murder committed by the Hells Angels. In 2015 Dobyns appeared in six episodes of the television series "Outlaw Chronicles", and, 2016, he was featured as the pilot episode of the program "Deep Undercover" (Operation Black Biscuit: Infiltrating The Hells Angels) and two additional episodes detailing undercover investigations he participated in (Operation Nevada Volenteers: Sin City Bomber/Operation Rooster: Aryan Brotherhood).

Dobyns has appeared in several feature films, most notably alongside actors Gerard Butler, O'Shea Jackson, Pablo Schreiber and Eric Braeden in the film Den of Thieves. Dobyns' physical appearance has also served as inspiration for actors in films, including Barry Pepper in Snitch and Joe Manganiello in Sabotage.

Dobyns has appeared on national news programs such as Anderson Cooper 360 (CNN), Fox News, The FOX Report with Shepard Smith (FOX), and many others, discussing the death threats he has received, the federal government's failures related to those situations, and his status as a whistleblower. He has also been featured in Newsweek Magazine, The Washington Post, The Wall Street Journal, and on National Public Radio.

Dobyns hosts a podcast titled Copland, promoting heroic stories of those in law enforcement, fire services and the military.

== Current activities ==
Dobyns retired from the ATF in January 2014. He owns and operates the Jay Dobyns Group, focused on law enforcement training. Dobyns works as a public speaker on law enforcement topics and instructs classes on undercover work as an adjunct professor at the University of Arizona. He also acts as a consultant to the film and television industry.

Dobyns coached youth sports for twenty-five years including three years (2020 to 2022) as the Head Football Coach at Tanque Verde High School. Upon his resignation in November 2022, the "Coach of the Year" award was named after Dobyns.

== Notes ==
1. ^ "HHS – Vice Admiral Richard H. Carmona, M.D., M.P.H., F.A.C.S., Surgeon General". Hhs.gov. 2003-11-10. Retrieved 2011-10-10.
2. ^ a b "Biography & C.V". Jay Dobyns. Retrieved 2011-10-10.
3. ^ a b "Julian Sher.com". Julian Sher.com. Retrieved 2011-10-10.
4. ^ "CNN.com, Federal agent penetrated Hells Angels, fears for his life, February 6, 2007". Cnn.com. 2007-02-05. Retrieved 2011-10-10.
5. ^ Wagner, Dennis (2008-08-17). "Officials mum about fire at ATF Agent's home, August 17, 2008". Azcentral.com. Retrieved 2011-10-10.
6. ^ http://roadwaytocollege.com/go/page.pl/000000A/http/www.osc.gov/FY2009/Scanned/09-19=2520DI-07-0367/09-19=2520DI-07-0367=2520Ltr=2520to=2520President.pdf
7. ^ "FY 2009 Public File". Osc.gov. Retrieved 2011-10-10.
8. ^ "The FOX Report With Shepard Smith – Wednesday, Jul 01, 2009 – mReplay Livedash TV Transcript – Livedash – Search what is being mentioned across national TV". Livedash. Retrieved 2011-10-10.
9. ^ "Federal agent penetrated Hells Angels, fears for his life – CNN". Articles.cnn.com. 2007-02-05. Retrieved 2011-10-10.
10. ^ Eve Conant (2009-03-06). "A Very Hellish Journey – The Daily Beast". Newsweek.com. Retrieved 2011-10-10.
11. ^ "Still Catching Hell: Undercover No More, Jay Dobyns Revs Up for a New Fight". Washingtonpost.com. Retrieved 2011-10-10.
12. ^ Trachtenberg, Jeffrey A. (2009-03-04). "'No Angel' Author's Undercover Mission – WSJ.com". Online.wsj.com. Retrieved 2011-10-10.
13. ^ "Monday, June 8, 2009 | The Diane Rehm Show from WAMU and NPR". The Diane Rehm Show. 2009-06-08. Retrieved 2011-10-10.
14. ^ "Random House / Crown Publishing Group". Randomhouse.com. Retrieved 2011-10-10.
15. ^ "The New York Times Best Seller List, March 8, 2009" (PDF). Retrieved 2011-10-10.
16. ^ "Jay Dobyns Group, LLC". Jaydobyns.com. Retrieved 2011-10-10.
17. ^ "Running With the Devil". Kerrie Droban. Retrieved 2011-10-10.
18. ^ The History Club Membership. "Gangland Behind Enemy Lines DVD – History Store". Shop.history.com. Retrieved 2011-10-10.
19. ^ USA. "National Geographic Channel". Channel.nationalgeographic.com. Retrieved 2011-10-10.
20. ^
21. ^ "SHS Cougar Foundation Hall of Fame". Sahuaro78.com. Retrieved 2011-10-10.
22. ^ "Pima County Sports Hall of Fame Inductees". Pcshf.org. Retrieved 2011-10-10.
23. ^ https://web.archive.org/web/20061014120152/http://www.frankserpico.com/
24. ^ "FBI – Using Intel to Stop the Mob – Agent Pistone". Fbi.gov. 1981-07-26. Retrieved 2011-10-10.
25. ^ Griffin, Dennis. "Covert: My Years Infiltrating the Mob (9781402754432): Bob Delaney, Dave Scheiber, Bill Walton: Books". Amazon.com. Retrieved 2011-10-10.
26. ^ "William Queen". Menstuff.org. 2006-12-24. Retrieved 2011-10-10.
27. ^ "60 Minutes: FBI Wiseguy Fooled The Mob". CBS News. Retrieved 2011-10-10.
