= Tucker Tooley =

American film producer

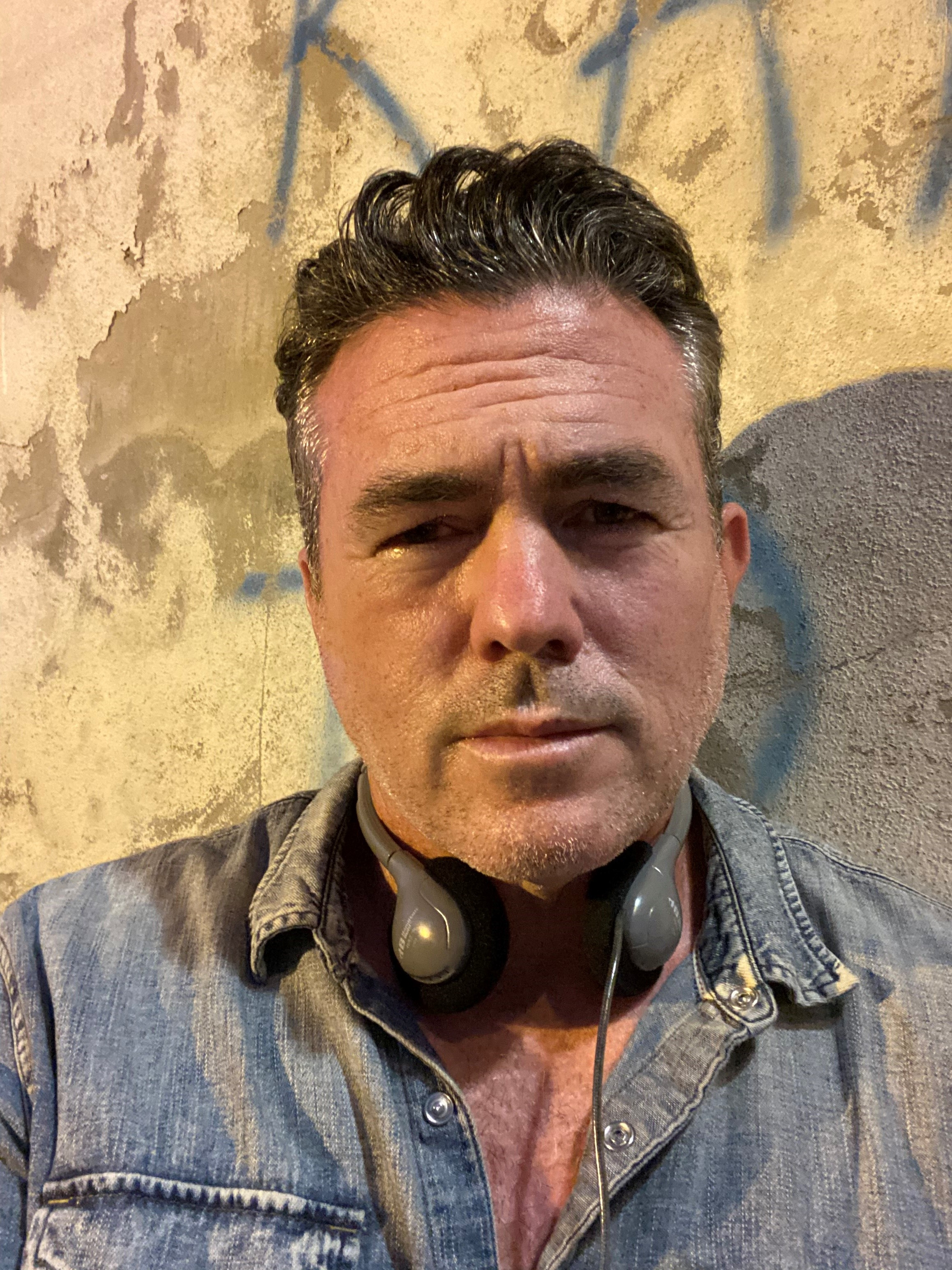
- Born: California, United States
- Education: University of California, Santa Barbara
- Occupation: CEO Film producer
- Years active: 1997–present
- Spouse: Tessa Menefee Benson (m. 2012)

Tucker Tooley is an American film producer. He is the CEO of Tooley Productions LLC.

== Early life and education ==
Tooley was born in California.

Tooley earned his B.A. at the University of California, Santa Barbara.

== Career ==
Tucker Tooley is an American film producer. He is the CEO of Tucker Tooley Entertainment, a feature film and television finance and production company established by Tooley and Greg Renker. As of February 2024, Tooley’s films have earned more than $2.5 billion at the worldwide box office.

The company is set to release four feature films in 2024 including Arthur The King (March 15, 2024) with Lionsgate, starring Mark Wahlberg; The Deliverance with Netflix, director Lee Daniels’ elevated horror film starring Andra Day and Glenn Close; Den of Thieves 2: Pantera, starring Gerard Butler and O’Shea Jackson Jr. with director Christian Gudegast returning for the sequel to the successful heist thriller; and Finding Satoshi, a premium documentary that explores the mysterious founder of Bitcoin and the larger state of cryptocurrency with the help of best-selling author and financial journalist William D. Cohan.

Tooley began his film career as a creative executive at Interlight Pictures. The first film he financed was 6 Below: Miracle on the Mountain, based on the memoir by Eric LeMarque. The film, starring Josh Hartnett, was released in October 2017. From 1997 to 2003, Tooley ran production company Newman/Tooley Films with Vincent Newman, producing a slate of independent and studio movies. He founded Tooley Productions in 2003, where he oversees the creative and financial aspects of all film development and production.

In 2007, Tooley joined Relativity as President of Worldwide Production at Relativity Studios where he played a role in the acquisition of Overture Films’ marketing and distribution operations, transforming Relativity from a slate financing entity into a full-fledged independent studio.

In 2011, Tooley was promoted to President of the company and was responsible for overseeing day-to-day operations. Under Tooley's leadership, the studio earned numerous Oscar and Golden Globe nominations and three of its releases opened number one at the box office.

While at Relativity, Tooley was an early advocate for and executive produced David O. Russell's The Fighter, which earned seven Oscar nominations and won two. Also, he produced or executive produced Neil Burger’s Limitless, starring Bradley Cooper, and the action-thriller Act of Valor which both opened number one at the domestic box office. Other credits include Dear John, starring Channing Tatum and Amanda Seyfried; Nicholas Sparks’ Safe Haven; and Steven Soderbergh’s Haywire.

In October 2015, Tooley left the company. In 2018, Tooley appeared in the documentary Making Montgomery Clift.

After leaving Relativity, Tooley returned to producing under his own banner.

Tooley produced Hulu's The United States Vs. Billie Holiday, starring Andra Day, for which Day was nominated for an Academy Award.

Tooley is a Member of the Producers Branch of the Academy of Motion Picture Arts and Sciences as well as the Producers Guild of America.

== Recognition and awards ==
In 2009 he was named “Executive of the Year” by the Ischia Global Film & Music Festival.

== Other roles and affiliations ==
Tooley is a Member of the Academy of Motion Picture Arts & Sciences as well as the Producers Guild of America.

== Family and personal life ==
In September 2012, Tooley married Tessa Menefee Benson in Santa Barbara, California.

== Filmography ==
=== Producer ===
Year	Title	Role	Notes
1998	Soundman	co-producer	
1998	Only in New York	Producer	
1999	The Last Marshall	producer	
2001	In the Shadows	producer	
2003	Poolhall Junkies	producer	
2003	A Man Apart	producer	
2003	Rip It Off	producer	
2005	Shadowboxer	executive producer	
2006	.45	producer	
2008	Felon	producer	
2009	A Perfect Getaway	producer	
2009	Nine	executive producer	
2009	Brothers	executive producer	
2010	The Spy Next Door	executive producer	
2010	Dear John	executive producer	
2010	MacGruber	executive producer	
2010	My Soul to Take	executive producer	
2010	Skyline	executive producer	
2010	The Fighter	executive producer	
2011	Season of the Witch	executive producer	
2011	Take Me Home Tonight	executive producer	
2011	Limitless	executive producer	
2011	Shark Night 3D	executive producer	
2011	Immortals	executive producer	
2012	Act of Valor	executive producer	
2012	Haywire	executive producer	
2012	Mirror Mirror	executive producer	
2012	The Courier	producer	
2012	House at the End of the Street	executive producer	
2013	Movie 43	executive producer	
2013	Safe Haven	executive producer	
2013	21 & Over	executive producer	
2013	We're the Millers	producer	
2013	Paranoia	executive producer	
2013	The Family	executive producer	
2013	Out of the Furnace	executive producer	
2014	Desert Dancer	executive producer	
2014	The Woman in Black 2: Angel of Death	executive producer	
2015	Jane Got a Gun	executive producer	
2016	The First Monday in May	executive producer	
2016	The Disappointments Room	executive producer	
2017	6 Below: Miracle on the Mountain	producer	
2017	3 Days to Kill	executive producer	
2017	Oculus	executive producer	
2017	Brick Mansions	executive producer	
2017	Earth to Echo	executive producer	
2017	The November Man	executive producer	
2017	Hector and the Search for Happiness	executive producer	
2017	The Best of Me	executive producer	
2017	Beyond the Lights	executive producer	
2017	Masterminds	executive producer	
2017	Shot Caller	executive producer	
2017	The Space Between Us	executive producer	
2018	Den of Thieves	producer	
2018	Hunter Killer	producer	
2018	Hell Fest	producer	
2019	Mary	producer	
2020	Concrete Cowboy	producer	
2021	The United States vs. Billie Holiday	producer	
2024	Arthur the King	producer	
2024	The Deliverance	producer	
2025	Den of Thieves 2: Pantera	producer	
