= Terry Stacey =

British cinematographer

- Born: Terrence C. Stacey; 24 July 1962 (age 63); England, United Kingdom
- Occupation: Cinematographer
- Years active: 1990–present

Terry Stacey (born 24 July 1962) is a British cinematographer.

== Education ==
Stacey graduated from the University of Manchester, England.

== Career ==
Stacey moved to New York in the early 1980s and worked as a still photographer and musician working at The Collective for the Living Cinema. He made and edited Super 8mm shorts, and experimenting in the music video arena.

He began by making documentaries while travelling through South America with his 16 mm bolex. He continued making documentaries in England, India, and Iceland. Stacey has written and directed many of his own short films.

== Filmography ==
=== Film ===
Year	Title	Director
1997	Love God	Frank Grow
1999	Trick	Jim Fall
1999	Jump	Justin McCarthy
1999	The Dream Catcher	Ed Radtke
1999	Spring Forward	Tom Gilroy
2000	Happy Accidents	Brad Anderson
2001	Wendigo	Larry Fessenden
2001	Things Behind the Sun	Allison Anders
2001	World Traveler	Bart Freundlich
2002	Just a Kiss	Fisher Stevens
2003	American Splendor	Shari Springer Berman; Robert Pulcini
2004	The Door in the Floor	Tod Williams
2005	Winter Passing	Adam Rapp
2005	In Her Shoes	Curtis Hanson
2006	Friends with Money	Nicole Holofcener
2007	The Nanny Diaries	Shari Springer Berman; Robert Pulcini
2007	P.S. I Love You	Richard LaGravenese
2009	Adventureland	Greg Mottola
2009	Tell Tale	Michael Cuesta
2010	Dear John	Lasse Hallström
2010	The Extra Man	Shari Springer Berman; Robert Pulcini
2010	Just Wright	Sanaa Hamri
2011	Take Me Home Tonight	Michael Dowse
2011	Salmon Fishing in the Yemen	Lasse Hallström
2011	50/50	Jonathan Levine
2013	Safe Haven	Lasse Hallström
2013	21 & Over	Jon Lucas; Scott Moore
2013	Trust Me	Clark Gregg
2014	This Is Where I Leave You	Shawn Levy
2014	Alexander and the Terrible, Horrible, No Good, Very Bad Day	Miguel Arteta
2016	The Confirmation	Bob Nelson
2016	Elvis & Nixon	Liza Johnson
2016	Special Correspondents	Ricky Gervais
2017	A Dog's Purpose	Lasse Hallström
2018	Den of Thieves	Christian Gudegast
2018	The Angel	Ariel Vromen
2019	The Poison Rose	Francesco Cinquemani; George Gallo
2021	Yes Day	Miguel Arteta
2021	Hitman's Wife's Bodyguard	Patrick Hughes
2025	Den of Thieves 2: Pantera	Christian Gudegast
2026	Scary Movie	Michael Tiddes
2027	Hal	Mark Williams

=== Television ===
Year	Title	Notes
2002	The Laramie Project	TV movie
2016	Chance	6 episodes
2015	Flesh and Bone	7 episodes
2014	Resurrection	Episode: "The Returned"
2006	Dexter	Episode: "Dexter"
2002	Sex and the City	4 episodes
2000	Wonderland	Unknown episodes

== Awards ==
- In 1999 he won special mention for The Dream Catcher at the Thessaloniki Film Festival.
- In 1995 Bad Liver and Broken Heart starring Sam Rockwell was screened at the Berlin International Film Festival.
