= Den of Thieves (film) =

2018 film by Christian Gudegast

- Theatrical release poster
- Directed by: Christian Gudegast
- Screenplay by: Christian Gudegast
- Story by: Christian Gudegast; Paul Scheuring
- Produced by: Gerard Butler; Alan Siegel; Mark Canton; Tucker Tooley
- Starring: Gerard Butler; Pablo Schreiber; O'Shea Jackson Jr.; Curtis Jackson
- Cinematography: Terry Stacey
- Edited by: Joel Cox; David S. Cox; Nathan Godley
- Music by: Cliff Martinez
- Production companies: Diamond Film Productions; Tucker Tooley Entertainment; G-BASE
- Distributed by: STXfilms
- Release date: January 19, 2018
- Running time: 140 minutes
- Country: United States
- Language: English
- Budget: $30 million
- Box office: $80.5 million

Den of Thieves (released in some countries as Criminal Squad) is a 2018 American action crime film written and directed by Christian Gudegast. It stars Gerard Butler, Pablo Schreiber, Curtis Jackson, O'Shea Jackson Jr., Evan Jones, Dawn Olivieri, Mo McRae, and Max Holloway. In the film, a Los Angeles County Sheriff’s Department deputy gang look to stop a crew of thieves consisting of ex-MARSOC Marines that are planning to rob the Federal Reserve in Los Angeles.

Den of Thieves was distributed by STXfilms and released in the United States on January 19, 2018. The film received mixed reviews and grossed $80 million worldwide. A sequel, Den of Thieves 2: Pantera, was released on January 10, 2025 by Lionsgate Films.

== Plot ==
In Los Angeles, a team of ex-MARSOC Marines led by Ray Merrimen hijack an armored truck. The ensuing shootout with police leaves several dead, including one of Merrimen's crew, as the hijackers escape with an empty truck. Los Angeles County Sheriff's Department Detective Nick "Big Nick" O'Brien and his team, the Major Crimes Unit, investigate the robbery, making the recently paroled Merrimen his prime suspect. Nick's team kidnaps Donnie Wilson, a bartender who confesses to acting as the thieves' unarmed getaway driver. He describes a large sum of cash stolen from a stadium by the crew but denies knowing their plans and is released.

Merrimen and his crew prepare to rob the heavily guarded Federal Reserve. With approximately $30 million in old bills removed from circulation daily, they plan to steal the untraceable money before it is shredded. Nick's team tails Donnie, who is hired as a Chinese food delivery driver, allowing him to deliver inside the Federal Reserve. When Nick recognizes Donnie at a restaurant, Merrimen's crew suspects Donnie is an informant. Interrogated at gunpoint, he admits that Nick questioned him; to his surprise, Merrimen orders him to tell Nick when the heist is taking place. Donnie informs Nick but denies knowing the location. Merrimen's girlfriend seduces Nick and, on Merrimen's instructions, reveals the crew will be robbing a bank in Pico Rivera.

On the day of the heist, as Nick's team waits nearby running surveillance, Merrimen's crew takes the Pico Rivera Savings & Loan bank hostage, demanding a ransom and a helicopter. When the FBI attempts to negotiate, the crew appears to execute a female hostage. The thieves access the vault and detonate explosives inside, leading Nick to realize this is not their usual M.O.. He impatiently storms the bank himself to find the hostages alive, bound, and hooded. In contrast, the thieves have blown their way into the sewers and escaped.

Merrimen and his right-hand man Enson infiltrate the Federal Reserve, using the stolen armored truck and stadium money to pose as security guards dropping off cash. Donnie, hidden inside a cart of cash, is wheeled inside a counting room as the thieves disrupt the room's power, making it seem like a common brownout. The employees are briefly sent away, and Donnie triggers an electromagnetic pulse to disable the room's cameras as he sends the bills earmarked for shredding safely down the trash chute. Crawling through an air duct to the restroom, he leaves the building in his delivery uniform as Merrimen and Enson depart.

A garbage truck picks up the trash containing the money, which the thieves intercept. Nick's team captures Donnie and beats him into revealing Merrimen's escape route. Stuck in traffic, Merrimen's crew spots Nick's team approaching and exchange fire; Deputy "Borracho" and thief Bosco are killed. Fleeing on foot with Nick in close pursuit, Enson is killed, and Merrimen is fatally wounded by Nick, who stays by his side until he dies. Instead of the money, only bags of shredded paper are found in Merrimen's vehicle, and the FBI informs Nick that all currency is accounted for at the Federal Reserve while Donnie has escaped.

Nick revisits Donnie's bar only to learn he has quit. Noticing the bar is frequented by Federal Reserve employees and spotting a picture of Donnie and his friends, Nick realizes Donnie is the heist's true mastermind: gathering information from bar patrons, he was able to plan the entire robbery. He recruited his friends to intercept the money and double-cross Merrimen's crew. Having shipped the money offshore to Panama and escaped to London with his accomplices, Donnie is now working at another bar across from a diamond exchange – his next target.

== Cast ==
- Gerard Butler as Detective Nick "Big Nick" O'Brien, a gritty Los Angeles County Sheriff's Department officer and a heavy drinker who is hellbent on bringing down Merrimen's crew. He's married and has two young daughters. Butler was required to gain 25 to 30 pounds in a short period of time for his role.
- Pablo Schreiber as Ray Merrimen, a MARSOC Marine veteran, the crew's leader and lead planner, one of the crew who set out to rob the Federal Reserve Bank of Downtown Los Angeles.
- O'Shea Jackson Jr. as Donnie Wilson, former marine, a bartender and one of the robbers who set out to rob the Federal Reserve Bank of downtown Los Angeles. He is the skilled driver of the group.
- Curtis "50 Cent" Jackson as Enson Levoux, a MARSOC Marine veteran, one of the robbers who set out to rob the Federal Reserve Bank of downtown Los Angeles. He has a wife and teenage daughter.
- Meadow Williams as Holly
- Maurice Compte as Detective Benny "Borracho" Magalon, Los Angeles County Sheriff's Department Major Crimes Unit
- Brian Van Holt as Detective Murph Connors, Los Angeles County Sheriff's Department Major Crimes Unit
- Evan Jones as Bo "Bosco" Ostroman, a MARSOC Marine veteran, former Los Angeles Department of Water and Power technician, and one of the robbers who works directly with Merrimen and Enson
- Mo McRae as Detective Gus Henderson, Los Angeles County Sheriff's Department Major Crimes Unit
- Kaiwi Lyman-Mersereau as Detective Tony "Tony Z" Zapata, Los Angeles County Sheriff's Department Major Crimes Unit
- Dawn Olivieri as Debbie O'Brien, Nick O'Brien's wife who leaves him after discovering he had cheated on her
- Eric Braeden as "Ziggy" Zerhusen
- Lewis Tan as Federal Reserve Police Lobby Guard #1
- Cooper Andrews as Mack, one of the robber's crew members and a Western Telecal phone employee who uses his access to provide intelligence support by tapping into the LAPD data feeds. He is seen in London celebrating the heist with the other inside men Donnie was secretly working with.
- Jermaine Rivers as Officer Jackson, a Federal Reserve Police guard who stops Ray Merrimen and Levoux as they enter and exit the Federal Reserve facility.
- Max Holloway as Bas, one of the robbers and Donnie's friend.
- Oleg Taktarov as Alexi, one of the garbage truck drivers
- Jay Dobyns as Rolph Wolfgang, a United States Federal Reserve employee who frequents Donnie Wilson's bar.
- Alix Lapri as Maloa
- Matthew Cornwell as Joseph, a bank manager
- Nick Loeb as Rudd
- Michael Bisping as Connor

== Production ==
The film was in development for roughly 14 years, where director Christian Gudegast and a writing partner had a blind deal with New Line Cinema in 2003. Peter Berg had been attached to direct at one point and they even considered adapting it as a television series. The project was also later supposed to be distributed by Relativity Media at one point as well. Jay Dobyns, who played the character of Wolfgang, was a former Special Agent and undercover operative with the BATFE and served as a consultant for this film.

=== Filming locations ===
Production began in January 2017. Director of photography, Terry Stacey, shot the movie using the Arri Alexa XT Plus digital motion picture camera. Although set in Los Angeles, California, Den of Thieves was primarily filmed in and around Atlanta, Georgia. Aerial shots of Los Angeles included the Vincent Thomas Bridge, the Federal Correctional Institution, Terminal Island and the skyline of Downtown Los Angeles.

== Reception ==
=== Box office ===
Den of Thieves grossed $44.9 million in the United States and Canada, and $35.7 million in other territories, for a worldwide total of $80.5 million, against a production budget of $30 million.

In the United States and Canada, Den of Thieves was released alongside 12 Strong and Forever My Girl as well as the wide expansions of Phantom Thread, I, Tonya and Call Me by Your Name, on January 19, 2018. Den of Thieves was projected to gross $7–10 million from 2,432 theaters in its opening weekend. It ended up performing above projections, debuting to $15.3 million and finishing third at the box office behind holdover Jumanji: Welcome to the Jungle and 12 Strong. It dropped 43% to $8.6 million in its second week and another 47% to $4.6 million in its third.

=== Critical response ===
On the review aggregator website Rotten Tomatoes, 42% of 136 critics' reviews are positive, with an average rating of 5.1/10. The website's consensus reads: "Den of Thieves pays energetic homage to classic heist thrillers of the past; unfortunately, it never comes close to living up to its obvious inspirations." Metacritic, which uses a weighted average, assigned the film a score of 49 out of 100, based on 24 critics, indicating "mixed or average" reviews. Audiences polled by CinemaScore gave the film an average grade of "B+" on an A+ to F scale.

== Sequel ==
In February 2018, it was announced a sequel was in development with Gudegast signed on to return to write and direct. Additionally, Butler and Jackson Jr. were in talks to reprise their roles. Originally acquired by Briarcliff Entertainment for the U.S. in May 2023 and expected to be released in late 2024, Lionsgate acquired distribution rights the following year as part of their purchase of Entertainment One from Hasbro, with the film released on January 10, 2025.
