= Vampires of the Velvet Lounge =

- Theatrical release poster
- Directed by: Adam Sherman
- Written by: Adam Sherman
- Produced by: Adam Sherman; Marcus Englefield; George Lee
- Starring: Mena Suvari; Dichen Lachman; Stephen Dorff; Rosa Salazar; Lochlyn Munro; India Eisley; Sarah Dumont; Tyrese Gibson
- Cinematography: David Newbert
- Edited by: Miran Miosic
- Music by: Sparks and Shadows
- Production companies: Adam Sherman Film; Storyoscopic Films
- Distributed by: Strand Releasing
- Release date: March 20, 2026
- Running time: 105 minutes
- Country: United States
- Language: English

Vampires of the Velvet Lounge (or simply Vampires) is a 2026 American comedy horror film written, produced, and directed by Adam Sherman. It stars Mena Suvari, Dichen Lachman, Stephen Dorff, Rosa Salazar, Lochlyn Munro, India Eisley, Sarah Dumont, and Tyrese Gibson.

The film was released in the United States on March 20, 2026.

== Premise ==
Vampires hunt their victims by using dating apps.

== Cast ==
- Mena Suvari as Elizabeth
- Dichen Lachman as Cora
- Stephen Dorff as Randall / Ramsey
- Rosa Salazar as Alexis
- Lochlyn Munro as Malcolm
- India Eisley as Joan
- Sarah Dumont as Helena
- Tyrese Gibson as Luke
- Mark Boone Junior as Chuck
- Tom Berenger as Albert
- Timothy V. Murphy as Eric
- Sherman Augustus as Cop Marcus

== Production ==
Principal photography began in December 2023, in Georgia, on a comedy horror film written, co-produced, and directed by Adam Sherman. Mena Suvari, Dichen Lachman, Stephen Dorff, Rosa Salazar, Lochlyn Munro, India Eisley, Sarah Dumont, Tyrese Gibson, Mark Boone Junior, Tom Berenger, Timothy V. Murphy, and Sherman Augustus joined the cast.

== Release ==
Vampires of the Velvet Lounge was released in the United States in limited theaters on March 20, 2026.

== Reception ==
On the review aggregator website Rotten Tomatoes, 27% of 15 critics' reviews are positive.

Simon Abrams of RogerEbert.com gave the film half a star out of four and wrote, "Joyless and dim, the grubby supernatural thriller Vampires of the Velvet Lounge often seems more like a filmed rehearsal for a movie than a fully completed feature."
