= The Dream Catcher (film) =

- DVD cover
- Directed by: Edward A. Radtke
- Written by: M.S. Nieson; Edward A. Radtke
- Produced by: Julia Reichert; Steven Bognar; Peter Wentworth
- Starring: Maurice Compte; Paddy Connor; Jeanne Heaton
- Cinematography: Terry Stacey
- Edited by: Jim Klein
- Music by: Georgiana Gomez
- Distributed by: Redeemable Features
- Release dates: August 8, 1999 (Locarno); September 15, 2000 (United States)
- Running time: 99 minutes
- Country: United States
- Language: English

The Dream Catcher is a 1999 American independent drama film, directed by Edward Radtke. It is a road movie, telling the story of two boys on the road.

== Reception ==
On the review aggregator website Metacritic, which uses a weighted average, assigned the film a score of 61 out of 100 based on 5 critics, indicating "generally favorable reviews". In his review for The New York Times, Stephen Holden said the film "sustains a mood of aimless adolescent angst, and its vision of the road is uncompromisingly bleak."

== Film festivals ==
In 1999, Terry Stacey won special mention for cinematography and Paddy Connor won special mention for acting at the Thessaloniki Film Festival.
