= Sarah Dumont =

American actress and model

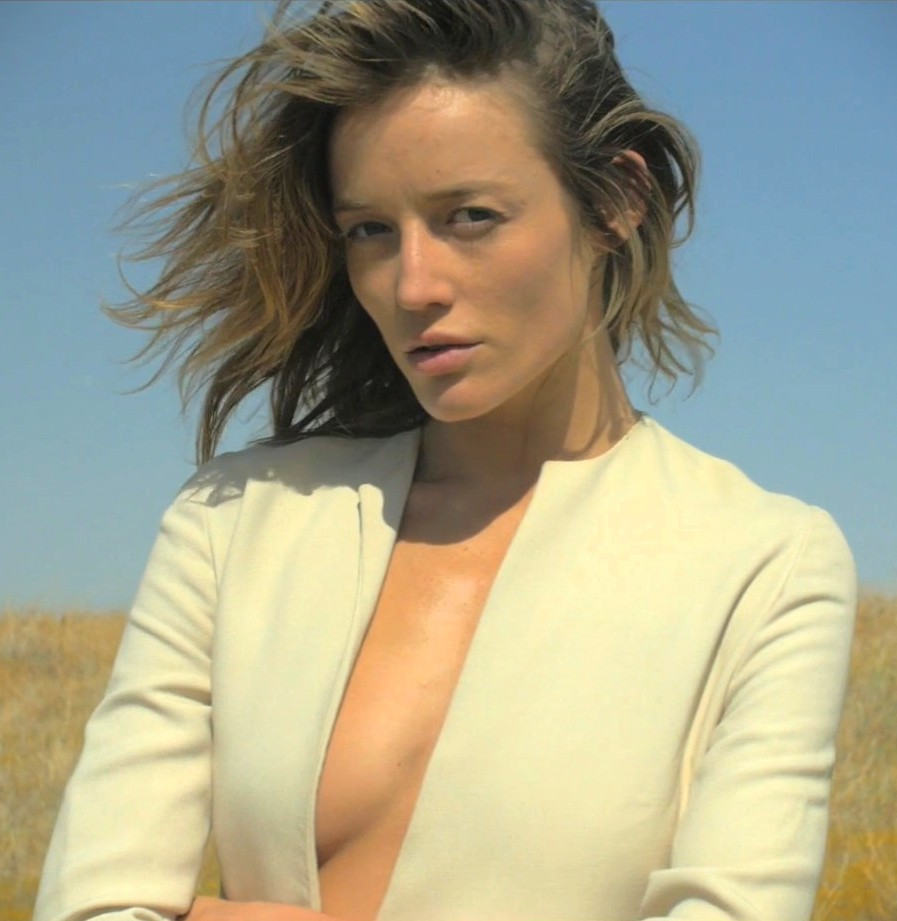
- Dumont in 2018
- Born: April 10, 1990 (age 35); San Diego, California
- Occupations: Actress; model
- Years active: 2009–present

Sarah Dumont (born April 10, 1990) is an American actress and model, best known for playing the lead female role in the film Scouts Guide to the Zombie Apocalypse. She also appeared in the film Don Jon and series The Royals.

== Early life and career ==
Dumont was born in San Diego, California, and after dropping out of high school she started her career as a fashion model. In 2009, she appeared in the series Melrose Place.

In 2013, Dumont played the role of Sequins in the romantic comedy film Don Jon opposite Joseph Gordon-Levitt. She also appeared in the series Agents of S.H.I.E.L.D..

In 2014, Dumont played the lead role in the film Acid Girls, and then appeared in Dads, The Rebels, Bad Ass 2: Bad Asses, Tbilisi, I Love You, Mixology, Oh, You Pretty Things!, Friends with Better Lives, Playing It Cool, and The League.

In 2015, Dumont played the lead role of Denise Russo in the horror comedy film Scouts Guide to the Zombie Apocalypse along with Tye Sheridan, Logan Miller, Joey Morgan, and David Koechner. The film was directed by Christopher B. Landon, which released on October 30, 2015, by Paramount Pictures. She also appeared in the series The Royals.

== Filmography ==
=== Film ===
Year	Title	Role	Notes
2013	Don Jon	Sequins	
2014	Acid Girls	Pike	
2014	Bad Ass 2: Bad Asses	Jessica	Video
2014	Tbilisi, I Love You	Freedom	
2014	Playing It Cool	Cute Girl	
2015	Scouts Guide to the Zombie Apocalypse	Denise Russo	
2016	Rise	Pleasure Model	Short
2017	6 Below: Miracle on the Mountain	Sarah	
2017	Serpent	Gweneth Kealey	
2020	BAB	Bab	
2021	Drive All Night	Morgan	
2022	The Accursed	Beth	
2023	The Resurrection of Charles Manson	Grace Combs	
2023	Zero Hour	Katrina	
2026	Vampires of the Velvet Lounge	Helena	

=== Television ===
Year	Title	Role	Notes
2009	Melrose Place	Celeste	1 episode
2012	CSI: Crime Scene Investigation	Vicky Sheldon	1 episode
2013	Agents of S.H.I.E.L.D.	Beautiful Woman	1 episode
2014	Dads	Hot Girl / Jane	2 episodes
2014	The Rebels	Beautiful Girl	1 episode
2014	Mixology	Tube Top Girl	1 episode
2014	Oh, You Pretty Things!	Tennessee Mills	9 episodes
2014	Friends with Better Lives	Emma	1 episode
2014	The League	Emma	1 episode
2015	The Royals	Mandy / Samantha	7 episodes
2016	Superstore	Nikki	1 episode
2018	The Oath	Kate Miller	6 episodes
2018	Hawaii Five-0	Julia Berg	1 episode
2021	Scene Snob Interviews	Guest	1 episode
2021	9-1-1	Bethany	1 episode
2023	Miracle Workers	Ugulus Assistant	1 episode
