= A Man Apart =

- Theatrical release poster
- Directed by: F. Gary Gray
- Written by: Christian Gudegast; Paul Scheuring
- Produced by: Tucker Tooley; Vincent Newman; Joey Nittolo; Vin Diesel
- Starring: Vin Diesel; Larenz Tate; Timothy Olyphant; Geno Silva; Steve Eastin
- Cinematography: Jack N. Green
- Edited by: Bob Brown; William Hoy
- Music by: Anne Dudley
- Distributed by: New Line Cinema
- Release date: April 4, 2003
- Running time: 109 minutes
- Countries: United States; Germany
- Language: English
- Budget: $36 million
- Box office: $44.3 million

A Man Apart is a 2003 American vigilante action thriller film directed by F. Gary Gray and co-produced by and starring Vin Diesel as Sean Vetter, an undercover DEA agent who is on a vendetta to take down a mysterious drug lord named Diablo after his wife is murdered. The film also stars Larenz Tate with Timothy Olyphant, Geno Silva, and Steve Eastin. Released by New Line Cinema in the United States on April 4, 2003, it received generally negative reviews from critics and performed poorly financially, grossing $44.3 million against a $36 million budget.

== Plot ==
In a prologue, biker drug distributor "Pomona Joe" receives a shipment in San Pedro and contacts South Central-area dealer Monroe "Overdose" Johnson to arrange a transaction.

Sean Vetter and Demetrius Hicks, lifelong friends who grew up together in Los Angeles, are former gang members who have become DEA agents. Under their supervisor Ty Frost, they have spent the past seven years pursuing Memo Lucero, a Colombian national who controls an extensive drug cartel spanning northern Mexico and southern California.

In Tijuana, DEA and Mexican PJF agents prepare to raid a nightclub where Lucero is hosting a gathering. Frost reminds Vetter and Hicks that the PJF has prohibited DEA agents from carrying firearms into the raid and confiscates their guns; however, PJF agent Gustavo Leon disagrees with the policy and supplies them with pistols. In the commotion of the raid, Lucero initially escapes unnoticed through a hidden tunnel that leads to the street, though Vetter identifies the entrance to the tunnel and gives chase. Lucero flees in a vehicle disguised as a taxicab while Vetter pursues on foot and catches up when Lucero becomes stuck in traffic. As he is arrested, Lucero cryptically warns Vetter that he is making a mistake. Vetter surprises his wife Stacy by returning home early from Mexico.

While the DEA declares total victory over Lucero's cartel at a press conference, Lucero's former operations are taken over by forces working for "El Diablo," an unknown underworld figure. Lucero, now extradited to the United States and incarcerated at United States Penitentiary, Victorville, receives a smuggled satellite phone and is informed of the Diablo development by his associates Ramon Cadena and Mateo Santos, while law enforcement listens over a wiretap. Santos promises to protect Lucero's wife Teresa and young son Memocito. Shortly afterwards, Cadena is assassinated in Mexico City.

The Vetters host a party at their beachside home celebrating Lucero's arrest, attended by Sean's friends and colleagues, including Frost, Hicks and his family, and "Big Sexy," a gang member Sean and Hicks grew up with. In Mexicali, Diablo associates Hondo and "Hollywood Jack" Slayton meet to plan further operations. In San Pedro, assassin Juan receives a call ordering a hit on Vetter. While the Vetters sleep, assassins fire into their bedroom. Sean is shot and returns fire, downing one assassin while the rest escape. The wounded assassin tells Sean that Diablo is responsible for the hit before succumbing to his injuries. Returning inside, Sean finds Stacy critically wounded, and calls 9-1-1 before losing consciousness.

After a long recovery period, Vetter briefly awakes to Frost and the Hicks family at his bedside. Some time later, he awakes again and is told by Hicks that Stacy did not survive her injuries. The two visit Stacy's grave. Vetter visits Lucero in prison, who convincingly denies responsibility for the hit. Vetter and Hicks enlist Big Sexy's help in investigating Diablo's network. Sexy identifies a group of dealers in Ghost Town, a South Central neighborhood. The three visit Ghost Town, where Sexy's dog Capone identifies a car with cocaine in the trunk. While they prepare to tow the car, a resident identifies Overdose as the owner, who lives in a nearby house. Inside Vetter and Hicks find three brutal murders, with "Diablo" carved into the flesh of one of the corpses. Overdose, hiding in the attic, fires on them, but Hicks talks him into surrendering. Overdose explains that his crew was attacked after a business dispute with a new distributor, who he initially refuses to identify. Vetter spins a single round into his revolver and pulls the trigger to intimidate Overdose; after three trigger pulls, he identifies Slayton as his distributor. Frost further notes that Overdose had ten phone calls with a Beverly Hills tanning salon operated by Slayton.

Vetter and Hicks stake out the salon. When Slayton notices Hicks' truck and attempts to leave, Vetter detains him. Vetter loses his temper and assaults Slayton, drawing a crowd, and then asks him about Overdose, who he denies knowing. Vetter attacks Slayton again, forcing Hicks to intervene as they have no justification to arrest him. Vetter notes that Slayton referred to Overdose with a racial slur, meaning he must have been lying. Slayton leaves to visit Hondo in Echo Park, executing him for making the calls from the salon and for botching the hit on Vetter. Slayton then calls Juan, arranging to meet with him in Tijuana.

In Mexico, Santos attempts to move Lucero's family to a secure location, but the Luceros are killed by a car bomb. Vetter again visits Lucero as he mourns his family at the prison chapel, and Lucero offers Vetter funds to help him pose undercover as a drug buyer and infiltrate Diablo's network. Vetter and Hicks, posing as out-of-state drug dealers, visit Pomona Joe's Norwalk strip club and negotiate a sale. The DEA sets up a sting operation at the San Pedro waterfront, where Vetter meets with Pomona Joe and Juan to purchase bulk cocaine. During their conversation, Juan's boasts identify him as Stacy's killer, causing Vetter to viciously attack him, triggering a massive shootout. Amidst the chaos, Hicks discovers that Vetter beat Juan to death, and shoots the corpse with a dead criminal's gun to cover it up. Three DEA agents are killed in the firefight, and Frost puts Vetter on leave pending a psychiatric evaluation.

Vetter visits Lucero again, who encourages him to continue his investigation as a vigilante, and offers the location of Diablo's money stash in Mexico in exchange for a transfer to a safer prison. Vetter stakes out the location, a nightclub operated by Pomona Joe. He enlists Hicks to help him raid the club, who refuses, and Big Sexy's crew, who agree. Hicks tries to talk Vetter out of the raid, but ultimately joins. Holding Joe at gunpoint, Vetter and Hicks force him to arrange a cash drop with Slayton in the desert. Once there they ambush Slayton, and beat and threaten him until he reveals that the plan is to deliver the money to Diablo's men in Mexicali. Vetter and Hicks stash a tracking device in the money and hide aboard Slayton's plane while he completes the delivery. On completing the delivery, Slayton is killed by Diablo's men. Vetter and Hicks follow the tracker to the same nightclub from the night they arrested Lucero.

Vetter and Hicks infiltrate the club through the now-flooded hidden tunnel. Inside Vetter finds Santos, seemingly unmasking him as El Diablo, but Santos amusedly denies this as a henchman sneak attacks Vetter. Hicks observes Diablo's men entering the club on CCTV cameras and ambushes them, providing enough of a distraction for Vetter to overpower and kill his assailant. Vetter pursues Santos through the tunnel. Santos shoots him in the leg and nearly drowns him before Vetter shoots and kills him. While Vetter and Hicks are in Mexico, Lucero's prison transfer begins, but gunmen attack his bus and spring him. It is revealed that the Diablo persona was a ruse by Lucero to consolidate his power.

Vetter, limping and unarmed, confronts Lucero in his small Colombian hometown. Lucero, surrounded by bodyguards, mocks the futility of Vetter's quest for revenge; Vetter counters that he has only come to arrest Lucero, as half of the bodyguards reveal themselves as undercover DEA agents and the Colombian military storms the town to assist in the arrest.

Vetter and Hicks again visit Stacy's grave. Vetter tells her that while he is still grieving, he has found peace.

== Cast ==
- Vin Diesel as DEA Agent Sean Vetter
- Larenz Tate as DEA Agent Demetrius Hicks
- Timothy Olyphant as Jack "Hollywood Jack" Slayton
- Geno Silva as Memo "Diablo" Lucero
- Jacqueline Obradors as Stacy Vetter
- Karrine Steffans as Candice Hicks
- Steve Eastin as Supervisory DEA Agent Ty Frost
- Juan Fernández as Mateo Santos
- Jeff Kober as Joe "Pomona Joe"
- Marco Rodríguez as "Hondo"
- Mike Moroff as Gustavo Leon
- Emilio Rivera as Garza
- Laura Salem-Harding as Nightclub Worker
- George Sharperson as "Big Sexy"
- Malieek Straughter as Monroe "Overdose" Johnson
- Alice Amter as Marta
- Ken Davitian as Ramon Cadena
- Atiana Coons-Parker as Rachel Hicks

== Release ==
=== Box office ===
After a prolonged delay, A Man Apart was finally released April 4, 2003 in 2,459 theaters and grossed $11,019,224 on its opening weekend, ranking #3 at the box office. As of July 10, 2003, the film has a domestic box office gross of $26,736,098 and an international gross of $17,614,828, giving it a worldwide total of $44,350,926.

=== Critical reception ===
The film was panned by critics. On Rotten Tomatoes, it has an approval rating of 10% based on 130 reviews, with an average rating of 4/10. The site's consensus is: "Action and drama elements don't mix well in this clichéd actioner". On Metacritic, the film has an average score of 36 out of 100 based on 32 reviews. Audiences polled by CinemaScore gave the film an average grade of "B+" on an A+ to F scale.

=== Director’s perspective ===
In a 2014 interview with the BBC, F. Gary Gray identified A Man Apart as his biggest professional regret. He stated, “A Man Apart I just regret,” explaining that he “didn’t do [his] homework for that one,” and adding that he wished he had returned to reshoot parts of the film. In a 2015 interview with Deadline, Gray further explained the difficulties surrounding the production, stating that the film “wasn’t well received” and revealing that he did not complete the film himself. He noted that “the last five minutes were directed by somebody else” as he had already moved on to work on The Italian Job, describing the experience as “a really rough” one.

=== Home video ===
A Man Apart was released on DVD on September 2, 2003, as a 'barebones' release, containing no special features except deleted scenes and trailers. It was criticized for its poor video transfer. The film was later released on Blu-ray Disc on August 14, 2012.

== Lawsuit ==
The film's original title, "Diablo" was the subject of a lawsuit by the video game company Blizzard Entertainment in 2001 when the developer/publisher filed against New Line Cinema, claiming trademark infringement on the name Diablo (a title used by Blizzard for a franchise of role-playing video games). A court initially ruled in favor of Blizzard, but the decision was reversed on appeal. Ultimately, New Line changed the film's name.

== Soundtrack ==
1. "The Messenjah (Tweaker Remix)" - P.O.D
2. "Straight Out of Line" - Godsmack
3. "Right Now" - Korn
4. "I'm Tired of Good, I'm Trying Bad" - Bootsy Collins
5. "Touch" - Seal
6. "Descarga Total" - Maraca
7. "Double Drums" - Peter Kruder
8. "6 Underground" - Sneaker Pimps
9. "But I Feel Good" - Groove Armada
10. "King for a Day" - Jamiroquai
11. "Buena" - Morphine
12. "My Own Prison" - Creed
13. "Rover Take Over" - Lords of Acid
14. "Gone!" - The Cure
15. "Broken Home" - Papa Roach
16. "Nothing To Lose" - Buddy Klein
17. “Blurry” - Puddle Of Mudd

== Footnotes ==
1. The film's distribution rights were transferred to Warner Bros. in 2008.
