= Den of Thieves 2: Pantera =

2025 film by Christian Gudegast

- Theatrical release poster
- Directed by: Christian Gudegast
- Written by: Christian Gudegast
- Based on: Characters by: Christian Gudegast; Paul Scheuring
- Produced by: Tucker Tooley; Gerard Butler; Alan Siegel; Mark Canton
- Starring: Gerard Butler; O'Shea Jackson Jr.; Evin Ahmad; Salvatore Esposito; Meadow Williams; Swen Temmel
- Cinematography: Terry Stacey
- Edited by: Roberth Nordh
- Music by: Kevin Matley
- Production companies: Tucker Tooley Entertainment; Sierra Pictures; eOne Features; G-BASE; Diamond Film Productions; G-Unit Films and Television Inc.
- Distributed by: Lionsgate
- Release date: January 10, 2025
- Running time: 144 minutes
- Country: United States
- Languages: English; French; Sicilian; Italian; Serbian; Hebrew
- Budget: $40 million
- Box office: $58.4 million

Den of Thieves 2: Pantera is a 2025 American heist film and the sequel to the 2018 film Den of Thieves. Gerard Butler and O'Shea Jackson Jr. reprise their roles from the first film, while Christian Gudegast returns to write and direct. Inspired by the 2003 Antwerp diamond heist, the plot follows an LASD sheriff who follows a suspected thief to Europe in an attempt to team-up with him for a robbery.

Lionsgate theatrically released Den of Thieves 2 in the United States on January 10, 2025. Like its predecessor, the film received mixed reviews from critics and grossed $58.4 million worldwide against a $40 million budget.

== Plot ==
In Antwerp, Belgium, Donnie Wilson joins the Panther Crew, led by Jovanna, to steal a red diamond and files from an airport hangar. They flee disguised as SWAT. Back in Long Beach, California, Deputy Sheriff Nick O'Brien is recently divorced and seemingly put on leave by the Los Angeles Sheriff's Department. He meets with Merrimen's girlfriend Holly and asks her about Merrimen and Donnie's plans after the federal reserve heist. She discloses that the money from the heist is being stored in a bank in Panama and threatens to release footage of Nick's affair with her unless he is able to get her Merrimen's cut from the heist.

The Panthers plan their next heist: a diamond vault at the World Diamond Center in Nice, France. Donnie, posing as a diamond trader, infiltrates the bank, while Nick confirms Donnie's involvement through the local task force led by Detective Hugo without alerting them. Nick meets Donnie and forces his way into the crew. Jovanna introduces Nick to Chava, the vault manager's wife and their inside link. Meanwhile, the Calabrian mafia, angry over the stolen red diamond, plans retaliation.

The Panthers party at a club, where Nick flirts with Jovanna, causing Marko, her ex-boyfriend, and Vuk to brawl with Nick. After being kicked out of the club, Nick and Donnie are kidnapped by the mafia, demanding the diamond's return to their leader, the infamous Octopus. Donnie calls Nick, who recommits to the heist. Jovanna announces that Marko and Vuk have been ousted from the crew following their fight and declares Nick a fellow Panther.

Disguised as a security contractor, Nick maps out the vault while accompanying Chava to store some diamonds for Donnie in her deposit box. After leaving the vault, Nick encounters Hugo and his children in a church. The crew executes a meticulous invasion, avoiding surveillance and cracking safes, with Jovanna and Dragan running surveillance while Nick, Donnie, and Slavko infiltrate the building. They secure the diamond and cash but face complications during their escape when a metal pole meant to help everyone cross to the next building over breaks before Nick can traverse it. Nick improvises under pressure as Donnie and Slavko escape to the streets, eventually regrouping just as the bank's security personnel become aware of the heist. Upon meeting in a parking garage, the three men transfer their loot to Jovanna's van, before Nick, Donnie and Slavko continue on to the Italian border to escape. The crew are ambushed on the way by Marko and Vuk who have led a rival gang, The Tigers, to kill them and steal the loot. Nick and Slavko get shot in the process, while Nick disposes of Marko and Vuk's henchmen. Donnie crashes their car under fire and just as Marko and Vuk are about to execute them, the Octopus' henchmen save the three Panthers by killing Marko and Vuk. Donnie returns the diamond, and the mafia spares their lives while providing them an alternate vehicle to continue their journey.

The Panthers celebrate in Italy, but the Italian authorities arrest the crew and their leader, Slobodan. Nick is revealed to have ratted the crew out during his previous encounter with Hugo, but feels guilt at snitching on his newfound friends. Later, Donnie, in prison, is confronted by Nick, who admits his dual nature, but shares that their friendship was real before telling him to “sit back left”. During Donnie's transport to another facility, the mafia ambushes the convoy, seemingly kidnapping him while giving him the same instructions Nick did. Donnie enjoys a beer with The Octopus members as it is revealed they want to recruit Donnie to work for them, impressed by his skills. Donnie asks what the next job is.

Meanwhile, Nick receives a text message from Donnie that reads, "And the tiger changes stripes. All the cats out of the cage. C U soon, Fraulein." The message implies that the rest of the Panthers have also been sprung from confinement. Nick smiles as he drives along the coastline.

== Cast ==
- Gerard Butler as Nicholas "Big Nick" O'Brien
- O'Shea Jackson Jr. as Donnie Wilson "Jean-Jacques"
- Evin Ahmad as Jovanna "Cleopatra"
- Meadow Williams as Holly
- Salvatore Esposito as Slavko
- Orli Shuka as Dragan
- Cristian Solimeno as Florentin
- Nazmiye Oral as Chava
- Dino Kelly as Marko
- Fortunato Cerlino as Zamba
- Yasen Zates Atour as Hugo
- Michael Bisping as Connor
- Giuseppe Schillaci as Moussa
- Rico Verhoeven as Vigo
- Velibor Topić as Vuk
- Antonio Bustorff as Tamy
- Adriano Chiaramida as The Octopus
- Swen Temmel as Milan Lovren
- Ciryl Gane as Pape
- Yuri D. Brown as Corrections Officer

== Production ==
After the release of Den of Thieves in 2018, development of a sequel was in the works with plans for Christian Gudegast to return as director and writer, as well as for Gerard Butler and O'Shea Jackson Jr. to return and reprise their roles. The film was originally slated to begin filming in 2022. Principal photography took place from April to July 2023 in the United Kingdom and the Canary Islands. The production transformed several aspects of the main streets in Santa Cruz de Tenerife for the shoot, such as building up a police station and jewelry store and setting up a local bar to appear French.

Kevin Matley composed the film score, replacing Cliff Martinez from the previous film. Lionsgate Records released the soundtrack, coinciding with the film's release date.

== Release ==
Originally set to be distributed by STX Entertainment, as with the first film, Briarcliff Entertainment purchased the film for distribution in the United States in May 2023 with Sierra/Affinity handling international sales of the film and a wide theatrical release being planned in the United States for late 2024. However, in May 2024, Lionsgate was announced to have distribution rights as part of their acquisition of financiers Entertainment One (later rebranded to Lionsgate Canada) from Hasbro in December 2023, with the film set to be released in the United States on January 10, 2025.

=== Home media ===
The movie was made available to stream on the streaming service Netflix.

== Reception ==
=== Box office ===
Den of Thieves 2: Pantera grossed $36 million in the United States and Canada, and $22.4 million in other territories, for a worldwide total of $58.4 million.

In the United States and Canada, Pantera was released alongside Better Man and was projected to gross $11–13 million from 3,008 theaters in its opening weekend. The film made $6 million on its first day, including an estimated $1.35 million from Thursday night previews. It slightly overperformed and debuted to $15 million, topping the box office and nearly matching the first film's $15.2 million opening, which Deadline Hollywood attributed to the choice of release date. The film made $6.6 million (a drop of 56.1%) in its second weekend and $3 million in its third. Its theatrical run ended after 53 days.

=== Critical response ===
On the review aggregator website Rotten Tomatoes, 62% of 89 critics' reviews are positive, with an average rating of 5.9/10. The website's consensus reads: "Pantera trades the original Den of Thieves' self-seriousness for a more winking lightheartedness that doesn't entirely smooth over its familiarity but ought to satisfy those hankering for absolute Dad Cinema." Metacritic, which uses a weighted average, assigned the film a score of 60 out of 100, based on 23 critics, indicating "mixed or average" reviews. Audiences polled by CinemaScore gave the film an average grade of "B+" on an A+ to F scale, same as the first film, while those surveyed by PostTrak gave it a 72% overall positive score.

In a positive review for Variety, Owen Gleiberman preferred Den of Thieves 2 to its predecessor, calling the sequel "smoother and more all of a piece". He also praised Butler's charisma in the lead role, and he opined that the films "could turn out to be Butler’s most rock-solid franchise". Brian Tallerico of RogerEbert.com awarded the movie 3 out of 4 stars. Tallerico liked the action sequences, describing them as "realistically metallic instead of that CGI cartoon nature that we so often see in films like this one". Robert Daniels of The New York Times also praised the set pieces, while describing the plot as "convoluted". In a negative review for Rolling Stone, David Fear criticized the film as containing "some clumsy buddy-comedy elements and a lot of action-movie hot air".

== Future ==
In January 2025, Butler confirmed plans to make a third film, saying "I will not wait anymore" and taking partial blame for the seven-year gap between films. Gudegast said a potential third film depended on the success of the second installment; and the studio had received a pitch for the potential project.

Later that month, Gudegast stated that the script for the third installment had been completed, also announcing that there are plans for at least two additional sequels to follow thereafter. Each film would take place in different parts of the world, beginning with Africa in the third movie, followed by the other planned installments in Brazil and South East Asia, with each being based on real-life heists. The studio plans to begin production on the third installment before 2026. The third film was officially greenlit by Lionsgate that same month. Gerard Butler will reprise his starring role in addition to once again serving as producer, while O'Shea Jackson Jr. is also in negotiations to costar. Christian Gudegast will write/direct the movie, with the project being a joint-venture production between Lionsgate Films, G-BASE Productions, and Tucker Tooley Entertainment.
