= The Man Who Came Back (2008 film) =

2008 film

- DVD cover
- Directed by: Glen Pitre
- Written by: Glen Pitre; Chuck Walker
- Produced by: Michelle Benoit; Stephen Bowen; Sam Cable; Chuck Walker; Christian Gudegast
- Starring: Eric Braeden; Billy Zane; Sean Young; Peter Jason; George Kennedy; Armand Assante
- Cinematography: Stoeps Langensteiner
- Edited by: Matthew Booth; Simon Carmody
- Music by: Phil Marshall
- Distributed by: Anchor Bay Entertainment; Grindstone Entertainment Group
- Release date: February 8, 2008
- Running time: 112 minutes
- Country: United States
- Language: English

The Man Who Came Back is a 2008 American Western film directed by Glen Pitre. It stars Eric Braeden, Billy Zane, George Kennedy, and Armand Assante. Set in southern Louisiana, it is loosely based on the 1887 sugar strike in four parishes and violence that erupted in the Thibodaux massacre.

== Plot ==
The Man Who Came Back is loosely based on the Thibodaux massacre. This was the culmination of the largest strike in the sugar cane industry, when 10,000 workers stopped labor, and the first to be conducted by a formal labor organization, the Knights of Labor. With an estimated 50 or more African-American cane workers killed by white paramilitary forces, it was the second bloodiest labor strike in U.S. history.

Following Reconstruction and white Democrats regaining control of the state government, in the late 1880s, freedmen worked hard on sugar cane plantations but were bound by many of the planters' practices. They were sometimes paid only in scrip, redeemable only at the plantation's overpriced store, and the workers struggled to get out of debt and be able to leave a plantation.

In an attempt to better their lives, the workers strike. This leads to massive retaliation by the most powerful men in the town, including the sheriff, the preacher, power-hungry Billy Duke, and his vigilante group of thugs.

White overseer Reese Paxton steps up to demand justice for his workers. Duke's rage turns on Paxton and his family. Despite assistance from a Yankee attorney, Paxton is convicted in a trial presided by Judge Duke, Billy's father.

After being sent to prison, beaten within inches of his life, and enduring emotional torture, Paxton "comes back" to seek revenge.

== Cast ==
- Eric Braeden as Reese Paxton
- Billy Zane as Ezra
- George Kennedy as Judge Duke
- Armand Assante as Amos
- Sean Young as Kate
- James Patrick Stuart as Billy Duke
- Ken Norton as Grandpa
- Peter Jason as The Warden
- Jennifer O'Dell as Prostitute
