= Scouts Guide to the Zombie Apocalypse =

2015 American zombie comedy film

- Theatrical release poster
- Directed by: Christopher Landon
- Screenplay by: Carrie Evans; Emi Mochizuki; Christopher Landon
- Story by: Carrie Evans; Emi Mochizuki; Lona Williams
- Produced by: Todd Garner; Andy Fickman
- Starring: Tye Sheridan; David Koechner
- Cinematography: Brandon Trost
- Edited by: Jim Page
- Music by: Matthew Margeson
- Production company: Broken Road Productions
- Distributed by: Paramount Pictures
- Release date: October 30, 2015
- Running time: 93 minutes
- Country: United States
- Language: English
- Budget: $15–24 million
- Box office: $16.1 million

Scouts Guide to the Zombie Apocalypse is a 2015 American zombie comedy film directed by Christopher Landon, and written by Landon, Carrie Evans, Emi Mochizuki and Lona Williams. The film stars Tye Sheridan, Logan Miller, Joey Morgan, Sarah Dumont and David Koechner. The film was released in the United States on October 30, 2015, by Paramount Pictures. It received generally negative reviews from critics but Sheridan's performance was praised.

== Plot ==
A janitor is cleaning in a laboratory and interrupts a scientist as he asks to clean the floors in his working area. The scientist agrees and retreats to the hallway to a vending machine. The janitor accidentally knocks off a life monitor attached to a man; in his attempt to revive the man, he gives chest compressions but his hands rip through the flesh as the man awakens and attacks the janitor. Moments later, the zombified janitor attacks the scientist in the hallway.

Three high school sophomores, Ben, Carter, and Augie, are trying to recruit new members for their Scout group, led by their Scout Leader Rogers. While Augie has always been happy about being a Scout, Ben and Carter have second thoughts since they're growing out of favor and considering quitting the scouts. En route to a campsite, Ben accidentally hits a deer. They manage to get help from Carter's sister, Kendall (on whom Ben has a crush), and her friends. They return to the accident site, only to find that the dead deer has vanished. Before they leave, the two are invited to the "Secret Seniors Party", and Carter is given the address. Meanwhile, while trying to meet the boys in the woods, Rogers is attacked and killed by the deer and the zombified scientist.

When they get alcohol for the party, they meet Denise, a cocktail waitress who works at a strip club. She and Ben hit it off, and she agrees to buy the alcohol for them. The two then meet up with Augie in the woods so they can set up their campsite. That night, Carter wakes Ben so they can attend the party. Augie catches them, however, and is disappointed by their choice. Ben and Carter drive into town to find that the bouncer for the strip club is no longer there, and they sneak in. They are attacked by the zombified bouncer and stripper before being saved by Denise. Augie goes to Rogers' house to find him, only to be attacked by the now zombified Rogers. Augie manages to incapacitate him and flee the scene.

Ben, Carter, and Denise go to the police station to discover that the town has been evacuated, before a zombie horde chases them into a holding cell, whose door snaps shut, trapping them. Augie arrives and turns on a car radio, luring the zombies outside, and unlocks the cell. The fugitives make their way to the freeway, where they are picked up by US Army Corporal Reeves. They drive to the party to see if anyone is evacuated, only to find that the address that was sent to Carter was fake.

Tensions rise amongst the group, but Reeves was bitten before meeting them and turns into a zombie. Denise kills him, and trying to get a signal on his radio, they overhear information about the Army intending to bomb the town to wipe out the zombies. Carter remembers that Kendall's diary has the party information in it; the four take Reeves' humvee and drive to Carter's house. They find the diary, but more zombies arrive and chase after them. They escape using a trampoline to get to the house of now zombified neighbor Ms. Fielder, take her car and head off down the road, until they find a dirt bike down the road and Denise takes it so she can get the military. Now left by themselves, Ben, Carter, and Augie build themselves weapons at a hardware store and head to the party.

The zombies find the party and attack the partygoers, until the trio turns up and evacuates the survivors. Once they run out of ammo, they lock themselves in the building and the zombies follow them upstairs. They barricade themselves in the gym, and Augie reveals that he's built a bomb that was hidden in Ben's backpack. He manages to light the fuse just as the zombies burst in, and the three escape through a garbage chute just before the bomb explodes, killing the zombies. Denise and the military arrive at the scene, helping the survivors. The scouts reconcile their friendship, and Ben, with Denise's encouragement, starts a relationship with Kendall.

== Cast ==
- Tye Sheridan as Ben Goudy
- Logan Miller as Carter Grant
- Joey Morgan as Augie Foster
- Sarah Dumont as Denise Russo
- David Koechner as Scout Leader Rogers
- Halston Sage as Kendall Grant
- Cloris Leachman as Ms. Fielder
- Niki Koss as Chloe
- Hiram A. Murray as Corporal Reeves
- Lukas Gage as Travis
- Drew Droege as drunk man
- Patrick Schwarzenegger as Jeff
- Blake Anderson as Ron the Janitor
- Elle Evans as Amber
- Dillon Francis as DJ zombie
- Sara Malakul Lane as Beth Daniels
- Cameron Elmore as nerdy kid
- Missy Martinez as Deputy Zombie

== Production ==
Prior to this film, Christopher Landon had worked on three movies in the Paranormal Activity series, and he relished the chance to do something more lighthearted. The script put him in mind of various 1980s movies. He stated, "When I read the first script, I was like, 'Wow, I can actually make a gory R-rated version of The Goonies and Gremlins or even Monster Squad.'" At the same time, Landon noted, he did not want the film to be a complete throwback and wanted to modernize the genre somewhat—a task he compared to the one he had with Disturbia, trying to modernize a Hitchcockian thriller.

Principal photography began on May 8, 2014, in Los Angeles.

== Release ==
Although initially set for a March 13, 2015, release date, it was eventually pushed back to October 30, 2015.

In July 2015, Paramount announced that it had struck a deal with AMC Entertainment and Cineplex Entertainment to make Scouts Guide and Paranormal Activity: The Ghost Dimension available digitally, 17 days after they dropped below 300 theaters, as part of a larger experiment, and asked other theaters to join in. In return, Paramount would share an undisclosed portion of proceeds of the VOD revenues. Per industry sources, Paramount gave participating exhibitors an estimated 2 to 4 percent share of the studio's digital revenue made between the time the film dropped below 300 theaters and 90 days after its opening date. Participants in Paramount's formula included AMC, Canada's Cineplex, National Amusements, and Alamo Drafthouse. But many circuits, including Regal Cinema, Cinemark, and Carmike, rejected Paramount's offer to release by VOD. This meant that both films would only go out in roughly 1,350 North American theaters when opening on October 23 and 30—compared to 2,883 theaters for Paranormal Activity: The Marked Ones and substantially more than the 3,000 theaters for each of the previous three PA installments. The impetus for Paramount's experimentation with this approach, with these two younger-demographic genre movies—which many have deemed box office failures—was the theatrical failure of MGM's Hot Tub Time Machine 2. Rob Moore, vice chairman of Paramount Pictures, said: "There is no question that we are going to do less theatrically, but I believe we will make it up digitally. This is about the long-term health of the business, so there is not this long period of time when a consumer can't watch a movie."

== Reception ==
=== Box office ===
Scouts Guide to the Zombie Apocalypse grossed $3.7 million in North America and $12.4 million in other territories, for a worldwide total of $16.1 million. The production budget was $24 million, and received $3 million in incentives and rebates as part of the California Film and Television Tax Credit Program.

The film opened on October 30, 2015, alongside Burnt and Our Brand Is Crisis. The film was initially projected to gross $2–4 million from 1,509 theaters in its opening weekend but ended up grossing $1.8 million, finishing 12th at the box office.

=== Critical response ===
Critic Peter Sobczynski of RogerEbert.com savaged the film as "disposable junk", calling it "loud, repellent, badly written, indifferently directed and almost completely devoid of any genuine laughs". Katie Rife from The A.V. Club gave the film a C− grade, commenting: "If Scouts Guide to the Zombie Apocalypse is the future, maybe the world should end." Tim Janson from the SciFi Movie Page rated the film 41% out of 100%, saying: "This zombie comedy is short on laughs."

As of November 2021, the film holds a 44% approval rating on Rotten Tomatoes, based on 97 reviews with an average rating of 4.8/10. The site's consensus reads, "Scouts Guide to the Zombie Apocalypse fails to live up to its intriguingly wacky title, instead delivering yet another zombie comedy-thriller with a tired T&A twist." On Metacritic, the film has a weighted average score of 32 out of 100, based on 17 critics, indicating "generally unfavorable reviews". Audiences polled by CinemaScore gave the film an average grade of B− on an A+ to F scale.

=== Home media ===
The film was released on December 8, 2015, onto Digital HD and On Demand, and on January 5, 2016, on DVD and Blu-ray.

=== Accolades ===
Award	Category	Nominee	Result
COLA	Location Team of the Year – Studio Feature Film	Stephenson Crossley (location manager); Will Ruvalcaba (key assistant location manager); Jeanie Farnam (assistant location manager); Christopher Kusiak (assistant location manager); Sofia Ochoa (assistant location manager)	Nominated
