= 6 Below: Miracle on the Mountain =

2017 film by Scott Waugh

- Theatrical release poster
- Directed by: Scott Waugh
- Written by: Madison Turner
- Based on: Crystal Clear by Eric LeMarque; Davin Seay
- Produced by: Scott Waugh; Bradley Pilz; Josh Hartnett; Simon Swart; Tucker Tooley
- Starring: Josh Hartnett; Mira Sorvino; Sarah Dumont; Jason Cottle
- Cinematography: Michael Svitak
- Edited by: Vashi Nedomansky
- Music by: Nathan Furst
- Production companies: Tooley Productions; Rockpile Studios; Sonar Entertainment
- Distributed by: Momentum Pictures
- Release date: October 13, 2017
- Running time: 98 minutes
- Country: United States
- Language: English
- Box office: $641,499

6 Below: Miracle on the Mountain is a 2017 American survival drama film directed by Scott Waugh and written by Madison Turner, based on the non-fiction book Crystal Clear by Eric LeMarque and Davin Seay. It stars Josh Hartnett, Mira Sorvino, Sarah Dumont, and Jason Cottle, and tells the true story of former professional hockey player Eric LeMarque, who finds himself stranded in the High Sierra during a fierce snowstorm and must use his wit and willpower to survive. The film was released in the United States on October 13, 2017.

== Premise ==
In February 2004, when a snowstorm strands former professional hockey player Eric LeMarque atop the Sierra Nevada Mountains, he is forced to rediscover the power of faith within him in order to survive.

== Plot ==
Eric LeMarque, a former professional hockey player whose life has been wrecked by meth addiction, is introduced in voice-over reflecting on how his drive to win once defined him. Hockey gave him purpose, but years of punishment, pressure, and injury left him broken, and he turned to drugs after his career collapsed. His mother has reached the end of her patience and tells him she will not keep rescuing him unless he commits to recovery. Eric is due in court within a week and has been told he must enter a 12-step program, but instead of facing his problems, he impulsively heads for the mountains to snowboard alone.

Before reaching the slopes, Eric meets Sarah, a local woman with a dog, Jackson, who offers him a ride. She casually warns him about survival basics in cold weather, including the danger of eating snow, which lowers body temperature and worsens dehydration. Eric brushes past the warning and sets out by himself, hoping for escape rather than help. On the mountain, deteriorating weather begins to close in, and what started as a day of boarding quickly turns dangerous when he loses his bearings in worsening visibility and deep snow.

As the storm intensifies, Eric realizes he is no longer on a safe route back to the resort. He tries to push through the terrain, but exhaustion, cold, and panic steadily undermine his judgment. He falls repeatedly, injures himself, and becomes stranded far from the lifts and marked trails. His early efforts to treat the situation like a challenge give way to fear as the mountain becomes a fight for simple survival.

Cut off from help, Eric spends days stumbling through forests, ravines, and frozen ridges while trying to orient himself. He rations what little strength he has left, but hunger, thirst, and exposure begin to destroy him physically. He eats snow despite the risk, collapses often, and struggles to keep moving after soaking himself in freezing water. At one point, he appears to be stalked by wolves, which heightens his terror and reinforces how helpless he has become in the wilderness.

Throughout the ordeal, Eric’s isolation is broken by memories and hallucinations that reveal the life he is trying to outrun. He remembers his childhood and his father’s harsh insistence that LeMarques do not quit. He recalls hockey practices, locker-room moments, and the pressure to think only of winning. Other memories bring back the emotional wreckage of his addiction, including shame, failure, and the disappointment he caused the people closest to him. These visions blur with the present as hypothermia worsens, making it harder for him to tell what is real.

The film also follows the growing concern back home. Eric’s absence becomes more alarming when he misses his court date and cannot be reached. His mother gradually pieces together where he has gone and realizes he is missing on the mountain. Sarah becomes involved as the search effort builds, and the ski patrol and rescue teams begin trying to determine where Eric could have disappeared. Bad weather, poor visibility, and the amount of time that has passed make the search increasingly difficult, and hope begins to fade.

As Eric weakens further, the mountain ordeal becomes a spiritual and emotional reckoning as much as a physical one. He talks to himself, curses himself, pleads for strength, and tries to use remembered advice and stubbornness to stay alive. Even when he can barely stand, he keeps forcing himself forward, driven by fragments of training, fear, and a buried desire not to die. The struggle gradually shifts from simple survival to a confrontation with the person he has become.

Eventually, rescuers narrow the search area and locate signs that lead them toward Eric’s position near a ridge. By this point he is near death, physically ruined by days in the wilderness, but he is still alive. A helicopter rescue finally lifts him off the mountain, ending the immediate crisis. Eric is reunited with his mother, and the experience is framed as the point at which he is forced to stop running from addiction, failure, and himself. The closing moments present his survival as a form of rebirth: he has fallen as far as he can, and only then begins to understand how to live.

== Cast ==
- Josh Hartnett as Eric LeMarque
- Mira Sorvino as Susan LeMarque
- Sarah Dumont as Sarah
- Jason Cottle as David LeMarque

== Production ==
In February 2016, it was announced the first film former Relativity Studios president Tucker Tooley would finance 6 Below, based on the memoir by Eric LeMarque. Filming began in Utah in March 2016.

== Release ==
In February 2017, Momentum Pictures acquired the distribution rights to the film, later setting it for an October 13, 2017 release.

=== Critical response ===
On review aggregator Rotten Tomatoes the film holds an approval rating of 22% based on 18 reviews, with an average rating of 4.37/10. On Metacritic, the film has a weighted average score of 40 out of 100, based on 5 critics, indicating "mixed or average" reviews.
