= Eric Braeden =

German-American actor (born 1941)

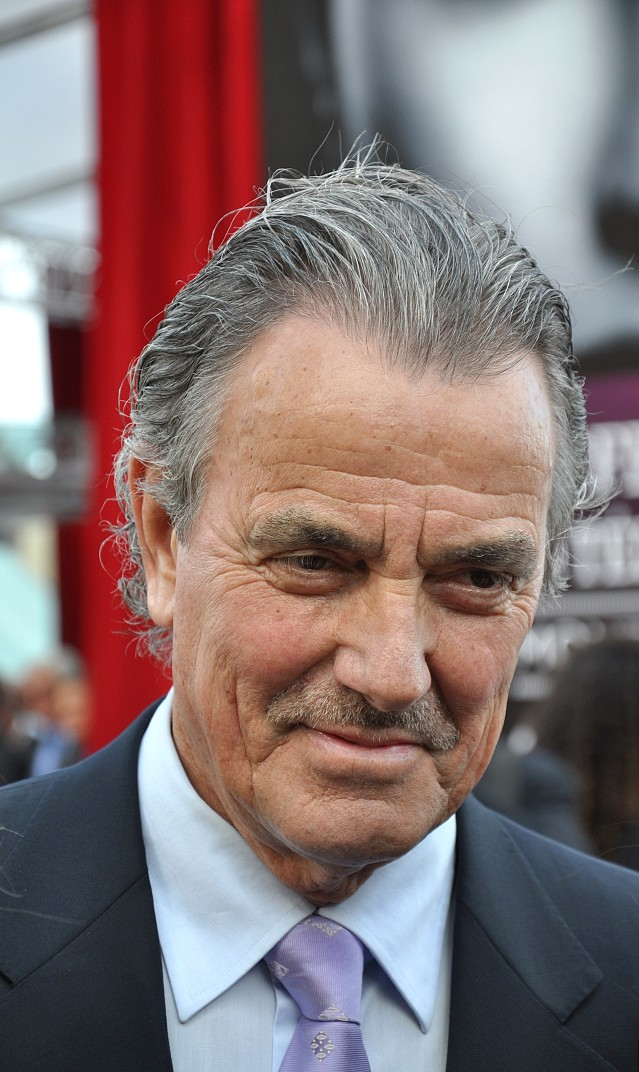
- Braeden in 2013
- Born: Hans-Jörg Gudegast; April 3, 1941 (age 85); Bredenbek, Free State of Prussia, Germany (present-day Schleswig-Holstein, Germany)
- Education: University of Montana
- Occupation: Actor
- Years active: 1960–present
- Spouse: Dale Russell (m. 1966)
- Children: Christian Gudegast
- Website: ericbraeden.com

Eric Braeden (born Hans-Jörg Gudegast; April 3, 1941) is a German-American film and television actor. He is best known for his role as Victor Newman on the CBS soap opera The Young and the Restless, (1980—present). He received ten Daytime Emmy Award nominations for Outstanding Lead Actor in a Drama Series, winning in 1998. He is also known for roles such as Hans Dietrich in the 1960s TV series The Rat Patrol, Dr. Charles Forbin in the 1970 film Colossus: The Forbin Project, Dr. Otto Hasslein in the 1971 film Escape from the Planet of the Apes, and John Jacob Astor IV in the 1997 film Titanic.

== Early life ==
Braeden was born Hans-Jörg Gudegast on April 3, 1941 in Bredenbek, Germany (near Kiel), a small village in northern Germany where his father was once mayor. When Braeden first came to America, he arrived in New York City. Then he worked in the medical laboratory of his cousin, who was a doctor, in Galveston, Texas. He was granted a track and field scholarship at the University of Montana in Missoula, Montana.

== Career ==
Braeden accumulated many TV and film credits during his first two decades in America, and guest-starred in 120 roles. His earliest credits were all under his birth name, Hans Gudegast.

During the 1960s, he appeared in several episodes of TV's longest-running World War II drama (1962–1967) Combat!, always playing a German soldier. In 1965, he appeared in a film called Morituri starring Marlon Brando and Yul Brynner, and guest-starred in The Man from U.N.C.L.E. as T.H.R.U.S.H. agent Mr. Oakes in "The Discotheque Affair", season two, episode five.

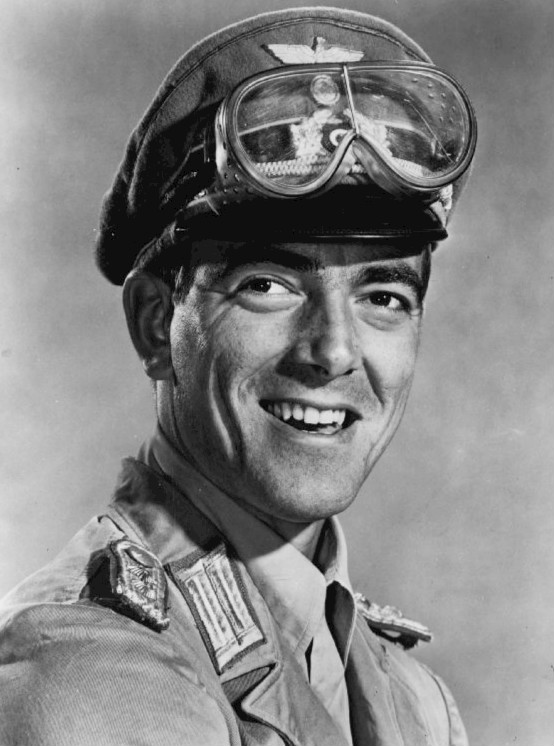
Braeden in The Rat Patrol, 1966

In 1966, he guest-starred as Luftwaffe Major Bentz in episode 28, "Day of Reckoning", of season two of the TV series Twelve O'Clock High (a series which was very loosely based on the classic 1949 war film with the same name) and also appeared in an episode of the 1966 espionage drama series Blue Light. His main character for the next two years was his regular starring role playing German Hauptmann (Captain) Hans Dietrich on the TV series The Rat Patrol (1966–1968),

He starred in the 1969 Western 100 Rifles with Raquel Welch, Burt Reynolds, and Jim Brown (noted for the first big-screen interracial love scene between Welch and Brown), once again playing a villainous German military officer opposite Fernando Lamas. This was his last credit under his birth name.

His starring role in the movie Colossus: The Forbin Project (1970), was when he first took the stage name of Eric Braeden. Lew Wasserman of Universal Pictures told him that no one would be allowed to star in an American film with a German name. After much thought, he took the name Braeden from his hometown of Bredenbek.

His other movie appearances in the 1970s included the role of Dr. Otto Hasslein in Escape from the Planet of the Apes (1971), and that of the arrogant but formidable race-car driver, Bruno von Stickle, in Walt Disney's 1977 Herbie Goes to Monte Carlo. Throughout the 1970s, he also guest-starred in a variety of television shows, including The Six Million Dollar Man, Wonder Woman, and The Mary Tyler Moore Show, and also appeared in several episodes of the long-running CBS Western series Gunsmoke.

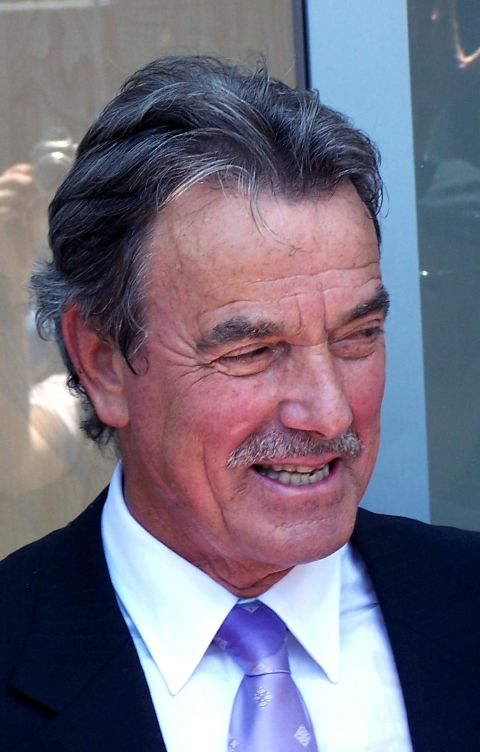
Braeden in July 2007

In addition to many episodic roles, Braeden also appeared as Colonel John Jacob Astor IV in the 1997 blockbuster film Titanic. Braeden told Cindy Elavsky that filming the scene in Titanic, in which his character drowned, "was one of the scariest moments in this business for me."

=== Victor Newman ===
In 1980, he was offered the role of self-made business magnate Victor Newman on the daytime soap opera The Young and the Restless. Initially, the role was for a 26-week run. His character imprisoned his wife's lover, and became so popular the character became a love-to-hate villain, and his contract was extended.

Braeden won a Daytime Emmy Award for his work in 1998.

In October 2009, Braeden and The Young and the Restless came to an impasse regarding contract negotiations, and press reports indicated he might leave the show. CBS later announced, though, that Braeden had signed a new three-year deal and would remain with the show, agreeing to a reduction in salary, which was the original issue.

In February 2020, Braeden celebrated his 40th anniversary with the show.

== Personal life ==
In 1958, Braeden, under his birth name Hans-Jörg Gudegast, won the Germany National Team Championship in track and field (discus, shot put, and javelin) with the Rendsburger TSV. Braeden later went on to win the 1973 National Challenge Cup as a fullback with the Jewish American soccer club Maccabee Los Angeles, scoring the winning goal in the semifinal game and a penalty kick in the championship game against Chicago Croatian. In the 1970s/80s, he could often be seen boxing at the Hoover Street and Broadway gyms in Los Angeles. He was a tennis player and has participated in many celebrity events.

He married his college sweetheart Dale Russell in 1966. Their son, Christian Gudegast, is a director who created the film Den of Thieves, starring Gerard Butler.

In January 2025 Braeden lost his Pacific Palisades home, where he lived for over 45 years, in the Palisades Fire.

=== Health ===
In April 2023, Braeden announced he was diagnosed with "high-grade" bladder cancer. He discovered his cancer diagnosis while recovering from knee-replacement surgery and while undergoing prostate-related treatment. In August 2023, Braeden revealed he was now cancer-free.

== Filmography ==
Year	Title	Role	Notes
1961	Operation Eichmann	Klaus	
1962–1964	Combat!	Corporal Hans Gruber / Sergeant Ecktmann	6 episodes
1965	Morituri	Radio Officer	Uncredited
1965	The Man from U.N.C.L.E.	Mr. Oakes	Episode: "The Discotheque Affair"
1965	12 O'Clock High	Major Gerhard Bentz / Captain Zoller	2 episodes
1966–1967	Mission: Impossible	Andrei Fetyakov / Markus Von Frank	2 episodes
1966–1968	The Rat Patrol	Captain Hans Dietrich	58 episodes
1966	The Virginian	Augustin	Episodes: "No Drums, No Trumpets"
1968	Dayton's Devils	Max Eikhart	
1969	Honeymoon with a Stranger	Frederico Caprio	ABC Movie of the Week
1969	100 Rifles	Lieutenant Franz Von Klemme	
1969–1973	Hawaii Five-O	Djebara / Klaus Marburg / Dr. Paul Farrar	3 episodes
1970	The Mask of Sheba	Dr. Morgan	TV movie
1970	Colossus: The Forbin Project	Dr. Charles A. Forbin	Lead character
1970	The Young Rebels	Major Zanker	Episode: "The Hostages"
1971	Escape from the Planet of the Apes	Dr. Otto Hasslein	
1971	Mannix	Viktor Gruniev	Episode: "Woman in the Shadows"
1971	Bearcats!	Colonel Reinert	Episode: "Dos Gringos"
1971–1974	Gunsmoke	Jack Sinclair / Talley / Carl Jaekel	5 episode
1972	The Judge and Jake Wyler	Anton Granicek	TV movie
1973	McCloud	Ravik	Episode: "The Million Dollar Round Up"
1973	Lady Ice	Peter Brinker	
1973	The Six Million Dollar Man	Findletter	TV movie
1973	Death Race	Stoeffer	ABC Movie of the Week
1973	The Adulteress	Hank Baron	
1973–1975	Barnaby Jones	Hans / Jennings / Raven / Steven Kingston	2 episodes
1974	Banacek	Paul Bolitho	Episode: "The Vanishing Chalice"
1974	The Ultimate Thrill	Roland Parlay	
1974	Kolchak: The Night Stalker	Bernhardt Stieglitz	Episode: "The Werewolf"
1974	The Rookies	Anton Jurzyck	Season 3, Episode 12 "The Assassin"
1975	Death Scream	Kosinsky	TV movie
1976	Cannon	Carl Bruckner	Episode: "The Quasar Kill"
1975–1978	Wonder Woman	Donalsen / Captain Drangel	2 episodes
1977	The Mary Tyler Moore Show	Karl Heller	Episode: "The Critic"
1977	Kojak	Kenneth Krug	Episode: "When You Hear the Beep, Drop Dead"
1977	Code Name: Diamond Head	Ernest Graeber	TV movie
1977	Herbie Goes to Monte Carlo	Bruno Von Stickle	
1978	The Eddie Capra Mysteries	Leo	Episode: "Murder! Murder!"
1978	Piranha	Dr. Robert Hoak (swimming double)	Uncredited
1979	CHiPs	Senator Bob Larwin	Episode: "MAIT Team"
1980	The Aliens Are Coming	Leonard Nero	TV movie
1980–present	The Young and the Restless	Victor Newman	
1981	Charlie's Angels	John Reardon	Episode: "Attack Angels"
1986	Airwolf	Nick Kincaid	Episode: "Birds of Paradise"
1986	Murder, She Wrote	Colonel Gerhardt Brunner	Episode: "One White Rose for Death"
1990	The Ambulance	The Doctor	
1990	Lucky Chances	Dimitri Stanislopolous	3 episodes
1993	Perry Mason: Wicked Wives	David Morrison	
1994	The Nanny	Frank Bradley Sr.	Episode: "Sunday in the Park with Fran"
1995	Diagnosis: Murder	Himself	Episode: "Death in the Daytime"
1997	Titanic	John Jacob Astor IV	
1998	Meet the Deedles	Elton Deedle	
1999	The Bold and the Beautiful	Victor Newman	4 episodes (January 25–28, 1999)
2008	The Man Who Came Back	Reese Paxton	
2008	How I Met Your Mother	Robin Scherbatsky Sr.	Episode: "Happily Ever After"
2018	Den of Thieves	"Ziggy" Zerhusen	
2026	Beyond the Gates	Victor Newman	4 episodes (June 2026)

== Awards and nominations ==
List of awards and nominations for Eric Braeden
Year	Award	Category	Work	Result	Ref.
1986	Soap Opera Digest Award	Outstanding Actor in a Leading Role on a Daytime Serial	The Young and the Restless	Nominated	
1987	Daytime Emmy Award	Outstanding Lead Actor in a Drama Series	The Young and the Restless	Nominated	
1988	Soap Opera Digest Award	Outstanding Actor in a Leading Role: Daytime	The Young and the Restless	Nominated	
1989	Soap Opera Digest Award	Outstanding Actor in a Leading Role: Daytime	The Young and the Restless	Won	'
1990	Distinguished German-American of the Year	N/A	Himself	Won	
1990	Soap Opera Digest Award	Outstanding Lead Actor: Daytime	The Young and the Restless	Nominated	
1990	Daytime Emmy Award	Outstanding Lead Actor in a Drama Series	The Young and the Restless	Nominated	
1991	Soap Opera Digest Award	Outstanding Lead Actor: Daytime	The Young and the Restless	Nominated	
1992	People's Choice Awards	Favorite Male Performer In A Daytime Serial	The Young and the Restless	Won	
1993	Soap Opera Digest Award	Hottest Male Star	The Young and the Restless	Nominated	
1994	Soap Opera Digest Award	Hottest Male Star	The Young and the Restless	Nominated	
1996	Daytime Emmy Awards	Outstanding Lead Actor in a Drama Series	The Young and the Restless	Nominated	
1997	Daytime Emmy Award	Outstanding Lead Actor in a Drama Series	The Young and the Restless	Nominated	
1997	Soap Opera Digest Award	Outstanding Lead Actor: Daytime	The Young and the Restless	Won	
1998	Daytime Emmy Award	Outstanding Lead Actor in a Drama Series	The Young and the Restless	Won	
1999	Daytime Emmy Award	Outstanding Lead Actor in a Drama Series	The Young and the Restless	Nominated	
1999	Soap Opera Digest Award	Outstanding Lead Actor	The Young and the Restless	Nominated	
2000	Soap Opera Digest Award	Favourite Actor	The Young and the Restless	Nominated	
2001	Soap Opera Digest Award	Outstanding Lead Actor	The Young and the Restless	Won	
2000	Daytime Emmy Award	Outstanding Lead Actor in a Drama Series	The Young and the Restless	Nominated	
2004	Daytime Emmy Award	Outstanding Lead Actor in a Drama Series	The Young and the Restless	Nominated	
2005	Soap Opera Digest Award	Outstanding Lead Actor	The Young and the Restless	Nominated	
2007	Hollywood Walk of Fame	N/A	Himself	Won	
2007	Gilmore Award the Pacific Pioneers, a radio and television industry group	N/A	Himself	Won	
2009	Friend of German Award from the American Association of Teachers of German	N/A	Himself	Won	
2017	Soap Awards France	Best Villain of the Year	The Young and the Restless	Won	
2018	Soap Awards France	Best Actor of the Year	The Young and the Restless	Nominated	
2018	Soap Awards France	Best Villain of the Year	The Young and the Restless	Nominated	
2020	Soap Hub Awards	Favorite The Young and the Restless Actor	The Young and the Restless	Won	
2024	Daytime Emmy Award	Outstanding Lead Actor in a Drama Series	The Young and the Restless	Nominated	
2026	Daytime Emmy Award	Outstanding Lead Actor in a Drama Series	The Young and the Restless	Nominated	

== See also ==
- Victor and Nikki Newman
- Supercouple
- German-American Heritage Foundation of the USA
