= South (magazine) =

The South magazine is a bi-monthly lifestyle magazine published in Savannah, Georgia. It was founded in 2005 by Michael Brooks. The magazine focuses on Southern culture, dining, events, entertainment, and personalities, celebrating the style and heritage of the contemporary South. The publication has an audited circulation of 19,500 per issue and a readership of 80,000. In 2011, South magazine was presented with eight awards during the 22nd Annual Magazine Association GAMMA Awards.
