= Eric LeMarque =

American-French ice hockey player and author

- Born: July 1, 1969 (age 57); Paris, France
- Education: Northern Michigan University
- Occupation: Writer
Ice hockey career
- Height: 5 ft 10 in (178 cm)
- Weight: 172 lb (78 kg; 12 st 4 lb)
- Position: Center
- Shot: Right
- Played for: Briançon; Greensboro Monarchs; Valenciennes HHC; Dragons de Rouen; Brest Albatros Hockey; EC Pfaffenhofen IceHogs; Arkansas GlacierCats
- National team: France
- NHL draft: 224th overall, 1987; Boston Bruins
- Playing career: 1990–1999

Eric LeMarque (born July 1, 1969) is an American-French author and a former professional ice hockey player. During his ice hockey career, he was a member of the French national ice hockey team and competed with the team at the 1994 Winter Olympics.

== Early life ==
LeMarque was born in Paris, France and grew up in the West Hills and Pacific Palisades, two neighborhoods of Los Angeles.

== Hockey career ==
Growing up in the United States, he played Division I college ice hockey with the Northern Michigan University Wildcats from 1987 to 1991. He was drafted by the Boston Bruins of the NHL at 17 years old with the 224th pick in the 1987 draft. He played the majority of his career in France, where he won three straight national championships from 1994 to 1996, and in Germany. He was selected to the French national ice hockey team and competed with the team at the 1994 Winter Olympics in Lillehammer, Norway, where he netted one goal in five games, and at the IHW World Championships in 1994 and 1995. He retired from hockey during the 1999–2000 season and took up snowboarding focusing on the X-Games.

== Later life ==
On February 6, 2004, LeMarque became trapped in the Sierra Nevada Mountains wilderness. He survived for eight days by living in a makeshift igloo and eating pine nuts and cedar. He was unable to find his way back to Mammoth Mountain Ski Area after eight days and almost 10 miles of hiking through deep snow and sub-freezing temperatures. Searchers found Eric sprawled in the snow, conscious but barely moving. On the eighth day, help came when a helicopter rescue crew found LeMarque via infrared imaging they used to locate his body heat. At that point, he was suffering from severe frostbite, hypothermia and dehydration. Once at the hospital, doctors determined his legs would have to be amputated six inches below each knee. After a long recovery he was fitted with modern prosthetics having to relearn how to use his legs all over again.

In 2017, the movie 6 Below: Miracle on the Mountain was released based on the book Crystal Clear by LeMarque.
