= Christian Gudegast =

German writer

- Born: February 9, 1970 (age 56); United States
- Occupations: Screenwriter, filmmaker
- Years active: 1997–present
- Father: Eric Braeden

Christian Gudegast (born February 9, 1970) is an American writer, filmmaker, and director.

== Biography ==
Born February 9, 1970, via caesarian section, Gudegast is the only child of Eric Braeden and Dale Russell Gudegast. He began his career as a rap music-video director and sold his first script, Black Ocean (co-written with his former partner Paul Scheuring), to Oliver Stone in 1993, launching his screenwriting career. He has done uncredited rewrites and production polishes on several major studio releases.

Other writing credits include A Man Apart (2003) and London Has Fallen (2016), as well as both 2018's Den of Thieves and its 2025 sequel, each of which Gudegast also directed.

== Filmography ==
Year	Title	Credited as			Notes
Year	Title	Director	Writer	Producer	Notes
2003	A Man Apart	No	Yes	No	Co-wrote with Paul Scheuring
2008	The Man Who Came Back	No	No	Yes	
2016	London Has Fallen	No	Yes	No	Co-wrote with Creighton Rothenberger, Katrin Benedikt and Chad St. John
2018	Den of Thieves	Yes	Yes	Executive	Directorial debut Co-wrote with Scheuring
2023	Plane	No	Uncredited	Executive	Additional literary material
2025	Den of Thieves 2: Pantera	Yes	Yes	Executive	
2025	Afterburn	No	Uncredited	No	Additional literary material Post-production
TBA	Empire State	Yes	TBA	TBA	Filming
