= Andreas Johnson discography =

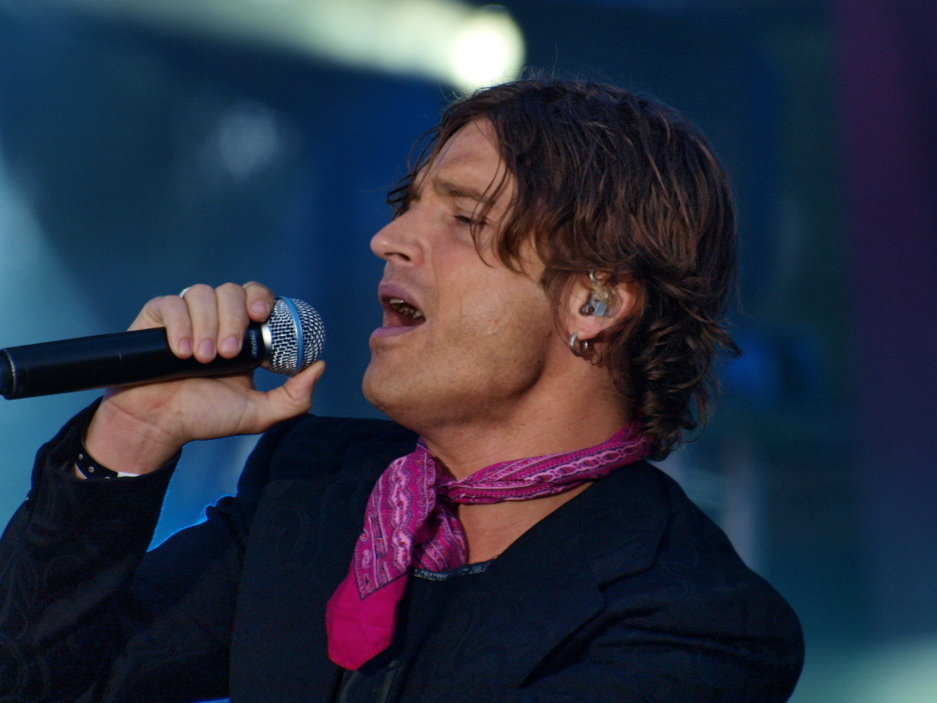
- Andreas Johnson at Rix FM Festival in Kungsträdgården, Stockholm
- Studio albums: 6
- Compilation albums: 1
- Singles: 19

This is the discography of Andreas Johnson, a Swedish pop rock singer-songwriter, consists of six studio albums, a compilation album, nineteen singles, and eight music videos. In 1996, Johnson signed a recording contract with EMI and released his debut studio album, Cottonfish Tales, in April 1997. Though critically acclaimed, the record was less than a success commercially. The first single released through his new contract with Warner Music Sweden, entitled "Glorious," topped the charts, reaching number three on the Italian Singles Chart, number four on the UK Singles Chart, and number eight on the Billboard's Hot Dance Club Songs. In 2000, "Glorious" received the gold certification by the Swedish Recording Industry Association (GLF) for distribution of over ten thousand singles. Johnson released his second album, Liebling, in May 1999. The album sold 500,000 units and was followed by extensive touring, during which Johnson began work on his third solo record.

Deadly Happy was released in February 2002 and peaked at number 45 on the Sverigetopplistan chart. The second single from the album, "Sing for Me," was certified gold by the GLF. Taking a long break from public commitments, Johnson returned with Mr. Johnson, Your Room Is on Fire in November 2005, generating successful singles like "Show Me Love" and "Sunshine of Mine." He released his first compilation album, The Collector, in March 2007. The Collector is his most successful record to date; it charted on Billboard's European Top 100 Albums and was certified gold by the GLF for distribution of over twenty thousand albums. The compilation generated the gold single "A Little Bit of Love," that peaked at number three on the Sverigetopplistan chart. In 2008, Johnson released his fifth album, Rediscovered, which peaked at number 29 on the Sverigetopplistan chart.

== Studio albums ==
Year	Album details	Peak chart positions				
Year	Album details	SWE	AUT	FRA	NOR	UK
1997	Cottonfish Tales: Released: April 28, 1997; Label: EMI; Format: CD, digital download	—	—	—	—	—
1999	Liebling: Released: May 25, 1999; Label: Warner; Format: CD, digital download	21	36	124	27	46
2002	Deadly Happy: Released: February 11, 2002; Label: Warner; Format: CD, digital download	45	—	—	—	—
2005	Mr. Johnson, Your Room is on Fire^{[A]}: Released: November 2, 2005; Label: Warner; Format: CD, digital download	5	—	—	—	—
2008	Rediscovered: Released: October 29, 2008; Label: Warner; Format: CD, digital download	29	—	—	—	—
2012	Village Idiot: Released: February 29, 2012; Label: Warner; Format: CD, digital download	17	—	—	—	—
"—" denotes releases that did not chart or were not released in that country.

Notes

- A Mr. Johnson, Your Room Is On Fire was re-released with new cover artwork and two new tracks on March 22, 2006.

== Compilation albums ==
Year	Album details	Peak chart positions					Certifications
Year	Album details	SWE	AUT	FRA	NOR	UK	Certifications
2007	The Collector: Released: March 7, 2007; Label: Warner; Format: CD, digital download	3	—	—	—	—	SWE: Gold
2010	Tour Edition: Released: September 15, 2010; Label: Warner; Format: CD	—	—	—	—	—	
"—" denotes releases that did not chart or were not released in that country.

== Singles ==
Year	Single	Peak chart positions											Certifications	Album
Year	Single	SWE	FIN	FRA	GER	IRE	ITA	NED	NZ	NOR	SWI	UK	Certifications	Album
1996	"Seven Days"	—	—	—	—	—	—	—	—	—	—	—		Cottonfish Tales
1997	"Cruel"	—	—	—	—	—	—	—	—	—	—	—		Cottonfish Tales
1997	"Crush"	—	—	—	—	—	—	—	—	—	—	—		Cottonfish Tales
1999	"Glorious"	13	—	16	79	13	3	51	41	16	40	4	SWE: Gold	Liebling
1999	"The Games We Play"	56	19	—	—	—	—	—	—	—	—	41		Liebling
2000	"People"	—	—	—	—	—	—	—	—	—	—	—		Liebling
2002	"Shine"	33	—	—	—	—	—	—	—	—	—	—		Deadly Happy
2002	"End of the World"	—	—	—	—	—	—	—	—	—	—	—		Deadly Happy
2002	"Waterfall"	—	—	—	—	—	—	—	—	—	—	—		Deadly Happy
2005	"Show Me Love"	20	—	—	—	—	—	—	—	—	—	—		Mr. Johnson, Your Room Is On Fire
2006	"Fools Like Us"	—	—	—	—	—	—	—	—	—	—	—		Mr. Johnson, Your Room Is On Fire
2006	"Sing for Me"	2	—	—	—	—	—	—	—	—	—	—	SWE: Gold	Mr. Johnson, Your Room Is On Fire
2006	"Sunshine of Mine"	—	—	—	—	—	—	—	—	—	—	—		Mr. Johnson, Your Room Is On Fire
2007	"A Little Bit of Love"	3	—	—	—	—	—	—	—	—	—	—	SWE: Gold	The Collector
2007	"Go For the Soul"	—	—	—	—	—	—	—	—	—	—	—		The Collector
2008	"Lucky Star" (with Carola Häggkvist)	13	—	—	—	—	—	—	—	—	—	—		non-album single
2008	"One Love" (with Carola Häggkvist)	11	—	—	—	—	—	—	—	—	—	—		Tour Edition
2008	"Do You Wanna Dance"	—	—	—	—	—	—	—	—	—	—	—		Rediscovered
2009	"Escape"	11	—	—	—	—	—	—	—	—	—	—		Tour Edition
2010	"We Can Work It Out"	9	—	—	—	—	—	—	—	—	—	—		Tour Edition
2010	"Solace"	—	—	—	—	—	—	—	—	—	—	—		Tour Edition
2011	"One Man Army"	—	—	—	—	—	—	—	—	—	—	—		Village Idiot
2011	"Buzzin' "	—	—	—	—	—	—	—	—	—	—	—		Village Idiot
2011	"I dag kommer aldrig mer" (with Niklas Strömstedt as Hagsätra Sport)	—	—	—	—	—	—	—	—	—	—	—		non-album single
2012	"Lovelight"	—	—	—	—	—	—	—	—	—	—	—		Village Idiot
2012	"Hagsätra IP" (with Niklas Strömstedt as Hagsätra Sport)	—	—	—	—	—	—	—	—	—	—	—		non-album single
2013	"Vintersaga"	—	—	—	—	—	—	—	—	—	—	—		non-album single
2014	"Bring on the Sun" (Yanou feat. Andreas Johnson)	—	—	—	—	—	—	—	—	—	—	—		non-album single
2014	"Hearts on Fire" (with Brolle)	—	—	—	—	—	—	—	—	—	—	—		non-album single
2015	"Living to Die"	109 (Note: "Living to Die" did not enter the Top 100 Swedish Singellista Chart, but peaked at number nine on the Swedish Heatseeker Chart dated 19 March 2015 (week 12))	—	—	—	—	—	—	—	—	—	—		non-album single
2016	"Just For Christmas"	—	—	—	—	—	—	—	—	—	—	—		non-album single
2018	"Your Christmas Story"	—	—	—	—	—	—	—	—	—	—	—		non-album single
2019	"Army of Us"	52	—	—	—	—	—	—	—	—	—	—		non-album single
"—" denotes releases that did not chart or were not released in that country.

== See also ==
- Carola Häggkvist discography
