= Cryoshell (album) =

Studio album by Cryoshell
- Released: June 7, 2010
- Recorded: 2008–April 2010
- Studio: Hansen Studios (Ribe, Denmark)
- Genre: Alternative rock; symphonic rock; neoclassical metal; nu metal; hard rock
- Length: 40:34
- Label: Cryoshell I/S; VME
- Producer: Jacob Hansen

Cryoshell chronology
Creeping in My Soul (2010)	Cryoshell (2010)	Next to Machines

Singles from Cryoshell
- 1. "Bye Bye Babylon" Released: July 19, 2009; 2. "Creeping in My Soul" Released: November 29, 2009

Cryoshell is the self-titled debut studio album by Danish rock band Cryoshell, released June 7, 2010 by Voices Music & Entertainment. Produced by Jacob Hansen, the album was recorded between late 2008 and April 2010 at Hansen Studios in Ribe, Denmark.

Prior to recording, Cryoshell was best known for producing soundtrack music for Bionicle, a popular series of construction toys manufactured by Lego, that featured in the promotional material for various sets released between 2007 and 2009. This made Lego partially responsible for the band's formation. The album was originally announced for a late 2008 release, but was pushed back numerous times before receiving its initial Scandinavian release; the band secured international publication between 2011 and 2012.

Cryoshell received generally positive feedback. Lead singer Christine Lorentzen's vocal style was applauded, as well as the cinematic quality of each track. The band's sound was compared to the American rock band Evanescence, while criticism was put towards songs' lyrics.

The album sprawled two singles: "Bye Bye Babylon" and "Creeping in My Soul", released in July and November 2009, respectively.

== Background and recording ==
Between 2006 and 2009, Cryoshell produced songs for the Lego toy line Bionicle that featured in visual media promoting new sets. The songs, released as free MP3 downloads from the official Bionicle website, proved popular, with one, "Creeping in My Soul", becoming the #1 most downloaded file from the Lego website around its time of release in 2007. After releasing the song "Closer to the Truth" under the band name Cryoshell for Bionicle's Mistika wave in October 2008, the group announced plans to record a full-length album.

The entire album was recorded, produced and mixed by Jacob Hansen at Hansen Studios in Ribe, Northern Denmark. Demos were recorded in late 2008, with lead production commencing in early 2009 and wrapping by April 2010. The first song produced was "Bye Bye Babylon" for Bionicle's 2009 marketing campaign. To match the album's production quality, the tracks "Creeping in My Soul" and "Closer to the Truth", which were previously produced for Bionicle in 2006 and 2008 respectively, were re-recorded. Additionally, there were plans to re-record "Face Me" and "Gravity Hurts", two other songs used by Bionicle but originally sung by Danish singer Niels Brinck, with Lorentzen, but they were ultimately scrapped. A classical remix of "Gravity Hurts" sung by Lorentzen was eventually released in 2018, featuring the Budapest Art Orchestra.

== Composition ==
Each track on the album is generally a rock song of alternative and symphonic styles, as well as cinematic-like elements that stem from neoclassical metal and power pop. On composing new songs, the band would create a melody on either an acoustic guitar or a piano and build it up from there, with lyrics added later. As a large number of the album's songs were either previously used or considered for Lego's Bionicle campaigns, the lyrics consequently allude to elements from the franchise's storyline.

The album's opening number "Creeping in My Soul" was written by keyboardist Mikkel Maltha with established Danish composer Anthony Lledo in 2006, originally for Bionicle's Barraki marketing campaign. Labelled as a progressive rock song, its lyrics allude to the franchise's 2007 story of taking place deep under the sea and what mysteries the seabed might hold. The following track "Bye Bye Babylon", co-written by all three band members, uniquely features distinctive Eastern musical elements. The songs "Trigger", "Feed" and "Falling" – all co-written by Lorentzen and guitarist Kasper Søderlund – are upbeat, symphonic numbers that feature more power pop and pop rock elements. The two also wrote the nu metal number "Come to My Heaven".

Søderlund co-wrote the melodic track "Murky" with Maltha, the latter of whom penned the soft rock ballad "The Room" and the more symphonic number "Closer to the Truth", the latter of which was originally composed for Bionicle's 2008 Mistika campaign, and like "Creeping in My Soul", alludes to story elements from the franchise. The album's closing number "No More Words" was solely composed by Lorentzen; a classical ballad that features higher levels of orchestral arrangements with no guitar work; putting emphasis on Lorentzen's vocals.

== Promotion ==
Cryoshell released the digital extended play Creeping in My Soul on January 5, 2010, serving as a teaser for the then-forthcoming album by featuring five completed songs.

In a video blog uploaded onto Cryoshell's official YouTube channel on May 30, 2010, Lorentzen stated that due to the album's limited release in Denmark as well as ongoing support from fans worldwide, the band were prepared to release the songs "Feed" and "The Room" from the album for free on June 7 to fans who added them as a friend on YouTube before that date, while they continued to work on securing a global release.

In June 2010, the band were interviewed on the Danish TV talk show The Lounge and performed an acoustic version of the track "Trigger".

=== Singles ===
Cryoshell's lead single "Bye Bye Babylon" was released on July 19, 2009, with its music video premiering on Cryoshell's official website the following August. A version featuring an alternative 'clean' lyric was released on August 27, 2009 as a free MP3 download from the official Bionicle website, serving as key promotional music for the toy line's Glatorian and Glatorian Legends sets of that year, as well as the official soundtrack to the film Bionicle: The Legend Reborn. A second music video utilizing this version premiered on August 31, 2009.

"Creeping in My Soul" was released as the album's second single on November 29, 2009. Its music video premiered on Cryoshell's official YouTube channel on April 19, 2010. An earlier take of the song that was used in the promotional campaign for Bionicle's Barraki toy wave was released as a free MP3 download from the official Bionicle website in March 2007, becoming the #1 most requested download from the server at the time.

=== Other songs ===
An earlier version of "Closer to the Truth", originally used as promotional music in advertising Bionicle's Mistika toy wave, was released as a free download from the official Bionicle website on October 1, 2008. Its music video followed on October 8. The video was re-released on January 7, 2010, onto Cryoshell's official YouTube channel featuring the re-recorded mix.

A video of the band rehearsing an acoustic version of "No More Words" was filmed in Copenhagen, Denmark in late 2013 and released on February 23, 2014. It was recorded and edited by Hannibal Lang-Jensen with Christian Faber and the advertising agency Advance.

== Release ==
Originally announced for a late 2008 release, the album was postponed to early 2009, however, the band spent the majority of the year recording new material instead; pushing its release to the fall, before it was pushed again to January 30, 2010, when recording sessions were still in progress. The date passed without a release.

Cryoshell later announced an official release date of June 7, 2010, but due to difficulties in securing a worldwide release, the album was initially only published in Scandinavia; self-published under the band's own label, Cryoshell I/S, and Voices Music & Entertainment (VME). Cryoshell received later publication in other countries between 2011 and 2012 through different record labels. Although physical CD copies were produced, they have been described as difficult to obtain.

The band later announced that the album would be re-issued globally under Greek record label, The Leaders, with two bonus tracks – "Breakout" (singly released in December 2012) and a remix of "Gravity Hurts" – both featuring Danish singer Tine Midtgaard filling in for Lorentzen while the latter took maternity leave. However, a release date for the re-issue was never announced and is thought to have been scrapped.

== Reception ==
=== Original release ===
Professional ratings
Review scores
Source	Rating
Album Check	9/10 stars
Enemy	(4/5)
Eyes from the Mosh Pit	7/10 stars
Gaffa	3/6 stars
Greek Rebels	(7.5/10)
MetalZone	4/6 stars
The Power of Metal	74%
RockHard	(6/10)
Sputnikmusic	4/5 stars
Stiften	2/6 stars

The original release of the album has been met with generally positive reviews from music critics. Sputnikmusic gave the album 4 out of 5 stars and compared Cryoshell's sound to bands Evanescence, Within Temptation and Linkin Park. They praised lead singer Christine Lorentzen's vocal talents "[soaring] above the instrument mixes," especially on the tracks "Trigger" and "Falling", and how the band "has bigger things in mind than mere promotional songs" and that "String synthesizers, broken chords played on the piano, and driving background electric guitars set an eerie yet powerful mood throughout the album." They however felt that the group lacked lyrically, saying "they range from weak attempts at poetry to straightforward and radio-ready."

RockHard praised Lorenzen's voice as a "very beautiful complexion" with "incredible dynamics" and the reason why the band does not go completely unnoticed. Gaffa gave a mixed review' calling Cryoshell "the Danish equivalent of Evanescence" and classifying them as product placement due to their history with working with Lego. However, they praised the production of producer Jacob Hansen for "getting much out of a small budget" and gave the album 3 out of 6 stars. Stiften described the album as "Heavy and lumbering pathos rock on a bed of melodic keyboard surfaces and strings" calling it "Not a bad offer... [but] does nothing new under the sun relative to the template-band Evanescence who have to suffer the indignity of seeing the shame-plagiarized on Cryoshell's debut."

Danish metal music blog MetalZone called the band "A copy of Evanescence," adding "It's fine to be inspired by a band, but to make a clone of the band is perhaps excessive." They however gave the album 4 out of 6 stars." German music blog Album Check were more positive, giving the album 9 out of 10 stars and describing it as "cinemascope rock," going on to complementing the band as "bursting with passion with good hooks and melodious tunes, the sound of Cryoshell has its own style," with Lorentzen "not only [having] a pretty face, but a lot to offer musically." Enemy, another German music blog, defined Cryoshell as a "darkly symphonic Danish export" and their sound as "Classic dark and foggy converts the trio in their sound-scape" and "a mixture of orchestral elements, piano melodies, coupled with electronic parts and a rocking female voice," adding that the track "'Creeping in My Soul' carries a refrain," giving the album an overall rating of 4 out of 5.

The Power of Metal described the album's sound as "Classic rock spiced up with some more modern influences," and applauded Lorentzen as a "figurehead" and "vital part" of the band who helps to "[Create] a sound that contains moods that are hard, raw, yet fragile and classical." They also praised Hansen's production that gave the band "A balanced and raw rock sound that fit their style very well" that provides the album "Many fine moments and enough catchy tunes to give them a solid foundation for bigger things" and giving Cryoshell an overall rating of 74%. Eyes from the Mosh Pit stated the album has "slick riffs, pounding drums and very dramatic almost end of the world themed lyrics," the tracks with stringed compositions had "a apocalyptic feel" and praised "Bye Bye Babylon" and "Closer to the Truth" as stand out songs in terms of their orchestral arrangements as "they add a film score-like quality to [the tracks]," and gave the album a total of 7 out of 10 stars. Rocktopia were also positive, declaring that all the songs were "full of catchiness" and "equally contagious" and singled out "Bye Bye Babylon" as the best song on the album.

=== Reissue ===
Professional ratings
Review scores
Source	Rating
The Power of Metal	(70/100)
RavenHeart Music	(10/10)

The unreleased reissue of Cryoshell has been met to critical acclaim. RavenHeart Music gave the album a perfect 10 out of 10 score, calling it "one of the best debuts for years" and that Cryoshell "have the songs, the sound and the look and could make the USA their own with this record alone" while also praising Lorenzten's vocals as "magnificent" with contrasts to Cristina Scabbia and Shania Twain. Greek Rebels also praised Lorentzen's vocals and how the songs "stick in the mind with catchy melodies." They described the bonus songs as "slightly more diversified and dynamic," making the listener want to replay them repeatedly, giving the album a ranking of 7.5 out of 10. The Power of Metal also reviewed the reissue and gestured the album's sound as "more grown-up" and "diversified and universal" in comparison to Evanescence's sound. They also commented on how Cryoshell's music is not "designed to catch the listener with hook over hook", but rather "lets [them] discover the beauty of their music".

== Track listing ==
No.	Title	Writer(s)	Length
1.	"Creeping in My Soul"	Mikkel Maltha; Anthony Lledo	3:59
2.	"Bye Bye Babylon"	Maltha; Kasper Søderlund; Christine Lorentzen	4:37
3.	"Trigger"	Søderlund; Lorentzen	3:52
4.	"Feed"	Søderlund; Lorentzen	4:19
5.	"Closer to the Truth"	Maltha	4:02
6.	"Falling"	Søderlund; Lorentzen	4:26
7.	"The Room"	Maltha	4:04
8.	"Come to My Heaven"	Søderlund; Lorentzen	3:53
9.	"Murky"	Maltha; Søderlund	3:56
10.	"No More Words"	Lorentzen	3:42
Total length:			40:34

Notes

- Tracks 1, 2, 5, 6 and 9 also appear on the EP Creeping in My Soul.
- "Bye Bye Babylon" is shortened on its single release.

== Personnel ==
Band

- Christine Lorentzen – Lead vocals
- Kasper Søderlund – Guitars, bass guitar, additional keys
- Mikkel Maltha – Piano, keyboard, orchestral arrangements, additional vocals (track 1)
- Jakob Gundel – Drums

Production

- Produced, engineered, mixed and mastered by Jacob Hansen and Cryoshell
- Recorded at Hansen Studios in Ribe, Denmark
- Photography and artwork: Christian Faber
- Management: KNOKL

Special thanks

- Advance
- Eddie Simonsen
- Jeppe Fannesback
- Charlotte Rvéde Jensen
- Thomas Nielsen
- Trine Schou
- Jacob Mansen
- Anthony Lledo
- Zentropa Film
- Minerva Film
- Peter Jhorth
- Andres Wellike
- Lalo Magnus
- Anna August
- Lisbeth Bech
- Søren Bendz

== Release history ==
Region	Date	Format	Label
Denmark	June 7, 2010	CD; digital download	Cryoshell I/S; VME
Norway	June 7, 2010	CD; digital download	Cryoshell I/S; VME
Sweden	June 7, 2010	CD; digital download	Cryoshell I/S; VME
Japan	February 9, 2011	CD; digital download	Indies Japan; Zoom
Worldwide	February 9, 2011	Digital download	Cryoshell I/S
Germany	September 16, 2011	CD; digital download	Soul Food; VME
United Kingdom	November 3, 2011	CD	Voices of Wonder
Worldwide	February 10, 2012	CD	Cryoshell I/S; VME
