= A Friend in London =

Indie pop and rock band from Denmark

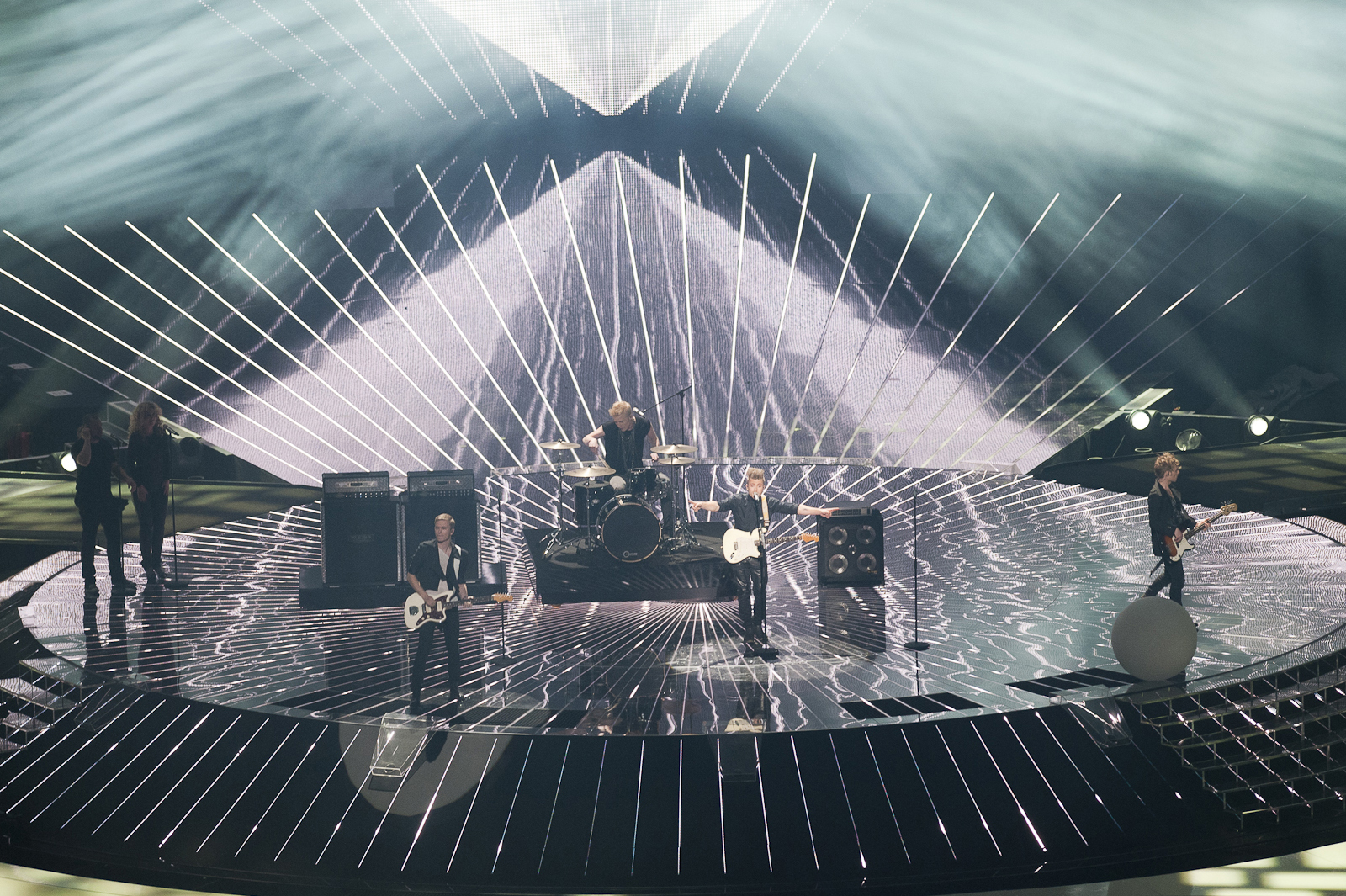
- A Friend in London at Eurovision

Background information
- Origin: Vostrup, Denmark
- Genres: Soft rock, alternative rock, pop rock
- Years active: 2005–2014
- Label: ArtPeople (2012–2014)
- Past members: Aske Damm Bramming (2005–2013); Esben Svane (2005–2013); Sebastian Vinther Olsen (2005–2013); Tim Schou (2005–2014); Jesper Madsen (2013–2014); Johan Jørgensen (2013–2014); Thomas Duus (2013–2014)

A Friend in London was a Danish pop rock and rock band that represented Denmark in the Eurovision Song Contest 2011 in Düsseldorf, Germany, with the song "New Tomorrow" and took fifth place in the final with 134 points. The group announced their split in 2014.

== Career ==
A Friend in London (also known by its acronym AFIL) was formed in 2005 when the band members were at a boarding school in Vostrup, Denmark. The lead singer, Tim Schou, won the contest Danish Young Talent 2005 which led to the recording of the band's first single, "Thoughts of a Boheme".

The Danish national radio station P3 picked up on the sounds of the band, providing airplay for the single "Shoot Me". Danish TV station TV2 used the band's track "Dead Beat" in a TV-commercial contest.

The band started touring Denmark extensively with more than 100 different gigs. Their break came in 2008 with the Bodog Million Dollar Battle of the Bands where they won the European leg of the competition reaching the final 10 qualifying round in the United States. The band refused to continue further with the competition, because of complexity of contractual aspects the organizers wanted to impose on them and other participants.

Following that, they toured Canada and the United States. The band became very popular in Canada, where since 2009 they have made three successful tours, the last being in 2011. The tour included shows in June 2009 at NXNE (North by NorthEast) and Canadian Music Week as well as a performance at Breakfast TV, a major morning show in Toronto. They ended up signing a management agreement with a Canadian music group.

=== 2011: Eurovision Song Contest ===
A Friend in London took part in 2011 version of the Dansk Melodi Grand Prix with their song "New Tomorrow" written by Lise Cabble and Jakob Glæsner, winning the Danish preselection show and to go to represent Denmark in the 2011 Eurovision Song Contest. There was controversy and allegations that chorus of the song was plagiarized from a Chinese folk song "Silk Road" and big similarities with three other songs named: Andreas Johnson’s "Sing for Me" that participated in Melodifestivalen 2006, the German group Future Trance United's song "Face 2 Face", which itself was a cover from the song "Herz an Herz" from the German band Paso Doble from the year 1986, and Take That's "Shine". One of the co-writers Jacob Glæsner commented that "the song is very popular in its expression and consist basically only of five tones. It is unavoidable that it doesn’t remind of a song one have already heard". Partly because of the criticism, the band has confirmed in interviews they will make changes to the song prior to presenting it in the Düsseldorf 2011 finals.

A Friend in London performed the song at the Eurovision 2011 and finished fifth, but caused controversy when lead singer Tim Schou said in front of a live audience "You know baby, I want to...I want to fuck you!" after Dutch singer Mandy Huydts announced that the Netherlands had awarded the song "New Tomorrow" twelve points. Schou later stated: "When the camera came and we got the first points I was so excited. I apologise, Europe! I apologise! We got the fifth place, baby!".

=== 2012–14: Unite and breakup ===
The band released their debut album Unite on 21 January 2013, having pre-released the tracks "New Tomorrow", "Calling a Friend" and "Get Rich in Vegas" in advance.

Prior to the release of the album, they supported New Kids on the Block and the Backstreet Boys during their European tour. As a result, Howie D. of the Backstreet Boys is featured on a remake of "New Tomorrow". The track featuring Howie D. is found as a bonus track on the iTunes Deluxe Version. The album also featured the Canadian singer Carly Rae Jepsen on the track "Rest from the Streets".

The original band broke up in 2013 with three of the original members, Aske Damm Bramming, Esben Svane and Sebastian Vinther Olsen leaving. Páll "Tim" Schou continued with the band for a token period 2013 to 2014 with new members Jesper Madsen, Johan Jørgensen and Thomas Duus included. But after just a few months, Schou announced the band was folding for good.

== In popular culture ==
Páll Schou, the lead vocalist of the band took part in the inaugural season of the reality television show Skjulte stjerner (meaning Hidden star) aired from 2 September to 14 October 2011 on Danish television. He introduced a young new Danish artist called Thomas Meilstrup mentoring him throughout the show and singing duets with him. Thomas and his mentor won the series and Thomas Meilstrup released his debut single "Almost There" featuring Tim Schou.

The band's single "New Tomorrow" was used as the basis for the spaceflight documentary, Challenging Endeavours: A tale of two shuttles, that premiered on YouTube in February 2013.

== Members ==
- Páll "Tim" Schou – lead vocals, guitar (2005–2014)
- Aske Damm Bramming – bass, backing vocals (2005–2013)
- Esben Svane – drums, backing vocals (2005–2013)
- Sebastian Vinther Olsen – guitar, backing vocals (2005–2013)
- Johan Jørgensen – guitar, backing vocals (2013–2014)
- Jesper Madsen – bass, backing vocals (2013–2014)
- Thomas Duus – drums, backing vocals (2013–2014)

== Discography ==
=== Albums ===
Album Title	Album Details	Peak chart positions
Album Title	Album Details	DEN
Smukfest 2012 (live)	Release date: 29 October 2012; Label: Next2Live; Format: digital download	-
Unite	Release date: 21 January 2013; Label: ArtPeople; Format: CD, digital download	14

=== Extended plays ===
Title	Details	Track list
A Friend in London EP	Release date: 3 November 2009; Label: Fontana North; Format: digital download	1. What A Way (3:33); 2. The Light (2:37); 3. Freddie (4:40)

=== Singles ===
Year	Title	Peak chart positions						Album
Year	Title	DEN	BEL (FLA)	IRE	NL	SWI	UK	Album
2009	"What A Way"	9	—	—	—	—	—	A Friend In London EP
2011	"New Tomorrow"	2	94	9	58	39	78	Unite
2012	"Calling a Friend"	—	—	—	—	—	—	Unite
2012	"Get Rich in Vegas"	—	—	—	—	—	—	Unite
"—" denotes single that did not chart or was not released in that territory.

=== Other songs ===
- "Thoughts of a Boheme" (2005)
- "Dead Beat"
- "Easy" (3 June 2006)
- "Solo Machine" (2010)
- "Break and Fall"
- "New Tomorrow" – Song for Africa (4 October 2011)
- "Gorgeous" Christmas song (Dec-2011) re-recorded as "Christmas Love" (27 November 2012)
- "New Tomorrow" (feat. Howie D) (2012)
- "New Tomorrow" (vs. Crystal Lake) (2012)
- "Rest from the Streets" featuring Carly Rae Jepsen (2013)

=== Videography ===
The band released music videos for various songs via Guineapig Productions.

Title	Release date	Details
The Light	Release date: 9 October 2009; Publisher: Guineapig Productions	Ib Christian Henricson – camera and editing.; Lena Nyhus – set-manager, co-director and Organizer.; Sara Samsø – director; Kenny Aleksandr – styling; Gregers Dahlin – gear and band-care.
What A Way	Release date: 28 March 2010; Publisher: Guineapig Productions	Tori Cooper – solo ballerina.; Thure Lindhardt – actor.; Ib Christian Henricson – director, editor; Lena Nyhus – director, editor, set manager/producer; Tim Schou – editor; Kenny Aleksandr – styling
Now You're Here	Release date: 15 May 2010; Publisher: Guineapig Productions	Frederikke Maarup Viskum – actress; Ib Christian Henricson – director, editor, set manager/producer; Marie Louise Henricson – director, editor, set manager/producer; Mengting Hou – editor
New Tomorrow	Release date: 9 May 2011; Publisher: Guineapig Productions	
Calling A Friend	Release date: 26 September 2011; Publisher: Guineapig Productions	Ib Christian Henricson – producer, director, film editor; Marie Louise Henricson – producer, production manager, first assistant director; Bente Deshales – production manager; Lasse Londahl Henriksen – second assistant director; Mengting Henricson – production assistant

Directors included Ib Christian Henricson, Marie Louise Henricson and Lena Nyhus

- 2008: "Shoot me"
- 2012: "Get Rich in Vegas"
- 2013: "Rest from the Streets" featuring Carly Rae Jepsen with the actress Mathilde Norholt

== After breakup ==
=== Tim Schou ===
Band member Tim Schou, in 2011, he appeared in the Danish TV show Skjulte stjerner (meaning Hidden Stars) on DR1 Danish television station as mentor and costar with the child singer Thomas Meilstrup presented by the mononym Thomas, performing many songs including a mashup of "(I've Had) The Time of My Life" / "Baby", "Over the Rainbow", a mashup of A Friend in London songs "New Tomorrow" / "Calling a Friend", a mashup of Listen (Beyoncé song)" / "Dancing on My Own" and in the final a mashup of "Moves like Jagger" / "Run to You" and a repetition of ""Over the Rainbow". Thomas alongside mentor Schou went on to win the series.

In 2013, Schou landed the leading role Hair the musical in the role of Claude. The play played at the Oestre Gasvaerk Theatre in Copenhagen, Denmark. Also in 2013, he was the winner of Danish TV show Stjerner på vippen, being the Danish version of Splash.

After the break-up of the band, Tim Schou continued a solo career. In 2014, he landed a role as Flounder in the Danish version of a Disney musical The Little Mermaid that played at The Royal Danish Theatre and opera, Copenhagen. Also in 2014, he played D'artagnan in the musical comedy The 3 Musketeers that played at the Oestre Gasvaerk Theater in Copenhagen.

In 2015, he was signed to Sony/ATV and Iceberg Publishing and engaged in a tour notably in USA, UK (supporting Aaron Carter), Germany, Sweden etc. Singles include "Supernova" in 2014, "Goodbye" in 2015, "Novocaine" and "Medicine" in 2016.

Discography

- 2011: "Almost There"
- 2014: "Supernova"
- 2015: "Goodbye"
- 2016: "Novocaine"
- 2016: "Medicine"

Preceded by Chanée and N'evergreen with "In a Moment Like This"	Denmark in the Eurovision Song Contest; 2011	Succeeded by Soluna Samay with "Should've Known Better"
