= The Collector (album) =

Compilation album by Andreas Johnson
- Released: 7 March 2007
- Genre: pop rock
- Length: 1 hour, 2 minutes
- Label: Warner Music Sweden
- Producer: Peter Kvint

Andreas Johnson chronology
Mr. Johnson, Your Room is on Fire (2006)	The Collector (2007)	Rediscovered (2008)

The Collector is an Andreas Johnson compilation album, released on 7 March 2007.

== Track listing ==
1. Go for the Soul - 3:44
2. A Little Bit of Love - 3:08
3. Glorious - 3:27
4. Sing for Me - 3:04
5. Show Me Love - 4:02
6. The Games We Play - 3:49
7. Do What You Want - 3:23
8. People - 4:11
9. Shine - 3:42
10. Seven Days - 2:55
11. Crush - 3:32
12. End of the World - 4:15
13. Waterfall - 4:19
14. Pretty Ones - 3:13
15. Superficial - 4:03
16. Still My World - 3:11

== Charts ==
=== Weekly charts ===
Chart (2007)	Peak position
Swedish Albums (Sverigetopplistan)	3

=== Year-end charts ===
Chart (2007)	Position
Swedish Albums (Sverigetopplistan)	60
