= Bye Bye Babylon =

Single by Cryoshell

from the album Cryoshell
- Released: July 19, 2009
- Recorded: 2008–2009
- Studio: Hansen Studios (Ribe, Denmark)
- Genre: Alternative rock; symphonic rock
- Length: 3:41 (single version); 4:37 (album version)
- Label: Cryoshell I/S
- Songwriter(s): Mikkel Maltha; Kasper Søderlund; Christine Lorentzen
- Producer(s): Jacob Hansen

Cryoshell singles chronology
"Bye Bye Babylon" (2009)	"Creeping in My Soul" (2009)

Music video
- "Bye Bye Babylon" on YouTube

"Bye Bye Babylon" is a song by Danish rock band Cryoshell, released as their debut single from their self-titled debut studio album on July 19, 2009. Written by Mikkel Maltha, Kasper Søderlund and Christine Lorentzen, the song was recorded between late 2008 and early 2009 and produced by Jacob Hansen. It is an alternative and symphonic rock song that also encompasses Middle Eastern musical elements.

As well as serving as their debut single, "Bye Bye Babylon" is the fifth and final song by Cryoshell used by Lego for the marketing campaign of their Bionicle toy series, this time for their Glatorian and Glatorian Legends sets of 2009, as well as the animated film Bionicle: The Legend Reborn (2009).

The song has received positive reviews from music critics, who praised its Egypt-esque melody and upbeat style as a departure from other Cryoshell songs.

== Writing and recording ==
"Bye Bye Babylon" was co-written by Mikkel Maltha, Kasper Søderlund and Christine Lorentzen and recorded at Hansen Studios in Ribe, Denmark with producer Jacob Hansen between late 2008 and early 2009 as one of the first new songs for Cryoshell's debut album. "Bye Bye Babylon" was produced with the intention of being used in the marketing campaign of Lego's Bionicle toys; the song's lyrics allude to elements from the theme's 2009 storyline. Previously, Maltha had penned and been involved in the production of four other songs used for Bionicle's marketing campaigns.

Three different versions of the song exist. Aside from its single variant and extended album cut, a "clean" version produced for Bionicle features an alternative lyric in its first verse, changed from "Or you can wish me hell" to "Be sure I will be there".

== Release and media usage ==
"Bye Bye Babylon" was released on July 19, 2009, as Cryoshell's debut single. The lyric-tweaked variant specifically produced for Bionicle was released as a free MP3 download from the official Bionicle website on the following August 27. The extended version is included on Cryoshell's debut album and the EP Creeping in My Soul.

The song was primarily used as the main musical score in the marketing campaign of Lego's 2009 Bionicle toys (namely the Glatorian and Glatorian Legends waves released in the winter and summer periods) and features in commercials and online games promoting the sets, as well as in the end credits of the animated film Bionicle: The Legend Reborn (2009). "Bye Bye Babylon" is the fifth and final Cryoshell song used by Bionicle before its 2010 discontinuation, following "Creeping in My Soul" and "Face Me" in 2007, and "Gravity Hurts" and "Closer to the Truth" in 2008.

Additionally, the song's instrumental featured as background music on the band's website around the time of the single's release.

== Reception ==
Rocktopia gave the song a positive review, applauding its "cascading riff and textured keys", "bombastic chorus" and sound of "an almost Egyptian-esque melody before a verse that drops in density with soft, chiming guitar". They also praised its upbeat-ness and how the listener "[would want to put the track] on full blast and walk around the day job office encouraging everyone to let it rip".

== Music video ==
Two music videos for "Bye Bye Babylon" were directed by Josh Nussbaum and shot at North Copenhagen Harbor on May 14, 2009. The first premiered on Cryoshell's official website in mid-August 2009, while the second version that features the clean edit of the song was produced for Bionicle and released the following August 31. The latter is also included as a bonus feature on the DVD release of Bionicle: The Legend Reborn.

=== Synopsis ===
==== Original version ====
The video begins with lead singer Christine Lorentzen in dirty and ripped clothes rummaging through piles of disused equipment in an industrial wasteland. She finds pieces of various musical instruments as she sings the first verse. She drags a guitar amplifier via a piece of rope through the wasteland, later discovering a broken guitar and throwing it into a muddy puddle. As the first chorus starts, Lorentzen is seen with guitarists Kasper Søderlund and Mikka Maltha, also wearing ripped dirty clothing, collecting parts to a drum kit. Lorentzen is later shown standing from a girder beam and observing her bandmates below.

As the second verse commences, Lorentzen scavenges the wasteland again and uncovers a guitar hidden in rubble before it is set alight. The last chorus sees the band, as well as drummer Marcus Busborg, performing with their disused instruments in an arid landscape. The final shot sees the band abandoning their instruments and walking into the distance, as the camera pans up towards the sky and a graphic of the Cryoshell logo appears.

==== Bionicle version ====
This version features the same setting of the disused industrial site and follows a similar narrative to its primal variant. However, it features alternative scenes as well as clips from Bionicle: The Legend Reborn. The video was also edited with a brighter filter.

The video starts with Cryoshell already performing in the arid landscape, followed by Lorentzen singing the first verse from inside a disused boat. The first chorus sees Lorentzen, Søderlund and Maltha performing on the girder beams, while the last half of the video shows the band again performing in the infertile setting, concluding with them walking away from where they performed.

== Track listing ==
Digital download

- "Bye Bye Babylon" – 3:41

Free MP3 download

- "Bye Bye Babylon" – 3:41

== Credits and personnel ==
Recording

- Recorded, mastered and mixed at Hansen Studios, Ribe, Denmark

Personnel

- Jacob Hansen – Production, recording, engineering, mixing
- Mikkel Maltha – Keyboards, orchestral arrangements, songwriting, composition
- Kasper Søderlund – Lead guitar, bass guitar, songwriting, composition
- Christine Lorentzen – Vocals, songwriting
- Marcus Busborg – Drums, composition

== Release history ==
Region	Date	Format	Label
Worldwide	July 19, 2009	Digital download	Cryoshell I/S
Worldwide	August 27, 2009	Free MP3 download	Cryoshell I/S
