= AFIL =

AFIL may refer to:

- All-for-Ireland League, an Irish party
- A Friend In London, a Danish music band
- Audio induction loop, also known as Audio-frequency induction loops (AFIL)
