= Hidden Star =

Hidden Star may refer to:

- Skjulte stjerner, a Danish reality television series, a.k.a. "Hidden Star"
- Meghe Dhaka Tara (1960 film), 1960 film by director Ritwik Ghatak
