= Thomas Meilstrup =

Danish singer and actor

Thomas Meilstrup also known as just Thomas (born on 23 January 1998) is a Danish singer, musician and actor.

He was in Eventyrteatret (Adventure Theatre) where he took lessons in acting, dancing and singing. He was invited to sing in the Stig Rossens Christmas special, also singing at various festivals. He also plays the piano and keyboard, usually both playing while singing during his performances.

In 2008 he played the role of Læris in the film Frode og alle de andre rødder directed by Bubber. He has also sung for cartoon series like Tordenguden Thor, in the film Far til fire på japansk, and memorably in Happy Feet Two, where he sings with the voice of the little penguin character. He also voiced the character Steven Universe in the Danish dub during the last episode of the series Steven Universe as well as Steven Universe: The Movie and Steven Universe Future.

== Winner of Skjulte stjerner ==
In 2011, he was selected by Tim Schou, the lead singer of the Danish band A Friend in London as a potential "star" that participated in the inaugural season of Skjulte stjerner (meaning "Hidden Star"). Tim Schou would mentor Thomas throughout the 8 weeks of the show from 2 September to 14 October 2010 and make various duets with him.

Date	#	Song	Original artist	Result
9 Sept 2011	Week 1	"Firework"	Katy Perry	Safe
16 Sept 2011	Week 2	"(I've Had) The Time of My Life" / "Baby"	Bill Medley and Jennifer Warnes / Justin Bieber	Safe
23 Sept 2011	Week 3	"New Tomorrow / "Calling a Friend"	A Friend in London / A Friend in London	Safe
30 Sept 2011	Week 4	"Over the Rainbow"	Judy Garland	Safe
7 Oct 2011	Semi-Final	"Listen" / "Dancing on My Own"	Beyoncé Knowles / Robyn	To the final
14 Oct 2011	Final	"Moves Like Jagger" / "Run to You"	Maroon 5 feat. Christina Aguilera / Whitney Houston	Winner
14 Oct 2011	Final	"Over the Rainbow"	Judy Garland	Winner

Thomas with his mentor partner Tim Schou won the show in the final against runners-up Mie mentored and coupled with Karen and third Emily mentored and coupled with U$O.

Thomas went on to win 250,000 Danish kroners and just after the program released his debut official song "Almost There" featuring Tim Schou.

== Personal life ==
Thomas Meilstrup is the son of Dansk Melodi Grand Prix star Gry Meilstrup (also known as Gry Johansen).

== Discography ==
=== Albums ===
Year	Album	Peak positions	Certification
Year	Album	DEN	Certification
2014	My Sound of Christmas	18	

=== Singles ===
- 2011: "Almost There" (featuring Tim Schou)

== Filmography ==
=== Live action ===
- 2008: Frode og alle de andre rødder - Læris

=== Animation ===
- 2021: Steven Universe - Steven Universe
- 2021: Steven Universe: The Movie - Steven Universe
- 2022: Steven Universe Future - Steven Universe
- 2022: Dead End: Paranormal Park - Barney Guttman (singing voice)
