= Breakout (Cryoshell song) =

Single by Cryoshell
- Released: December 9, 2012
- Recorded: 2011
- Studio: Hansen Studios (Ribe, Denmark)
- Genre: Alternative rock; pop rock; symphonic pop
- Length: 3:15
- Label: Cryoshell I/S
- Songwriter: Mikkel Maltha
- Producer: Jacob Hansen

Cryoshell singles chronology
"Creeping in My Soul" (2009)	"Breakout" (2012)	"Gravity Hurts" (2018)

"Breakout" is a song by Danish rock band Cryoshell, released as a stand-alone single on December 9, 2012. Written by Mikkel Maltha, the song was recorded in late 2011 and produced by Jacob Hansen. It is an alternative rock song that features elements of pop rock and symphonic pop.

The song features Danish vocalist Tine Midtgaard standing in for incumbent lead singer Christine Lorentzen while she took maternity leave. "Breakout" was essentially produced as a promotional score for the 2012 sets of the Lego toy series Hero Factory, a succession theme to Lego's Bionicle franchise that Cryoshell also produced scores for.

"Breakout" received positive reviews, with music critics labelling it "poppy and catchy" and "a brighter feel" in comparison to Cryoshell's previous work.

== Background ==
"Breakout" was written by Mikkel Maltha and recorded at Hansen Studios in Ribe, Denmark with producer Jacob Hansen in late 2011. The track features Danish singer Tine Midtgaard standing in for regular vocalist Christine Lorentzen while the latter took maternity leave from the band.

The song was essentially recorded as the promotional score for the 2012 sets of the Lego toy series Hero Factory. Its lyrics allude to elements from the theme's 2012 storyline, also titled Breakout. However, the song was only used in the closing credits of the eighth and ninth episodes of the animated TV series Hero Factory and has not featured in any other media.

Released as a digital single on December 9, 2012, "Breakout" was later announced to be included in a global reissue of Cryoshell's self-titled debut album as one of two bonus tracks (the other being a remix of the band's 2008 song "Gravity Hurts" that also features Midgaard). However, a release date was never announced and the reissue is thought to have been scrapped.

== Reception ==
"Breakout" has received positive reviews from music critics. Greek Rebels applauded the track as "diversified and dynamic with a very nice introductory melody", while Ravenheart Music described it as "poppy and very catchy".

iTunes A to Z reviewed the track as "A little lighter" and "A brighter feel" in comparison's to Cryoshell's earlier work while criticizing its production as more of a b-side track, but overall calling it "A good, solid rock track", and Midtgaard's contribution as "A serviceable job" in emulating Lorentzon's voice while seemingly stifling her own.

== Track listing ==
Digital download

- "Breakout" – 3:15

== Credits and personnel ==
Recording

- Recorded at Hansen Studios, Ribe, Denmark

Personnel

- Mikkel Maltha – Songwriting, programming, keyboards, composition
- Jacob Hansen – Production, recording, engineering, mixing
- Tine Midtgaard – Vocals
- Kasper Søderlund – Lead guitar, bass guitar, composition
- Martin Pagaard – Drums, composition

== Release history ==
Region	Date	Format	Label
Worldwide	December 9, 2012	Digital download	Cryoshell I/S
