= My Gospel =

My Gospel may refer to:

- My Gospel, a 1987 album by Etta Cameron
- "My Gospel", a song by Charlie Puth from Nine Track Mind, 2016
