= Tomas N'evergreen =

Danish-Russian singer (born 1969)

Tomas Nevergreen
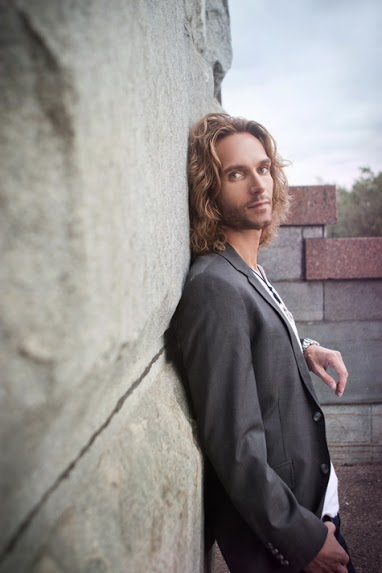
- Tomas Nevergreen

Background information
- Born: Tomas Christiansen; 12 November 1969 (age 56); Hadsten, Denmark
- Origin: Moscow, Russia
- Genres: Electropop, house
- Occupation: Singer
- Website: www.nevergreen.com

Tomas Christiansen (born 12 November 1969), better known by his stage name Tomas Nevergreen, is a Danish-Russian pop singer. The singles "Since You've Been Gone" and "Everytime (I See Your Smile)" were on top ten lists throughout Russia and Eastern Europe for more than a year and are still staples on FM radio.

His debut album Since You've Been Gone topped the charts in Russia and sold hundreds of thousands of units. The music video Since You've Been Gone was made with the participation of Russian singer Polina Griffith. He lives now in Moscow, Russia. Tomas has been married to Russian actress Valeriya Zhidkova since 24 September 2015.

In 2009 Tomas participated in the Russian national selection to the Eurovision Song Contest 2009. On 6 February 2010, he participated and won Dansk Melodi Grand Prix with Christina Chanée. They represented Denmark at the Eurovision Song Contest 2010 with the song "In a Moment Like This", placing fourth with 149 points.

In 2009, he performed at the ZD Awards. In 2019, he performed at the Rendezvous music festival in Jurmala.

== Discography ==
=== Albums ===
==== In a Moment Like This ====
(My Way Music) Release date: 21 May 2010, With Christina Chanée

- In a Moment Like This
- See You Same Time Tomorrow
- Everytime I Look Into Your Eyes
- Head Over Heels
- All You'll Ever Need
- Here Comes the Rain
- You're Not in Love
- One More Try
- Give Me Back My Heart
- How Can I Make You Love Me
- Pick Up the Phone
- Life Goes On
- Sleepless
- Making Miracles

=== Soundtracks ===
Soundtracks containing Tomas N'evergreen songs:

- Humørkortstativsælgerens søn (Edel-Mega EMR 014159-2, 2002)
- All inclusive, или Всё включено! (Paradise, 2012)
- All inclusive 2 (Paradise, 2013)
- Lyubov-morkov (Real Dakota, 2008)

=== Compilations ===
- N'evergreen appears on the compilation album Мой HiT #1.

== Videography ==
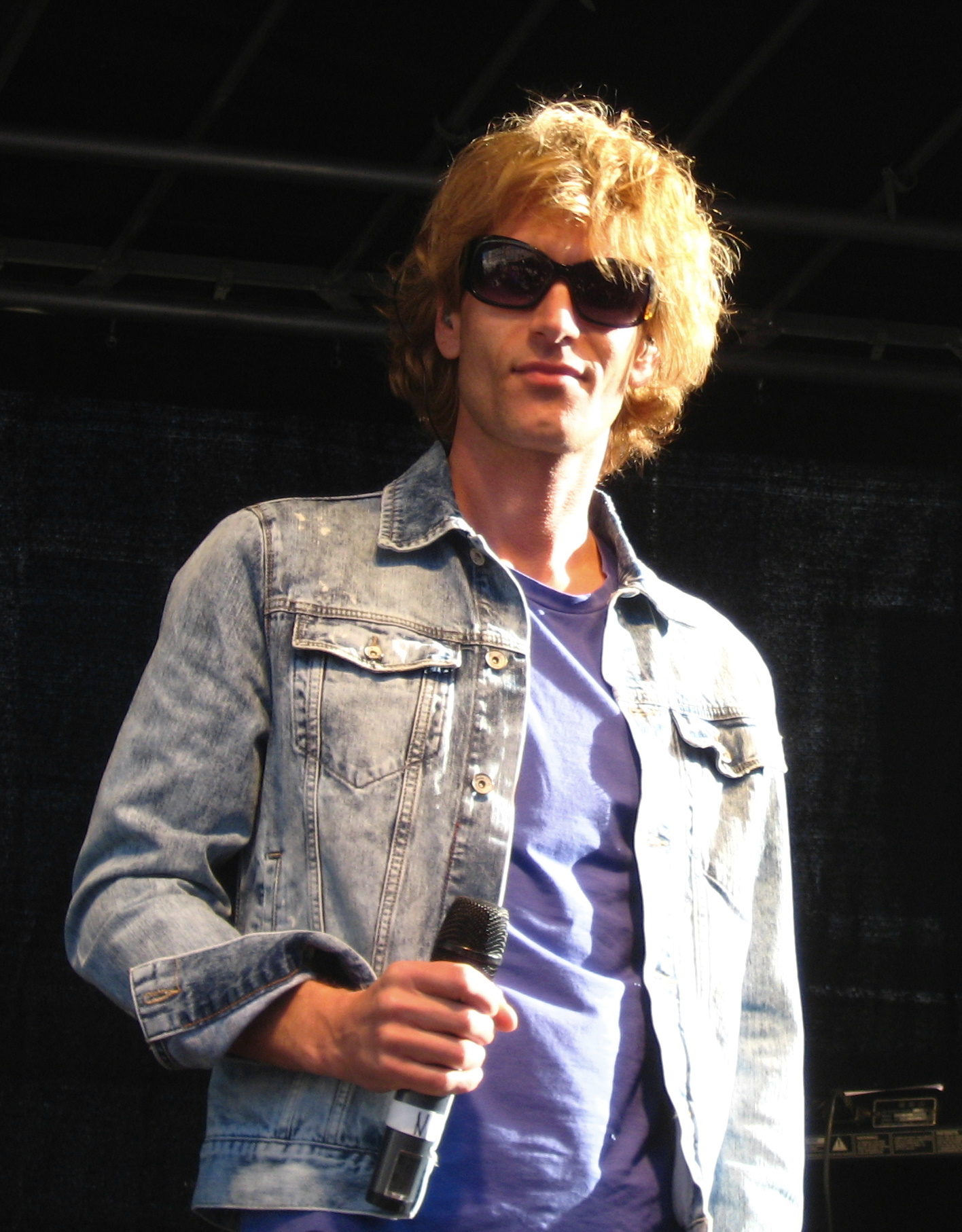
Tomas N'evergreen in Hjørring

Music videos have been made for:

- Every Time (I See Your Smile) (2000)
- Since You've Been Gone (2003)
- Just Another Love Song (2004)
- She Believes in Gold (2005)
- I Play for You (2007)
- In a Moment Like This (2010)
- Taina Bez Tain (Something About Secrets) (with Kristina Orbakaite) (2011)
- Ay Ay Ay (with Leonid Agutin) (2012)
- Falling for You (with A-Studio) (2014)
- Pick Up the Phone (2016)
- We Go Back (2021)

== Social and political activities ==
He was one of a number of celebrities who joined the PutinTeam movement before the 2018 Russian presidential election.

Preceded by Niels Brinck with "Believe Again"	Denmark in the Eurovision Song Contest (with Chanée); 2010	Succeeded by A Friend in London with "New Tomorrow"
