= Christina Chanée =

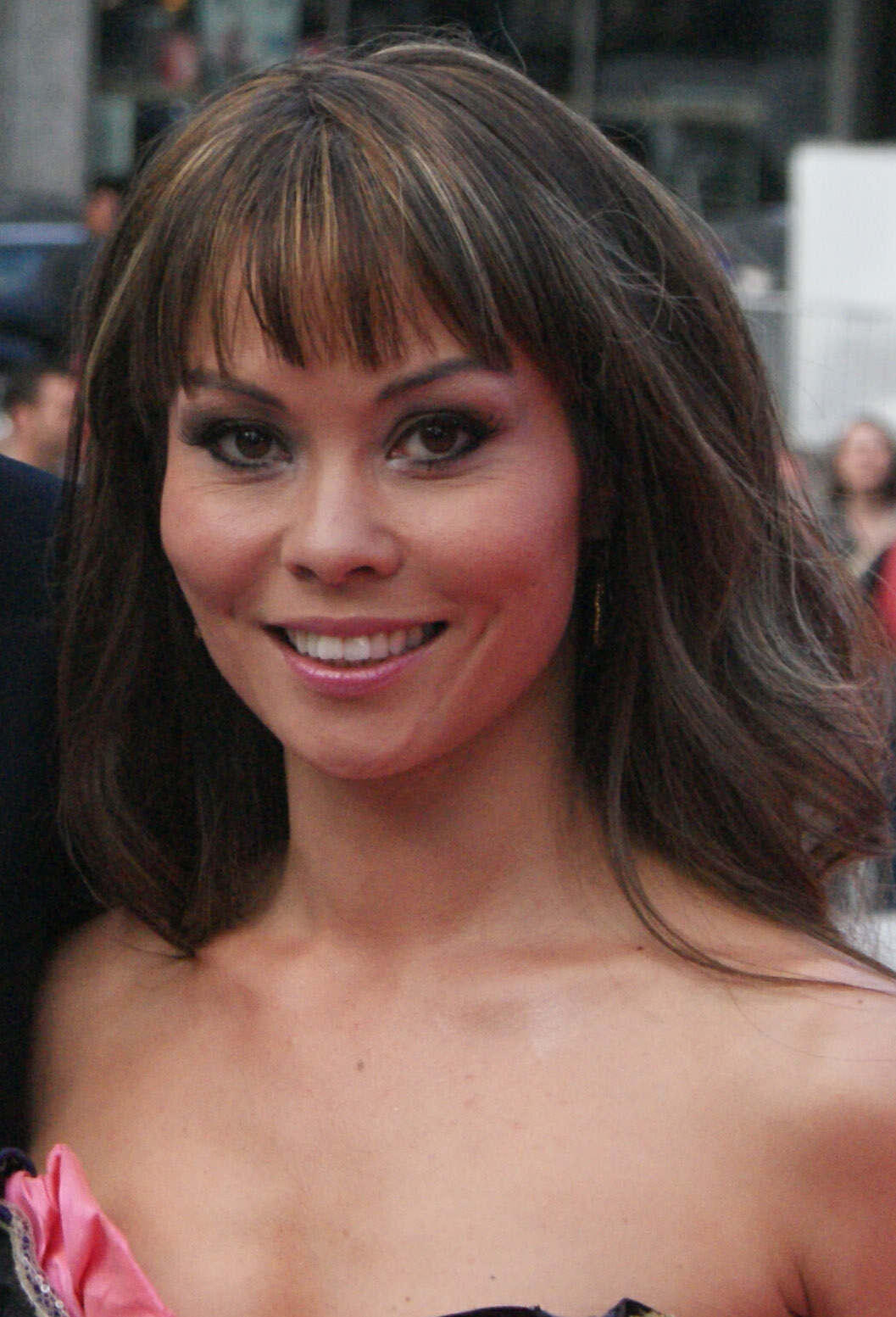
- Christina Chanée in Oslo (2010)

Background information
- Born: Christina Ratchanée Birch Wongskul; 6 January 1979 (age 47); Copenhagen, Denmark
- Occupation: Singer

Christina Chanée (born 6 January 1979, Christina Ratchanée Birch Wongskul) is a Danish-Thai pop singer who won the Dansk Melodi Grand Prix 2010 with Tomas N'evergreen, with the song "In a Moment Like This".

Chanée lives in Frederiksberg, Copenhagen with Agil Gaytaranov, a risk manager with BP whom she met while he was studying his master's degree in the Technical University of Dortmund, Germany.

Preceded by Niels Brinck with "Believe Again"	Denmark in the Eurovision Song Contest (with Tomas N'evergreen); 2010	Succeeded by A Friend In London with "New Tomorrow"
