= Gravity Hurts =

Single by Cryoshell featuring Budapest Art Orchestra
- Released: January 12, 2018
- Recorded: 2017
- Studio: Hansen Studios (Ribe, Denmark)
- Genre: Classical; symphonic pop
- Length: 4:39
- Songwriter: Mikkel Maltha
- Producer: Jacob Hansen

Cryoshell singles chronology
"Breakout" (2012)	"Gravity Hurts" (2018)	"Nature Girl" (2018)

Music video
- "Gravity Hurts" on YouTube

"Gravity Hurts" is a song by Danish rock band Cryoshell featuring the Budapest Art Orchestra, released as a stand-alone single on January 12, 2018. Written by Mikkel Maltha, the single was recorded in 2017 and produced by Jacob Hansen. It is a symphonic pop song – the second remake of "Gravity Hurts" since its original alternative rock variant was released in 2008.

Initially produced for the Lego toy series Bionicle and used in the promotional campaign of their 2008 Phantoka sets, the song was originally sung by Niels Brinck before a reproduction with fellow Danish singer Tine Midtgaard was recorded in 2011. After the release of the orchestral remix featuring incumbent lead singer Christine Lorentzen, the former versions received singular releases on December 14, 2018.

== Writing and recording ==
"Gravity Hurts" was written by Mikkel Maltha in late 2007 with the intention of being used in the marketing campaign of the Lego Bionicle Phantoka toy wave of 2008. The lyrics allude to elements from the 2008 Bionicle storyline featuring the Phantoka characters. Maltha had previously penned and been involved in the production of two other songs – "Creeping in My Soul" and "Face Me" – also used in Bionicle's marketing campaigns, and would go on to produce more for the Lego.

Recorded in late 2007, the version of "Gravity Hurts" made for Bionicle was produced by Eddie Simonsen as an alternative rock song and features Niels Brinck on vocals, Kasper Søderlund on all guitars, Maltha on keyboards and Jakob Gundel on drums. The instrumentation was later remastered at Hansen Studios in Ribe, Denmark during recording sessions in 2012.

By the time Maltha and Søderlund had established themselves as the band Cryoshell with lead singer Christine Lorentzen, a new version of "Gravity Hurts" was recorded in late 2011 at Hansen Studios with producer Jacob Hansen. The remix features fellow Danish singer Tine Midtgaard standing in for Lorentzen while she took maternity leave. Søderlund and Maltha reprise their respective guitarist and keyboardist roles while Martin Pagaard features on drums. Midgaard and Pagaard also feature in the song "Breakout" recorded around the same time. In addition to a lighter pop rock tone, a lyric in the chorus of the remix was altered from "Team up for battle we fly" to "Battle is all in your mind". While not confirmed, the change is thought to be a way of distancing the song from the Bionicle franchise, as the former lyric refers to the Phantoka characters from the line.

A third version, again produced by Hansen, was recorded in 2017 with Lorentzen. As opposed to previous versions of "Gravity Hurts" which are alternative rock songs, this remix was produced as a classical symphonic piece and features orchestral arrangements from the Budapest Art Orchestra conducted by Peter Due.

== Artwork ==
A proposed cover for the release of the Tine Midgaard mix of "Gravity Hurts" was designed by Christian Faber, the concept artist responsible for all imagery concerning Cryoshell, in 2012. However, since the remix wasn't released as a single until 2018, the design was never officially used.

The single cover art for the classical version of "Gravity Hurts" was also designed by Faber. It features the Cryoshell logo carved onto a violin as part of its right F-hole with the song title and band name placed beneath. The design also features a golden spiral template that's center lines up with the 'O' of Cryoshell.

For the versions featuring Brinck and Midgaard, Cryoshell ran a competition between October 25 – November 15, 2018, asking fans to create the official cover art for the singular releases of the two mixes and post them with the hashtag #GravityHurtsArt via social media. The winning designs were announced on November 28, 2018.

== Release and media usage ==
As intended, the original version of "Gravity Hurts" was used as the primary musical score in the marketing campaign of the Lego Bionicle Phantoka toy wave of 2008; featuring in commercials, animated shorts and online games promoting the sets and characters. The song also featured in several retrospective videos looking back at the first eight years of the Bionicle franchise. It was released as a free MP3 download from the official Bionicle website on February 8, 2008 before being remastered and receiving an official single release on December 14, 2018. The song also featured on the Spotify Rock Hard playlist of December 2018, while the instrumentation was posted earlier onto Cryoshell's official YouTube channel on February 26, 2015.

The mix featuring Tine Midtgaard premiered on Cryoshell's official YouTube channel on January 8, 2013. It was later announced that the remix to be included in a global reissue of Cryoshell's self-titled debut album as one of two bonus tracks (the other being "Breakout" which also features Midgaard). However, a release date has not been confirmed and the reissue is thought to have been scrapped. The track eventually received an official single release on December 14, 2018.

The classical version with Christine Lorentzen featuring the Budapest Art Orchestra was released on January 12, 2018, as a stand-alone single.

== Music video ==
=== Original version ===
The music video for the original version of "Gravity Hurts" was shot in a recording studio in Denmark in early 2008 and premiered on the official Bionicle website on March 7, 2008. It focuses on vocalist Niels Brinck recording the song in the studio with guitarist Kasper Søderlund and features clips from various animated Bionicle shorts released between 2001 and 2008.

=== Classical version ===
A music video for the classical version was shot during its recording in Budapest and edited by Sune Daugaard. It premiered on June 6, 2018. The video features lead vocalist Christine Lorentzen singing in a recording booth while the Budapest Art Orchestra record their part in another studio.

== Track listing ==
Free MP3 download (featuring Brinck)

- "Gravity Hurts" – 4:23

Digital download (classical version)

- "Gravity Hurts" (featuring Christine & Budapest Art Orchestra) – 4:39

Digital download

- "Gravity Hurts" (feat. Brinck) – 4:31

Digital download

- "Gravity Hurts" (feat. Tine Midtgaard) – 4:06

== Credits and personnel ==
Recording

- Recorded, mastered and mixed at Hansen Studios, Ribe, Denmark

Personnel

- Mikkel Maltha – Songwriting, programming, keyboards, composition
- Eddie Simonsen – Production, recording, engineering, mixing (original version)
- Jacob Hansen – Production, recording, engineering, mixing (re-recorded and classical versions)
- Niels Brinck – Vocals (original version)
- Kasper Søderlund – Lead guitar, bass guitar, composition
- Jakob Gundel – Drums (original version)
- Tine Midgaard – Vocals (re-recorded version)
- Martin Pagaard – Drums (re-recorded version)
- Christine Lorentzen – Vocals (classical version)
- Peter Due, Budapest Art Orchestra – Orchestral arrangements, composition (classical version)

== Release history ==
Region	Date	Format	Version	Label
Worldwide	February 8, 2008	Free MP3 download	Featuring Brinck	Cryoshell I/S
Worldwide	January 12, 2018	Digital download	Classical	Self-released
Worldwide	December 14, 2018	Digital download	Featuring Brinck	Self-released
Worldwide	December 14, 2018	Digital download	With Tine Midgaard	Self-released
