= Etta Cameron =

Bahamian–Danish singer (1939–2010)

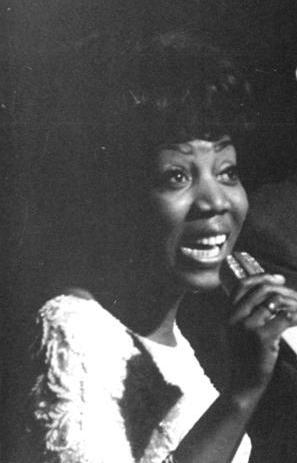
- Etta Cameron, 1970

Background information
- Born: Ettamae Louvita Coakley; 21 November 1939; Nassau, Bahamas
- Died: 4 March 2010 (aged 70) Aarhus, Denmark
- Genres: Jazz, gospel
- Occupation: Singer
- Years active: 1970s–2009

Etta Cameron (born Ettamae Louvita Coakley; 21 November 1939 – 4 March 2010) was a Bahamian–Danish singer. She especially sang jazz and gospel, and left her mark in the Danish music culture through her entire career from her arrival in Denmark in the 1970s. She was made a Knight of Dannebrog in 1997.

Cameron was also well known as one of the judges in the first two seasons of Scenen er din, the Danish version of the American TV show Star Search.

== Life and career ==
Cameron was born in Nassau, Bahamas to Bahamian parents.

From 1967 till 1972, she lived in East Berlin which she used as a base for getting performance commitments in Eastern and Western Europe. Popular claims that she had lost her passport and was forced to stay in East Germany for five years have been proven wrong.

In 1972, Cameron moved to Denmark.

Cameron recorded the Ralph Siegel, Fred Jay song "You Gotta Move". Backed with "Wish You Were Here", written by Ralph Siegel and Christian Dornaus, it was released in Germany in 1977 on Barclay 36.016.

== Personal life ==
Her daughter Debbie Cameron, born in Miami, Florida, in 1958, also moved to Denmark in 1978, where she, too, established a musical career, not least representing Denmark twice in the Eurovision Song Contest, in 1979 and 1981 along with Tommy Seebach.

== Death ==
Etta Cameron died on 4 March 2010 in Aarhus, Denmark, after a long illness.

== Solo discography ==
The following albums have been published by Etta Cameron:

- Come together with Etta (1975)
- I'm a Woman (1976)
- Mayday (1980)
- Easy (1981)
- My Gospel (1987)
- A Gospel Concert with Etta Cameron (1995)
- Lovesongs (1995)
- Etta Cameron mit NDR Big Band (1996)
- Certainly Lord (1996)
- My Christmas (1996)
- 'Etta Cameron Ole Kock Hansen and Tuxedo Big Band (1998)
- A Gospel Concert with Etta Cameron vol. 2 (1996)
- I Have a Dream (2000)
- Lady Be Good (2003)
- Her vil ties, her vil bies (2005)
- Spirituals (2008)
- Etta (2009)

== Filmography ==
- Mit mir nich, Madam (1969)
- Peter von Scholten (1987)
- Mimi og madammerne (1998)

== Literature ==
- Hun gav smerten vinger (English: She Gave the Pain Wings) (2007)
