= Unite (A Friend in London album) =

Studio album by A Friend in London
- Released: 21 January 2013
- Recorded: 2011–2012
- Genre: Indie pop
- Label: ArtPeople

Singles from Unite
- 1. "New Tomorrow" Released: 25 February 2011; 2. "Calling a Friend" Released: 30 April 2012; 3. "Get Rich in Vegas" Released: 23 July 2012

Unite is the debut album of the Danish indie pop band A Friend in London. It was released on 21 January 2013 on ArtPeople record label and includes "New Tomorrow", their Danish Eurovision Song Contest 2011 entry that finished fifth in that year's competition. The album also includes a collaboration with Carly Rae Jepsen, who is featured in the track "Rest from the Streets".

== Singles ==
- "New Tomorrow" was released as the lead single from the album on 25 February 2011. It represented Denmark in the Eurovision Song Contest 2011, held in Düsseldorf, Germany.
- "Calling a Friend" was released as the second single from the album on 30 April 2012.
- "Get Rich in Vegas" was released as the third single from the album on 23 July 2012.
- "The Light" was released from the album on 7 February 2011.

== Track listing ==
No.	Title	Length
1.	"The Light"	4:12
2.	"Get Rich in Vegas"	3:49
3.	"Hide"	4:16
4.	"Are You Lost"	3:40
5.	"New Tomorrow"	3:03
6.	"Rocket"	3:47
7.	"Unite Unite"	3:26
8.	"Out of My Hands"	5:33
9.	"Rest from the Streets" (feat. Carly Rae Jepsen)	3:58
10.	"Tweeting with the Birds"	3:14
11.	"Calling a Friend"	3:18
12.	"Stage Dive"	3:55
13.	"Time Took My Words"	3:26

iTunes Deluxe Version
No.	Title	Length
14.	"New Tomorrow" (feat. Howie D)
15.	"New Tomorrow" (Acoustic Version)
16.	"Get Rich in Vegas" (Acoustic Version)
17.	"Calling a Friend" (DJ Anders K and DJ Jay Adams Remix)
18.	"It's Odd"

== Chart performance ==
Chart (2013)	Peak position
Danish Albums (Hitlisten)	14

== Release history ==
Region	Date	Format	Label
Denmark	21 January 2013	Digital download	ArtPeople
