= Rediscovered (Andreas Johnson album) =

Studio album by Andreas Johnson
- Released: 29 October 2008
- Recorded: Bohus Sound Recording, Kungälv, Sweden
- Genre: jazz, pop rock
- Length: 41 minutes
- Label: Warner Music Sweden

Andreas Johnson chronology
The Collector (2007)	Rediscovered (2008)	Tour Edition (2010)

Rediscovered is an Andreas Johnson studio album, released on 29 October 2008.

== Track listing ==
1. It Don't Mean a Thing
2. Route 66
3. Do You Wanna Dance
4. Smile
5. Glorious
6. Night And Day
7. Can't Take My Eyes Off You
8. Night Stood Still
9. Waterloo
10. Sign Your Name
11. The Girl I Love

== Contributors ==
- Andreas Johnson - vocals
- Anders Kjellberg - drums
- Kaspar Vadsholt - bass
- Magnus Persson - percussion
- Georg Wadenius - guitar
- Marcoss Ubeda - piano

== Chart positions ==
Chart (2008)	Peak position
Sweden	29
