= Skjulte stjerner =

Danish television series

Skjulte stjerner (Hidden Star in Danish) is a Danish television variety program, hosted by Felix Smith. The program that seeks to find new singing talent, but unlike other similar music talent competition, the program doesn't have any judging panel. Votes are done by SMS and comments received online. The program premiered on 2 September 2011 and the final was held on 14 October 2011.

The program introduces 8 known singing stars who each presents his choice of a "hidden star" through personal contacts and through friends. In the live shows, the stars have to sing as a duo with the "hidden star" they have chosen and agreed to mentor for success. Following the performance comments and votes are received and contesting duos (a star and his/her protégé) are eliminated.

The winner of the series was Thomas Meilstrup mentored by and in duo with Tim Schou, lead vocalist of the Danish band A Friend in London.

== Results (2011) ==
– Winner
– Runner-up
– Received enough SMS votes to proceed
– In danger, but saved. Except in the first live show, when there was a new vote, but where receivers of 2nd and 3rd fewest SMS votes eliminated
– In danger and later voted out
– Previously voted out, and therefore does not qualify
– Received fewest SMS votes and therefore eliminated

Star (mentor)	Hidden Star	Week 1 (9 Sept)	Week 2 (16 Sept)	Week 3 (23 Sept)	Week 4 (30 Sept)	Semi Final (7 Oct 2011)	Final (14 Oct 2011)		Position
Tim Schou	Thomas Meilstrup	"Firework"	"(I've Had) The Time of My Life" / "Baby"	"New Tomorrow / "Calling a Friend"	"Over the Rainbow"	"Listen" / "Dancing on My Own"	"Moves Like Jagger" / "Run to You"	"Over the Rainbow"	1
Karen	Mie	"Empire State of Mind"	"Dancing in the Street"	"Lås og slå"	"Use Somebody"	"Bleeding Love" / "Purple Rain"	"Det burde ikke være sådan her" / "Rolling in the Deep"	"Empire State of Mind"	2
U$O	Emily	"Beggin'"	"The Way I Are"	"Hey Shorty" / "Dans som Michael Jackson"	"Indestructible"	"Set Fire to the Rain" / "I Need a Dollar & "Money Money Money"	"Lidt i fem" & "Momentet" / "Telephone"		3
Magnus Vigilius	Nanna	"Save Yor Love"	Elephant Love Medley	"You Raise Me Up"	"Baby I'm a Fool"	"As" / "Fly Me to the Moon"			4
Anders Blichfeldt	Kirstine	"I Love Rock 'n' Roll"	"Baby When You're Gone"	"No Peace Like in Heaven"	"Uden dig"				5
Clara Sofie	Christoffer	"Save the World"	"Broken Strings"	"Lever for dig" / "Tiden går baglæns"					6
Johnny Reimar	Methe	"Slow Boat to China"	"Jackson"						7
Marie Frank	Jonas Hansen	"When Tomorrow Comes"							8
