= Niels Brinck =

Danish musician

Niels Brinck Kristensen
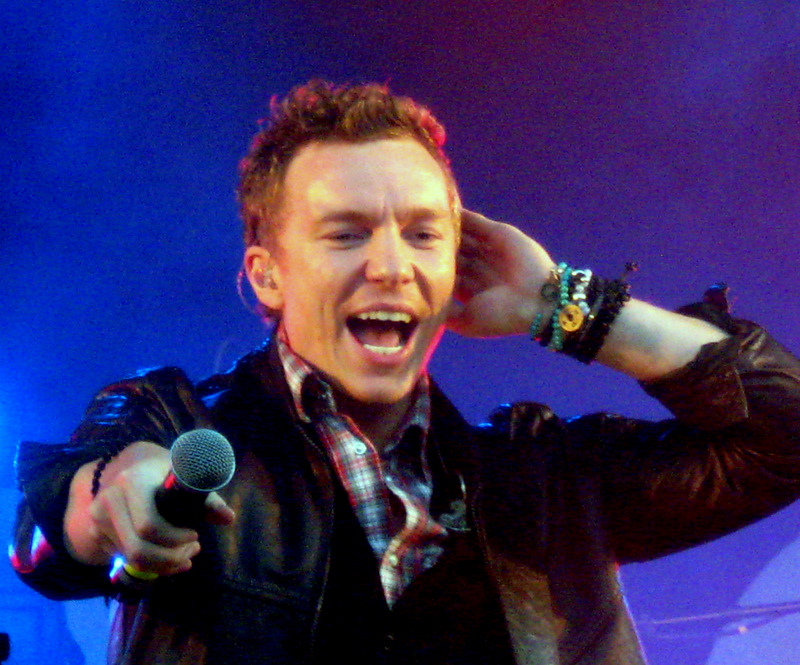
- Brinck in 2009

Background information
- Born: Niels Brinck Kristensen; 24 September 1974 (age 51)
- Origin: Aabyhøj, Denmark
- Occupations: Singer, songwriter
- Instruments: Vocals, guitar

Niels Brinck Kristensen (born 24 September 1974) is a Danish singer and songwriter.

Brinck won the Dansk Melodi Grand Prix 2009 with the song "Believe Again" which was written by Lars Halvor Jensen, Martin Larsson Moller and Ronan Keating. Brinck, representing Denmark, finished 13th in the finals of the Eurovision Song Contest 2009 in Moscow, Russia, on 16 May 2009.

Brinck is an English-language singer-songwriter from Denmark who made his solo album debut in 2008. Born Niels Kristensen in 1974 in Aabyhøj, a suburb of Aarhus, Denmark, he enjoyed a year of breakout success in 2008, not only as a solo artist but also as a songwriter for others. His solo album debut, Brinck, was a Top Ten hit on the Danish albums chart. Released on Copenhagen Records, the self-titled album includes the Top 20 hit single "I Don't Wanna Love Her" as well as the Top 40 hit single "In the End I Started," a duet with Swedish singer Maria Marcus that was the theme song for the second season of the internationally popular television crime series Anna Pihl. Also in 2008 Brinck was credited with writing "The 1," a chart-topping smash hit for pop singer Martin, a 15-year-old national sensation who won the inaugural season of the Danish version of the internationally popular television show The X Factor. In 2008, he helped performed the songs "Face Me" and "Gravity Hurts" as a part of Cryoshell for the Bionicle franchise.

His second album was released in 2013. with "The Heights" as the first single.

Preceded by Simon Mathew with All Night Long	Denmark in the Eurovision Song Contest; 2009	Succeeded by Chanée and N'evergreen with In a Moment Like This
