= Creeping in My Soul =

EP by Cryoshell
- Released: January 5, 2010
- Recorded: 2008–2009
- Studio: Hansen Studios (Ribe, Denmark)
- Genre: Alternative rock; hard rock
- Length: 21:02
- Label: Cryoshell I/S
- Producer: Jacob Hansen

Cryoshell chronology
Creeping in My Soul (2010)	Cryoshell (2010)

Creeping in My Soul is an extended play by Danish rock band Cryoshell released on January 5, 2010. Produced by Jacob Hansen, it was recorded between late 2008 and 2009 at Hansen Studios in Ribe, Denmark.

The EP serves as a teaser to Cryoshell's self-titled debut album, with all five songs going on to feature on it.

== Background ==
The release of Cryoshell's debut album had been pushed back numerous times due to ongoing studio sessions. As a teaser for it, the band put together five songs that they had already completed and released it as an EP on January 5, 2010, titling it Creeping in My Soul, after the opening track.

The songs "Creeping in My Soul" and "Closer to the Truth (Take Me Home)" are re-recordings; their original mixes featured in marketing campaigns for the Lego toy series Bionicle between 2007–08. Additionally, a shortened, lyric-tweaked version of "Bye Bye Babylon" was used by the toy line in 2009.

== Track listing ==
No.	Title	Writer(s)	Length
1.	"Creeping in My Soul"	Mikkel Maltha; Anthony Lledo	3:59
2.	"Bye Bye Babylon"	Maltha; Kasper Søderlund; Christine Lorentzen	4:37
3.	"Falling"	Søderlund; Lorentzen	4:26
4.	"Closer to the Truth (Take Me Home)"	Maltha	4:02
5.	"Murky"	Maltha; Søderlund	3:56
Total length:			21:02

Notes

- "Bye Bye Babylon" is shortened on its single release.

== Personnel ==
Band

- Christine Lorentzen – Lead vocals
- Kasper Søderlund – Guitars, bass guitar, additional keys
- Mikkel Maltha – Piano, keyboard, orchestral arrangements, additional vocals (track 1)
- Jakob Gundel – Drums

Production

- Produced, engineered, mixed and mastered by Jacob Hansen and Cryoshell
- Recorded at Hansen Studios in Ribe, Denmark
- Photography and artwork: Christian Faber
