= Cryoshell =

Danish rock band

- Cryoshell's logo used in promotional material.

Background information
- Origin: Copenhagen, Denmark
- Genres: Alternative rock; hard rock; symphonic rock
- Years active: 2006–present
- Labels: Cryoshell I/S; VME
- Members: Mikkel Maltha; Kasper Søderlund; Christine Lorentzen
- Past members: Jakob Gundel; Tine Midtgaard; Martin Pagaard

Cryoshell (often stylized as C R Y O S H E L L) is a Danish rock band from Copenhagen formed in 2006. The line-up consists of keyboardist Mikkel Maltha, guitarist Kasper Søderlund and lead vocalist Christine Lorentzen.

In the band's early years, they produced several songs that featured in promotional material for the Lego toy series Bionicle. In the wake of the toy line's 2010 discontinuation, they released their self-titled debut album. A sophomore effort, Next to Machines, is currently in production.

Cryoshell's musical style has been classified as alternative rock, hard rock and metal, and labelled similar to other female-fronted bands such as Delain, Evanescence, Within Temptation and Lacuna Coil.

== History ==
=== 2006–2008: Formation and early work ===
The group that would later be called Cryoshell was first formed in Copenhagen, Denmark in late 2006. Music composer Mikkel Maltha was commissioned by the Lego Group to produce a song that would be used in the campaign of a forthcoming line of Lego toys. Maltha wrote "Creeping in My Soul" with fellow composer Anthony Lledo and produced the track with Eddie Simonsen and musician Kasper Søderlund. Vocals were provided by Christine Lorentzen – a former TV presenter and employee of the creative agency Advance – after she auditioned for the part.

"Creeping in My Soul" featured in commercials, online games and other media advertising Lego's Bionicle Barraki wave in 2007. When the song was released as a free MP3 download, it became the number-one most downloaded file from the official Lego website, and reached over one million views across various videos featuring the song on YouTube. Riding on this success, Maltha, Søderlund and Simonsen went on to produce the tracks "Face Me" and "Gravity Hurts" with established Danish singer Niels Brinck for the campaigns of Bionicle's 2007 Mahri and 2008 Phantoka waves, respectively.

Lorentzen rejoined Maltha and Søderlund to record "Closer to the Truth" for Bionicle's Mistika wave in 2008. The song served as the group's first official release under the band name Cryoshell. Plans to record a full-length album for a late 2008 release were announced, but production kept being pushed back.

=== 2009–2014: Cryoshell ===
Cryoshell spent the majority of 2009 recording their self-titled debut album with producer Jacob Hansen. The lead single "Bye Bye Babylon" was released in July 2009, simultaneously serving as the band's fifth and final song for Bionicle, this time for their Glatorian and Glatorian Legends waves. A re-recorded version of "Creeping in My Soul" was released as the second single in November, followed by an EP bearing the same name in January 2010. The album Cryoshell was released June 7, 2010 solely in Scandinavia due to difficulties in securing an international distribution, but slowly became available overseas over the next two years.

Lorentzen took maternity leave from the band between November 2011 and October 2013. In her place, Tine Midtgaard, a runner-up on the Danish incarnation of the talent show The X Factor, provided vocals for two new recordings – "Breakout" and a remix of "Gravity Hurts" – the former of which received a single release in December 2012. When Lorentzen rejoined, it was stated that both songs would be included as bonus tracks on an international reissue of Cryoshell's debut album under Greek record label The Leaders. However, a release date was never announced and the plans are thought to have been scrapped.

=== 2015–Present: Next to Machines ===
In February 2015, concept artist Christian Faber confirmed that Cryoshell would produce the soundtrack for Rebel Nature, a multimedia project that he is currently developing. Recording began the following September for a mobile app game called Escape RIG21. Songs inspired by Rebel Nature will make up Cryoshell's second studio album, Next to Machines. Production was originally set to be crowdfunded through Kickstarter, but the band managed to secure their own finance prior to the campaign's May 2017 launch. Five singles were released ahead of the album – "Nature Girl" (a cover of "Nature Boy" by Nat King Cole), "Don't Look Down" and "Slipping" in 2018, "Dive" in 2020, and "Faux" in 2021.

Additionally, an orchestral remix of "Gravity Hurts" featuring Lorentzen and the Budapest Art Orchestra was released in January 2018, followed by singular releases of the mixes featuring Brinck and Midgaard in December 2018. A classical version of "Creeping in My Soul" was also released in 2019, while the band collaborated with the synth-rock musician Essenger on the track "As Above, So Below", which was released in 2023 in celebration of "Bionicle Day" (stylized as "810NICLE Day").

== Band members ==
=== Current ===
- Mikkel Maltha – keyboards, piano (2006–present)
- Kasper Søderlund – guitars, bass (2006–present)
- Christine Lorentzen – vocals (2006–07, 2008–11, 2013–present)

=== Former ===
- Jakob Gundel – drums (2009–11)
- Tine Midtgaard – vocals (2011–13)
- Martin Pagaard – drums (2011–13)

== Discography ==
Cryoshell discography
- Studio albums: 1
- Extended plays: 1
- Singles: 13
- Music videos: 6

Cryoshell have released 1 studio album, 1 extended play, 13 singles and 6 music videos.

=== Studio albums ===
Album details
Cryoshell
- Released: June 7, 2010
- Label: Cryoshell I/S, VME
- Formats: CD, digital download

=== Extended plays ===
Extended play details
Creeping in My Soul
- Released: January 5, 2010
- Label: Cryoshell I/S
- Formats: Digital download

=== Singles ===
Year	Song	Album
2009	"Bye Bye Babylon"	Cryoshell
2009	"Creeping in My Soul"	Cryoshell
2012	"Breakout"	—N/a
2018	"Gravity Hurts" (featuring Budapest Art Orchestra)	—N/a
2018	"Nature Girl"	Next to Machines
2018	"Don't Look Down"	Next to Machines
2018	"Slipping"	Next to Machines
2018	"Gravity Hurts" (featuring Brinck)	—N/a
2018	"Gravity Hurts" (with Tine Midgaard)	—N/a
2019	"Creeping in My Soul" (featuring Budapest Art Orchestra)	—N/a
2020	"Dive"	Next to Machines
2021	"Faux"	Next to Machines
2023	"As Above, So Below" (with Essenger)	—N/a

=== Music videos ===
Year	Song	Director
2008	"Gravity Hurts" (featuring Brinck)	Unknown
2008	"Closer to the Truth"	Unknown
2009	"Bye Bye Babylon"	Josh Nussbaum
2009	"Bye Bye Babylon" (Bionicle version)	Josh Nussbaum
2010	"Creeping in My Soul"	Peter Hjort
2018	"Gravity Hurts" (featuring Budapest Art Orchestra)	Sune Daugaard
