= Bionicle: The Legend Reborn =

- Directed by: Mark Baldo
- Written by: Sean Catherine Derek
- Story by: Greg Farshtey
- Produced by: Kristy Scanlan; Joshua Wexler
- Starring: Michael Dorn; Jim Cummings; Marla Sokoloff; David Leisure; Mark Famiglietti; James Arnold Taylor; Armin Shimerman; Fred Tatasciore
- Edited by: Aeolyn Kelley
- Music by: Cory Lerios & John D'Andrea
- Production companies: Tinseltown Toons; Threshold Animation Studios; The Lego Group
- Distributed by: Universal Studios Home Entertainment
- Release date: September 15, 2009
- Running time: 71 minutes
- Countries: Denmark; United States
- Language: English
- Box office: $4,883

Bionicle: The Legend Reborn is a 2009 animated science fantasy action film based on the Bionicle toy line by Lego. It is the fourth and final Bionicle film to be released. Distributed by Universal Studios Home Entertainment, the film is a stand-alone sequel to the trilogy of films released by Buena Vista Home Entertainment under the Miramax Home Entertainment label. It follows the toy line's 2009 story and features a different set of characters than that of the first three films. The Legend Reborn was released on September 15, 2009, in the United States and Canada, October 5 in the United Kingdom, and September 2 in Australia. The film stars Michael Dorn as the voice of Mata Nui.

The Legend Reborn was intended to be the start of a trilogy of films, but production on the sequels was cancelled due to Lego discontinuing the release of Bionicle toys in 2010. The story was concluded through other media outlets, including comic books and a web story titled the "Mata Nui Saga".

== Plot ==
Mata Nui, the Great Spirit of the Matoran universe, is exiled from his home by his brother, Makuta Teridax. Teridax takes over Mata Nui's gigantic robot body, while Mata Nui's spirit is transferred into the Mask of Life, which crash lands on the wasteland planet of Bara Magna. Mata Nui creates a new body and befriends a Scarabax beetle named Click, and is attacked by a member of the Bone Hunter tribe. He meets an Agori named Metus, who warns him of dangerous tribes.

Metus takes Mata Nui to the village of Vulcanus, where gladiatorial fights settle disputes between villages. Mata Nui intervenes in a fight and befriends the Glatorian fighter Ackar. While travelling to the village Tajun, Mata Nui, Ackar, and a Glatorian named Kiina are ambushed by enemy Bone Hunters and Skrall, who have formed an alliance and destroyed Tajun. The group considers the possibility of a traitor due to the unintelligent Bone Hunters and Skrall being able to enact smarter attacks. They rescue an injured Glatorian named Gresh and discover evidence of Mata Nui's connection to Bara Magna. Kiina takes the others to a cavern to repair Gresh's injuries, where they discover an Agori named Berix also inside, who joins their team.

Mata Nui repairs and transforms the Glatorians' weapons using his mask's power. They travel to the village of Tesara and unite the villages against the Skrall-Bone Hunter alliance. Kiina suspects Berix of being the traitor but the two are captured by the real defector, Metus. Mata Nui confronts the Skrall leader Tuma, defeats him, and frees Kiina and Berix. They join forces with Ackar and Gresh to battle the Skrall and Bone Hunters. When Metus attempts escape after the Bone Hunters and Skrall are defeated, Mata Nui uses his mask's power to turn Metus into a snake: an indicator of the latter's true nature.

The combined efforts of the Agori, Glatorians, and Scarabax beetles unite the villages and rebuild a large robotic body. Mata Nui discovers a map on a Skrall shield and prepares for new adventure, while the Glatorian promise to help him retake his home from Teridax.

== Cast ==
- Michael Dorn as Mata Nui
- Jim Cummings as Ackar
- Marla Sokoloff as Kiina
- James Arnold Taylor as Berix & Vastus
- Mark Famiglietti as Gresh
- David Leisure as Metus
- Armin Shimerman as Raanu
- Fred Tatasciore as Tuma
- Jeff Bennett as Strakk & Tarix
- Dee Bradley Baker as Bone Hunters, Skrall & Vorox
- Mark Baldo as Villagers

== Production ==
Unlike the first three films, The Legend Reborn was produced by Threshold Animation Studios and distributed by Universal Studios Home Entertainment, while the original trilogy was produced by Creative Capers Entertainment and distributed by Buena Vista Home Entertainment under the Miramax Home Entertainment label.

After reading the script the director, Mark Baldo thought of casting Michael Dorn of Star Trek for the voice of Mata Nui.

Click, Mata Nui's pet beetle, was intended to have a much smaller role the film: as written in the script, after the Mask of Life turns Click into an inanimate shield, he was intended to remain as such for the remainder of the film, presumably acting as a prop rather than a character. Mark Baldo proposed the idea that Click could turn back into a beetle at will, serving as a companion for Mata Nui. Greg Farshtey ultimately approved the idea, on account of finding it cute.

The film was to be the beginning of a new Bionicle trilogy, and the writers were working on a draft for a sequel, but The Lego Group cancelled the toyline and, hence, the films, forcing the storyline to be concluded via other forms of media. One of these projects, an illustrated blog called "Mata Nui Saga", would bring back Michael Dorn as Mata Nui to narrate it.

== Music ==
There are two licensed songs used in the ending credits of the film:

- "Ride" - Presence
- "Bye Bye Babylon" - Cryoshell
