= Creeping in My Soul (song) =

Single by Cryoshell

from the album Cryoshell
- Released: November 29, 2009
- Recorded: 2009
- Studio: Hansen Studios (Ribe, Denmark)
- Genre: Alternative rock; neoclassical metal; nu metal; symphonic rock
- Length: 3:59
- Label: Cryoshell I/S
- Songwriter(s): Mikkel Maltha; Anthony Lledo
- Producer(s): Jacob Hansen

Cryoshell singles chronology
"Bye Bye Babylon" (2009)	"Creeping in My Soul" (2009)	"Breakout" (2012)

Music video
- "Creeping in My Soul" on YouTube

"Creeping in My Soul" is a song by Danish rock band Cryoshell, released as the second single from their self-titled debut studio album on November 29, 2009. Written by Mikkel Maltha and Anthony Lledo, the song was recorded in 2009 and produced by Jacob Hansen. It is an alternative and symphonic rock song that encompasses neoclassical metal and nu metal elements.

Prior to the official formation of the band, an earlier version of "Creeping in My Soul" was produced for the Lego toy series Bionicle and featured in the promotional campaign of their Barraki sets of 2007. Upon its release, it proved popular with Bionicle's fan base and prompt the group to produce further songs for subsequent Bionicle toy waves up until its 2010 discontinuation. A classical version featuring the Budapest Art Orchestra was released in 2019.

The song has received positive reviews from music critics, many of which applaud lead singer Christine Lorentzen's vocalistic style and compared it to the sound of American rock band Evanescence.

== Background and recording ==
"Creeping in My Soul" was written by Mikkel Maltha and Anthony Lledo prior to the official formation of Cryoshell. It was produced with Eddie Simonsen and guitarist Kasper Søderlund in late 2006 after Maltha was contacted by the Lego Group to compose a song for the marketing campaign of an upcoming Lego toy wave. The three scouted for a potential vocalist and sent five singers to the Lego Group's American headquarters to audition. Ultimately, the company chose Christine Lorentzen, a then-employee of the creative Danish agency Advance, to sing.

In 2009, "Creeping in My Soul" was re-recorded with producer Jacob Hansen at Hansen Studios in Ribe, Denmark for Cryoshell's debut studio album. A classical remix, again produced by Hansen and featuring the Budapest Art Orchestra conducted by Peter Hue, was recorded in 2018.

== Release and media usage ==
As intended, the original version of "Creeping in My Soul" was used as the primary musical score in the marketing campaign of the Lego Bionicle Barraki toy wave of 2007 and was featured in commercials, animated shorts and online games promoting the sets and characters. The song itself was released as a free MP3 download on the official Bionicle website on March 13, 2007 and at the time of release, became the number-one most downloaded file from the Lego website and reached over one million views on various YouTube videos incorporating the song. This success led to Maltha and Søderlund producing more songs for subsequent Lego toy waves, and ultimately, Cryoshell's formation.

The re-recorded version of "Creeping in My Soul" was released on November 29, 2009, as the second single from the band's debut album. It also features on the EP of the same name. The remix briefly featured on the music chart show Boogie Mix on Danish music channel Boogie TV in May 2010 in a top-20 playlist showcasing up-and-coming talent. "Creeping in My Soul" made positions No. 16 and No. 17 before dropping out a few weeks later. "Creeping in My Soul" has also received airplay on alternative rock radio stations across Denmark and North America.

The classical version was released on December 26, 2019, over a decade after the re-recorded version's release.

== Reception ==
"Creeping in My Soul" received positive reviews from music critics. Sputnikmusic highlights the song as "hard rock reminiscent of Evanescence and a bit of Linkin Park" that starts off Cryoshell's debut album "on a high note".

== Music video ==
The music video for the re-recorded version of the song was directed by Peter Hjort and shot at a country house in rural Denmark on December 9, 2009. Its theme is loosely based on the 2001 thriller film The Others. It premiered on Cryoshell's official YouTube channel on April 19, 2010.

=== Synopsis ===
The video opens to a shot of a rural mansion, followed by lead singer Christine Lorentzen in a white dress lying on a four-poster bed in a bedroom inside. She sings the first verse in a black room, while hands playing a piano are shown and become a recurring montage. As Lorentzen sings the first chorus, a little girl in a white skirt stands in the grass outside the house. Lorentzen then walks through a hallway with projections of her and guitarist Kasper Søderlund performing on the wall. The projections (later featuring drummer Jakob Gundel) become a recurring feature throughout the video on different features in the house.

Prior to the second verse, Lorentzen walks down a staircase, while keyboardist Mikkel Maltha is shown laying in a pool of gel scattered with leaves as he raps part of the verse. Lorentzen looks out of a window to see the girl running in the grass. The next scene features a mirror reflection of her singing back to herself, with a second mirror showing an alternative reflection of her watching on. In the dining and TV rooms, the girl interacts with mannequin dolls as if they were real people.

Maltha raps the bridge of the song as his head emerges from the gel. The last chorus sees Lorentzen running through a hallway before smashing a wine glass on the dining room table and walking outside. Strolling bare-foot through a muddy forest, she finds the girl sitting in the middle of a clearing with her arms raised as it begins to rain. Lorentzen offers a hand to her after witnessing her cry at the foot of a tree. The video ends with the pair walking off further into the forest, as the camera pans up through the trees.

== Track listing ==
Free MP3 download

- "Creeping in My Soul" – 3:50

Digital download

- "Creeping in My Soul" – 3:59

Digital download (classical version)

- "Creeping in My Soul" (feat. Christine & Budapest Art Orchestra) [Classical Version] – 3:32

== Credits and personnel ==
Recording

- Recorded, mastered and mixed at Hansen Studios, Ribe, Denmark

Personnel

- Eddie Simonsen – Production, recording, engineering, mixing (original version)
- Jacob Hansen – Production, recording, engineering, mixing (re-recorded and classical versions)
- Anthony Lledo – Songwriting
- Mikkel Maltha – Keyboards, piano, orchestral arrangements, additional vocals, songwriting, composition
- Kasper Søderlund – Lead guitar, bass guitar, composition (original and re-recorded versions)
- Christine Lorentzen – Vocals
- Jakob Gundel – Drums, composition (re-recorded version)
- Peter Due, Budapest Art Orchestra – Orchestral arrangements, composition (classical version)

== Release history ==
Region	Date	Format	Version	Label
Worldwide	March 13, 2007	Free MP3 download	Original	Christine Lorenzten
Worldwide	November 29, 2009	Digital download	Re-recorded	Cryoshell I/S
Worldwide	December 26, 2019	Digital download	Classical	Self-released
