= Liebling (album) =

Studio album by Andreas Johnson
- Released: 25 May 1999
- Genre: Alternative rock, pop rock
- Length: circa 46 minutes
- Label: Warner, Parlophone, WEA

Andreas Johnson chronology
Cottonfish Tales (1997)	Liebling (1999)	Deadly Happy (2002)

Liebling is the second studio album by Swedish musician Andreas Johnson. It was released on 25 May 1999 through Warner Music Group. Respectively, "People" and "The Games We Play" ranked 89 and 92 on the 2000 year-end for Music & Media's Border Breakers chart, which measured airplay for songs by European artists within the continent but outside each artist's country of record label signing.

== Track listing ==
1. "Glorious"
2. "People"
3. "The Games We Play"
4. "Do You Believe in Heaven"
5. "Should Have Been Me"
6. "Breathing"
7. "Patiently"
8. "Spaceless"
9. "Please (Do Me Right)"
10. "Safe from Harm"
11. "Unbreakable 11b - Honeydrop (starts 2.57)"

== Contributors ==
- Andreas Johnson - vocals, guitar
- Peter Kvint - guitar, keyboard, song
- Jerker Odelholm - bass
- Andreas Dahlbäck - drums, percussion

== Charts ==
Chart (1999–2000, 2004)	Peak positions
France	124
Norway	27
Sweden	21
Austria	36
