= Mr. Johnson, Your Room is on Fire =

Studio album by Andreas Johnson
- Released: 2 November 2005
- Genre: pop rock
- Label: Warner Music Sweden
- Producer: Peter Kvint

Andreas Johnson chronology
Deadly Happy (2002)	Mr. Johnson, Your Room is on Fire (2005)	The Collector (2007)

Mr. Johnson, Your Room is on Fire is a 2005 Andreas Johnson studio album. In 2006, the album was rereleased, including the song "Sing for Me".

== Track listing ==
1. Fools Like Us
2. Show Me XXXX
3. Sunshine of Mine
4. Caravan
5. Life Is
6. How Big Is America
7. Drop in the Ocean
8. Not Afraid
9. Exit New York
10. What If
11. Nobody Told Me (Such a Fool)
12. Still My World

=== Mr. Johnson, Your Room is on Fire, 2 ===
1. Sing for Me
2. Fools Like Us
3. Show Me XXXX
4. Sunshine of Mine
5. Caravan
6. Life Is
7. How Big Is America
8. Drop in the Ocean
9. Not Afraid
10. Exit New York
11. What If
12. Nobody Told Me (Such a Fool)
13. Still My World
14. Sing for Me (acoustic demo version)

== Contributors ==
- Andreas Johnson - vocals
- Peter Kvint - producer, guitar, bass, keyboard, melodica, pedal steel, vibraphone, organ, percussion
- Jerker Odelholm - bass
- Johan Lindström - guitar, piano, pedal steel
- Andreas Dahlbäck - drums, percussion

== Charts ==
Chart (2006)	Peak position
Sweden	5
