= Christine Lorentzen =

Danish musician

- Born: Christine Gyrsting Lorentzen
- Other name: Lore
- Education: Den Danske Reklameskole; Roskilde University; Denmark
- Occupations: Singer-songwriter; television presenter; project manager
- Musical career
- Genres: Alternative rock; hard rock; symphonic rock
- Instrument: Vocals
- Years active: 2006–present
- Labels: Cryoshell I/S; VME

Christine Gyrsting Lorentzen, also known as Lore, is a Danish singer-songwriter, project manager and former television presenter, best known as the lead vocalist of the rock band Cryoshell. Prior to joining the band, she competed in Scenen er din and later co-presented the third series of Vild med dans with Claus Elming.

== Career and education ==
Lorentzen studied project management in advertising at Den Danske Reklameskole (The Danish Advertising School) in 2004 and went on to study various project management-related courses at Roskilde University between 2005 and 2010. She managed her time as a student while working at Advance, a creative advertising agency based in Copenhagen, Denmark. Starting in 2000 as a receptionist, she rose through the company's ranks before leaving in 2010 with project manager experience.

After competing in the game show Scenen er din, Lorentzen replaced Andrea Elisabeth Rudolph as co-presenter in the third season of talent show Vild med dans with Claus Elming, however, both Lorentzen and Elming received negative criticism. She did not return for the show's fourth season and was replaced by her predecessor, Rudolph.

In late 2006 Lorentzen was offered the opportunity to provide vocals for the song "Creeping in My Soul" after auditioning for the part. Composed with Mikkel Maltha and Kasper Søderlund, the track was used in the promotional campaign for the Barraki wave of Lego Bionicle toys in 2007, and went on to become a popular MP3 download from the official Lego website. The song's success prompted Lego to produce further musical scores for later Bionicle campaigns, and by 2008, Lorentzen, Maltha and Søderlund released "Closer to the Truth", used to promote the Bionicle Mistika wave, under the band name Cryoshell.

Cryoshell spent the majority of 2009 recording their self-titled debut album. Released on 7 June 2010, it garnered critical success and sprawled the singles "Bye Bye Babylon" and "Creeping in My Soul" (a re-recording of the original). Lorentzen took maternity leave from the band between November 2011 and October 2013, being temporarily replaced by Tine Midtgaard. Upon her return, the group began developing their second effort, Next to Machines, which spawned four singles prior to release.

== Filmography ==
Year	Title	Role	Notes
2006	Scenen er din	Contestant	Season 3, Episode 7
2006	Vild med dans	Presenter	Season 3
2006	TV 2 006 – Årets seer	Herself	Television special
2010	The Lounge	Herself	Performance and interview
