= Cottonfish Tales =

Studio album by Andreas Johnson
- Released: 28 April 1997
- Genre: Pop rock
- Length: 42 mins
- Label: EMI

Andreas Johnson chronology
Cottonfish Tales (1997)	Liebling (1999)

Cottonfish Tales is the 1997 debut studio album by Andreas Johnson.

== Track listing ==
1. "Purple Morning"
2. "Head of the Family"
3. "Crush"
4. "Cruel"
5. "Trampoline"
6. "Like a Woman"
7. "Worth Waiting"
8. "Forever Needed"
9. "Seven Days"
10. "Room Above the Sun"
11. "Brave Thing"
12. "Night Stood Still"

== Contributors ==
- Andreas Johnson - vocals, guitar
- Johan Lindström – guitar, piano, organ, synthesizer, keyboard
- Anders Molin – bass
- Andreas Dahlbäck – drums, percussion
