= Village Idiot (album) =

Studio album by Andreas Johnson
- Released: 29 February 2012
- Genre: pop rock
- Length: 45 minutes
- Label: Warner Music Sweden

Andreas Johnson chronology
Tour Edition (2010)	Village Idiot (2012)

Village Idiot is a 2012 album by Andreas Johnson.

== Track listing ==
(All songs written by Andreas Johnson and Peter Kvint except track 8, which was written by Andreas Johnson alone)

1. One Day
2. Lovelight
3. Stuck
4. Buzzin'
5. Paris
6. One Man Army
7. My Religion
8. So Cruel So You
9. Escape
10. The Greatest Reward
11. Amsterdam
12. Solace

== Chart positions ==
Chart (2012)	Peak position
Sweden	17
