= Deadly Happy =

Studio album by Andreas Johnson
- Released: 11 February 2002
- Genre: pop rock
- Label: Warner Music Sweden

Andreas Johnson chronology
Liebling (1999)	Deadly Happy (2002)	Mr. Johnson, Your Room is on Fire (2005)

Deadly Happy is the third studio album by Andreas Johnson. It was released on 11 February 2002.

== Track listing ==
1. "Shine" - 3.42
2. "End of the World" - 4.15
3. "Waterfall" - 4.19
4. "The Greatest Day" - 3.56
5. "Brand New Thing" - 2.50
6. "Spirit of You" - 3.46
7. "Great Undying Love" - 4.37
8. "Deadly Happy" - 2.57
9. "The Pretty Ones" - 3.13
10. "This Time" - 3.13
11. "Make Me Beautiful" - 3.53
12. "My Love (Song for a Butterfly)" - 3.35
13. "Starcrossed" - 3.46

== Charts ==
Chart (2002)	Peak position
Sweden	45
