= Scenen er din =

- Genre: Talent show
- Presented by: Bubber
- Narrated by: Karsten Lagermann
- Country of origin: Denmark
- Original language: Danish
- No. of seasons: 4
- No. of episodes: 40

Production
- Production locations: Copenhagen, Denmark
- Camera setup: Karsten Jacobsen
- Running time: 70 min

Original release
- Network: TV 2
- Release: 17 September 2004 – 18 August 2007

Related
- Star Search

Scenen er din (The stage is yours) is a Danish television show hosted by Bubber. It is the Danish version of former American show Star Search.

The show is the biggest talent show in Denmark and is split into four categories: junior song (8–14 years), dance, entertainment and adult song (from 15 years). Formerly, the entertainment category was known as comedy. It is broadcast by TV 2 and produced by Blu Productions.

== Rules ==
The participants compete against each other, two against two through six preliminary rounds, and the round winners continue on to three semifinals. The winners qualify for the final, where the season winner wins 100,000 Danish kroner.

After every competitor has performed on stage, four judges give from one to five points each, for a maximum of 20 points.

While the next competitor performs, viewers can vote on their favorite by SMS. In the end the winner in each category are chosen.
