= In a Moment like This =

2010 Chanée & Tomas N'evergreen song

"In a Moment Like This"

Single by Chanée & N'evergreen

from the album In a Moment Like This
- Released: 5 February 2010
- Genre: Pop; Schlager
- Length: 3:01
- Label: My Way Music
- Songwriters: Thomas G:son, Henrik Sethsson, Erik Bernholm

Eurovision Song Contest 2010 entry
- Country: Denmark
- Artist: Chanée & N'evergreen
- Language: English
- Composers: Thomas G:son; Henrik Sethsson; Erik Bernholm
- Lyricists: Thomas G:son; Henrik Sethsson; Erik Bernholm

Finals performance
- Semi-final result: 5th
- Semi-final points: 101
- Final result: 4th
- Final points: 149

Entry chronology
- ◄ "Believe Again" (2009)
- "New Tomorrow" (2011) ►

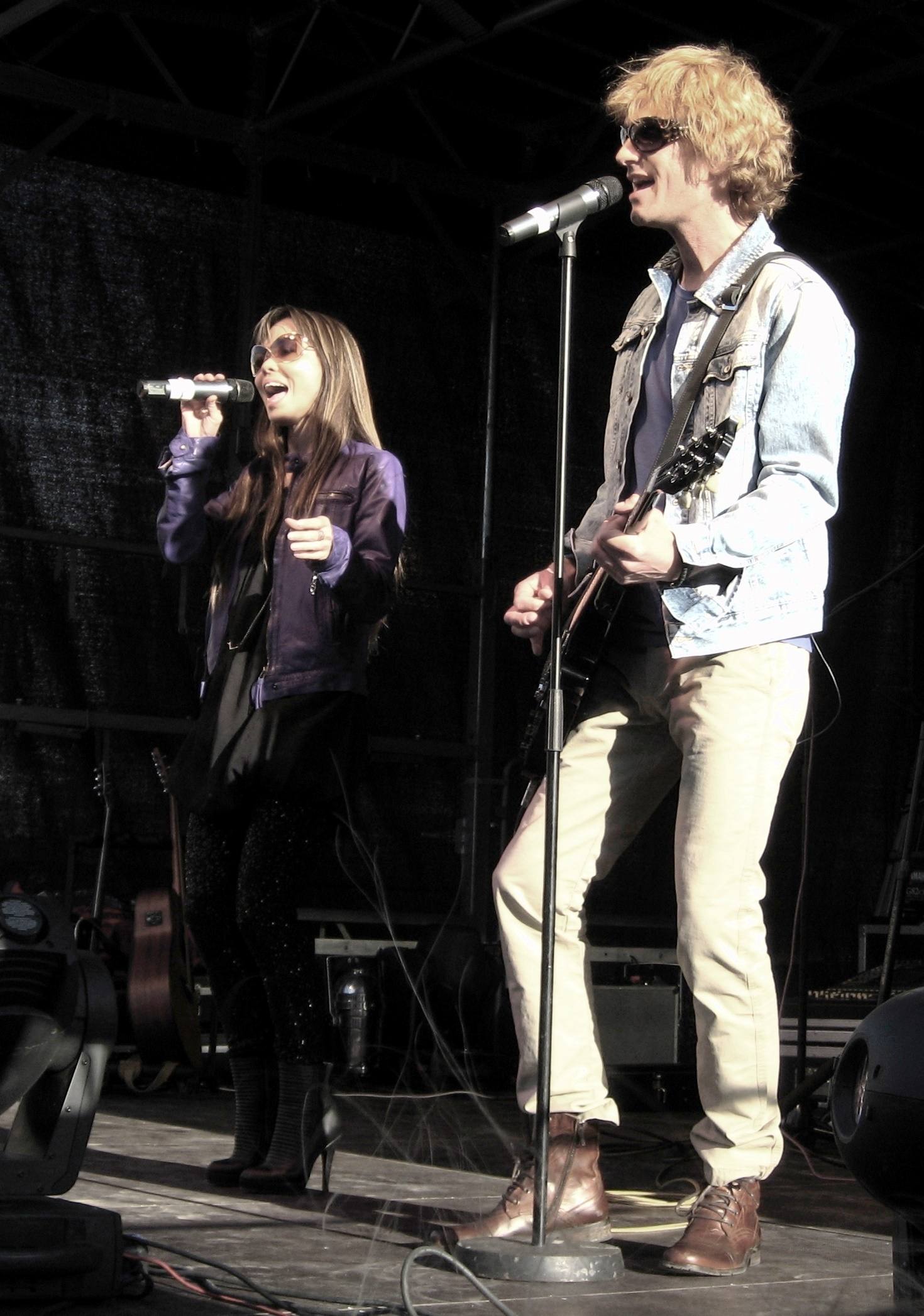
Chanée & N'evergreen performing in Hjørring, Denmark

"In a Moment Like This" is a song performed by Chanée and N'evergreen and written by Thomas G:son, Henrik Sethsson, and Erik Bernholm. It was the Danish entry at the Eurovision Song Contest 2010, held in Oslo, Norway on 29 May 2010.

The song was the winner of the Dansk Melodi Grand Prix contest, held on 6 February, which selected the Danish entry for Eurovision. With 149 points, they placed fourth at the Eurovision Song Contest 2010 held in Oslo.

Later in 2010, the song was covered by South African artists Lianie May & Jay. Swedish band Scotts recorded a cover version of the song as a duet with Erica Sjöström from the Drifters, which in 2010 appeared on both on the Scotts album Vi gör det igen and the Drifters' album Stanna hos mig.

== Charts ==
Chart (2010)	Peak position
Belgium (Ultratip Bubbling Under Flanders)	19
Denmark (Tracklisten)	2
Iceland (RÚV)	9
Norway (VG-lista)	5
Sweden (Sverigetopplistan)	21
Switzerland (Schweizer Hitparade)	12
UK Singles Chart	137
