= New Tomorrow =

2011 song by A Friend in London

Single by A Friend in London

from the album Unite
- Released: 25 February 2011
- Genre: Alternative rock, Pop
- Length: 3:03
- Label: MBO
- Songwriters: Lise Cabble, Jakob Schack Glæsner
- Producer: Frederik Thaae

A Friend in London singles chronology
"Now You're Here" (2010)	"New Tomorrow" (2011)	"Calling a Friend" (2011)

Eurovision Song Contest 2011 entry
- Country: Denmark
- Artist: A Friend in London
- Language: English
- Composers: Lise Cabble, Jakob Schack Glæsner
- Lyricists: Lise Cabble, Jakob Schack Glæsner

Finals performance
- Semi-final result: 2nd
- Semi-final points: 135
- Final result: 5th
- Final points: 134

Entry chronology
- ◄ "In a Moment Like This" (2010)
- "Should've Known Better" (2012) ►

"New Tomorrow" is a 2011 English language song by Danish pop/rock band A Friend in London. It represented Denmark in the Eurovision Song Contest 2011, held in Düsseldorf, Germany. On 26 February 2011, the song won the Danish preselection contest Dansk Melodi Grand Prix in 2011. It is the first single from their debut album, Unite.

Immediately after, the single was released in Denmark, making it straight to #3 in its first week of release (chart dated 4 March 2011).

The song was used as the Labour Party's anthem for the 2013 Malta elections.

== Controversy ==
"New Tomorrow" was written and composed by Lise Cabble and Jakob Glæsner. However, even before it was chosen to represent Denmark in the Eurovision Song Contest, it was accused of plagiarising parts of several different songs, e.g. "Herz an Herz" by German NDW band Paso Doble, "Sing for Me" by Swedish singer-songwriter Andreas Johnson, "Face 2 Face" by Future Trance United, "Super Star" by Taiwanese girl band S.H.E, "Silk Road" a Chinese folk tune interpreted by Kitaro, "Yasashii Uta" by Mucc, and "Shine" by Take That.

One of the co-writers Jacob Glæsner commented that "the song is very popular in its expression and consist basically only of five tones. It is unavoidable that it doesn’t remind of a song one has already heard".

== Performance ==
A Friend in London performed the song during Eurovision 2011 finishing fifth overall with 134 points, including 12 points from Ireland, Iceland and the Netherlands and 10 points from Sweden and Estonia and 8 points from Slovenia.

== Track listing ==
- Digital download
1. "New Tomorrow" – 3:03
2. "New Tomorrow" (live from Smukfest 2012) – 6:33

== Charts and certifications ==
=== Charts ===
Chart (2011)	Peak position
Belgium (Ultratip Bubbling Under Flanders)	48
Denmark (Tracklisten)	2
Netherlands (Single Top 100)	58
Iceland (RÚV)	1
Ireland (IRMA)	9
Switzerland (Schweizer Hitparade)	39
UK Singles (OCC)	78
UK Indie (OCC)	10

=== Certifications ===
Region	Certification	Certified units/sales
Denmark (IFPI Danmark)	Gold	15,000^{^}
Streaming
Denmark (IFPI Danmark)	Gold	50,000^{†}
^{^} Shipments figures based on certification alone.^{†} Streaming-only figures based on certification alone.

== Release history ==
Country	Date	Format
Denmark	25 February 2011	Digital download
Worldwide	8 March 2011	Digital download
