= Sing for Me (Andreas Johnson song) =

Single by Andreas Johnson

from the album Mr. Johnson, Your Room is on Fire
- Released: 2006
- Recorded: 2006
- Genre: Pop

Andreas Johnson singles chronology
"Show Me Love" (2005)	"Sing for Me" (2006)	"Fools Like Us" (2006)

Music video
- "Sing for Me" on YouTube

"Sing for Me" is an English language song by Swedish singer Andreas Johnson that he presented in Melodifestivalen 2006 in a bid to represent Sweden in the Eurovision Song Contest

It was released in 2006, becoming the most successful of all his singles reaching #2 on Sverigetopplistan, the official Swedish Singles Chart and was certified gold. The song also appears on his album Mr. Johnson, Your Room Is On Fire. The album itself reached #4 on the Swedish Albums Chart.

== Track listing ==
CD single

1. "Sing For Me (Original Version)" - 3:04
2. "Sing For Me (Acoustic Demo Version)" - 3:05

CD maxi

1. "Sing For Me (Original Version)" - 3:04
2. "Sing For Me (Soundfactory Radio Edit)" - 3:59
3. "Sing For Me (Soundfactory Futureretro Mix)" - 8:31
4. "Sing For Me (Soundfactory Futureretro Dub)" - 8:40
5. "Sing For Me (Acoustic Version)" - 3:05

== Chart performance ==
=== Weekly charts ===
Chart (2006)	Peak position
Sweden (Sverigetopplistan)	2

=== Year-end charts ===
Chart (2006)	Position
Sweden (Sverigetopplistan)	21
