= Voices Music & Entertainment =

Norwegian record label

Voices Music & Entertainment is a record label based in Oslo, Norway established in 1988 by Ketil Sveen and Dag Krogsvold. In the first years the company was a label focusing on signing and developing Norwegian rock acts. Since then the company has expanded rapidly, and business areas now also include distribution and publishing evolving from Voices of Wonder in 2001.

In 1996 Voices of Wonder also founded a fully owned subsidiary in Denmark bringing in Tom Jensen as partner in the company.

VM&E (VME) operates in a diverse range of music genres from dance to black metal, runs a number of sublabels and distributes records of foreign labels.

== Sublabels ==
- Beatservice
- Bad Afro Records
- DJ Beat Records Scandinavia
- Euphonious Records
- Jester Records
- Music for Dreams
- Head Not Found
- Voices of Wonder
