= Glorious (Andreas Johnson song) =

1999 single by Andreas Johnson

Single by Andreas Johnson

from the album Liebling
- B-side: "Submerged"
- Released: April 1999
- Length: 3:27
- Label: WEA
- Songwriter: Andreas Johnson
- Producer: Peter Kvint

Andreas Johnson singles chronology
"Seven Days" (1997)	"Glorious" (1999)	"The Games We Play" (1999)

Audio sample
- Andreas Johnson – "Glorious": file; help

"Glorious" is a song by Swedish singer-songwriter Andreas Johnson, released as a single in April 1999 on the WEA label. It is from Johnson's second album, Liebling (1999). In early 2000, the song peaked within the top 10 of the charts in Italy and the United Kingdom.

"Glorious" was used as the main theme for Sky Sports Premier League shows Ford Super Sunday and Ford Football Special from August 2000 to May 2001. The song was later used on television advertisements for Vauxhall, Volvo, and in 2004, for Nutella, thus allowing the song to re-enter the French Singles Chart at a peak of number 16.

== Track listings ==
CD single

1. "Glorious" – 3:29
2. "Submerged" – 8:33

CD maxi

1. "Glorious" – 3:27
2. "Submerged" – 4:41
3. "Honeydrop" – 3:49

CD maxi (US release)

1. "Glorious" (Num edit) – 3:44
2. "Glorious" (Num club mix) – 9:23
3. "Glorious" (Num dub) – 8:05
4. "Glorious" (Hybrid mix) – 9:44
5. "Glorious" (Ice Pop remix) – 5:42
6. "Glorious" (Mystic Slow remix) – 4:21
- Contains" two videos of "Glorious" (original version) and "Glorious" (Num edit)

== Charts ==
=== Weekly charts ===
Weekly chart performance for "Glorious"
Chart (1999–2001)	Peak position
Belgium (Ultratip Bubbling Under Flanders)	9
Europe (Eurochart Hot 100)	13
France (SNEP)	50
Germany (GfK)	79
Iceland (Íslenski Listinn Topp 40)	27
Ireland (IRMA)	13
Italy (Musica e dischi)	2
Italy Airplay (Music & Media)	4
Netherlands (Dutch Top 40)	25
Netherlands (Single Top 100)	51
New Zealand (Recorded Music NZ)	41
Norway (VG-lista)	16
Scotland Singles (OCC)	3
Sweden (Sverigetopplistan)	13
Switzerland (Schweizer Hitparade)	40
UK Singles (OCC)	4
US Adult Pop Airplay (Billboard)	35
US Dance Club Songs (Billboard)	8
US Dance Singles Sales (Billboard)	36

Chart (2004)	Peak position
France (SNEP)	16

=== Year-end charts ===
Year-end chart performance for "Glorious"
Chart (1999)	Position
Europe Border Breakers (Music & Media)	35
Netherlands (Dutch Top 40)	154
Sweden (Hitlistan)	66

Chart (2000)	Position
UK Singles (OCC)	107

== Certifications ==
Certifications and sales for "Glorious"
Region	Certification	Certified units/sales
Sweden (GLF)	Gold	15,000^{^}
United Kingdom (BPI)	Silver	200,000^{‡}
^{^} Shipments figures based on certification alone.^{‡} Sales+streaming figures based on certification alone.

== Release history ==
Release dates and formats for "Glorious"
Region	Date	Format(s)	Label(s)	Ref.
Sweden	April 1999	CD	WEA	
Germany	18 October 1999	Maxi-CD	WEA	
United Kingdom	24 January 2000	CD; cassette	WEA	
United States	12 March 2001	Adult album alternative radio	Reprise	
United States	7 May 2001	Hot adult contemporary radio	Reprise	
United States	11 June 2001	Contemporary hit radio	Reprise	
