= Andreas Johnson =

Swedish singer-songwriter (born 1970)

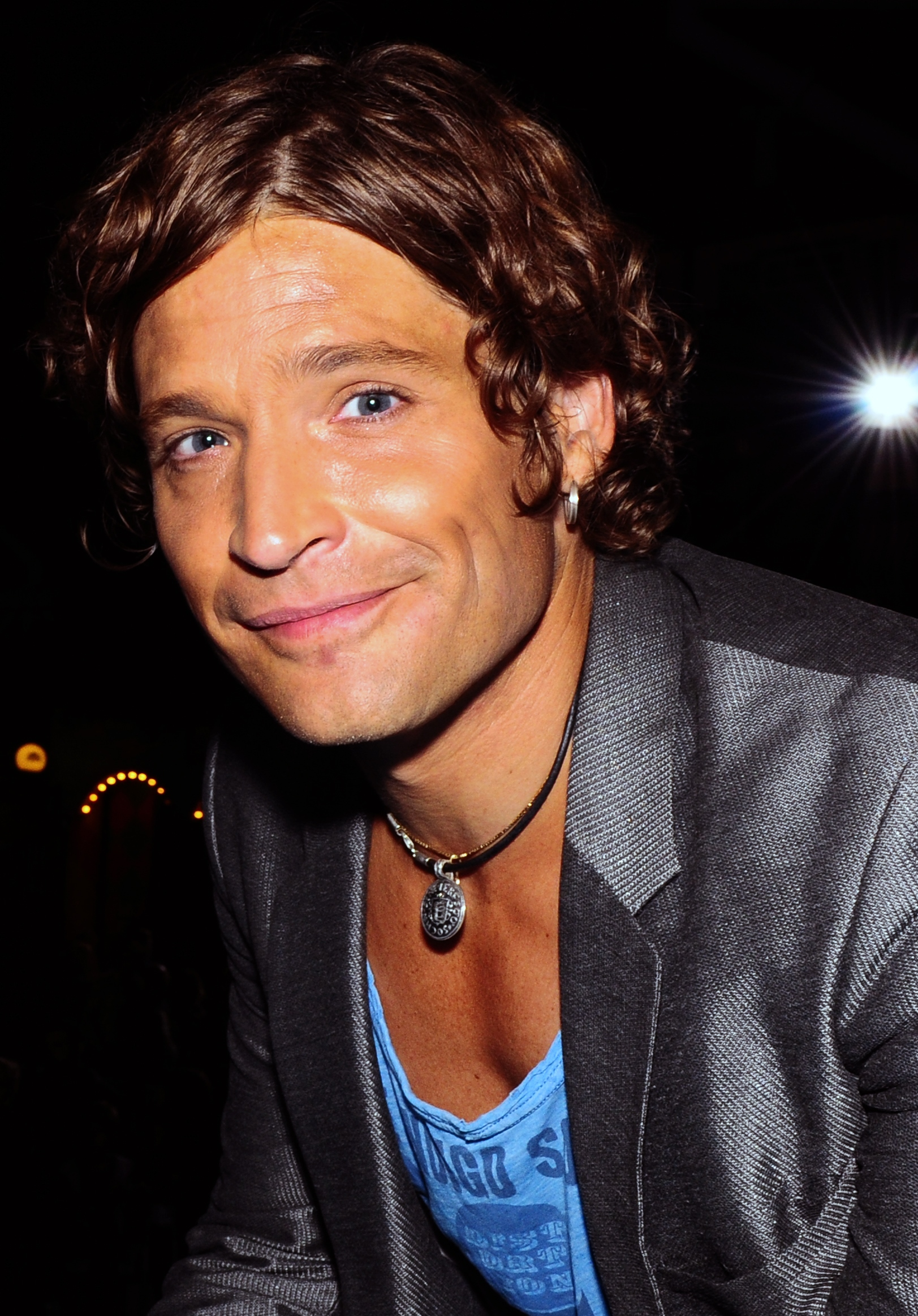
- Johnson on Sommarkrysset in Stockholm, 2012

Background information
- Born: Jon Erik Andreas Johnson; 22 March 1970 (age 56); Bjärred, Sweden
- Origin: Stockholm, Sweden
- Genres: Pop; rock
- Occupation: Singer-songwriter
- Years active: 1997–present
- Label: Warner Music
- Website: www.andreas-johnson.com

Jon Erik Andreas Johnson (born 22 March 1970) is a Swedish pop/rock singer-songwriter and musician.

== Career ==
Johnson was born in Bjärred, Sweden; both his parents were professional jazz musicians. During this period in his life he became familiar with late-night gigs and the constant travel associated with performances, joining his parents on the road regularly. After finally settling down in a Stockholm suburb, Johnson started his musical career as the singer in Planet Waves, a band which released only one album, Brutal Awakenings before splitting up due to internal conflicts. He then turned to a solo career, releasing the debut album, Cottonfish Tales.

In 1999, he had an international hit with the single "Glorious", which later featured on the album Liebling, and has been used in a number of advertisements from companies including Volvo, Nutella and Vauxhall. The song "People" was also used in a commercial for the American TBS station.

Deadly Happy, his third solo album, was released in 2002. The next album, Mr Johnson, Your Room Is On Fire, was released in 2005 on Warner Music.

=== Melodifestivalen participation ===
Johnson participated in Melodifestivalen 2006, the Swedish song selection contest for the Eurovision Song Contest, and finished in third place in the final round.

On 24 February 2007, Johnson participated in Melodifestivalen 2007 with the song "A Little Bit of Love", which was announced as a finalist in the contest. On 10 March 2007, the song placed second in Melodifestivalen 2007, losing to "The Worrying Kind" performed by The Ark.

On 16 February 2008, Johnson took part in the 2nd semi-final of Melodifestivalen 2008, accompanied by Carola Häggkvist who had previously performed songs winning Melodifestivalen in 1983, 1991 and 2006. The duo performed the song One Love, managed to get to the 'second chance', but lost there against Nordman.

Johnson participated again in Melodifestivalen 2010 with the song "We Can Work It Out" and placed sixth in the final. He competed again in Melodifestivalen 2012, where he performed his song "Lovelight" in the third semi-final and subsequently went on to the Second Chance, where he lost the quarter-final duel.

He participated again in Melodifestivalen 2015 with the song Living to Die, where was eliminated in the semi-finals.

He participated in Melodifestivalen 2019 with the song "Army of Us". He was eliminated after losing his duel in Andra Chansen.

== Discography ==
Studio albums

- Cottonfish Tales (1997)
- Liebling (1999)
- Deadly Happy (2002)
- Mr. Johnson, Your Room is on Fire (2005)
- Rediscovered (2008)
- Village Idiot (2012)
