= Bionicle (disambiguation) =

Bionicle was a line of toys and associated media made by Lego from 2000 to 2016.

Bionicle may also refer to:

== Lego media ==
Various official Bionicle media properties produced or licensed by Lego, especially:

- Bionicle (film series)
  - Bionicle: Mask of Light (2003)
  - Bionicle 2: Legends of Metru Nui (2004)
  - Bionicle 3: Web of Shadows (2005)
  - Bionicle: The Legend Reborn (2009)
- Bionicle (video game), also called Bionicle: The Game, released for multiple platforms in 2003
  - Bionicle: Quest for the Toa, a Game Boy Advance game released in 2001
  - Bionicle: Matoran Adventures, a Game Boy Advance game released in 2002
  - Bionicle: Maze of Shadows, a Game Boy Advance game released in 2005
  - Bionicle Heroes, a multi-platform game released in 2006
  - Bionicle: Quest for Mata Nui, an upcoming fan-made videogame developed by CrainyCreations
  - Bionicle: Masks of Power, a cancelled fan-made videogame developed by Team Kanohi
