= Mata Nui =

Mata Nui may refer to:

- Mata Nui, a character in the Lego Bionicle series
  - Mata Nui Online Game, a browser game
  - Mata Nui Online Game II, the sequel to the game of the same name

== See also ==
- Motu Nui, an islet near Easter Island
- Matanui, a genus of triplefin blennies
- Matanaui, a divergent Amazonian language
