= Bionicle: Matoran Adventures =

2002 video game

- North American box art
- Developer: Argonaut Games
- Publishers: Electronic Arts; Lego Interactive
- Designers: Alex Rutter; Paul McGinniss
- Programmers: Aaron Fothergill; Martin Piper
- Artists: Jason Cunningham; Leon Brazil; Carl Ross
- Composers: Justin Scharvona; Chris Sweetman
- Series: Bionicle
- Platform: Game Boy Advance
- Release: NA: October 28, 2002; EU: November 1, 2002
- Genre: Platformer
- Mode: Single-player

Bionicle: Matoran Adventures is a 2002 platform game based on Lego's Bionicle line of constructible action figures. It was developed by Argonaut Games and co-published by Electronic Arts and Lego Interactive for the Game Boy Advance. The player controls Matoran and Turaga characters, who must work together to repel the invasion of Bohrok, insect-like robots that threaten the island of Mata Nui.

The game features six levels and three boss battles. Matoran can jump higher and throw discs, while Turaga can activate switches and destroy obstacles; players can switch between the two during gameplay depending on need, similar to the 1993 video game The Lost Vikings. Additional characters can be unlocked by collecting mask pieces scattered throughout levels. Matoran Adventures received mixed reviews from critics. The gameplay and charm were praised by some, with some comparing it favorably to The Lost Vikings, while its short length and lack of creativity were more poorly received.

== Story and gameplay ==
Switching between the smaller Matoran character and the larger Turaga character is required to progress in the game.

Matoran Adventures is set on the fictional island of Mata Nui, a "tropical paradise" with six elementally-themed regions. Each region (the aquatic region of Ga-Wahi, the jungle region of Le-Wahi, the icy and mountainous region of Ko-Wahi, the subterranean region of Onu-Wahi, the desert region of Po-Wahi, and the volcanic region of Ta-Wahi) makes up one of the game's six levels. The game follows a Matoran as they attempt to repel the invasion of the insect-like Bohrok swarm. In the official Bionicle story, the Bohrok are instead defeated by the Toa.

Matoran Adventures is a side-scrolling platform game with puzzle elements. The player can choose from three difficulty levels (Easy, Medium, and Hard). The game utilizes a character-swapping mechanic similar to The Lost Vikings (1993). As needed, the player can swap between Matoran and Turaga to advance past obstacles. The Matoran character can jump and throw discs to combat enemies, while the Turaga character can break obstacles using their elemental power and activate switches. The Turaga character cannot jump as high as the Matoran. The game features six levels and three boss encounters. The Matoran character's disc is upgraded as the game progresses. Pieces of masks are scattered throughout each level. By gathering all of the pieces of a particular mask, they gain the ability to play as a different Matoran character. One Matoran character, Kongu, is available from the start; the other five Matoran characters must be unlocked.

== Development and release ==
Matoran Adventures was developed by UK-based Argonaut Games, previously known for their work on Star Fox (1993). It marked the second Game Boy Advance game based on the Bionicle line to be developed, following 2001's Lego Bionicle: Quest for the Toa. In addition to Matoran Adventures, Argonaut was also slated to produce a separate Bionicle game for home consoles to be released in 2003. Matoran Adventures was published jointly by Electronic Arts and Lego Interactive, along with two other Lego-themed titles (Drome Racers and Galidor: Defenders of the Outer Dimension). By partnering with EA, Lego hoped to gain a foothold with young gamers in the 6-12 year old demographic.

The game's first screenshots were unveiled at E3 2002, and the game itself was slated for release in late 2002. The game was one of five EA games for the Game Boy Advance to be showcased at the event. Matoran Adventures was showcased in July 2002 at EA's Camp EA event; Craig Harris of IGN felt this early version, which he described as "barely alpha", was already "much better" than Quest for the Toa. Additional screenshots were released in August, with the final release date still pending. The game was released in North America on October 28, and in Europe on November 1.

== Reception ==
Reception

Review scores
Publication	Score
Game Informer	7.75/10
GameZone	7.2/10
IGN	3.0/10
Planet Gameboy	43%
Total Advance	74%

Matoran Adventures received mixed reviews from critics. Its gameplay and charm were praised, while its short length and creativity were criticized. Matt Helgeson called Matoran Adventures "surprisingly tight" and "as good a non-Nintendo GBA title I've seen in a long time", praising the variety of gameplay and comparing it favorably to The Lost Vikings. Total Advance reviewer Jem Roberts offered high praise for the gameplay as "surprisingly addictive" and "bursting with charm", citing it as superior to Quest for the Toa. However, Roberts felt the game's six levels and completion time of "roughly three hours" were "inexcusable". Michael Lafferty of GameZone called Matoran Adventures a "solid and a pleasant diversion", praising the game for incorporating the "charm and innovative ideas" of the Bionicle story, but felt it otherwise was simply an "average arcade-adventure".

Planet Gameboy criticized Matoran Adventures as "uncreative" and "listless" and suggested readers play with Lego toys instead. Adam Tierney of IGN dubbed the game "bland and glitchy" and a "less-than-average platformer". He also criticized the game's visuals, jittery camera, short length, and the abundance of "leaps of faith" that resulted in deaths in bottomless pits.

== See also ==
- List of Lego video games
