= Bionicle: Quest for Mata Nui =

Upcoming fangame

- Developer: CrainyCreations
- Director: Crainy
- Composers: Garrett Beelow; Jonathan Kaplan
- Engine: StarCraft II
- Platforms: macOS, Windows
- Genre: Action role-playing
- Mode: Single-player

Bionicle: Quest for Mata Nui is a fan-made action role-playing video game created by CrainyCreations. Based on The Lego Group's Bionicle line of constructible action figures, it is an open world action role-playing game and a reimagining of the 2001 Bionicle story. In the game the player controls the Toa, elementally-powered warriors who set out to free Mata Nui and its inhabitants from the evil Makuta, who have corrupted the native Rahi animals. A trailer was released in April 2020, with gameplay and combat trailers released in the following days. The trailers have been received positively by critics, who have praised the gameplay and visuals.

== Gameplay and story ==
Bionicle: Quest for Mata Nui is an open world action role-playing game. It is being developed in the StarCraft II engine. Combat consists of various types of melee attacks and elemental attacks; additional abilities come from Kanohi masks, which can be toggled between at will. Progression in the game comes from collecting Kanohi masks, which grant the player new abilities and open up new parts of the game world to explore, as well as in collecting disks, which allow the player to upgrade abilities. The game was planned to have multiplayer with up to six players, matching the total number of playable Toa. According to Crainy, the implementation would have been similar to multiplayer mods for The Elder Scrolls V: Skyrim, where each player is treated equally in regards to story. However, in a post on Discord on May 20, Crainy announced the feature would not be available at launch.

The game's story will follow the 2001 Bionicle story arc where the six Toa, elemental warriors, set to free the island of Mata Nui from the control of the evil Makuta, who is controlling the island's wildlife, known as the Rahi.

== Development and promotion ==
According to the game's creator, Crainy, Bionicle: Quest for Mata Nui has been in development since March 2014. In an interview with TechRaptor, Crainy explained that he had been a fan of Bionicle since he was a kid and had always wanted to play a Bionicle role-playing video game; he described the project as being the game he always wanted to play. Most of the game's development was done by Crainy, and he received help in some areas like 3D modeling. After the public release of the game's trailer, the project acquired additional talent to help with 3D modeling, writing, and composing. Tony Wedgewood, who provided voiceovers for the Bionicle commercials from 2000 to 2010, confirmed that he would provide dialogue and voiceovers for promotional material for the game.

The game does not have a set release date; Crainy intends to release versions of the game only when there is a "more or less complete Bionicle experience". Beta tests will be conducted at some point. The game will be free to play and no money will be charged.

The game's was officially announced in a trailer in April 2020. Combat and gameplay trailers were released in the following days. Lego Games, via the Lego Ambassador Network, confirmed in September that Crainy was in talks with the studio regarding the continued development of the game, and that they "see game development as an exciting opportunity to add new way to engage with the LEGO brick". In an interview with Vice that same month, Crainy said he had met with Lego and the company had given him some guidelines that would prevent the project from facing legal action; Lego specifically noted the game could not be released for profit. Crainy said that "I am confident that I can complete the game according to my vision that I've always had for it".

As of 2024, the development of the game remains unknown.

== Reception ==
Wes Fenlon of PC Gamer called it "the kind of impossibly ambitious fan project that sounds like it would never actually get made or released" but was impressed by the combat, environments, and existence of side quests. Although he said that "there's a lot that feels missing from a proper finished game, even after six years of work", he praised it as "impressive for a fan project" and felt the game had a good chance at being completed. Imogen Donovan of VideoGamer.com called the game "resplendent" and praised its cutscenes as being superior to the Bionicle direct-to-video films. She also felt that its narrative could be comparable to other open-world games and noted its combat style as being similar to that of the Dark Souls series. Dale Bashir of IGN said that "a lot of love can be seen in the project, especially in how faithful the ten-man team stuck to the source material" and praised the addition of side characters like Jaller and Takua. Maximilien Cagnard of Jeuxactu praised the ambition of the game and said he would almost like to see Lego officially license and fund it. Przemysław Wańtuchowicz of Eurogamer Poland praised the ambitiousness of the game as well as its dynamic combat. Vice writer Patrick Klepek said Quest for Mata Nui looks "legitimately good" and that he would "totally believe" it was an official Lego product.

Fabiano Uslenghi of GameStar praised the nostalgia the trailer offered but was somewhat skeptical of if it could be completed and that Lego wouldn't intervene. Ewan Moore of LADBible also was concerned but felt that the dormant status of the Bionicle franchise would mean Lego wouldn't have a reason to. Fenlon speculated that the game would be safe, noting that Lego had not taken down other Bionicle fan games like Lego Bionicle: The Legend of Mata Nui Rebuilt or fan servers for Lego Universe, a discontinued massively multiplayer online game.
