= Lego Bionicle: The Legend of Mata Nui =

Canceled video game by Saffire Corporation

- Promotional box art
- Developer: Saffire
- Publisher: Lego Software
- Series: Bionicle
- Platforms: GameCube, Microsoft Windows
- Release: Canceled (Note: Originally scheduled to release in late 2001. Several of the game's alpha and beta builds were released online in 2018 by The Beaverhouse. Litestone Studios released version 1.0 of Bionicle: The Legend of Mata Nui Rebuilt in 2019.)
- Genre: Action-adventure
- Mode: Single-player

Lego Bionicle: The Legend of Mata Nui is a canceled action-adventure video game developed by Saffire. Based on the Lego Group's Bionicle line of constructible action figures, the game was intended to release on Microsoft Windows computers in late 2001 and the GameCube in early 2002. The game was designed as a direct sequel to Saffire's Game Boy Advance game Lego Bionicle: Quest for the Toa, which was released in October 2001. The story of The Legend of Mata Nui was meant to serve as a conclusion to the 2001 Bionicle story arc, focusing on the Toa, heroic elemental warriors destined to defeat the evil Makuta, who is attacking the island of Mata Nui with corrupted Rahi animals.

The Legend of Mata Nui has a three-dimensional, third-person perspective and a similar gameplay style to The Legend of Zelda games Ocarina of Time and Majora's Mask, with the player collecting items that enable them to progress further in the game's open environments. Players are tasked with rescuing villagers and defeating Makuta's Rahi and elemental monsters. Each Toa possesses unique abilities based on the element that they control, and additional abilities can be gained by finding the powerful Kanohi masks scattered throughout the island.

Development of The Legend of Mata Nui began in early 2000 and lasted until October 2001, when the game was suddenly canceled two months away from its planned December release. According to the game's development team, it was around 90% complete at the time of its cancellation, with most of the unfinished elements being in the game's climax; a planned final battle with Makuta was never developed. The game's cancellation led to the planned story content being revealed through other mediums as well as the gradual demise of Saffire. Heavily promoted by Lego in anticipation of its upcoming release, The Legend of Mata Nui became widely sought after by Bionicle fans in the wake of its cancellation. In 2018, two developmental builds of the game were leaked online. YouTube community The Beaverhouse went on to found Litestone Studios, an independent video game development studio, with the goal of completing the game with support for modern computers. Version 1.0 of the updated game, Bionicle: The Legend of Mata Nui Rebuilt, was released on August 10, 2019.

== Gameplay ==
Each Toa character has a unique ability based on their elemental power; Kopaka, the Toa of ice, can snowboard down mountains.

The Legend of Mata Nui is an action-adventure game where the player takes control of the six Toa, each of whom has their own tools, weapons, and elemental powers. Each of the Toa is controlled in the portion of the island of Mata Nui that represents their unique elemental power (air, earth, fire, ice, stone, and water, respectively). The game has a three-dimensional, third-person perspective and places an emphasis on platforming, with the player progressing through large, open environments. The player is tasked with helping the island's villagers by saving them from hostile Rahi animals, finding and returning items to villagers, and solving puzzles. The player can explore the various parts of the island, including its six villages. Combat consists primarily of launching elemental spheres at Rahi, but the Rahi can also be directly attacked with the Toa's weapons or halted by pointing the cursor at them. The Rahi enemies the player encounters include the Bionicle equivalent of animals like tigers and scorpions.

Liam Robertson of Did You Know Gaming? noted the game's structure to be similar to that of The Legend of Zelda games Ocarina of Time and Majora's Mask; like in those games, the player finds items that enable them to explore new areas of each level. Additionally, The Legend of Mata Nui makes prominent use of a grappling hook, which is a staple item in The Legend of Zelda series. Among the items that can be collected in the game are Kanohi, masks which allow the Toa to access abilities like shielding, levitation, mind control, telekinesis, and water breathing. Kanohi can be switched between on command by the player and are passed on the next Toa upon the completion of the previous one's area, which allows the player to retain all of the abilities they have gained as the game progresses. Each Toa also has unique abilities that the other Toa lack; for example, Tahu, the Toa of fire, can surf on lava, while Lewa, the Toa of air, can swing on vines. After collecting enough Kanohi and completing enough tasks, the player is tasked with defeating an elemental monster. The only portion of the game where the Toa's Kanohi powers are unavailable is during the battles with the elemental monsters, during which they are disabled.

== Synopsis ==
=== Background and setting ===
A direct sequel to Lego Bionicle: Quest for the Toa (a Game Boy Advance title that was also developed by Saffire), The Legend of Mata Nui begins immediately following the events of that game, in which the villager Takua rescues the Turaga elders of Mata Nui's six villages and gathers the Toa Stones, summoning the Toa, six elemental warriors prophesied to defeat the evil Makuta. According to Bionicle writer Greg Farshtey, The Legend of Mata Nui was intended to serve as the conclusion for the 2001 story arc. Following its cancellation, the story elements that were planned to be introduced in the game were instead revealed elsewhere. An online point-and-click adventure game, the Mata Nui Online Game, became the primary story source for the year instead.

=== Plot ===
The wild creatures of the island of Mata Nui, the Rahi, have been corrupted by the evil Makuta, who is using them to attack the Matoran and take control of the island for himself. After descending from the sky in their Toa canisters, the six Toa drift aimlessly in the ocean but are summoned to the island, arriving across its six regions. Onua (the Toa of earth), is the first to awaken, followed by Gali (the Toa of water), Pohatu (the Toa of stone), Kopaka (the Toa of ice), Lewa (the Toa of air), and Tahu (the Toa of fire). The Toa search for Kanohi, powerful masks that grant them new abilities, while aiding the island's Matoran and defeating Makuta's six elemental monsters.

The Toa briefly converse with each other during the quest, also sharing their collected Kanohi with each other. After gathering all of the Kanohi and defeating all six elemental monsters, the Toa team up and enter Makuta's lair, hidden underneath an ancient temple. Inside, two groups of three Toa each combine into the two Toa Kaita and defeat the Manas, powerful minions of Makuta. The Toa Kaita dissolve back into their original forms and conquer six different areas of Makuta's lair before facing and defeating Makuta, (Note: A battle with Makuta was not included in the game's final build.) releasing a light from the temple visible across the entire island. As the Matoran celebrate Makuta's defeat, a creature (later known to be the Bohrok) awakens underneath the island.

== Promotion ==
This advertisement for The Legend of Mata Nui was included in the July 2001 Bionicle comic Deep Into Darkness.

The Legend of Mata Nui was originally set to release alongside Quest for the Toa in September 2001. The game was later announced for a December release in the October 2001 Bionicle comic Triumph of the Toa, and a port of the game for the Nintendo GameCube was planned for release in 2002. At US$25, The Legend of Mata Nui would have been sold for a cheaper price than Quest for the Toa, which was sold for $40.

Prior to its cancellation, The Legend of Mata Nui was heavily promoted by Lego. Ben Sledge of IGN described its contemporary promotional campaign as "surprisingly extensive at the time for a game that never came out". Boxes of Cheerios cereal were packaged with a CD-ROM disc that contained a cutscene from the game, and its upcoming release was frequently mentioned in the Bionicle comics series as well as the Bionicle website. Lego also planned to include an exclusive mask (the Kanohi Vahi, the mask of time) with copies of the game. A public call for beta testers was put out by Lego, although these beta tests never took place due to the game's cancellation.

== Development and cancellation ==
=== Early development ===
Development of The Legend of Mata Nui began in early 2000. Saffire had been recommended to Lego by Nintendo; Hal Rushton, the president of Saffire, felt the two companies were similar in that they both placed an emphasis on "high moral standards". Saffire employee Jay Ward called the partnership between Lego and Saffire as a "good fit", describing both companies as being "family oriented". Saffire was headquartered in American Fork, Utah, which Rushton noted had many people who could speak multiple languages; this was important to Lego because they wanted the game to support nine languages.

According to Rushton, Saffire brainstormed with Lego employees to create the creature designs for both The Legend of Mata Nui and Quest for the Toa. As the six villages of Mata Nui had not been shown in other Bionicle media sources, Saffire was given a substantial amount of creative freedom in designing each of them. Some of the village designs were drastically altered in development; in the game's alpha build, the water village of Ga-Koro is depicted as consisting of "huts built on massive floating water-lilies in a bay", a design that was later featured in other Bionicle media like the Mata Nui Online Game, but the game's beta build adopted a drastically different design.

=== Māori controversy ===
Bionicle was unique among Lego toy lines at the time in that it encompassed both toys and video games, with the setting of the toys being explained through games. The story and setting of Bionicle took inspiration from Polynesian culture and languages, with Māori language and influence being especially prominent through character names, myths, tribal symbols, and rituals. Māori representatives were not pleased with this, finding it to be inappropriate and a "trivialization" of their culture. Māori groups had taken particular offense to the use of the word Tohunga, which in the Bionicle story referred to the island's ordinary villagers; in the Māori language, the term referred to experts in a specific field. The Māori groups sought to have Lego remove these terms from the toy line and games. Lego denied claims of cultural appropriation, with spokeswoman Eva Lykkegaard noting that the company had not attempted to trademark any Māori terms and had only sought a trademark for the word Bionicle, which Lego had created. Lego ultimately agreed to stop using Tohunga, along with several other words, and Saffire removed all mentions of them from both The Legend of Mata Nui and Tales of the Tohunga, which was renamed Quest for the Toa.

=== Development issues and cancellation ===
Lego initially gave Saffire Corporation leeway in development but became increasingly involved in The Legend of Mata Nui as development progressed. Although the concept of Bionicle inherently involved conflict and all of the Toa wielded tools or weapons, Lego became increasingly concerned with the level of violence. At one point, a visual function was created where defeated Rahi would explode into individual pieces; Lego found this to be too violent and requested it be removed. According to former Saffire employee Darvell Hunt, Lego had decided by the middle of 2001 that the game was too violent, and following the September 11 attacks they demanded all violence be removed from the game.

Additionally, Saffire was facing increasing financial difficulties throughout the game's development. The development team reported difficulty receiving their promised paychecks during the final months of the game's development, despite many of them taking on shifts of "up to 70 hours per week". Hunt said that by the time he was laid off in October 2001, Saffire was "at least six weeks behind with payroll".

The game was finally canceled in October 2001. Multiple reasons were given for the game's cancellation. In a statement to the Bionicle fansite Mask of Destiny, a Lego spokesman attributed it to the game's development issues, including "chip compatibility and timing", and said that the cancellation "reflects [Lego's] commitment to maintaining the strength, longevity and value" of the Bionicle brand. In 2010, Bionicle writer Greg Farshtey said that The Legend of Mata Nui was canceled because Lego felt the game was of poor quality. Internally, different reasons were given. Some employees were told the decision was due to the September 11 attacks, which the employees considered an "incredulous" claim, while others were told the decision was due to shifts in Lego management as well as a decision to go with a pitch for a multi-platform game from Argonaut Games, which would ultimately become 2003's Bionicle: The Game. In an interview in June 2021, Jeff James, who was the producer for games at the Lego Group, said the cancelation had nothing to do with the September 11 attacks. He attributed it to the chip compatibility issue as well as concerns over the game's ability to be completely finished by its planned release date.

According to members of the development team, The Legend of Mata Nui was around 90% complete at the time it was canceled. Although the game's levels were "mostly finalized", the final area of the game, Makuta's lair, was unfinished; as of the game's final build, the player faces platforming segments based on each of the Toa's elements, but a final battle with Makuta is absent. The names of the elemental monsters had also not been decided on, with only the first one, the earth elemental Vatuka-Nui, having a name. According to Farshtey, the game was also intended to include a battle with the shadow Toa, dark counterparts of the Toa created by Makuta who would ultimately be defeated by the Toa.

== Aftermath and legacy ==
Already facing severe financial difficulties, the cancellation of The Legend of Mata Nui proved to be a fatal blow for Saffire. The company laid off many of their employees after it was canceled, ceased developing games in 2004, and shuttered in 2007. Despite the game's cancellation, it left a mark on the series in its visual representation of the villages of Mata Nui; Aron Gerencser of Quillstreak said that the similarities between the game's village designs and later iterations of them in the Bionicle series were "so similar to how it appears in the [Legend of Mata Nui] Alpha that the similarity cannot be a coincidence" and that Templar Studios, the developers of the Mata Nui Online Game, were given the game's assets in development, meaning that even in cancellation the game had "left a significant and lasting mark on the franchise".

In the years following its cancellation, the game became of interest to Bionicle fans in part due to its strong marketing campaign; Grenscer described The Legend of Mata Nui as being "something of a holy grail" for the Bionicle fan community. Of particular importance was its potential inclusion of the Toa's climactic battle with the Makuta, which lacked representation in the official Bionicle canon. Several developments were made in the 2000s towards discovering the game, aided in part by the development team having created copies of the game before they left. In 2004, an owner of one of these discs, an anonymous user on Mask of Destiny going by the name "Deep Brick", posted images of the game's first level to the site. Deep Brick later released footage from the game in 2010, but interest in the topic waned following the cancellation of the Bionicle line in 2010.

=== Discovery and fan re-release ===
In February 2018, an alpha build of The Legend of Mata Nui from July 2001 was sent by an unknown source to the BioMedia Project, a group of Bionicle fans, archivists, and coders who wanted to rework and finish the game. The group posted a download link online and hosted a livestream through YouTube community The Beaverhouse showcasing its gameplay. A beta build dated to October 23, 2001, was recovered by video game historian Liam Robertson. The various versions of the game differed in the amount of gameplay and story content, with the beta builds having superior performance and graphical quality and the alpha builds containing most of the game's story content. To develop and release a completed version of the game, The Beaverhouse created Litestone Studios, an independent game studio. According to Liam Scott, who leads the restoration effort, the group had been told by sources within Lego that no action would be taken against them provided the game was not distributed for profit.

Upon initial examination of the game's two builds, Litestone found that they were unplayable on modern computer hardware and would only work on a Voodoo2 GPU, which was uncommon even at the time it was being developed. The group worked to make it compatible with modern operating systems as well as to reconcile the different versions into a completed game, aiming to complete it as close to Saffire's original vision as possible. The group also plans to create the game's missing final boss battle with Makuta, drawing influence from his depiction in the Mata Nui Online Game where he is depicted as a Matoran who becomes "an evil swirling mass of LEGO Technic parts". Litestone has said their remake "shouldn’t even be considered a new game" and that it only "sets out to continue and expand" the original game. Version 1.0 of the Litestone Studios release of the game, titled Bionicle: The Legend of Mata Nui Rebuilt, was released online for download on August 10, 2019.
