= The Mask of Zorro (video game) =

1999 video game

- Developer: Saffire
- Producer: Sunsoft
- Platform: Game Boy Color
- Release: December 1999
- Genre: Platformer
- Mode: Single-player

The Mask of Zorro is a 1999 Game Boy Color platform game developed by Saffire and published by Sunsoft, based upon and following the plot of the 1998 movie of the same name.

== Gameplay ==
A screenshot of The Mask of Zorro.

In line with the plot of the film, Zorro, the player controls Zorro and his protégé Alejandro Murrieta to defeat Don Rafael in 1821 California. The game is a side-scrolling platformer spanning 30 levels, including churches, mansions, and mines. Gameplay consists of combat involving thrusting, slashing, and parrying with a sword, and navigating platforms and obstacles, including swinging across posts.

== Reception ==
Reception

Review scores
Publication	Score
AllGame	1/5
GameSpot	3.5
IGN	2/10
Game Boy Xtreme	40%
Nintendo Official Magazine	60%
Nintendo Pro	60%

Zorro received uniformly negative reviews, with critics noting the game was a poor-quality licensed platform game that had difficult controls. Writing for Allgame, Jon Thompson dismissed the game as an "absolute failure", noting main gameplay features were "so hopelessly flawed that they make (the game) unplayable", including the "difficult enemies and horrible control". Frank Provo of GameSpot labelled the game as a "poor movie adaptation" with "horrible control and boring gameplay", singling out the "horrid jump mechanics and poor collision detection". Nintendo Official Magazine described the game as "poor to look at and very frustrating". Alec Matias of IGN stated the game was "shameful" and a "prime example of how bad a Game Boy game could be", with the "biggest complaint (being) the control...the jump is totally awkward...you'll often miss and be forced to traverse half the level to try it again".
