= Ten Pin Alley 2 =

2004 video game

- Developer(s): Pronto Games (GBA); Other Ocean Interactive (Wii)
- Publisher(s): XS Games
- Platform(s): Game Boy Advance, Wii
- Release: NA: April 26, 2004 (GBA); NA: October 22, 2008 (Wii)
- Genre(s): Sports
- Mode(s): Single player

Ten Pin Alley 2 is a ten-pin bowling simulation video game by American studio Pronto Games, published by XS Games and released on the Game Boy Advance platform and later for the Wii. It is the sequel to the game Ten Pin Alley, but was not developed or published by the same company.

== Gameplay ==
The game functions similarly to its predecessor Ten Pin Alley, but offers players a stripped down and simplified version of the original, making the game less about the physics of ten-pin bowling and more about an enjoyable arcade game.

Ten Pin Alley 2 has two gameplay modes, a practice mode and a tournament mode. The game contains eight of its characteristically humorous bowlers, and four alleys.

The player controls position, power, placement and hook.

== Critical response ==
Reception

Aggregate score
Aggregator	Score
Metacritic	30% (Wii)

Review score
Publication	Score
IGN	4/10 (GBA); 2/10 (Wii)

Response to the game was poor. As of 2020, the Wii version holds a 30% Metacritic rating reflecting "generally unfavorable reviews".

Worthplaying questioned the necessity of a release on the Wii platform, and were particularly scathing in regards to the game's sound. Review site Game Chronicles criticised the game's graphical capabilities and rendering, calling it "outdated".
