= Animaniacs: Ten Pin Alley =

1998 video game

- North American PlayStation cover art
- Developer: Saffire
- Publisher: ASC Games
- Composer: Eric Nunamaker
- Platform: PlayStation
- Release: NA: December 4, 1998
- Genre: Sports (Bowling)
- Modes: Single-player, multiplayer

Animaniacs: Ten Pin Alley is a bowling video game released for the PlayStation in 1998. It is based on the 1996 video game Ten Pin Alley and, in turn, the animated television series of the same name, on the same system. A Nintendo 64 version was planned, but was cancelled because of the limitations of the N64 texture cache.

== Gameplay ==
In the opening cutscene, an invitation is delivered to the Warner Siblings in their water tower saying that they are invited to go bowling and that it's in 3D. They get excited about this and immediately jump out of the water tower. Just as the sibs are running, they are transformed into 3D characters. Wakko then says, "No, wait! I wanna do it again!" Then the scene shifts to ACME Labs, where Pinky and the Brain just found out about the bowling tournament in the newspaper. Yet once again, Brain believes that bowling will mean taking over the world. Pinky then laughs with delight and spins around in circles.

Animaniacs: Ten Pin Alley has three levels the player can choose from. The player can also choose styles of scoring, alley, and play style. The character chosen can also be adjusted by appearance, ball weight, and ball cover. There is also an option whether to have bumpers or no bumpers on the lane. If any of the characters bowl the ball properly, it will have special powers.

If the player chooses to play a tournament, they must defeat each opponent to progress to the next round or face elimination. Along the way, various cutscenes play alternating between the Brain creating a hypnotic bowling ball that will put the whole in his power, and the Goodfeathers planning on betting on the winner and making a killing. If the player wins, that character is shown being awarded the trophy; if Brain wins, his plan is to have Pinky bring out the ball to hypnotize everybody; unfortunately, Pinky had it bronzed as a memento of winning, effectively foiling the plot. If a different character wins, the Brain's invention of a body that allows him to bowl backfires, and it chases him and Pinky around and out of the bowling alley, while the birds also flee for their lives (although the reason for this is not shown). The scene then shows the winning character being awarded the trophy.

== Reception ==
Reception

Review scores
Publication	Score
AllGame	2/5
Electronic Gaming Monthly	6.125/10 (Note: Electronic Gaming Monthly's review was by four critics, all of whom gave it a 6/10 except for one that gave it a 6.5/10.)
IGN	7.1/10
Official U.S. PlayStation Magazine	3/5
PlayStation: The Official Magazine	3/5

Animaniacs: Ten Pin Alley got 7.1 out of 10 from IGN, who criticized its difficulty.
