= Xena: Warrior Princess: The Talisman of Fate =

1999 video game

- North American cover art
- Developer: Saffire
- Publisher: Titus Interactive
- Designers: Steven H. Taylor; Walter Park; Alan Tew
- Artists: Walter Park; Shane Olson; Alan Tew; Ryan Wood; Lauriann Wakefield
- Composer: Eric Nunamaker
- Platform: Nintendo 64
- Release: NA: December 6, 1999; PAL: December 17, 1999
- Genre: Fighting
- Modes: Single-player, multiplayer

Xena: Warrior Princess: The Talisman of Fate is a 1999 fighting game developed by Saffire and published by Titus Interactive for the Nintendo 64. It is based on the television series, Xena: Warrior Princess, which aired from 1995 to 2001.

== Gameplay ==
Graphics and gameplay

The player chooses from the cast of characters and then, in a random order, fights the other characters (including the player's character). Xena will usually appear as the sub-boss. The final boss is Despair, a character original to the game, who is Dahak's champion. After defeating Despair, the player's character's individual ending will take place, with varying dialogue depending on the difficulty selected. The game also has a roster mode, where the player selects a team of up to five characters and enters a free-for-all against other teams. Also, players can arrange teams and fight against other teams. Each character has their own special moves (such as Xena's chakram and Callisto's fire blast), and is able to perform weapon combos, after which Xena may shout either "wow" or "excellent", or the crowd may boo.

== Reception ==
Reception

Aggregate score
Aggregator	Score
GameRankings	61%

Review scores
Publication	Score
AllGame	3/5
CNET Gamecenter	4/10
Consoles +	83%
EP Daily	6/10
Game Informer	3.5/10
GameFan	77%
GameSpot	2.8/10
Hyper	77%
IGN	7.4/10
Next Generation	2/5
Nintendo Power	6.8/10

The game received mixed reviews according to the review aggregation website GameRankings.

Matt Casamassina of IGN wrote that the game's graphics were "highly detailed and varied." Casamassina also wrote that the game's 3D polygonal characters "look right on par with their television counterparts. Meanwhile, the game's 3D arenas, also modeled after recognizable locations from the show, look splendid with crisp textures, animated background effects and lots of variation." Casamassina also praised the game's camera system and "super smooth framerate", but criticized the fact that none of the actors from the television series lent their voices to the game.

Casamassina was also disappointed that the characters only had "roughly a handful of special moves" each, and noted that "some of the character animation is a bit awkward looking. Xena and friends move almost too fast at times and some moves come off as robotic and stiff." Casamassina concluded that the game "is a surprisingly good fighter that brings the license to Nintendo 64 in top form. Featuring a remarkable 3D engine, pretty graphics and an outstanding four-player mode to boot, the game has a lot to offer and does its best to disprove the theory that all licensed videogames are doomed to be poor. But at the same time, the game fails to deliver a long, challenging quest with only 11 playable characters and arenas to choose from and a simplistic (though fun) fighting engine that's just not very deep."

Doug Trueman of GameSpot wrote, "Almost everything in this game is done poorly, except the music - but twice while playing this title (the final, retail version, mind you) the sound effects and musical score cut out completely at the end of a match for no reason. Restarting the game is the only way to resurrect the audio." Trueman criticized the game's "atrocious" collision detection and "awful" animation, but noted its "well-drawn" backgrounds.

GamePro's The Freshman wrote in one review, "The fairly-simple models don't move as well as they look," and noted "the various moves and attacks suffer from a bit of jerkiness." The author also wrote, "Good music and various battle-sounds pepper the battlefield, but they're clobbered by annoying shrieks, grunts and oomphs." They noted the game's "fairly good four-player beat-em-up", but described each character's special moves as "awkward and slow to use". (Note: GamePro gave the game two 4/5 scores for graphics and sound, and two 3.5/5 scores for control and overall fun factor in one review.) In another review, Miss Spell concluded, "Overall, the experience is frustrating. Even given the slim lineup of N64 fighting games, Talisman isn't your best fate." (Note: GamePro gave the game two 3/5 scores for graphics and overall fun factor, and two 2.5/5 scores for sound and control in another review.)

Scott Alan Marriott of AllGame wrote, "The most compelling aspects of the game are its graphics, tight control and ability to support up to four players at once, with the latter feature almost worth the price of admission alone." Marriott praised the music and some of the voiceover work, but said the sound effects "seem muffled." Marriott also praised the game's detailed environments, and wrote, "All the characters are recognizable as their television counterparts, which is a far cry from the blurry, grainy graphics of other fighting titles on the system. While there is some blockiness and rough edges here and there, the polygonal models are quite good and make you believe you are fighting with the stars of the series".

Marriott was disappointed that "more freedom wasn't given to the player to pick up objects, climb more than just walls or negotiate other elements that could have spiced up the action. Another area of improvement would involve increasing the number of moves offered to each character. Aside from the basic slashes and kicks, there isn't much depth involved in the fighting system". Marriott wrote "there aren't enough features or options to keep you occupied after going through the Quest mode a few times," although he praised the multiplayer mode, saying the game "almost becomes an entirely new experience with three of your friends playing along."

Jeff Lundrigan of NextGen wrote that The Talisman of Fate was "Not a bad fighting game, hampered by sloppy mechanics, which uses its license either well or badly depending on your level of fandom."
