= Ten Pin Alley =

1996 video game

- North American PlayStation Box Art
- Developer: Adrenalin Entertainment
- Publisher: ASC Games
- Platforms: PlayStation; Saturn; Windows; PlayStation Network
- Release: PlayStation: NA: November 28, 1996; PAL: June 1997; Saturn: NA: October 30, 1997; Windows: NA: May 1, 1997; PlayStation Network: NA: August 13, 2009
- Genre: Sports game
- Modes: Single-player, multiplayer

This game is not to be confused with the similarly titled Animaniacs: Ten Pin Alley, which was developed by Saffire.

Ten Pin Alley is a ten-pin bowling simulation game released by ASC Games in 1996 and developed internally at Adrenalin Entertainment.

The game was released on November 28, 1996 in North America, and eventually released in February 1998 in the United Kingdom. Just before its North American release, Sony selected the game's demo to be included on its PlayStation sampler disc.

A sequel to the game entitled Ten Pin Alley 2, by an unknown developer, was mooted for a release on the PlayStation 2, but for unknown reasons was shelved. The sequel, developed by Pronto Games and published by XS Games, was released on the Game Boy Advance to dismal reviews.

Ten Pin Alley should not be confused with an audio game with the same title made by PCS Games.

== Gameplay ==
Players choose from a set of characters, each with their own strengths and weaknesses. The game play modes are single player, multiplayer, tournament and practice.

Each shot is controlled in a similar fashion to many of the golf games of the era: with an accuracy based pendulum system. With this the player decides the power, accuracy and hook for each shot.

== Critical response ==
Reception

Aggregate score
Aggregator	Score
GameRankings	73% (PS)

Review scores
Publication	Score
Electronic Gaming Monthly	8.5/10 (PS)
GameSpot	7.9/10 (PS)
Next Generation	4/5 (PS)
Official U.S. PlayStation Magazine	3/5

Response to the game was favorable. Critics applauded the accurate and realistic physics, the mechanics for controlling the ball's release, and the humorous behavior of the bowlers. Some critics remarked that the multiplayer capabilities, in combination with its other positive aspects, make Ten Pin Alley an ideal party video game. Next Generation, for example, called it "the perfect party game, with multiplayer capabilities, wacky characters, and solid game mechanics." GamePro summarized, "Striking sparks into the world of bowling, Ten Pin Alley delivers enough fun per frame to be recognized as the kingpin of its sport." Dean Hager of Electronic Gaming Monthly commented, "Despite its cheesy atmosphere and goof-ball characters, this sleeper-hit delivers an accurate and entertaining bowling game to the 32-bit platform." GameSpot deemed it "more fun than real bowling."

GamePro assessed the Saturn version as inferior to the PlayStation version, elaborating that "Although the [Saturn version] contains new camera angles, the alleys and bowlers don't look as cleanly animated as they do in the PlayStation version." However, they considered it a recommended title for Saturn owners due to its strong gameplay.

Ten Pin Alley was inducted into the International Bowling Hall of Fame in 1997, with an exhibit including an interactive kiosk.
