= Billy Bob's Huntin'-n-Fishin' =

1999 video game

- Developer: Saffire
- Publisher: Midway Games
- Platform: Game Boy Color
- Release: 1999
- Genre: Action
- Mode: Single-player

Billy Bob's Huntin'-n-Fishin is a 1999 video game developed by Saffire and published by Midway Games for the Game Boy Color. As Billy Bob, players undertake a range of activities including hunting, fishing and shooting, supported by several minigames. Upon release, the game received mixed reviews, with critics faulting the simplistic gameplay and the redneck theme of the title.

== Gameplay ==
Gameplay screenshot of the game's hunting mode.

As Billy Bob, players undertake a series of tasks to win the affections of romantic interest Daisy Mae, including hunting, fishing and shooting. The game features ten levels of hunting and fishing, and eight separate minigames over four sports. Hunting requires the player to explore the level to find paw prints from the relevant animal, and select them to enter a shooting minigame; if the right animal is hit, the player succeeds, but if the wrong animal is hit, the player loses a life and must start over. In the fishing minigame, players find a location on the lake in the level and cast their reel, waiting for a fish to catch the hook. Some minigames complement the main game mode: for instance, players must hit targets in a carnival-style shooting range before earning bullets to begin hunting.

== Reception ==
Reception

Review scores
Publication	Score
AllGame	2/5
Electronic Gaming Monthly	3/10
Game Informer	3.75/10
IGN	5/10
N64 Magazine	3/10

Despite noting the game was one of the only hunting and fishing titles on the Game Boy, many critics felt the main game modes were simplistic and the weakest aspect of the game. Several critics also observed the main gameplay modes were merely extensions of earlier minigames. Jon Thompson of Allgame stated the game lacked "anything resembling a serious simulation" of those activities, and critiqued the "simple, repetitive nature" of the minigames as "less offensive than bland". Stating the game "just isn't worth the effort" for its "novelty factor", Electronic Gaming Monthly considered the mingames had "very little skill required". Craig Harris of IGN considered the minigames were "implemented well", stating that the game's overall redneck theme was "more embarrassing for the player than clever for the designer". N64 raised similar critiques, but considered the game to have a "warped sense of humor" despite its simplicity.
