= List of Bionicle media =

Bionicle
- Created by: Lego
- Owner: The Lego Group
- Years: 2001–2010, 2015–2016, 2023

Print publications
- Book: Bionicle books
- Comics: Bionicle comics

Films and television
- Film: Bionicle films
- Television series: The Journey to One (2016)

Games
- Video game: Bionicle video games

Audio
- Soundtrack: Bionicle film soundtracks

Aside from the toys in the Lego Bionicle franchise, Lego has also marketed a book series, several video games (mostly for the Game Boy Advance), and four animated movies which feature important plot points. A Bionicle comic book was also published by DC Comics and made available free to members of the Lego Club with some issues of the Lego Magazines. Some comic issues were also posted on the official Bionicle website, Bionicle.com. There are also various other ancillary products available, such as watches, toothbrushes, and backpacks, as well as online adventure games.

== Books ==
=== Novels ===
==== Bionicle Chronicles ====
No.	Title	Author	Publication date	ISBN
1	Tale of the Toa	Cathy Hapka	2003	ISBN 0-439-50116-4
2	Beware the Bohrok	Cathy Hapka	2003	ISBN 0-439-50117-2
3	Makuta's Revenge	Cathy Hapka	2003	ISBN 0-439-50119-9
4	Tales of the Masks	Greg Farshtey	2003	ISBN 0-439-60706-X
5	Mask of Light (Note: This novel was released as Bionicle Adventures #11 in Spanish markets.)	Cathy Hapka	2003	ISBN 0-439-50118-0

==== Bionicle Adventures ====
No.	Title	Author	Publication date	ISBN
1	Mystery of Metru Nui	Greg Farshtey	2004	ISBN 0-439-60731-0
2	Trial by Fire	Greg Farshtey	2004	ISBN 0-439-60732-9
3	The Darkness Below	Greg Farshtey	2004	ISBN 0-439-60733-7
4	Legends of Metru Nui	Greg Farshtey	2004	ISBN 0-439-62747-8
5	Voyage of Fear	Greg Farshtey	2004	ISBN 0-439-68022-0
6	Maze of Shadows	Greg Farshtey	2004	ISBN 0-439-68023-9
7	Web of the Visorak	Greg Farshtey	2005	ISBN 0-439-69619-4
8	Challenge of the Hordika	Greg Farshtey	2005	ISBN 0-439-69621-6
9	Web of Shadows	Greg Farshtey	2005	ISBN 0-439-74558-6
10	Time Trap	Greg Farshtey	2005	ISBN 0-439-74559-4

==== Bionicle Legends ====
No.	Title	Author	Publication date	ISBN
1	Island of Doom	Greg Farshtey	2006	ISBN 0-439-74560-8
2	Dark Destiny	Greg Farshtey	2006	ISBN 0-439-78795-5
3	Power Play	Greg Farshtey	2006	ISBN 0-439-82804-X
4	Legacy of Evil	Greg Farshtey	2006	ISBN 0-439-82807-4
5	Inferno	Greg Farshtey	2006	ISBN 0-439-82805-8
6	City of the Lost	Greg Farshtey	2007	ISBN 0-439-89033-0
7	Prisoners of the Pit	Greg Farshtey	2007	ISBN 0-439-89034-9
8	Downfall	Greg Farshtey	2007	ISBN 978-0-439-89037-3
9	Shadows in the Sky	Greg Farshtey	2008	ISBN 0-439-91641-0
10	Swamp of Secrets	Greg Farshtey	2008	ISBN 0-545-05416-8
11	The Final Battle	Greg Farshtey	2008	ISBN 0-545-08079-7

==== Bionicle Super Chapter Books ====
No.	Title	Author	Publication date	ISBN
1	Raid on Vulcanus	Greg Farshtey	2009	ISBN 0-545-10073-9
2	The Legend Reborn	Greg Farshtey	2009	ISBN 0-545-21417-3
3	Journey's End (Note: This novel was published exclusively in Poland. The English version was released online through the Bionicle website in instalments.)	Greg Farshtey	2010	ISBN 978-83-253-0629-8

==== Lego Bionicle ====
No.	Title	Author	Publication date	ISBN
1	Island of the Lost Masks	Ryder Windham	August 25, 2015	ISBN 978-0-545-87325-3
2	Revenge of the Skull Spiders	Ryder Windham	May 6, 2016	ISBN 978-0-545-90590-9
3	Escape from the Underworld	Ryder Windham	June 26, 2016	ISBN 978-0-545-92540-2

==== Collected ====
Title	Novels included	Author	Publication date	ISBN
Chronicles Collection	Chronicles #1–4	Cathy Hapka, Greg Farshtey	March 13, 2005	ISBN 0-7607-9511-8
Adventures: Volume 1	Adventures #1–3	Greg Farshtey	January 1, 2006	ISBN 0-7607-9603-3

=== Young Readers series ===
No.	Title	Author	Publication date	ISBN
1	Journey of Takanuva	Greg Farshtey	2008	ISBN 0-545-08214-5
2	The Secret of Certavus	Greg Farshtey	2009	ISBN 0-545-09336-8
3	Desert of Danger	Greg Farshtey	2009	ISBN 0-545-11542-6
4	Challenge of Mata Nui	Greg Farshtey	2009	ISBN 0-545-16209-2

=== Guidebooks ===
Title	Author	Publication date	ISBN
The Official Guide to Bionicle	Greg Farshtey	2003	ISBN 978-0-439-50115-6
Unmasked	Unknown	2003	
Metru Nui - City of Legends	Greg Farshtey	2004	ISBN 0-439-60734-5
Unmasked 2	Unknown	2004	
Rahi Beasts	Greg Farshtey	2005	ISBN 0-439-69622-4
Encyclopedia	Greg Farshtey	2005	ISBN 0-439-74561-6
Dark Hunters	Greg Farshtey	2006	ISBN 0-439-82803-1
World	Greg Farshtey	2007	ISBN 978-0-439-78796-3
Encyclopedia Updated	Greg Farshtey	2007	ISBN 978-0-439-91640-0
Makuta's Guide to the Universe	Greg Farshtey	2008	ISBN 978-83-253-0350-1
Mata Nui's Guide to Bara Magna	Greg Farshtey	2009	ISBN 978-83-253-0494-2
The Legend Reborn - Official Movie Guide	Greg Farshtey	2009	

=== Activity books ===
Title	Author	Publication date	ISBN
Collector's Sticker Book	Greg Farshtey	October 1, 2003	ISBN 0-439-50120-2
Guard the Secret	Unknown	August 7, 2006	ISBN 0-00-723186-5
Facts and Figures	Unknown	August 7, 2006	ISBN 0-00-723185-7
Annual	Unknown	September 4, 2006	ISBN 0-00-723262-4
Piraka	Unknown	December 6, 2006	ISBN 0-00-723431-7
Toa Inika	Unknown	December 6, 2006	ISBN 0-00-723432-5
Matoran	Unknown	December 6, 2006	ISBN 0-00-723434-1
Voya Nui	Unknown	December 6, 2006	ISBN 0-00-723435-X
Barraki	Unknown	August 6, 2007	ISBN 0-00-725438-5
Toa Mahri (edition 1)	Unknown	August 6, 2007	ISBN 0-00-723432-5
Toa Mahri (edition 2)	Unknown	August 6, 2007	ISBN 0-00-723434-1
Mahri Nui	Unknown	August 6, 2007	ISBN 2-8006-9611-7
Storyline Background	Unknown	2008	
Phantoka Makuta	Unknown	2008	
Mistika Toa Nuva	Unknown	2008	
Mistika Makuta	Unknown	2008	
Glatorian	Unknown	2009	ISBN 978-83-253-0494-2
Quests for the Masks of Power	Unknown	November 24, 2015	ISBN 978-0-545-87255-3

== Comics ==
=== Bionicle ===
No.	Title	Sub-series	Publication date	Writer	Artist
1	The Coming of the Toa (Note: Also known as Six Heroes One Destiny.)	N/A	June 2001	Greg Farshtey	Carlos D'Anda
2	Deep into Darkness (Note: Also known as Trapped... by the Rahi!)	N/A	July 2001	Greg Farshtey	Carlos D'Anda
3	Triumph of the Toa	N/A	October 2001	Greg Farshtey	Carlos D'Anda
4	The Bohrok Awake	The Bohrok Saga	January 2002	Greg Farshtey	Carlos D'Anda
5	To Trap a Tahnok	The Bohrok Saga	April 2002	Greg Farshtey	Carlos D'Anda
6	Into the Nest	The Bohrok Saga	May 2002	Greg Farshtey	Carlos D'Anda
7	What Lurks Below	The Bohrok Saga	July 2002	Greg Farshtey	Carlos D'Anda
8	The End of the Toa?	The Bohrok Saga	September 2002	Greg Farshtey	Carlos D'Anda
9	Divided We Fall	The Bohrok Saga	November 2002	Greg Farshtey	Carlos D'Anda
10	Powerless!	N/A	January 2003	Greg Farshtey	Randy Elliott
11	A Matter of Time...	N/A	March 2003	Greg Farshtey	Randy Elliott
12	Absolute Power	N/A	May 2003	Greg Farshtey	Randy Elliott
13	Rise of the Rahkshi!	N/A	July 2003	Greg Farshtey	Randy Elliott
14	At Last – Takanuva!	N/A	September 2003	Greg Farshtey	Randy Elliott
15	Secrets and Shadows	N/A	November 2003	Greg Farshtey	Randy Elliott
16	Toa Metru!	Metru Nui	January 2004	Greg Farshtey	Randy Elliott
17	Disks of Danger	Metru Nui	March 2004	Greg Farshtey	Randy Elliott
18	Seeds of Doom	Metru Nui	May 2004	Greg Farshtey	Randy Elliott
19	Enemies of Metru Nui	Metru Nui	July 2004	Greg Farshtey	Randy Elliott
20	Struggle in the Sky	Metru Nui	September 2004	Greg Farshtey	Randy Elliott
21	Dreams of Darkness	Metru Nui	November 2004	Greg Farshtey	Randy Elliott
22	Monsters in the Dark	Metru Nui	January 2005	Greg Farshtey	Randy Elliott
23	Vengeance of the Visorak	Metru Nui	March 2005	Greg Farshtey	Randy Elliott
24	Shadow Play (Note: Also known as Reign of Darkness.)	Metru Nui	May 2005	Greg Farshtey	Randy Elliott
25	Birth of the Rahaga	Metru Nui	July 2005	Greg Farshtey	Randy Elliott
26	Hanging by a Thread	Metru Nui	September 2005	Greg Farshtey	Randy Elliott
27	Fractures	Metru Nui	November 2005	Greg Farshtey	Randy Elliott

=== Ignition ===
No.	Title	Sub-series	Publication date	Writer	Artist
0	Ignition	N/A	January 2006	Greg Farshtey	Stuart Sayger
1	If a Universe Ends	N/A	March 2006	Greg Farshtey	Stuart Sayger
2	Vengeance of Axonn	N/A	May 2006	Greg Farshtey	Stuart Sayger
3	Showdown	N/A	July 2006	Greg Farshtey	Stuart Sayger
4	A Cold Light Dawns	N/A	September 2006	Greg Farshtey	Stuart Sayger
5	In Final Battle	N/A	November 2006	Greg Farshtey	Stuart Sayger
6	Ignition 6 (Note: Also known as Web Comic due to initially being released online.)	Sea of Darkness	January 2007	Greg Farshtey	Stuart Sayger
7	Mask of Life, Mask of Doom	Sea of Darkness	March 2007	Greg Farshtey	Stuart Sayger
8	Sea of Darkness	Sea of Darkness	May 2007	Greg Farshtey	Stuart Sayger
9	Battle in the Deep!	Sea of Darkness	July 2007	Greg Farshtey	Stuart Sayger
10	The Death of Mata Nui	Sea of Darkness	September 2007	Greg Farshtey	Stuart Sayger
11	Death of a Hero	Sea of Darkness	November 2007	Greg Farshtey	Stuart Sayger
12	Realm of Fear	Battle for Power	March 2008	Greg Farshtey	Leigh Gallagher
12.5	Comic 12.5	Battle for Power	May 2008	Greg Farshtey	Leigh Gallagher
13	Swamp of Shadows	Battle for Power	July 2008	Greg Farshtey	Leigh Gallagher
14	Endgame	Battle for Power	September 2008	Greg Farshtey	Leigh Gallagher
15	Mata Nui Rising	Battle for Power	November 2008	Greg Farshtey	Leigh Gallagher

=== Glatorian ===
No.	Title	Sub-series	Publication date	Writer	Artist
1	Sands of Bara Magna	N/A	January 2009	Greg Farshtey	Pop Mhan
2	The Fall of Atero	N/A	March 2009	Greg Farshtey	Pop Mhan
3	A Hero Reborn	N/A	July 2009	Greg Farshtey	Pop Mhan
4	Before the Storm	N/A	September 2009	Greg Farshtey	Pop Mhan
5	Valley of Fear	N/A	November 2009	Greg Farshtey	Pop Mhan
6	All That Glitters	Journey's End	January 2010	Greg Farshtey	Pop Mhan
7	Rebirth	Journey's End	March 2010	Greg Farshtey	Pop Mhan

=== Graphic novels ===
==== Bionicle ====
No.	Title	Comics included	Publication date	Writer	Artist(s)	ISBN
1	Rise of the Toa Nuva	Bionicle #1–8	June 10, 2008	Greg Farshtey	Carlos D'Anda, Randy Elliott	ISBN 1-59707-109-9
2	Challenge of the Rahkshi	Bionicle #9–15	August 5, 2008	Greg Farshtey	Randy Elliott	ISBN 1-59707-111-0
3	City of Legends	Bionicle #16–21	October 28, 2008	Greg Farshtey	Randy Elliott	ISBN 1-59707-121-8
4	Trial by Fire	Bionicle #22–27	January 20, 2009	Greg Farshtey	Randy Elliott	ISBN 1-59707-132-3
5	The Battle of Voya Nui	Ignition #1–5	May 12, 2009	Greg Farshtey	Stuart Sayger	ISBN 978-1-59707-145-1
6	The Underwater City	Ignition #6–11, Hydraxon's Tale	August 4, 2009	Greg Farshtey	Stuart Sayger	ISBN 978-1-59707-157-4
7	Realm of Fear	Ignition #12–15	November 24, 2009	Greg Farshtey	Leigh Gallagher	ISBN 978-1-59707-167-3
8	Legends of Bara Magna	Rise and Fall of the Skrall; The Exile's Tale; All Our Sins Remembered	June 8, 2010	Greg Farshtey	Christian Zanier, Stuart Sayger	ISBN 1-59707-180-3
9	The Fall of Atero	Glatorian #1–5	June 8, 2010	Greg Farshtey	Pop Mhan	ISBN 1-59707-194-3

- Two additional graphic novels, Power of the Great Beings and Journey's End, were planned but ultimately cancelled due to poor sales. They would have included the last two issues of the Glatorian comic series as well as new material.

==== Lego Bionicle ====
No.	Title	Publication date	Writer	Artist(s)	ISBN
1	Gathering of the Toa	December 29, 2015	Ryder Windham	Unknown	ISBN 978-0-316-26622-2
2	Battle of the Mask Makers	April 26, 2016	Ryder Windham	Unknown	ISBN 978-0-316-26623-9

==== Collected ====
Title	Comics included	Publication date	Writer	Artist(s)	ISBN
The Saga of Takanuva!	Bionicle #1, 9–15	2003	Greg Farshtey	Carlos D'Anda, Randy Elliott	N/A
Volume 1	Bionicle #1–15	August 2004	Greg Farshtey	Carlos D'Anda, Randy Elliott	ISBN 978-0-00-725515-3
Mahri Nui (Note: Released exclusively in China.)	Ignition #6–10	2007	Greg Farshtey	Stuart Sayger	N/A

== Films ==
Title	U.S. release date	Director	Screenwriter(s)	Production studio
Original trilogy
Bionicle: Mask of Light	September 16, 2003	Terry Shakespeare, David Molina	Alastair Swinnerton, Henry Gilroy, Greg Weisman	Creative Capers Entertainment
Bionicle 2: Legends of Metru Nui	October 19, 2004	Terry Shakespeare, David Molina	Henry Gilroy, Greg Klein, Tom Pugsley and Elliot Gabrel	Creative Capers Entertainment
Bionicle 3: Web of Shadows	October 11, 2005	Terry Shakespeare, David Molina	Brett Matthews	Creative Capers Entertainment
Stand-alone film
Bionicle: The Legend Reborn	September 15, 2009	Mark Baldo	Sean Catherine Derek and Greg Farshtey (story)	Threshold Animation Studios

- A film based on Bionicle's 2001 storyline was planned prior to the franchise's launch, but never reached production.
- The Legend Reborn was originally planned as the first film in a new trilogy, but its sequels were scrapped following Bionicle's discontinuation as a toy line. A screen treatment for what would've been the second film was released online.

=== Soundtracks ===
Title	Release date	Length	Composer(s)	Label
Bionicle: Mask of Light - Original Score Soundtrack (14th Anniversary Release)	March 10, 2017	1:06:27	Nathan Furst	Rising Phoenix Records
Bionicle 2: Legends of Metru Nui - Original Score Soundtrack	December 12, 2017	0:57:27	Nathan Furst	Rising Phoenix Records
Bionicle 3: Web of Shadows - Original Score Soundtrack	December 22, 2017	1:05:43	Nathan Furst	Rising Phoenix Records

== TV series ==
Series	Season	Episodes	Originally released			Showrunner(s)
Series	Season	Episodes	First released	Last released	Network	Showrunner(s)
Lego Bionicle: The Journey to One	1	4 (+ 1 prologue)	March 4, 2016	July 29, 2016	Netflix	Mathieu Boucher, Jean-Fraçois Tremblay

== Video games ==
=== Console ===
Title	U.S. release date	Publisher	Developer	Platforms
Lego Bionicle: Quest for the Toa	October 2, 2001	Lego Software	Saffire	Game Boy Advance
Bionicle: Matoran Adventures	October 16, 2002	Electronic Arts, Lego Interactive	Argonaut Games	Game Boy Advance
Bionicle (Note: Also known as Bionicle: The Game.)	September 10, 2003 (GBA); October 20, 2003 (NGC, PS2, Xbox); October 28, 2003 (PC)	Electronic Arts, Lego Interactive, THQ (GBA), Feral Interactive (OS X)	Argonaut Games, Argonaut Sheffield, Möbius Entertainment (GBA)	Game Boy Advance, GameCube, Mac OS X, Microsoft Windows, PlayStation 2, Xbox
Bionicle: Maze of Shadows	March 24, 2005	THQ	Razorback Developments	Game Boy Advance
Bionicle Heroes	November 14, 2006; April 24, 2007 (Wii)	Eidos Interactive, TT Games Publishing	Traveller's Tales, Amaze Entertainment (handheld), Universomo (J2ME)	Game Boy Advance, GameCube, J2ME, Nintendo DS, Microsoft Windows, PlayStation 2, Xbox 360, Wii

==== Canceled ====
Title	Intended U.S. release date	Publisher	Developer	Platforms
Lego Bionicle: The Legend of Mata Nui	December 2001	Lego Software	Saffire	GameCube, Microsoft Windows
Bionicle: City of Legends	Late 2004	Lego Interactive	Argonaut Games	N/A

=== Online ===
Title	Release date	Developer	Notes
Mata Nui Online Game	January 1–December 15, 2001	Templar Studios	Released episodically as 9 "chapters", documenting the 2001 Bionicle storyline.
Let the Legend Begin	2001	Unknown	Promotional.
Atticmedia	2001	Unknown	Promotional.
Huai Snowball Sling	2001	Argonaut Games	Originally released in the console game Lego Bionicle: Quest for the Toa before being released online. Also included on interactive demo CDs released with select 2001 Bionicle toy sets.
Mata Nui Explorer (original)	2002	Unknown	
The Battle of Mata Nui	2003	Unknown	Originally intended for a 2002 release before getting was pushed back to 2003 due to technical problems.
Mata Nui Online Game II: The Final Chronicle	May 29, 2003–January 9, 2004	Templar Studios	Released episodically as 7 "chapters" documenting part of the 2003 Bionicle storyline.
Mata Nui Explorer (Mask of Light edition)	2003	Unknown	Promotion for the film Bionicle: Mask of Light (2003).
Toa Personality Test	2003	Unknown	Personality quiz. Promotion for the film Bionicle: Mask of Light (2003).
The Legend Continues	2003	Unknown	Promotion for the film Bionicle: Mask of Light (2003). Written by Greg Farshtey.
Lava Surfing	2003	Unknown	Promotion for the film Bionicle: Mask of Light (2003).
Onua's Memory Challenge	2003	Unknown	Promotion for the film Bionicle: Mask of Light (2003).
Kopaka's Ice Trail	2003	Unknown	Promotion for the film Bionicle: Mask of Light (2003).
Pohatu's Matching Pairs	2003	Unknown	Promotion for the film Bionicle: Mask of Light (2003).
Gali Nuva's Rapid Descent	2003	Unknown	Promotion for the film Bionicle: Mask of Light (2003).
Forest Flyer	2003	Unknown	Promotion for the film Bionicle: Mask of Light (2003).
Stop the Morbuzakh!	2004	Spike Ltd.	
Which Toa Are You?	2004	Unknown	Personality quiz.
Bionicle: Colgate	2004	Unknown	Promotion by Colgate.
Rhotuka Spinner Challenge	2005	Unknown	
Battle Zone	2005	Unknown	Promotion by Neopets.
Draw a Piraka	2006	Unknown	Promotional.
Piraka Attack	2006	IMBstudio, Mind Orchard	
Island Investigation	2006	Unknown	Promotional.
Voya Nui Adventure	2006	Unknown	Promotional.
Voya Nui Online Game	2006	Ankama Studio	
Matoran Escape	2006	Unknown	
Inika Assault	2006	Tanukidesign	
Barraki teaser game	2007	Unknown	
Creeps from the Deep	2007	Unknown	
Sea Survival	2007	Unknown	Promotion by Jetix.
Barraki	2007	Unknown	
Mahri: Hewkii	2007	Unknown	Promotion by Jetix.
Command Toa Hewkii	2007	4t2 Studios	Connected series.
Command Toa Hahli	2007	4t2 Studios	Connected series.
Command Toa Kongu	2007	4t2 Studios	Connected series.
Command Toa Jaller	2007	4t2 Studios	Connected series.
Command Toa Nuparu	2007	4t2 Studios	Connected series.
Command Toa Matoro	2007	4t2 Studios	Connected series.
Command the Toa Mahri - The Final Challenge	2007	4t2 Studios	Connected series.
Battle for Power	2008	Unknown	Set of 10 games.
Mistika	2008	Unknown	
Mistika: Swamp of Secrets	2008	Unknown	Promotion by YTV. Set of 4 games.
My Lego Network Bionicle campaign	2009	Unknown	Promotion by My Lego Network.
Glatorian Arena	2009	Serious Games Interactive	
Prepare for Battle	2009	Unknown	Promotion by YTV.
Glatorian Arena 2	2009	Serious Games Interactive	
Sands of Time	2009	Unknown	Promotion by Disney XD.
Glatorian Arena 3	2009	Serious Games Interactive	
Agori Defender	2010	Unknown	

=== Mobile ===
Title	U.S. release date	Publisher	Developer	Platforms
Bionicle Challenge	2006	Living Mobile	Kiloo	Mobile devices
Bionicle Defenders	2007	Disney Mobile	Kiloo	Mobile devices
Bionicle: Mask of Creation	January 1, 2015	The Lego Group	Frima Studio	Android and iOS devices
Bionicle: Mask of Control	January 19, 2016	The Lego Group	Frima Studio	Android and iOS devices

== Trading card game ==
During the first year of the BIONICLE toyline, in 2001, McDonald's distributed packets of cards with their 'kids' meals. There were five cards in each one: four regular, and one holographic or "special" card. The packet came with a mini comic that had an instruction booklet telling the person how to play the game. There was another card game that was sold (instead of collected, like the above) which included a board along with other accessories to play the game.

In 2008 LEGO also distributed the "Phantoka Trading Card Game", which were given away for free in little packages which included about six trading cards with a picture and information of one of the Toa Nuva, Makuta, Av-Matoran or Shadow Matoran. The package also included one holographic card, which featured the combination of a Phantoka and a Matoran. The packages were given away for free in many toy stores in Europe if bought in a Phantoka set.

== Music ==
Composers Paul Hardcastle and Simon Fuller produced the music for the Bionicle commercials used between 2001 and 2004, which also featured in the Mata Nui Online Game released throughout 2001. An official Bionicle album – featuring music from the bands Cold and Woven and singers Rob Zombie and Kenna – from was originally planned for release in 2002, but the project was scrapped when disagreements arose between the Lego Group and the label Interscope Records.

In 2005, the band All Insane Kids released the songs "Hero" and "Caught in a Dream", produced and written by Morten Krog Helgesen. The latter is played in the end credits of Bionicle 3: Web of Shadows. Between 2006 and 2007, artists such as The All-American Rejects, Daughtry and Niels Brinck contributed songs for Bionicle commercials, but the success of the song "Creeping in My Soul", sung by Danish singer Christine Lorentzen for Bionicle's Barraki toy campaign, led to the formation of the rock band Cryoshell, who produced music for the theme up until its original discontinuation, and in its wake released their self-titled debut album.

Music for the first three Bionicle films – Mask of Light (2003), Legends of Metru Nui (2004) and Web of Shadows (2005) – was composed by Nathan Furst. Soundtracks for all three films were digitally released in 2017. Music for the fourth film The Legend Reborn (2009) was composed by John D'Andrea, while Mike Raznick scored the 2016 series Lego Bionicle: The Journey to One.

== Miscellaneous ==
Besides the films, books, comics etc., there are other ways parts of the Generation 1 story have been told. Much of this content is now available on the unofficial BioMedia Project website.

=== Reading materials ===
Bionicle.com had some information about parts of the Generation 1 story, including some character biographies.

BionicleStory.com had several sections containing information about the Generation 1 characters, locations, and more. Among the offerings were also story serials and "blog" chapters, the latter being each one or two pages of story text styled as a journal entry from one of the fictional Bionicle characters.

=== Audio ===
Bionicle.com had two downloadable MP3s (as well as two PDF files with the "lyrics" to the MP3s) that describe the rise the giant robotic body of Mata Nui out of its slumber and his exile from said body when Makuta Teridax took it over in the Generation 1 plotline.

BionicleStory.com also had many podcasts recorded by Bionicle writer Greg Farshtey available for download in the "Latest Story" area of the site that tell much of the Generation 1 story.

On the homepage for Bionicle.com, there was a collection of audio recordings, called the Mata Nui Saga, that told some of Mata Nui's story. Each one had a picture, text, and music with it. They were split into thirty-four "chapters", each narrated in-character by Michael Dorn (reprising his role of Mata Nui from The Legend Reborn).

There were also downloadable songs and other things on the website that were inspired by different sections of the Generation 1 storyline.
