= Rustbound =

Upcoming video game

- Developer: Unmasked Games
- Engine: Unreal Engine
- Platform: Windows
- Genre: Action role-playing
- Mode: Single-player

Rustbound is an upcoming action role-playing video game created by Unmasked Games (formerly known as Team Kanohi). The game was originally known by the name Bionicle: Masks of Power and was a fan game based on the Bionicle line of toys by Lego. Trailers for the game were received positively, with critics praising its visuals and comparing its combat to Devil May Cry and Nier: Automata.

On May 17, 2025, it was announced that the project had shut down, following a request from The Lego Group with which the developers complied. Following the game's cancellation, Team Kanohi changed their name to Unmasked Games and began working on remaking the game under the name Rustbound with an original story and setting.

== Gameplay ==
The initial version of the game, Masks of Power, was an open world game that included platform elements and puzzles, with overworld movements affected by the powers of the Kanohi masks the Toa collect. According to project director ASCII, the primary inspirations for Masks of Power are Nier: Automata and Monster Hunter, which influenced the combat and enemy design, respectively. Project creator Jordan Willis also cited Horizon: Zero Dawn as an inspiration, calling it "basically Bionicle without the trademark". The game is made using Unreal Engine.

== Development ==
=== Bionicle: Masks of Power ===
Prior to rebranding, the project was known as Bionicle: Masks of Power.

As of October 2021, the game's development team consisted of around 38 volunteers. The development team is international, with team members residing across multiple time zones. Team Kanohi previously released Masks of Power: Legacy, which project director ASCII described as "mostly a prototype" of Masks of Power. Masks of Power was not sanctioned by Lego. According to ASCII, Lego provided Team Kanohi with a list of "rules and guidelines" for presenting the game; as long as these guidelines are followed, Lego said that they took a "laid-back" approach to fan games.

Team Kanohi released a gameplay trailer in August 2022, showcasing the game's enemy behavior, different weapons in combat, and Kanohi mask powers. Michael Cripe of The Escapist felt the trailer was "so impressive that it might as well be an officially licensed Lego product". Otto Kratky of Digital Trends dubbed it "fantastic", noting the variety of environments and creatures "faithful" to original Bionicle set builds. On August 10, 2023, a new trailer for the game was released featuring a Bionicle-themed song, "As Above So Below", by artists Essenger and Danish rock band Cryoshell. The trailer showcased some of the game's combat; according to Harvey Randall of PC Gamer, it showed "DMC-style flips, fancy evasion tech, air-juggling, and distinct move-sets between the two Toa shown", although Randall noted "performance issues" as well. The trailer stated a demo for the game was scheduled for release on Steam in early 2024.

The visual style of Bionicle: Masks of Power combined toy-accurate character and Rahi designs with realistic environments and scenery. Gray Fore of Screen Rant noted the game's visual similarities to the Mata Nui Online Game. The premise of the game centered around the six mighty Toa arriving on the island of Mata Nui, where they are tasked to find and collect powerful Kanohi masks in order to stop the evil force known as the Makuta, who has taken control of the Rahi animals to attack the Matoran villagers in all six elemental regions of the island. The game included elements taken from the original Bionicle canon, with revisions for parts that "won't make a good game" and filling in "gaps" in the story.

=== Rustbound ===
Development on Bionicle: Masks of Power ceased on May 17, 2025, after The Lego Group ordered that the game's development be shut down. Team Kanohi was renamed to Unmasked Games and refocused their efforts on remaking the game with an original story and setting. The new project was titled Rustbound. The first teaser trailer for Rustbound was released in August 2026.
