= Thunderbirds (2004 video game) =

2004 video game

- Cover art
- Developer: Saffire
- Publisher: Vivendi Universal Games
- Platform: Game Boy Advance
- Release: NA: 10 August 2004; EU: 20 August 2004
- Genres: Action, puzzle
- Mode: Single-player

Thunderbirds is a 2004 action game for the Game Boy Advance developed by Saffire and published by Vivendi Universal Games, licensed from the Thunderbirds franchise and based on the film of the same name.

== Gameplay ==
A screenshot of Thunderbirds, depicting the puzzle gameplay.

Thunderbirds contains two core modes of play over nine missions. The first, described as a "Lost Vikings-style co-operative action game", involves players clearing puzzles by controlling three characters from a top-down perspective to manipulate obstacles. Each of the three playable characters use special abilities in order to reach switches or open up a path to progress the level: Alan can jump over gaps and move crates, Tin-Tin can jump and move things with telekinesis, and Fermat can hack computers and move through ventilation shafts. The second mode features brief sections of shoot 'em up action gameplay in which the player pilots the International Rescue fleet of Thunderbirds whilst avoiding and shooting enemies.

== Reception ==
Reception

Review scores
| Publication | Score |
|---|---|
| AllGame | 2/5 |
| GameZone | 5.1/10 |
| IGN | 5/10 |
| Cube | 2.0/10 |
| Nintendo Official Magazine UK | 40% |
| Evening Standard | 1/5 |

Thunderbirds received negative reviews, with publications critiquing the game's poor puzzle design. Dismissing the game as "the worst shooter you've ever seen", Electronic Gaming Monthly critiqued Thunderbirds as a "bad licensed game" as the product of an "uninspired development team". The magazine particularly found fault in the game's puzzles, stating "Thunderbirds' puzzles take seconds to solve and a lifetime to finish", due to "hours of backtracking and character switching" to complete simple puzzles. Cube recommended readers not to purchase the game, stating that Thunderbirds featured the "clumsiest, most cumbersome (control) system...the mechanics are there, but it's just such an utter waste of time." Writing for Nintendo Official Magazine, Rob Burman similarly expressed frustration with the puzzle mechanics in the game due to their "startlingly similar levels", whilst noting that the action levels "are slightly more terrible...the missions range from dull to beyond boring". Craig Harris for IGN critiqued the puzzle designs, stating that "characters only have a couple of attributes that set themselves apart from each other, which means puzzle designs are just variations of the same "shove crate, hit switch, roll through vent, hack computer" idea."
