= Lego Bionicle: Quest for the Toa =

2001 video game

- Developer(s): Saffire
- Publisher(s): Lego Software
- Director(s): Mark Livingstone
- Producer(s): Jeff James
- Designer(s): Dave Rushton; Sam Nielson
- Programmer(s): Jay Rushton
- Artist(s): Sam Nielson
- Writer(s): Jeff James; Alastair Swinnerton
- Composer(s): Lance LeVar
- Series: Bionicle
- Platform(s): Game Boy Advance
- Release: NA: October 2, 2001; EU: October 26, 2001
- Genre(s): Action-adventure
- Mode(s): Single-player, multiplayer

Lego Bionicle: Quest for the Toa (also known as Lego Bionicle and originally titled Lego Bionicle: Tales of the Tohunga) is a 2001 action-adventure game developed by Saffire and published by Lego Software for the Game Boy Advance. Based on the Lego Group's Bionicle line of constructible action figures, the game follows Takua, a villager on the island of Mata Nui, on a quest to rescue the island's Turaga elders and summon the Toa, heroic elemental warriors destined to defeat the evil Makuta.

The game incorporates elements of platform games and takes an isometric perspective; the player traverses through 20 levels, divided among the six elementally-themed regions of the island of Mata Nui. After completing each world, a minigame is unlocked that can be played in single-player or multiplayer. Quest for the Toa was originally designed to be a prequel to Lego Bionicle: The Legend of Mata Nui, a planned PC title developed by Saffire that would ultimately be canceled shortly before release. During development, the game's name was changed from Tales of the Tohunga to Quest for the Toa due to complaints from the Māori people of New Zealand. Upon its release, Quest for the Toa received mostly negative reviews from critics, with many criticizing its controls and gameplay. Conversely, praise was directed towards the minigames and graphics.

== Gameplay ==
A gameplay screenshot of Lego Bionicle: Quest for the Toa, which uses an isometric perspective. The player's remaining health, item uses, and ammunition are tracked in the on-screen HUD.

Lego Bionicle: Quest for the Toa has been described as an action-adventure game and a platformer. The game adopts an isometric perspective and progresses through a series of linear levels. The game features six worlds in total and over 20 levels; a minigame is unlocked after the completion of each world. Within each world is a village; the player can interact with non-playable characters in each, learning information and additional moves.

Prior to the start of the game, the color of the head, arms, and legs of the playable character can be customized. The player controls Takua, a villager on the island of Mata Nui. As Takua, the player has access to a range of abilities: jumping, throwing objects, pushing stones, and using tools. The player can choose which tools to equip and assign them to the button of their choice in the pause menu. Health and item uses can be replenished by gathering fruit and berries scattered across the world, and some fruit can be used as projectiles. Projectiles are the primary method of defeating the enemies, which populate the game's worlds.

== Synopsis ==
=== Background and setting ===
Quest for the Toa was intended to be a prequel to Lego Bionicle: The Legend of Mata Nui, which was being developed simultaneously by Saffire, and its ending is a direct setup for The Legend of Mata Nui, but the game was canceled in October 2001. The main character in Quest for the Toa, Takua, was also the playable character in the Mata Nui Online Game, an online point-and-click adventure game that continued the 2001 Bionicle story.

Quest for the Toa is set on the fictional island of Mata Nui, which is divided into six elementally-themed regions: the aquatic region of Ga-Wahi, the jungle region of Le-Wahi, the icy and mountainous region of Ko-Wahi, the subterranean region of Onu-Wahi, the desert region of Po-Wahi, and the volcanic region of Ta-Wahi. Each of the regions contains a village, known as a koro, and each koro is led by a Turaga, the village elder. A great temple, Kini-Nui, lies near the center of the island. Although Mata Nui was once a paradise in the distant past, its villages have since lived in fear of the evil Makuta, whose dark power dominates the island at the start of the story. The villagers await the prophesied arrival of the Toa, six warriors destined to defeat Makuta and restore peace to the island.

=== Plot ===
On the beaches of Onu-Wahi, the villager Takua is informed that Turaga Whenua of Onu-Koro wishes to meet with him; upon arriving in the village, he finds that Whenua has been kidnapped by a hostile Rahi beast. After rescuing Whenua, Takua learns from the elder that many of the other Turaga have been kidnapped and that the sacred Toa Stones have been stolen by Makuta; without the Toa Stones, the Turaga cannot tell the legend of Mata Nui and the prophecy of the Toa cannot be fulfilled. Takua manages to recover the Toa Stone for Onu-Koro and departs for the other villages: he frees Turaga Nokama in Ga-Koro, Turaga Onewa in Po-Koro, Turaga Matau in Le-Koro, and Turaga Nuju in Ko-Koro, also recovering their stolen Toa stones as well as the missing tools of each Turaga.

When Takua arrives in Ta-Koro, he is met by Turaga Vakama. Although Vakama has heard of Takua's exploits in the other villages, he doubts Takua will be able to find their missing Toa Stone. Vakama tasks Takua with finding an antidote for the village's poisoned water supply; shortly afterwards, the Turaga is kidnapped. Takua manages to find Vakama and the antidote and is tasked with retrieving the missing Toa Stone, hidden in a nearby volcano. Takua recovers the stone and escapes on his lava surfboard as the volcano erupts, landing in the temple of Kini-Nui where the Turaga have all gathered. The grateful Turaga tell Takua to return the Toa Stones to their rightful places in the temple; when he does this, the stones emit a beam of light into the sky, summoning the Toa to the island and blasting Takua to a beach of Ta-Wahi, where he sees an open Toa canister and footsteps heading towards Ta-Koro.

== Development ==
Saffire had been recommended to Lego by Nintendo; Hal Rushton, the president of Saffire, felt the two companies were similar in that they both placed an emphasis on "high moral standards". Saffire employee Jay Ward called the partnership between Lego and Saffire as a "good fit", describing both companies as being "family oriented". Saffire was headquartered in American Fork, Utah, which Rushton noted had many people who could speak multiple languages; this was important to Lego because they wanted the game to support nine languages. According to Rushton, Saffire brainstormed with Lego employees to create the creature designs for both Quest for the Toa and its companion game, The Legend of Mata Nui. Taylor Hunt, the nine-year-old son of one of the game's developers, was employed for six weeks to beta test the game; Dave Rushton, the game's lead programmer, was impressed with Hunt's ability to find bugs and log every error he found.

=== Māori controversy and renaming ===
Bionicle was unique among Lego toy lines at the time in that it encompassed both toys and video games, with the setting of the toys being explained through games. The story and setting of Bionicle took inspiration from Polynesian culture and languages, and Māori language and influence were especially prominent through character names, myths, tribal symbols, and rituals. Māori representatives found this usage to be inappropriate and a "trivialization" of their culture. Māori groups had taken particular offense to the use of the word tohunga, which in the Bionicle story referred to the island's ordinary villagers; in the Māori language, the term referred to experts in a specific field. The Māori groups sought to have Lego remove these terms from the toy line and games.

Lego denied claims of cultural appropriation; spokeswoman Eva Lykkegaard noted that the company had not attempted to trademark any Māori terms and had only sought a trademark for the word Bionicle, which Lego had created. Lego ultimately agreed to stop using several words, including tohunga, and Saffire removed all mentions of them from both of their games in development; because of this, Tales of the Tohunga was renamed to Quest for the Toa. Lego also pledged to create a "code of conduct for cultural expressions of traditional knowledge" and said that no future Bionicle sets would use names of "original cultures". Although Lego did not halt production of the toy line or recall existing versions of the game, Roma Hippolite of the Ngati Koata Trust said that the Māori were "impressed by the willingness of Lego to recognise a hurt was inadvertently made and show that in their actions".

== Promotion and release ==
Quest for the Toa was initially scheduled for release on the Game Boy Advance on June 11, 2001. The game was first shown off at Camp Game Boy Advance, an event held by Nintendo, in March 2001. It was considered a surprising announcement for the event and was the first project that Saffire had unveiled in several months. Quest for the Toa was later shown off at E3 2001 alongside The Legend of Mata Nui, with both titles scheduled for release in September; although the game had been completed for "some time" as of July 18, 2001, it was still being evaluated by Nintendo at that point. The game was ultimately released on October 2 in North America and on October 26 in Europe, but the companion game The Legend of Mata Nui was canceled.

== Reception ==
Reception

Review scores
Publication	Score
GameZone	7.7/10
IGN	4.5/10
NGC Magazine	2/5
Nintendo Power	2.5/5
Nintendo World Report	5.5/10

Quest for the Toa was poorly received by critics. Hilary Goldstein of IGN gave it a 4.5 out of 10, calling it an "uninspired mess" and "just no fun". Goldstein criticized the "bland and forgettable" non-player characters and said that the game lacked any real challenge or reward but offered praise for its graphics, creature variety, and minigames. Quest for the Toa received a 5.5 out of 10 from Max Lake of Nintendo World Report. Although Lake praised its presentation value, minigames, and dialogue, he called it "a disappointment overall" and felt it was "tragically crippled by frustrating platforming and awkward play mechanics". Fwiffo of Game Over Online gave the game 54%, panning its design as "atrocious" and criticizing the gameplay as "repetitive and, often times, downright boring" but offering praise for the minigames. The game was blasted as an "eye-watering travesty" by NGC Magazine, with criticism directed at its "confused mix of game styles" and "sloppy execution". The reviewer gave the game two out of five stars and advised readers to purchase the toys instead of the game.

Reviewers at Nintendo Power gave the game 2.5 out of 5 stars, criticizing its graphics and controls but praising its minigames. Although the reviewers felt the game was "uneventful", they felt it might appeal to younger players as well as Lego fans. Michael Lafferty of GameZone gave it a 7.7/10, calling it an "enchanting journey" and an "enjoyable little outing". Although he felt the game's storyline was "tired" and noted the game as being very linear, he praised its graphics and puzzles as well as the variety of enemies and minigames. Joe Guys of Game Vortex gave the game 60%, calling the game "decent" but "more frustrating than fun" due to its difficulty.

In the January 2002 issue of Nintendo Power, Quest for the Toa ranked as the fifth-best selling Game Boy Advance Game for the month.
