= Saffire (company) =

American video game developer

- Formerly: Cygnus Multimedia Productions (1993–1995)
- Company type: Private
- Industry: Video games
- Founded: 1993; 32 years ago in Orem, Utah, US
- Founders: Les Pardew; Charles Moore
- Defunct: 2007
- Fate: Dissolved
- Headquarters: South Jordan, Utah, US
- Key people: Les Pardew (CEO); Hal Rushton (president); Mark Kendell (chairman)
- Number of employees: 120 (2001)

Saffire was an American video game developer based in South Jordan, Utah. Founded as Cygnus Multimedia Productions in 1993 by Les Pardew and Charles Moore, it was originally based in Pardew's basement in Orem with a team of six people. Pardew bought out Moore's share in 1994 and involved Hal Rushton as a partner in Moore's place. Cygnus was renamed Saffire in October 1995 and moved from Pleasant Grove to American Fork shortly thereafter for further expansion. Saffire became defunct in 2007.

== History ==
Saffire was founded by Leslie W. ("Les") Pardew with assistance by Charles Moore in 1993. The team initially consisted of six people working from Pardew's basement in Orem, Utah, and expanded to fourteen when it was incorporated in November 1993. The company was named Cygnus Multimedia Productions, taking the name from mythological king Cycnus of Liguria "because it sounded cool" and started out by creating artwork for video games of other developers.

In 1994, Pardew bought out Moore's stake in the company and brought on Hal Rushton, the former "vice president of product development" for Sculptured Software, as a partner. Rushton became the company's general manager, with Pardew as the president. By February 1995, Cygnus employed 50 people in a bottom-floor office in Pleasant Grove; the office was small, wherefore staff worked in shifts, and frequently flooded during rainfall. Cygnus changed its name to Saffire in October 1995 and moved to a new studio in the Utah Valley Business Park in American Fork later that year. The move allowed Saffire to engage in the full production of video games, which Pardew sought to fasten with continued expansion. To raise capital, Pardew borrowed US$200,000 from Utah Technology Finance Corp. (UTFC) in September 1996 and further $125,000 in March 1997.

Rushton became the company's president by December 1997, while Pardew assumed the role of chief executive officer. Saffire settled in expanded offices in Pleasant Grove in January 1999. By that time, Mark Kendell had become the company's chairman. Saffire continued to expand, with 80 employees in December 1999 and 120 employees in July 2001, the latter while based in American Fork.

In March 2007, Saffire (at the time based in South Jordan) was developing Cryptid Hunter, then scheduled for release in 2008. However, Saffire went out of business later that year.

== Games developed ==
| Title | Publisher(s) | Platform(s) | Release date |
|---|---|---|---|
| HardBall '95 | Accolade | Sega Genesis | 1995 |
| Wayne Gretzky and the NHLPA All-Stars | Time Warner Interactive | SNES | 1995 |
| Nester's Funky Bowling | Nintendo | Virtual Boy | February 1996 |
| The Suit | SoftKey Multimedia | Microsoft Windows, MS-DOS | 1996 |
| They Call Me... The Skul | SoftKey Multimedia, The Learning Company | Microsoft Windows, MS-DOS | 1996 |
| NFL Legends Football '98 | Accolade | Microsoft Windows | August 31, 1997 |
| James Bond 007 | Nintendo | Game Boy | January 29, 1998 |
| Rampage World Tour | Midway Games | Nintendo 64 | March 30, 1998 |
| Bio F.R.E.A.K.S. | Midway Games | Nintendo 64, PlayStation | May 31, 1998 |
| Oddworld Adventures | GT Interactive | Game Boy | December 1998 |
| Animaniacs: Ten Pin Alley | ASC Games | PlayStation | December 1, 1998 |
| StarCraft: Brood War | Blizzard Entertainment | Microsoft Windows, Mac OS | December 18, 1998 |
| Top Gear Rally 2 | Kemco | Nintendo 64 | October 31, 1999 |
| Tom Clancy's Rainbow Six | Red Storm Entertainment | Nintendo 64 | November 17, 1999 |
| Billy Bob's Huntin'-n-Fishin' | Midway Games | Game Boy Color | November 17, 1999 |
| Xena: Warrior Princess: The Talisman of Fate | Titus Software | Nintendo 64 | December 14, 1999 |
| Oddworld Adventures 2 | GT Interactive | Game Boy Color | January 2000 |
| The Mask of Zorro | Sunsoft | Game Boy Color | February 2000 |
| CyberTiger | Electronic Arts | Nintendo 64 | February 29, 2000 |
| ESPN MLS GameNight | Konami | PlayStation | September 19, 2000 |
| Army Men: Sarge's Heroes | Midway Games | Dreamcast | October 30, 2000 |
| Microsoft Pinball Arcade | Classified Games (U.S.), Cryo Interactive (PAL) | Game Boy Color | 2001 |
| Microsoft: The Best of Entertainment Pack | Classified Games (U.S.), Cryo Interactive (PAL) | Game Boy Color | 2001 |
| Tom Clancy's Rainbow Six: Rogue Spear | Red Storm Entertainment | PlayStation | March 27, 2001 |
| Lego Bionicle: Quest for the Toa | Lego Software | Game Boy Advance | October 3, 2001 |
| Lego Bionicle: The Legend of Mata Nui | Lego Software | Microsoft Windows | Canceled in October 2001 |
| E.T.: Escape from Planet Earth | NewKidCo | Game Boy Color | November 4, 2001 |
| Barbarian | Titus Software | PlayStation 2 | June 27, 2002 |
| Hot Wheels Velocity X | THQ | Game Boy Advance | October 31, 2002 |
| Justice League: Injustice for All | Midway Games | Game Boy Advance | November 17, 2002 |
| Peter Pan: The Motion Picture Event | Atari Interactive | Game Boy Advance | November 4, 2003 |
| The Hobbit | Sierra Entertainment | Game Boy Advance | November 11, 2003 |
| Van Helsing | Vivendi Universal Games | PlayStation 2, Xbox, Game Boy Advance | May 6, 2004 |
| Around the World in 80 Days | Hip Games | Game Boy Advance | July 5, 2004 |
| Thunderbirds | Vivendi Universal Games | Game Boy Advance | August 10, 2004 |
