= Kritikos =

- Language: English

Publication details
- History: 2004–present
- Publisher: Intertheory Press
- Frequency: Monthly
- Open access: Yes

Standard abbreviations
- ISO 4: Kritikos

Indexing
- ISSN: 1552-5112

Kritikos: journal of postmodern cultural sound, text and image is a monthly peer-reviewed open access academic journal published by Intertheory Press. The journal and press were established in 2004 by the current editor-in-chief, Nicholas Ruiz III (University of Central Florida).

The journal is abstracted and indexed in the MLA International Bibliography, EBSCO databases, and Intute Arts and Humanities Index.
