= Mata Nui Online Game =

2001 video game

- Developer: Templar Studios
- Publisher: The Lego Group
- Series: Bionicle
- Engine: Adobe Flash
- Platform: Web browser
- Release: 2001
- Genre: Point-and-click adventure game
- Mode: Single-player

Mata Nui Online Game (also known as Mata Nui Adventure Game or Mata Nui: The Online Game) is a 2001 point-and-click adventure browser game developed by Templar Studios to promote the Lego Bionicle line of constructible action figures. The game follows Takua, a villager on the island of Mata Nui, as he explores the island, encountering other villagers and the Toa, heroic elemental warriors, on their quest to defeat the evil Makuta.

The game was developed and released episodically on the official Bionicle website throughout 2001, launching in January and concluding in December. It was later re-released in 2006 in downloadable form and in 2013 by Templar on their website. Following the cancelation of Lego Bionicle: The Legend of Mata Nui, Mata Nui Online Game became the primary vehicle for the 2001 Bionicle story. The game was highly popular and is credited with helping to establish the success of the toy line. It received awards from the marketing industry, and retrospective reviews have highlighted its expansion of the concept of what Lego-related play can be and its popularity among fans of Bionicle.

== Background and gameplay ==
A gameplay screenshot from Mata Nui Online Game. In this screen, the player can choose to follow the footprints, examine the canister, or head towards the waving villager. The cliff area houses a telescope, used to tease future updates to the game.

Mata Nui Online Game is set on the fictional island of Mata Nui, which is divided into six elementally-themed regions: the aquatic region of Ga-Wahi, the jungle region of Le-Wahi, the icy and mountainous region of Ko-Wahi, the subterranean region of Onu-Wahi, the desert region of Po-Wahi, and the volcanic region of Ta-Wahi. Each of the regions contains a village, known as a koro. A great temple, Kini-Nui, lies near the center of the island. Each village is led by a Turaga elder. The island's villages live in fear of the evil Makuta, whose dark power dominates the island. The island is inhabited by Rahi, or animals, some of which have fallen under the control of Makuta. In order to have the power to defeat Makuta, the island's Toa warriors must collect six Kanohi masks, each of which grants them a unique power.

Some elements of the game are not officially canon to the Bionicle story, as they were not officially approved by the Bionicle story team. However, the game is regarded as one of the major vehicles of the 2001-2003 Bionicle story and became the primary story medium following the cancellation of the planned PC game Lego Bionicle: The Legend of Mata Nui.

Mata Nui Online Game is a browser-based point-and-click adventure game. The game was designed to run using Adobe Flash. During the game, the player controls Takua, an adventurous villager on the island of Mata Nui; Takua is also the playable character in Lego Bionicle: Quest for the Toa, which was released in October 2001, and the events of Mata Nui Online Game directly follow the ending of Quest for the Toa. Takua was later featured as the main character of the 2003 film Bionicle: Mask of Light. The player can move throughout the island by moving their cursor to the left and right side of the screen and clicking when an icon appears. Objects and characters in the world can be interacted with; some items can be presented to non-playable characters or used in the world. The player later gains access to a flute, which can be used for fast travel to any of the island's villages. The game was released episodically, and the content of future episodes was teased through an in-game telescope.

== Plot ==
An amnesiac Takua awakens on the beaches of Ta-Wahi where he encounters Maku, a villager from Ga-Koro. He learns the village has been attacked by a Rahi and offers to help. In Ga-Koro, he finds all of the villagers and Turaga Nokama trapped in a submerged hut; he returns the hut to the surface by re-activating a pump. The Rahi returns to attack but is defeated by Gali, the Toa of water.

After visiting his home village of Ta-Koro, Takua ventures to Po-Koro to inform Huki, a friend of Maku, that she is safe. When he arrives, he finds the village has been struck by a mysterious disease and that Huki, one of the star players of the island's popular sport of Koli, is gravely ill. Takua finds a popular new type of Koli ball, the Comet ball, and takes one to Turaga Onewa, who discovers they are infected and are the source of the disease. Takua steals a key from a Comet ball merchant and heads to the quarry, where he uncovers a cave with a large pile of infected Comet balls guarded by a Rahi. Aided by Pohatu, the Toa of stone, he collapses the cave. They return to the village to find the merchant has fled and the villagers are recovering. In Ga-Koro, Nokama assigns Takua the role of Chronicler, tasking him with providing a record of the island's major events.

In Onu-Koro, the mining of light-bearing lightstones has stopped due to a lava break. Using a lava surfboard, Takua crosses the break and activates a pump that disperses the lava, allowing the miners to resume and complete a tunnel to Le-Wahi. In Le-Koro, Takua finds the village mostly deserted. Two villagers, Kongu and Tamaru, explain that the entire village has been abducted by Rahi. Kongu and Takua fly to the Rahi hive, where the population has been forced into labor and Lewa, the Toa of air, has been placed under the control of Makuta by an infected mask. Onua, the Toa of earth, arrives and battles Lewa. Onua removes the infected mask from Lewa, allowing everyone to escape the hive. The villagers celebrate their liberation, and Lewa receives a golden mask.

Takua visits Ko-Koro to speak to Turaga Nuju, but is told he cannot do so until his interpreter Matoro returns. In the snow drifts, Matoro is attacked by a Rahi but is saved by Kopaka, the Toa of ice. After meeting with Nuju, who warns him that the villages will be defenseless as the Toa face Makuta directly, Takua travels to the other villages, each of which offers one villager to accompany him. The company sets out to Kini-Nui, where the underground lair of Makuta lies. The Toa task them with protecting the temple in order to prevent Rahi from entering the temple as they face Makuta. Gali creates a mental link between herself and Takua, allowing him to witness the events within the temple.

As the company repels multiple waves of Rahi, the six Toa merge into two Toa Kaita and are confronted by Manas crabs. The company is nearly overwhelmed by the Rahi while the Toa Kaita are seemingly outmatched by the Manas. However, the military forces of the other villages arrive to reinforce the company and the Toa Kaita defeat the Manas by deactivating their control towers. The Toa Kaita are forcibly unmerged by Makuta; before their mental link breaks, Gali urges Takua to find a way into Makuta's lair.

Using a gateway in Onu-Koro, Takua enters Makuta's lair. The Toa confront Makuta, who first appears in the form of a corrupted villager before transforming into a swirling vortex. The Toa each unsuccessfully attempt to fight Makuta individually; after working together and combining their powers, Makuta is defeated and the Toa are teleported away. Takua attempts to flee and encounters a hive; insectoid beings emerge from it. Takua escapes to the beach, where he finds Vakama, who declares him as one of the great heroes of Mata Nui. The two return to Ta-Koro to celebrate.

== Background and release ==
=== Development ===
According to Peter Mack, the president of Templar Studios, Lego had contacted the team in 1999 to develop material for their upcoming Bionicle line. The two companies had worked together on previous projects, including a game based on the Lego Mindstorms line. In September 2000, Templar pitched the idea of an adventure game similar to Myst that would be set on the island of Mata Nui. Because the story of the main heroes of the line - the Toa - was to be told in other outlets, the game utilized and was based around the Tohunga villagers packaged with McDonald's Happy Meals. The decision by Lego to split the story across different platforms was an intentional one. Splitting the story across multiple platforms made it so kids could always learn something new about the story - the focal point of Lego's promotional efforts. Mata Nui Online Game was a key part of Lego's aggressive multimedia campaign, as it introduced players to the world of Mata Nui and allowed them to explore it. Following the cancellation of The Legend of Mata Nui in October 2001, the 2001 Bionicle story was left to be resolved in other outlets, including Mata Nui Online Game.

The game was updated regularly with new content, which allowed Lego to advance the story of Bionicle throughout the year. Lego hoped this approach would allow interest in the line to be maintained throughout its first year. Templar referred to these updates internally as "programs"; the game initially featured only the beach area, but expanded to include all villages on the island of Mata Nui and culminate with the Toa's battle with Makuta. The first episode of Mata Nui Online Game was released in January 2001; the first sets from the Bionicle toy line itself were not launched until May and June 2001. The final episode was released in December 2001. The development team at Templar Studios, based on the Lower East Side of Manhattan, witnessed the September 11 attacks from their office; the final chapters of the game, including the dialogue for Makuta during his fight with the Toa, were influenced by the event.

=== Māori controversy ===
The story and setting of Bionicle took inspiration from Polynesian culture and languages, with Māori language and influence being especially prominent through character names, myths, tribal symbols, and rituals. Māori representatives were not pleased with this, finding it to be inappropriate and a "trivialization" of their culture. Māori groups had taken particular offense to the use of the word Tohunga, which in the Bionicle story referred to the island's ordinary villagers; in the Māori language, the term referred to experts in a specific field. The Māori groups sought to have Lego remove these terms from the toy line and games. Lego denied claims of cultural appropriation, with spokeswoman Eva Lykkegaard noting that the company had not attempted to trademark any Māori terms and had only sought a trademark for the word Bionicle, which Lego had created. She also said that Lego had attempted to avoid interfering in Māori culture and had only used it as inspiration. Lego ultimately agreed to stop using Tohunga, along with several other words. References to the Polynesian gods Rangi and Papa were removed as the game was updated, while re-releases of Mata Nui Online Game removed and replaced "Tohunga" with "Matoran", along with the names for several characters.

=== Re-releases ===
Mata Nui Online Game was re-released in 2006 in downloadable form on the official Bionicle website, with an accompanying narrative guide written by Mark Durham of the Bionicle forum Mask of Destiny. The game was later removed from the Bionicle website, but Templar Studios uploaded an official version to their site in April 2013. Prior to the discontinuation of Adobe Flash in December 2020, the game was archived by Flashpoint, a project which aimed to preserve Flash and Shockwave-based games.

== Reception and legacy ==
Mata Nui Online Game received awards from the marketing industry. In 2001, the Web Marketing Association awarded the game the "Best of Industry" WebAward in the "Best Toy and/or Hobby Web Site" category. At the 2002 Summit Awards, it received the Silver Award in the "Consumer Informational Site" category.

Leah Weston, the senior developer of Bionicle.com, said that Lego was "highly pleased" with Templar's work and noted the site had averaged 500,000 views a month. In 2003, Fast Company highlighted the game as a key part of helping Bionicle become a leader in the toy market. At the 2011 Massachusetts Institute of Technology (MIT) Media in Transition 7: Unstable Platforms conference, Aaron Smith cited the game's episodic structure as a reason for the success of the Bionicle website, as it kept players returning for additional content. A sequel, Mata Nui Online Game II: The Final Chronicle, was later released.

In a 2005 article for the journal Kritikos, Thorsten Botz-Bornstein noted the game redefined the traditional expectation of Lego play as the "simplest thing in the world". He cited the confrontation with Makuta, who declares himself incapable of being destroyed as he is "nothing", as an example of the more spatially abstract, postmodern approach that Bionicle took to the concept of play. In February 2020, Eric Van Allen of USgamer cited the Mata Nui Online Game as a "classic" Flash game, while J. Brodie Shirey of Screen Rant in April noted that the game has become regarded by many as the "definitive Bionicle experience". In August 2021, Gray Fore of Screen Rant credited the game with introducing the "aesthetic and visual themes" of Mata Nui to a wide audience.
