= Bionicle (video game) =

2003 video game

- Developers: Argonaut Games; Argonaut Sheffield; Möbius Entertainment (GBA)
- Publishers: Electronic Arts; Lego Interactive; THQ (GBA); Feral Interactive (OS X)
- Platforms: GameCube, Game Boy Advance, Mac OS X, PlayStation 2, Xbox, Windows
- Release: Game Boy Advance: NA: September 9, 2003; EU: September 26, 2003; GameCube, PlayStation 2, Xbox: EU: October 10, 2003 (PS2); EU: October 17, 2003 (Xbox); NA: October 20, 2003; EU: October 31, 2003 (GC); Windows: NA: October 28, 2003; EU: October 31, 2003; Mac OS X: WW: January 22, 2005
- Genre: Platform
- Mode: Single-player

Bionicle (also known as Bionicle: The Game) is a 2003 platform video game in the greater Bionicle franchise developed by Argonaut Games and published by Electronic Arts and Lego Interactive for GameCube, PlayStation 2, Xbox, and Microsoft Windows. A port was released for Mac OS X, and a version was also developed for the Game Boy Advance. In the home console version, the player controls the Toa, elementally-powered warriors, as they traverse through levels; some levels are 3D platformers, while others utilize mechanics like snowboarding or lava surfing. The game's story, which takes creative liberties with the official Bionicle story, follows the Toa as they defend the island of Mata Nui from the return of the evil Makuta and his minions.

Bionicle received mixed to negative reviews from critics, who disliked its short length and camera angles. Some gameplay elements, like the elemental absorption mechanic, were viewed more favorably. Bionicle sold poorly upon its release, resulting in Argonaut not receiving any licensing royalties; the company would dissolve in August 2006. A tech demo for a sequel, tentatively titled Bionicle: City of Legends, was leaked online in 2012.

== Gameplay and plot ==
A gameplay screenshot from Bionicle. The HUD in the upper left-hand corner features a damage bar on the top and an elemental energy meter on the bottom.

Bionicle is a 3D platform game. The game's levels vary between normal platforming levels and levels that use mechanics like snowboarding or lava surfing. Lightstones are scattered throughout each level, and collecting them unlocks bonus content. Captive Matoran characters are located in some levels, and finding them is necessary to solve puzzles. Each Toa character can attack using elemental energy; the attacks automatically target enemies. By timing attacks correctly, the player can launch a multi-bolt attack. Elemental energy depletes after each use. In order to replenish their supply, the player can shield and absorb attacks from enemies or draw in energy directly from the environment. When drawing from the environment, the player is vulnerable to attack. Elemental energy can also be resupplied by finding masks – called Kanohi – of elemental energy.

Bionicle is set on the fictional island of Mata Nui, which is divided into six elementally-themed regions, or Wahi: the aquatic region of Ga-Wahi, the jungle region of Le-Wahi, the icy and mountainous region of Ko-Wahi, the subterranean region of Onu-Wahi, the desert region of Po-Wahi, and the volcanic region of Ta-Wahi. Each of the regions contains a village, known as a koro, and each koro is led by a Turaga, the village elder. A great temple, Kini-Nui, lies near the center of the island. Each village is protected by a Toa, a warrior with elemental powers. According to Bionicle story team member Greg Farshtey, the game took creative liberties with the official Bionicle story, although some aspects, like the Kanohi of elemental energy, were later adopted into the official lore. All six Toa are playable in the game – some as normal Toa, and others as upgraded Toa Nuva – as well as the new seventh Toa, Takanuva, the Toa of light. The story follows the Toa as they defend Mata Nui against the return of the evil Makuta – the lord of darkness – and his minions, culminating with a battle between Takanuva and Makuta.

The Game Boy Advance version of Bionicle, an isometric platformer, adopts a different gameplay structure. In an interview with Bionicle fan site BZPower, the game developers noted it told the same story and offered a greater variety of playable characters but lacked the variety of the other versions. All six regions are in the game, and all six Toa are playable characters, along with Takanuva.

== Development and release ==
In an interview with Bionicle fan site BZPower, the game's producers said that development on the home console version of Bionicle began in October 2001. Argonaut Games and Electronic Arts were brought onboard in late 2001 and early 2002, respectively. The Game Boy Advance version was developed by a separate team, Möbius Entertainment, and published by THQ; it began development in 2003, and the first screenshots were shown that June.

For the console and computer versions of the game, the developers could not get access to the voice actors for Bionicle: Mask of Light, they instead chose "sound-alike" actors for the game's cutscenes. Sarah Marshall, the marketing manager of Bionicle, said that they did not want the game to feature "hack and slash" combat, because Bionicle is about being a "bit smarter than that", so the decision was made to rely entirely on elementally-powered combat instead.

The game was officially announced in March 2003. A total of 13 playable Toa (all six Toa and Toa Nuva, as well as Takanuva) were said to be available. According to Brad Shoemaker of GameSpot, players would help the Toa "evolve" into the Toa Nuva and discover the "seventh and final Toa". The game was previewed at E3 2003; early trailers, including the E3 trailer, showcased a level featuring Lewa – one of the Toa – that was ultimately absent from the game. Bionicle was showcased that July at EA's "Camp EA" event; IGN praised this version's gameplay as "fast and furious" and said that "the level of detail and care put into Bionicle was really surprising, and it gives the impression that LEGO Interactive is committed to delivering a quality kid friendly title". They also noted that each level required collecting a certain number of lightstones to complete and cited the game as being an "eight to ten hour adventure".

The Game Boy Advance version of Bionicle was released on September 9, 2003. The home console version of Bionicle was released in the following month on October 20. A PC version was released on October 28, featuring additional lighting effects the console versions did not have. In Europe, the PlayStation 2, Xbox, as well as the GameCube and PC versions were released on October 10, October 17, and October 31, respectively. A version for Mac OS X, ported by Zonic and published by Feral Interactive, was released via Feral Interactive's online store on January 22, 2005. In 2009, Feral included Bionicle's OS X port in its Family Fun Pack 3 collection.

== Reception ==
=== Critical ===
Reception

Aggregate scores
Aggregator	Score
GameRankings	GCN: 45% PC: 49% PS2: 51% Xbox: 41%
Metacritic	GCN: 47/100; PC: 52/100; PS2: 51/100; Xbox: 49/100

Review scores
Publication	Score
Cube	GCN: 4.4/10
Game Informer	GCN: 6.0/10
GameSpot	GCN/PC/PS2/Xbox: 4.7/10
GameZone	PS2: 7.6/10
IGN	GCN/PS2/Xbox: 3.8/10; PC: 3.5/10
Official Xbox Magazine	Xbox: 5.5/10
Xbox Nation	Xbox: 6/10

According to review aggregator Metacritic, the PC and PS2 versions of Bionicle received "mixed to average" reviews from critics while the GameCube and Xbox versions received "generally unfavorable reviews". The game's extremely short length was sharply criticized, as were its camera controls. The elemental absorption mechanic was received favorably, although some felt it was ultimately underutilized. Critics felt the game might be appropriate for Bionicle fans or young gamers.

IGN reviewer Mary Jane Irwin said that Bionicle could "hardly be called a game". She sharply criticized the "horrid" camera system, "hodgepodge" of gameplay styles, "thin" storyline, and short length. Brett Todd of GameSpot said that "all the wonder of the Bionicle universe has been bled dry by a vapid design and an atrocious camera system" and questioned whether even kids could remain engaged throughout the game's short length; he noted the game could be completed in less time than it takes to watch Bionicle: Mask of Light. PC Gamer likewise criticized camera angles "which shift at inopportune times" and the game's controls, calling it "a terribly frustrating experience". Nintendo Power praised variety of playable characters in the Game Boy Advance version as "a welcome addition to the genre" but stated there was "little else" upon which to recommend the game.

Byron Wilkinson of Cube claimed that readers would "have more fun buying a bucket of Lego and building a toilet" than they would playing Bionicle and called it a "sad" indictment of the video game industry's treatment of licensed properties. Frank O'Connor of Official Xbox Magazine unfavorably compared Bionicle to a PlayStation title, citing the "blocky textures", "primitive camera angles", and "garish color palette". He also criticized the auto-target ability and felt the game would be only appropriate for only "serious Bionicle fans", as it "follows the bizarrely melodramatic plot to a tee". Macworld pointed to lack of challenge for experienced players, short length, "absolutely wretched" camera controls, and higher price point than the console version as reasons why the OS X version is "one to avoid" except for "a Bionicle fan... who hasn't already played this on a console", instead recommending Rayman 3.

Some critics viewed Bionicle more favorably. Adam Biessener of Game Informer called it "quite solid" and said it lacked any "glaring problems". However, he felt it was too generic to be a "competitive effort" and would be safe to skip for anyone other than "kids with an affection for Legos that borders on obsession". Xbox Nation reviewer Paul Theobald felt the game had "plenty of promise" and praised the energy absorption mechanic as a "welcome element of complexity", but criticized its "extremely short length" and generic level design. While GameZone reviewer The Whiz was critical of the short length and camera, he praised Bionicle for its mission variety, boss battles, and environments as well as its difficulty and felt it would appeal to "both beginners and veterans to the platformer series". Reviewing the GameCube version, Nintendo Power called the difficulty too high for novices but recommended the game for "experienced platformer fans" who would "enjoy the challenge". MacAddict called the OS X version "impressive" and "enjoyable—if not engrossing—from beginning to end", praising the game's graphics, sound, map design, and game modes, as well as criticizing the storyline as "enjoyable" but cliché, the camera as "adequate but not intuitive", and the default control setup as "awkward".

=== Sales ===
Bionicle (along with Argonaut's other Christmas titles SWAT: Global Strike Team and I-Ninja) reportedly sold poorly and failed to generate any licensing royalties for the studio. The company was placed into administration in October 2004, and all of its employees were laid off one month later. Argonaut Games was officially dissolved on August 12, 2006. Footage of a tech demo for a planned sequel to Bionicle, titled Bionicle: City of Legends, was later leaked online and builds of the demo purported to date from December 2003 to January 2004 were later leaked to the BioMediaProject, a fan website that preserves Bionicle-related content.
