= Greg Farshtey =

American writer (born 1965)

- Born: Gregory Todd Farshtey; July 14, 1965 (age 61); Mount Kisco, New York, U.S.
- Education: State University of New York at Geneseo (BA)
- Occupations: Author; comic book writer; editor
- Writing career
- Language: English
- Genres: Fantasy fiction, Children's fiction
- Notable work: Bionicle

Gregory Todd Farshtey (born July 14, 1965) is an American writer professionally known for his work on the Bionicle series of novels (2003–2010), the Bionicle comics (2001–2010), and the Ninjago graphic novel series.

== Early life ==
Gregory Todd Farshtey was born in Mount Kisco, New York, and grew up in Monroe, New York, and Stamford, Connecticut.

After graduating with a B.A. in communications from the State University of New York at Geneseo, he worked as a reporter and sports editor before securing an editorial position with West End Games.

== Literary career ==
Over the next seven years at West End Games, Farshtey authored or co-authored over 35 role-playing game books. Farshtey contributed to the creation of the Shatterzone and Bloodshadows role-playing game universes. His authored works include Dragons Over England (1992), Strange Tales from the Nile Empire (1992), Shattered and Other Stories (1994), The River of God (1992), Hell's Feast (1994), and Demon's Dream (1996).

Farshtey joined the LEGO Group as a writer in late 2000, where he wrote for the LEGO Mania Magazine, LEGO Club Magazine, LEGO Club Jr. Magazine, and the Bionicle comic series.

Farshtey’s work includes novels and short stories written for Bionicle, Exo-Force, Hero Factory, and Ninjago. Farshtey was the editorial director at the LEGO Company.
