= Car club =

Enthusiast group

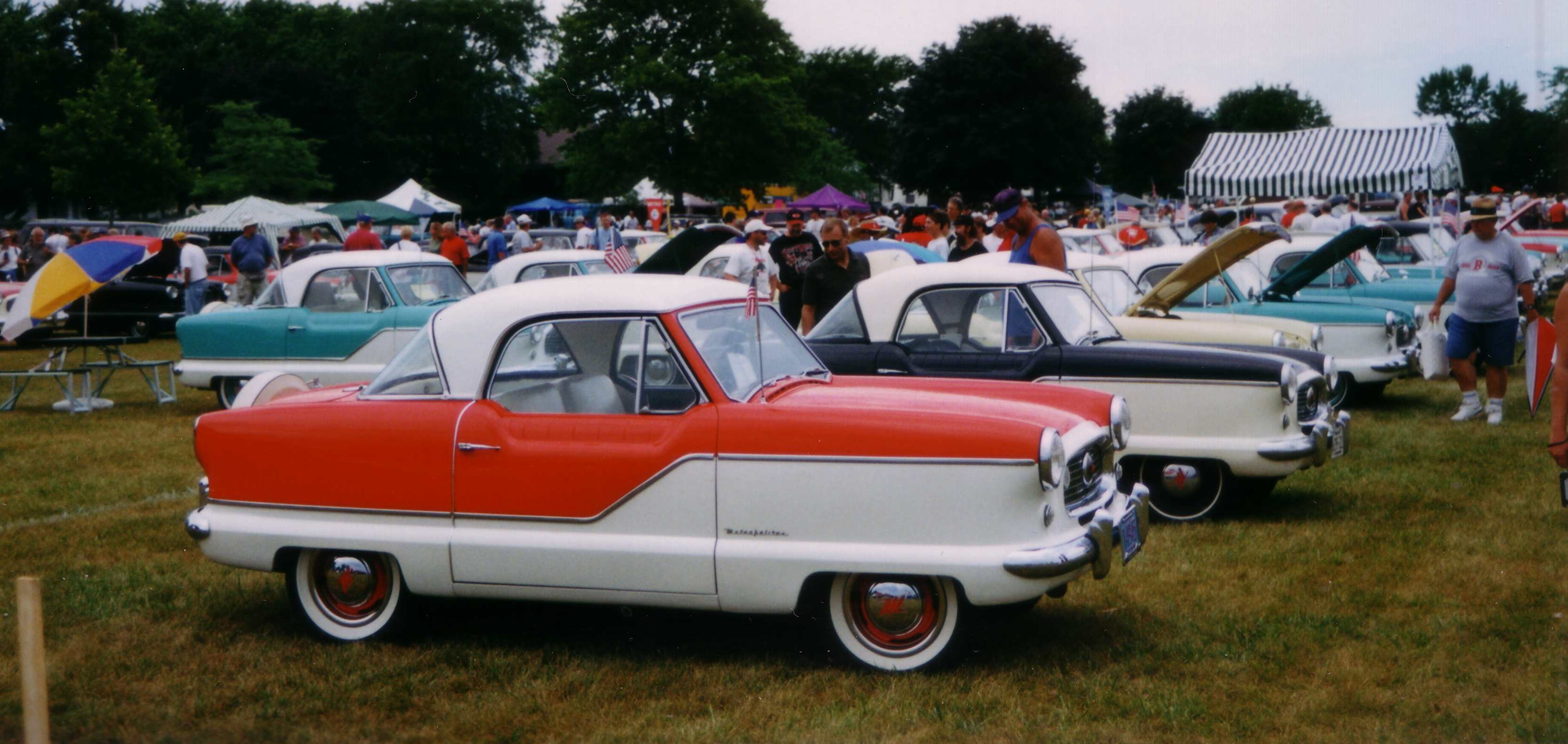
Metropolitan automobile car club meet held in Kenosha, Wisconsin

A car club or automotive enthusiast community is a group of people who share a common interest in motor vehicles. Car clubs are typically organized by enthusiasts around the type of vehicle (e.g. Chevrolet Corvette, Ford Mustang), brand (e.g. Jeep), or similar interest (e.g. off-roading). Traditional car clubs were off-line organizations, but automotive on-line communities have flourished on the internet.

== Traditional car clubs ==
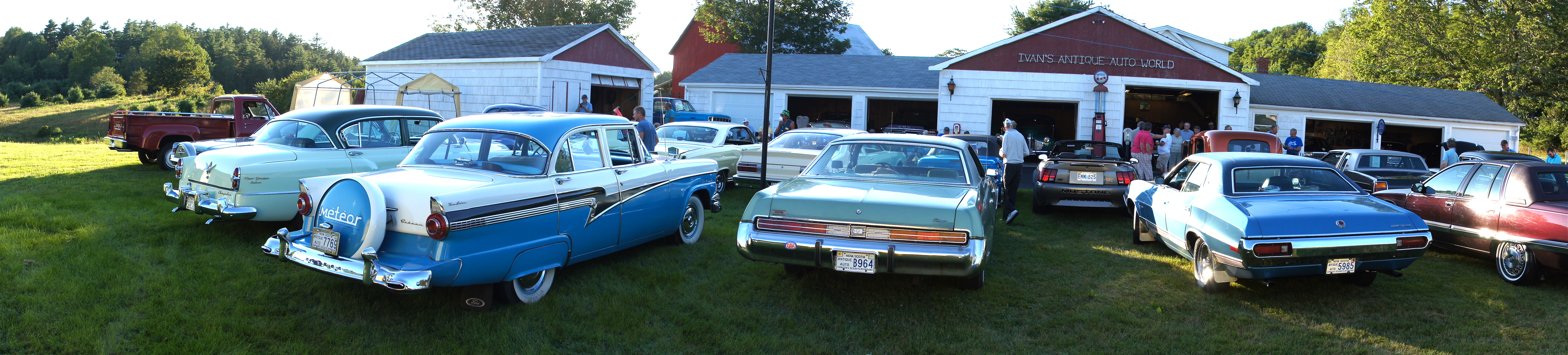
Car club social in Lunenburg County, Nova Scotia, Canada

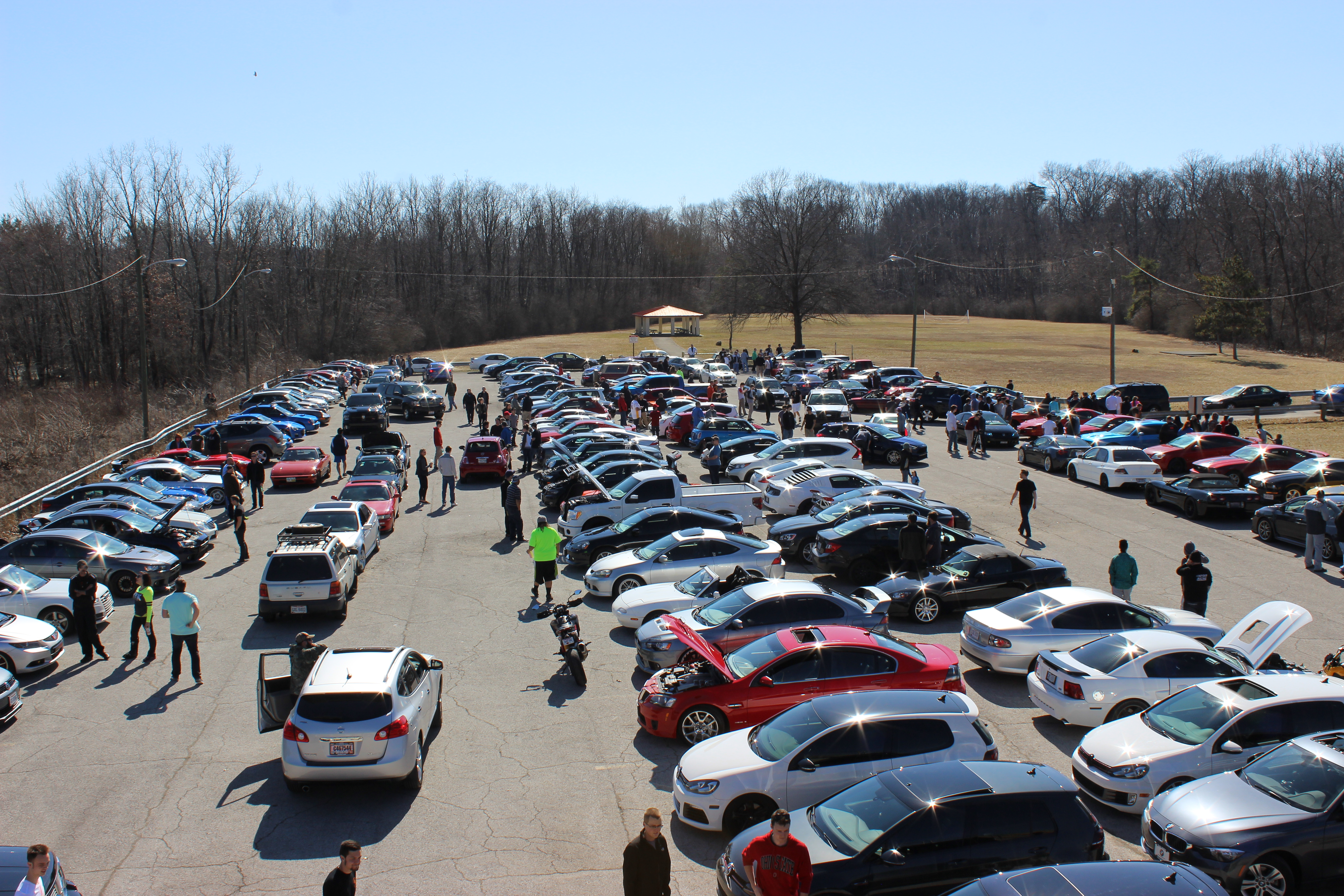
Car meet at Hoover Dam in Columbus, Ohio

Car clubs have been a form of gathering car aficionados for many years that focus a passion for a certain type of car or driving activity.

Historically, car clubs refer to off-line entities, typically organized as non-profits and run by volunteers (who were most often elected). Some clubs were large enough to be run as a paid business with salaried employees; in the 1960s, some were sponsored by car dealers.

Many car clubs charge membership fees in exchange for benefits, such as publications and events. The publications typically contain photographs, messages from other members, service and parts advice, items and vehicles wanted and/or for sale, and historical material of interest to the membership. Car clubs often host gatherings (called "meets") which often also welcome interested non-members. Car clubs also may engage in other activities of various types, including races, cruising, shows, "mod" days when garage equipment and service tools are available for members to perform and assist each other with DIY work, or community service activities. Meets are a time for the club to be with one another, talk about cars, and participate in other activities, such as eating, sightseeing, movies, etc.

Additionally, some car clubs have a "prospecting" status, where prospective members of the club meet with established club members, to assess their suitability within the club. During this time, prospective members will help work on club cars, attend events, and sometimes perform tasks; such as helping to park cars at a show, or assisting with ticket sales, etc. Upon the completion of their prospect status, members will be "patched in," whereupon they are considered full members of the club. In traditional car clubs in the US, this is typically signified by the awarding of a jacket or T-shirt with the club's name and logo on the back, and the awarding of a metal "drag plate," to be hung on the car, displaying their membership status and club name.

Many (if not most) traditional car clubs have now added online presences, although most of the content typically resides in a walled garden for members only. Most clubs have an online presence mainly through their car forums relevant to their car of interest. Some clubs also have their website. They usually use the forums or their site to organize their meets and gatherings. For example, before a big event, they would organize to see how many people are going, where to meet up, and how to caravan to their destination. Many car club members consider what they do to be not merely a hobby, but a lifestyle.

== Internet communities ==
The Internet accelerated the growth of participation as online communities attracted large numbers of members. The Internet encouraged and fostered the development of many clubs centered on specific vehicles, including niche makes and models.

Unlike traditional clubs, the content of most online communities is open to all for free. This has facilitated their growth and made them a resource for potential owners or newbies. Larger online communities report registered members in the hundreds of thousands. The Internet communities typically provide features such as forums, content databases (which include vehicle specifications, driving characteristics, repair information, and car tuning advice), Instant messaging services, photo-sharing, and commercial services (such as for sale by owner listings, part supplier directories, and referrals to mechanics and car dealers).

Most automotive communities were founded by individual enthusiasts/entrepreneurs, but some have been acquired by various internet and communication companies.

As with traditional car clubs, some Internet automotive communities sponsor or operate off-line meets. Many of the leading Internet communities feature active directories of regional meets.

Communities have also begun to form around digital media outlets such as YouTube channels and podcasts. Car enthusiasts can comment and share opinions, allowing for an element of connection not found with other media variants. These platforms are being used by smaller studios and individuals to distribute content to a mass audience without needing a large budget. Production value is often high given the technology available to amateurs in the forms of software, cameras, microphones, and other producing equipment.

== International ==
In some countries, notably in Japan, some car clubs are run as a way of regulating street races and to race against people they know, therefore reducing the possibility of an accident. Clubs are used to enter team drifting contests.

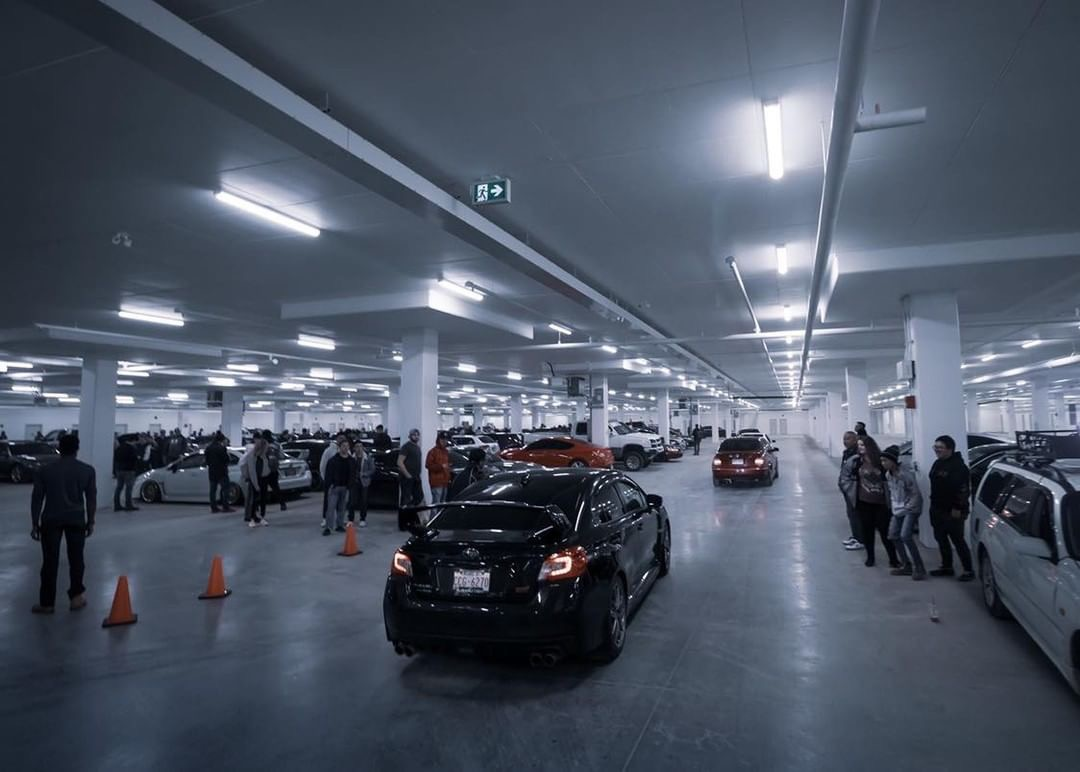
Canadian indoor car meet

Canadian car clubs have been known to host indoor car meets to avoid harsh weather and to make up for short summer seasons. These events are commonly hosted in a heated parkade, with the car clubs generally facilitating a deal with the operators of the facility.

== See also ==
- Car modding
- Lowrider club
- Motorcycle club
- Kustom Kulture
