= Volksrod =

Style of modified Volkswagen Beetle

Volksrods are a style of modified Volkswagen Beetles that emulate the look of American hot rods. They are used as an alternative to traditional Ford-based hot rods, often by people who struggle to find affordable examples of classic Ford Model Ts and Model As.

Volksrods are typically inspired by American hot rods and rat rods, with one of the main characteristics separating them from other modified Beetles being the removal of the stock fenders in order achieve an open wheel look. Some Volksrods, however, don't do this and either retain the stock fenders or opt for aftermarket fenders. As with all types of car customization, various modifications are practiced in different combinations. One popular method of conversion involves removing all body molding, bumpers and fenders, then installing a classic Ford front axle to move the wheels forward and give the car a low, stretched look. Another popular customization is to move the stock Volkswagen axle beam forward or reverse the trailing/torsion arms and re-work the steering linkages. While most Volksrods retain the rear mounted Volkswagen engine, some builders opt to swap in a larger engine such as a V8, often changing the layout of the car to front engine in the process. While Volksrods may be very elaborate, like any hot rod, many are built with few or no expensive parts, but handmade by a "cut, weld and drive" owner, with simple mechanical tools, welding equipment and basic parts.

== Gallery ==
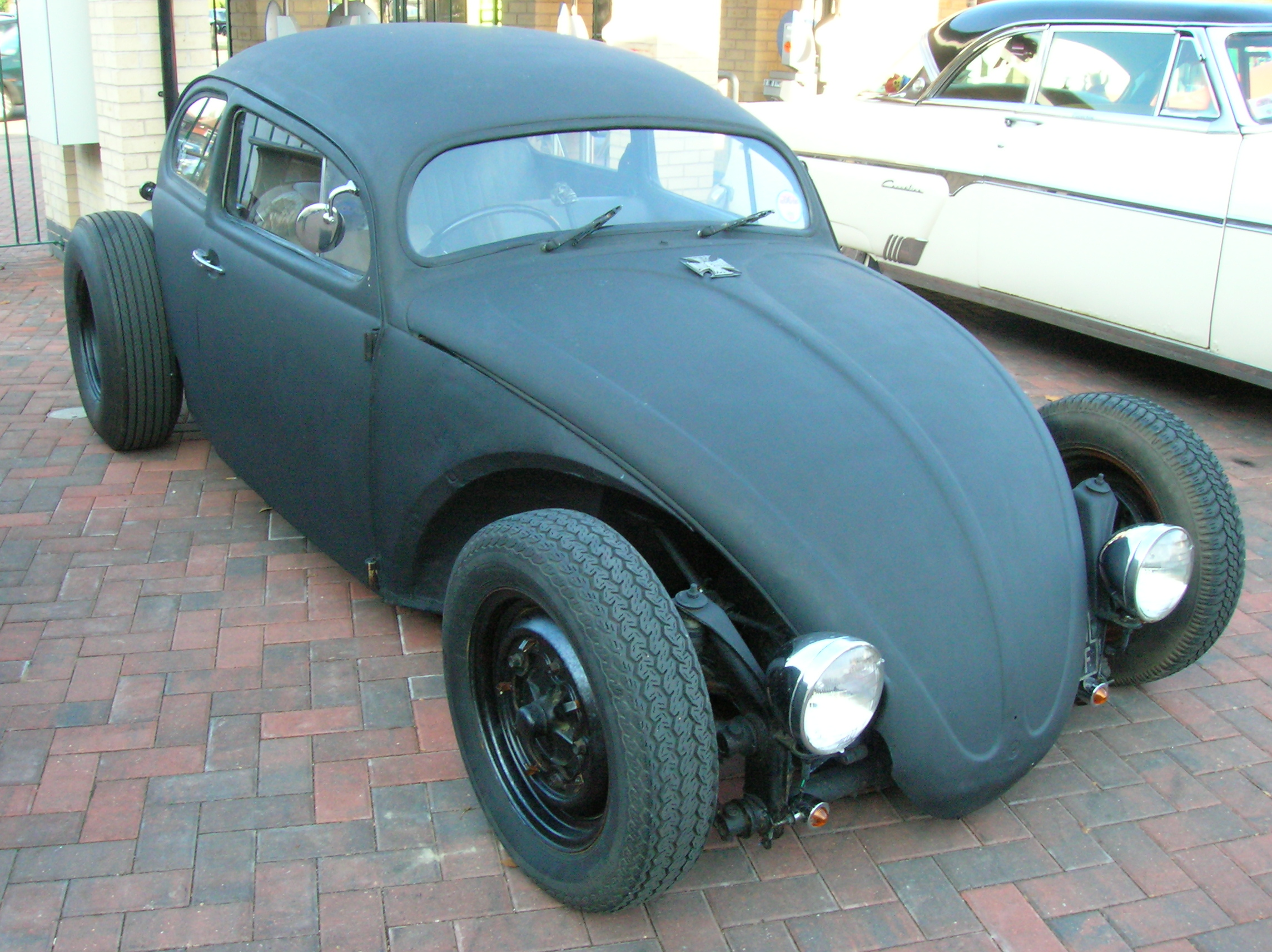
Volksrod painted matte black

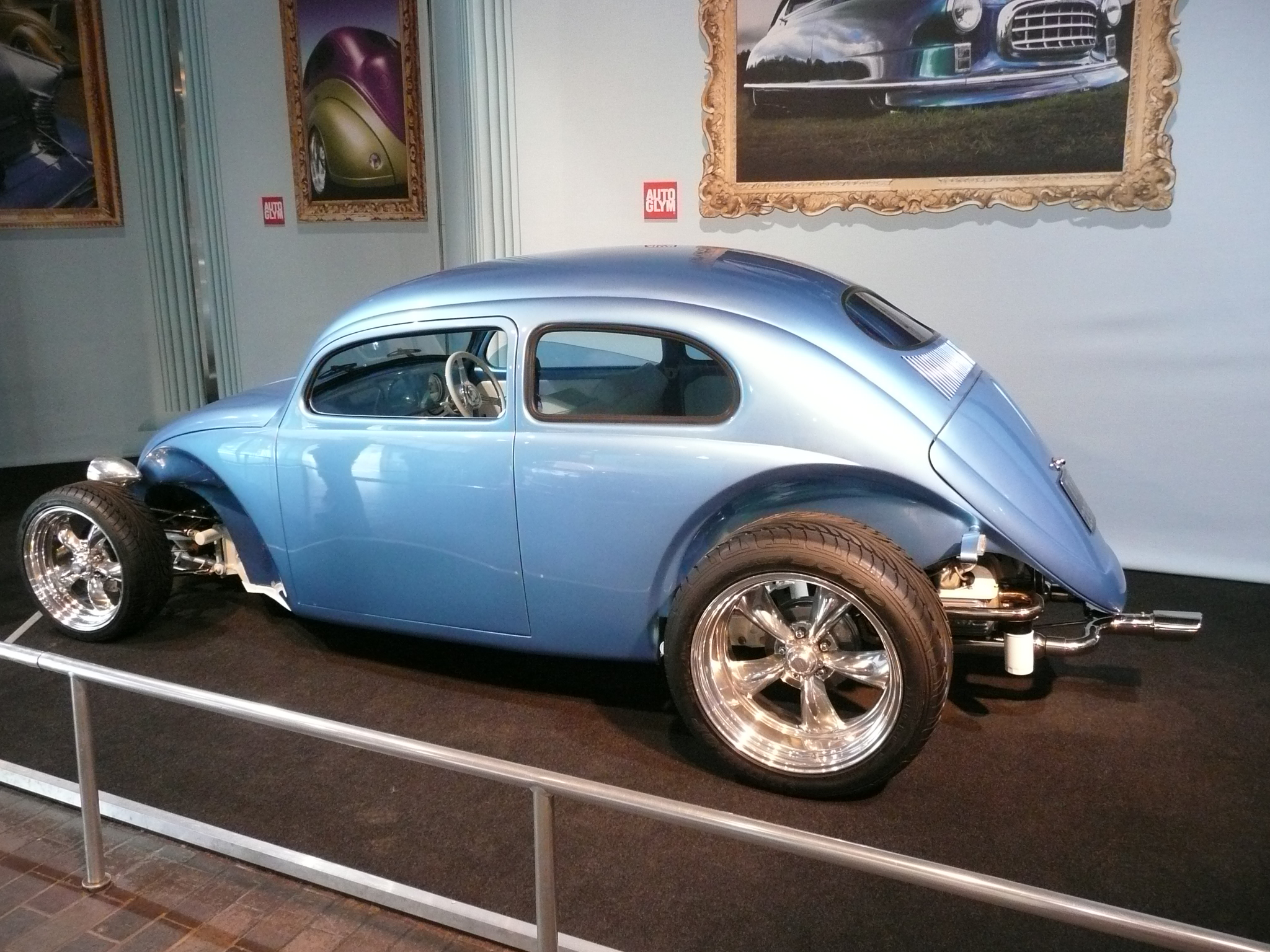
Blue Volksrod in the National Motor Museum, Beaulieu in England

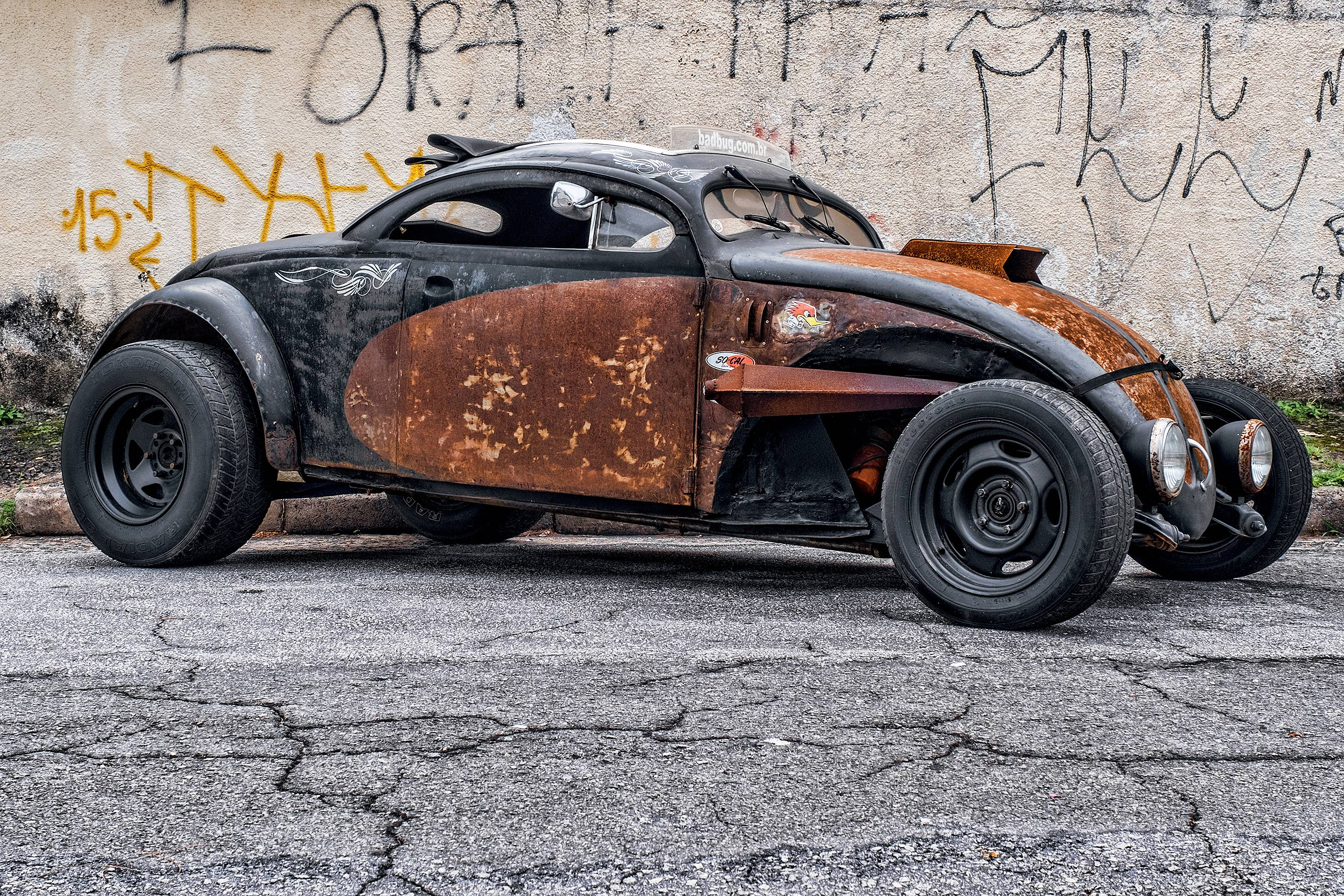
Volksrod with a chopped top modified to look like a rat rod

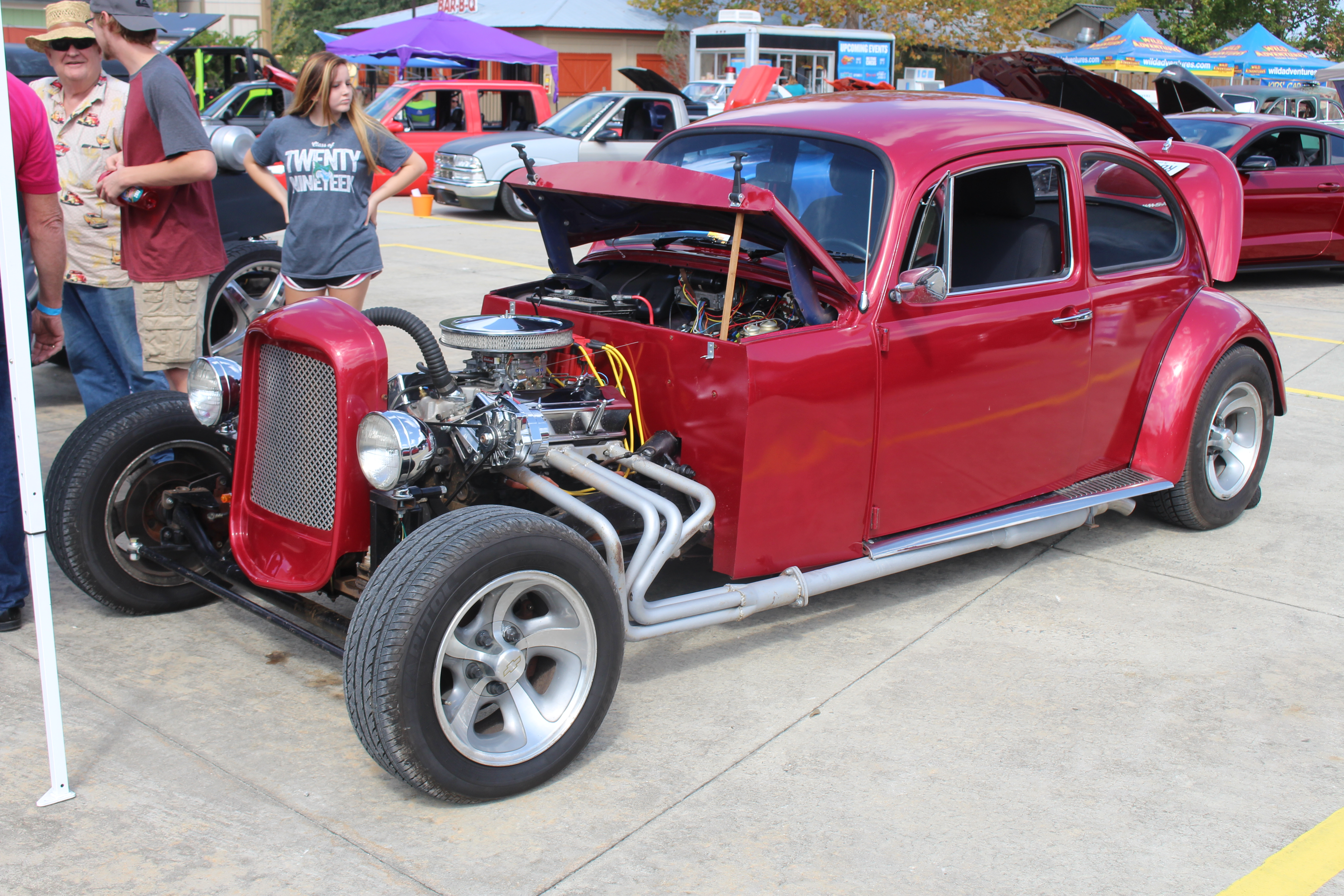
Red Volksrod with a front mounted V8 engine swap

== See also ==
- Baja bug
- Cal looker
- Cal-Style VW
- Formula Vee
- Meyers Manx
