= Cal-Style VW =

Lowrider influenced vintage Volkswagen

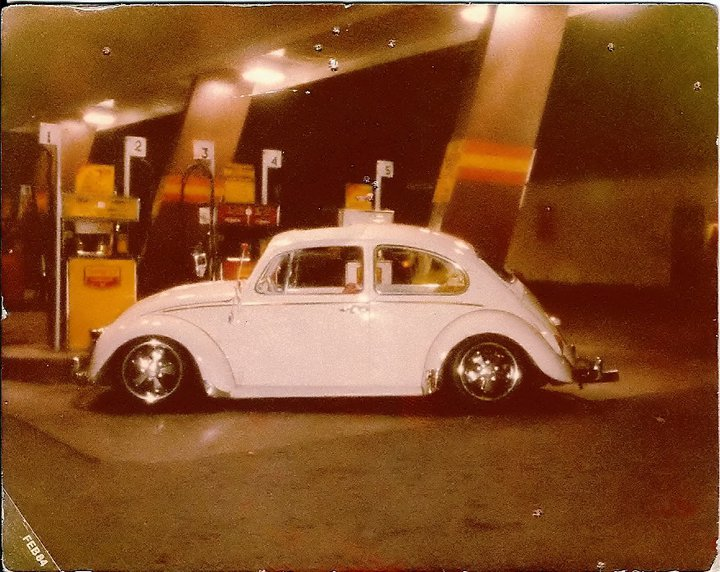
An early "true" vintage Cal-Style Volkswagen, built by Robert Velis in 1982 (Huntington Park, southeast LA, 1983)

A Cal-Style VW is a lowrider influenced vintage Volkswagen, that for style and cruising was lowered to the extreme in the manner called "dumped" "slammed" or "laid out". The Cal-Style VW originated in the streets of Los Angeles in the late 1970s, when the first generation of teens from Latino neighborhoods veered away from the Low Riders that at the time were associated with gangs and criminal activity, and instead customized their economical VWs into lowriders for the cruising and teen subculture.

== History ==
Los Angeles VW Car Clubs like the "german folks" and the "Vintage Volksters" were the pioneers of this style, building Cal-Style VWs to cruise LA landmarks – like the original Tommy's Burgers, and the iconic Whittier Boulevard in East Los Angeles – and to impress the LA teen party crowd. The first documented true example of a "Cal-Style" VW was in 1980 when Rene Ruelas, of the well-known lowrider club the "Dukes", combined style and performance with his red 1967 Karmann Ghia convertible. The vehicle was later painted black and owned by another influential Cal-Style builder in the early 1980s, Robert Velis a.k.a. VW Kidd™. This Karmann Ghia was sold overseas to Japanese car enthusiasts in the mid 1980s, and by the late 1980s the Cal-Style VW influence was spreading throughout Southern California, and it later spread throughout the world.

The Cal-Style was first called "Chicano Style", and then "Vintage Cal-Style". Around 1983–84 the term Cal-Style was universally accepted in the streets of Los Angeles.

Japan was the first foreign country to embrace the Cal-Style VW in the mid 1980s. Japan has always been drawn to California pop culture, especially lowrider car culture, and started exporting lowriders and Cal-Style VWs from Los Angeles during this time. Today the Los Angeles lowrider-influenced Cal-Style of vintage Volkswagens is very popular in Brazil, Belgium, Germany, England, Mexico, and Japan. Clubs today like The German Folks C.C., with chapters all over the world, and the Brazilian Folks, are dedicated to this style of building vintage Volkswagens.

== Specifications ==
A Cal-Style VW was an all original VW, typically painted in factory colors; two tones were a no-no unless the vehicle left the factory that way. The vehicle was lowered all the way around, and it had all the chrome trim, bumpers, and subtle chrome lowrider-influenced accessories – these were not restorations because the VWs were only 15 years old and did not need restorations yet. In the pioneer years of 1978–1984 when this style originated the Cal-Style VWs were never called the media-dubbed "Resto Cal", a term used by media outsiders today and is frowned upon by Cal-Style purists and originators.

The Cal-Styles' lowrider details were highly influenced by the 1930s' and 1940s' lowrider "bombas" that the Cal-Stylers saw while growing up in their LA Latino neighborhoods. Wheels of choice for Cal-Style VWs were the rare 901 Porsche Fuchs alloys, Porsche Cookie Cutter Alloy and the 5-spoke EMPIs. Unlike the Orange County-originated de-chromed Cal-Look VW, the LA Cal-Style vintage VW was about style, and the wheels were fully polished or chromed for "bling".

Chrome period-correct lowrider-influenced accessories like chrome vent wing shades, window rain guards, chrome knuckle guards, blue dot tail lenses, chrome headlight visors, chrome gravel guards and rear window venetian blinds were some of the Cal-Style cues that were adopted from the 1930s and 1940s Chevy “Bombs”.

== See also ==
- Cal looker
- Baja Bug
- Formula Vee
- Meyers Manx
- Volksrod
