= Resto (disambiguation) =

A resto is a rest area.

Resto may also refer to:

- Luis Resto (disambiguation)
- Resto Cal lookers, modified Volkswagen Beetles
