= Meyers Manx =

Two-passenger recreational kit car

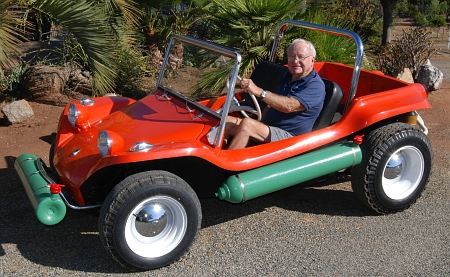
- Bruce Meyers in a genuine Meyers Manx

Overview
- Manufacturer: Bruce F. Meyers individually (prototype); B. F. Meyers & Co. (main production); Meyers Manx, Inc. (modern revival)
- Production: 1964–65 (prototype, 12 built); 1965–1971 (main, ~6,000 built); 1999–present (limited)
- Assembly: Newport Beach, California (prototype); Fountain Valley, California (main); Valley Center, California (revival)

Body and chassis
- Class: Dune buggy Kit car
- Body style: Open-wheeled
- Layout: RR layout

Powertrain
- Engine: 1.2L VW H4, 1.3L VW H4, 1.5L VW H4, 1.6L H4
- Transmission: 4-speed manual transaxle, 2-wheel drive
- Battery: 40 kWh (BEV)

The Meyers Manx dune buggy is a small, two-passenger, recreational kit car designed and marketed by California engineer, artist, boat builder and surfer Bruce F. Meyers and manufactured by his Fountain Valley, California company, B. F. Meyers & Co. from 1964 to 1971.

The roofless, windowless, fenderless, high-hipped and high-tailed fiberglass body was designed to work with the mechanicals and chassis of a Volkswagen Beetle, exposing the engine and taking advantage of the Beetle's light weight, rear-engine traction, removable bodywork and suitability to off- and on-road driving.

Drawing on his art background, Meyers would later say he combined the Volkswagen Schwimmwagen's high fenders and short wheelbase, the Volkswagen Kübelwagen's stand-up headlamps and the chic, open simplicity of European beach cars — e.g., the Fiat 500 Jolly, Citroën Méhari, and BMC Mini Moke.

The Manx immediately began dominating dune racing and breaking records and was eventually also released in on-road models. The original company would succumb to tax problems after Meyers's departure, and was re-founded in 2000 as Meyers Manx, Inc., marketing new kits inspired by the original Manx.

In 2024, Meyer's original Manx prototype was inducted into the National Historic Vehicle Register, for its association with American historic events and figures, and its design and construction importance. Meyers himself died on February 19, 2021 at 94.

The Manx nameplate and logo derived from the cat, sharing the cat's high-tailed, stubby profile.

== Home-made prototype ==
Drawing on his experience in sailboat construction, Meyers modeled and built his first dune buggy, "Old Red", a shortened VW Beetle with a monocoque fiberglass shell and Chevrolet pickup truck (trailing arm style) suspension, in late 1963 to May 1964 in his garage in Newport Beach, California. The first known street-legal fiberglass dune buggy, it featured a unibody shell that fused body, fenders and frame, retaining just the engine, transmission and other mechanicals of the VW, and with no top and no hood. The use of compound curves throughout provided great rigidity. The fenders were arched high, to make room for large, knobby dirt-racing wheels.

The "Manx" name for the shortened, taller-wheeled, more maneuverable VW Beetle mods refers to and derives from the comparably stubby Manx cat The tailless cat in the logo, as featured on the hood ornament, is stylized after a passant heraldic lion, its right forepaw brandishing a sword. The name also suggests racing fitness, as the already globally renowned British-manufactured Norton Manx motorcycle dominated the Isle of Man TT, Manx Grand Prix and other Isle of Man-based (i.e. Manx) international races from the 1940s to the early 1970s. The Meyers Manx has no direct connection to the Isle of Man.

Meyers produced kits later in 1964 and into 1965, marketed under the name Meyers Manx. Although this early design was critically acclaimed, even featured on the April 1967 cover of Car & Driver magazine, and drew much attention, it proved too expensive to be profitable; ultimately only 12 kits of the monocoque Manx were produced.

Amateur racers Meyers and a friend broke the Ensenada – La Paz record of 39 hours by four hours, until then held by a professional racer. According to James Hale, compiler of the Dune Buggy Handbook, the win ushered in an era of Meyers Manx "domination in off-road events ... and the formation of NORRA (National Off-Road Racing Association)".

== B. F. Meyers & Co. ==
The commercially manufactured Meyers Manx Mk I featured an open-wheeled fiberglass bodyshell, to be coupled by its purchaser with the Volkswagen Type 1 flat-four engine (1.2 L, 1.3 L, 1.5 L and 1.6 L, in different models) and a modified RR-layout Beetle pan. It is a small car, with a wheelbase 14 1/4 inches (36 cm) shorter than a Beetle automobile for lightness and better maneuverability. For this reason, the car is capable of very quick acceleration and good off-road performance, despite not being four-wheel drive. The usually street-legal car redefined and filled a recreational and competitive niche that had been essentially invented by the first civilian Jeep in 1945, and which was later to be overtaken by straddle-ridden, motorcycle-based all-terrain vehicles (introduced in 1970) and newer, small and sporty (but usually four-wheel-drive), off-road automobiles.

The commercial Meyers Manx received widespread recognition when it defeated motorcycles, trucks and other cars to win the inaugural 1967 Mexican 1000 race (the predecessor of the Baja 1000). It crossed automotive press genre and was selected as the cover story for the August 1966 issue of Hot Rod Magazine.

Approximately 6,000 original Manx kits were manufactured, but when the design became popular, many copies (estimated at a quarter of a million worldwide) were made by other companies. Although already patented, Meyers & Co. lost in court to the copiers, the judge rescinding his patent as unpatentable, opening the floodgates to the industry Meyers started. Since then, numerous vehicles of the general "dune buggy" or "beach buggy" body type, some VW-based, have been produced. An early example was the Imp by EMPI (1968–1970), which borrowed styling elements from the Chevrolet Corvette but was otherwise Manx-like. A later 1970s Manx clone was the Dune Runner from Dune Buggy Enterprises in Westminster, California. The Meyers company attempted to stay ahead of this seemingly unfair competition with the release of the distinctive, and harder-to-copy, Meyers Manx Mk II design.

B. F. Meyers & Co. also produced other Beetle-based vehicles, including the May 1970 Car & Driver magazine cover sporty Manx SR variant (street roadsters, borrowing some design ideas from the Porsche 914), the Meyers Tow'd (sometimes referred to as the "Manx Tow'd", a non-street-legal racing vehicle designed to be towed to the desert or beach), the Meyers Tow'dster (a street-legal hybrid of the two), and Meyers Resorter a.k.a. Meyers Turista (a small recreational or "resort" vehicle inspired by touring motorcycles). The Manx SR2 was a modified SR that was only produced by later manufacturers including Karma Coachworks, Heartland Motors and Manx Motors of MD. While the Tow'd was a minimal off-road racer and the SR/SR2 was a showy roadster, the Tow'dster was a compromise between a dune-capable vehicle and a more utilitarian street rod, and "paved the way for the rail-type buggy that was to dominate the buggy scene following the demise of the traditional Manx-type buggy."

The company ceased operation in 1971, after financial troubles, including with the Internal Revenue Service; and Bruce Meyers himself had already left his own company by then.

== Meyers Manx, Inc. ==
In 2000, Bruce Meyers created a resurgence of interest by founding Meyers Manx, Inc., based in Valley Center, California, and offering the Classic Manx series, a limited edition of 100.

In 2002, the Manxter 2+2 and Manxter DualSport were born. These two new models are modernizations of the original design, but are sized for a full-length Beetle pan (and the DualSport can also be based on a Super Beetle pan, unlike any other Manx model). Custom versions for higher-power engines and other variations are also available.

In the spring of 2009, Meyers re-introduced the shortened wheelbase. Named the Kick-Out Manx after the last action a surfer performs before reaching the shore, it is available in two models. The Kick-Out Manx Traditional is an updated version of the original Manx concept, with wider fenders, plus a front-hinged hood providing extra storage and easier access to electricals. The Kick-Out Manx S.S. (a.k.a. Kick-Out S.S. Manx) version is much more modern, with headlights flared into the hood, curved windshield, sculpted rear deck cover and twin roll hoops.

As of 2012, no Meyers Manx kits are based on the New Beetle or other modern Volkswagen cars, only particular original Beetle and Super Beetle models, which are rear-engine and rear-wheel-drive. No Meyers Manx kits are based on front-engine, front-wheel-drive platforms. Aftermarket frames are available, designed to duplicate VW chassis dimensions but provide improvements such as more modern or more rugged components.

== Meyers Manx, LLC ==
A 1972 Meyers Manx "remastered"

On 9 November 2020 it was announced that Bruce and Winnie Meyers had sold their business to venture capital investment firm Trousdale Ventures, who named automotive designer Freeman Thomas as CEO. The new company would be called Meyers Manx, LLC.

The new company began offering a "remastered" version of the original Manx, with higher quality fibreglass, better weather sealing, a locking rear luggage compartment, and various other refinements. The Meyers Manx Remastered was mainly offered as a complete, turnkey car, but was also offered as a kit.

=== Electric version ===
Meyers Manx 2.0 EV, dual-motor RWD 202 hp (151 kW) BEV, 0–60 mph (97 km/h) in 4.5 seconds, 40 kWh battery 300 mile range.

The Meyers Manx Resorter is a four-seater, long wheelbase NEV.

== See also ==
- Baja Bug
- Cal looker
- Cal-Style VW
- Formula Vee
- Volksrod
- Citroën Méhari
- BMC Mini Moke
- Fiat Ghia Jolly
- Volkswagen Country Buggy
- Renault Rodeo
- Meyers Manx
- Volkswagen Type 181
