= Cal looker =

Custom car trend

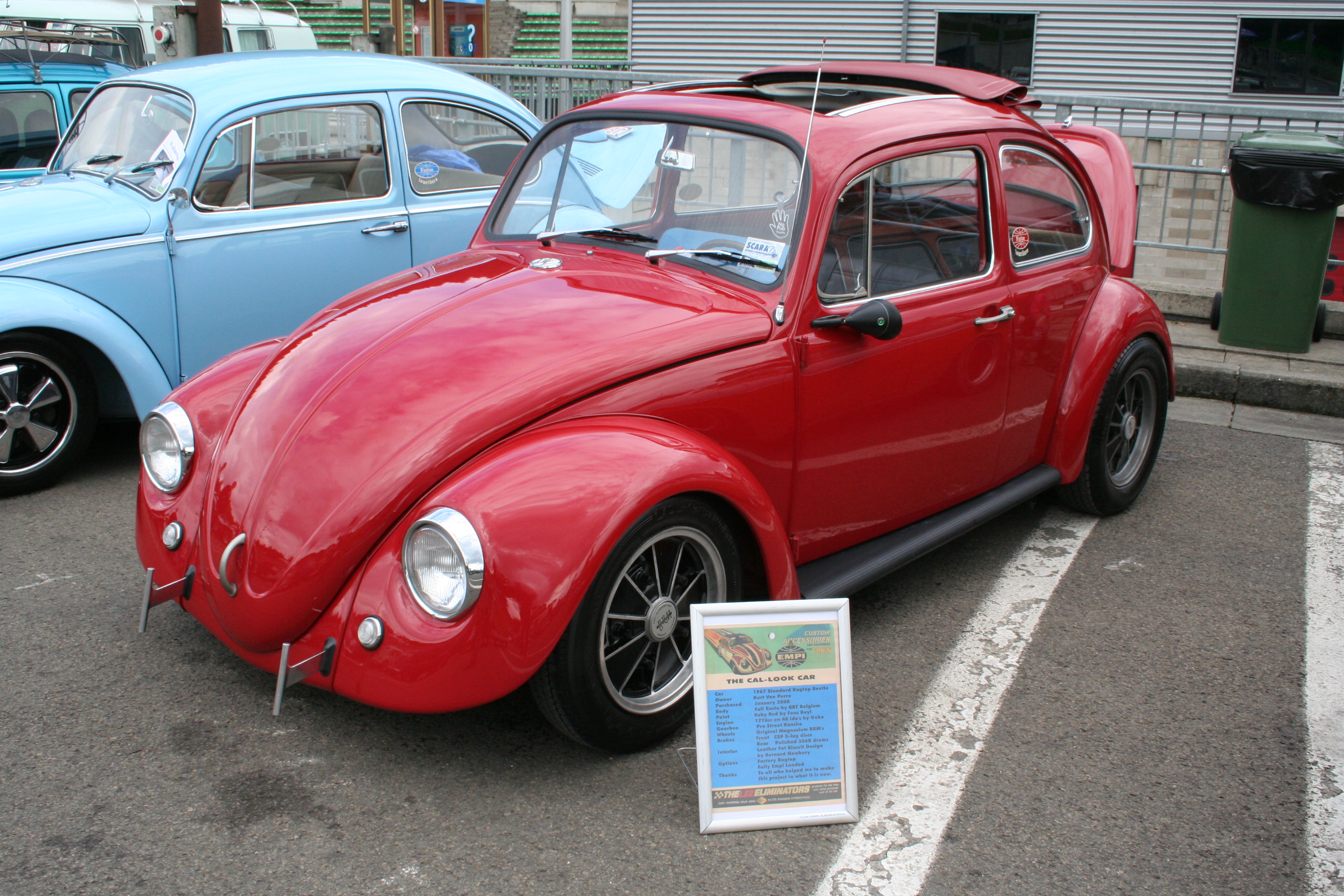
Type 1 modified in 1970s California look style

A Cal looker (California looker) is any air-cooled Volkswagen (most often the Type 1) modified in fashion originating in Orange County, California in the late 1960s.

== Common modifications ==
The Type 1 is popular with car customizers throughout the world not only because it is cheap and easy to work on, but because its iconic looks can be personalised and the flat four motor is so tuneable. Its very ubiquity makes even subtle changes noticeable; Popular modification categories include performance upgrades (engine swaps, turbocharging), aesthetic changes (lowering, custom paint, wheel upgrades), and functional improvements (upgraded brakes, suspension, lighting).

=== Exterior ===
There are many popular Beetle styles, from a Cal looker, to a Cal-Style VW. They vary between themselves but are similar in many ways. Also the California look has changed during the 30+ years of its lifespan. The most typical (and traditional) way to customize the exterior is to change the wheels and lower the front suspension of the car. The favorite wheels are period-style EMPI 5- or 8-spokes, Speedwell BRMs, Mahle "Gas Burners" or satin finish Porsche factory rims like Fuchs from a classic 911. One of the original California look modifications is to replace or remove the bumpers, side trim and vent wing window either to give a cleaner look or to reduce the curb weight; if bumpers are removed, T-bar pushbars are common. The stock bumpers are sometimes painted or powder coated.

There are many clubs dedicated to Cal look including the DKP in the USA which was one of the first clubs dedicated to true Cal-look cars. Today, the DKP still exists and the club is on their third generation. There are also currently many big Cal look VW clubs based in Europe including the DAS (Der Autobahn Scrapers) in Belgium, the DFL (Der Fieser Luftkühlers) in Germany and the JG54 Grünherz (Greenhearts) and the Aircooled Assassins (AA) in the UK and in Brazil DBC (Der Brazilian Cal look).

=== Cal-Style ===
A lowrider influenced Vintage VW that was lowered to the extreme for style and cruising called "dumped", "slammed" or "laid-out" The Cal-Style VW was originated in the streets of Los Angeles in the late 1970s. Los Angeles VW Car Clubs like the "Bugs Buddies" and the "Vintage Volksters" were the pioneers of this style building Cal-Style VW's to cruise LA landmarks like the original Tommy's Burgers, the iconic cruise spot Whittier Blvd, ELA and to impress the LA teen party crowd. The first documented example of a "Cal-Style" VW was 1980 when Rene Ruelas of lowrider car club fame the "Dukes" combined style and performance with his Karmann Ghia convertible; it was later owned by another, the early 1980s Cal-Style builder Robert "VWKIDD" Velis. By the late 1980s, the Cal-Style VW influence spread throughout Southern California and the world.

A Cal-Style VW was an all original VW typically painted in factory colors (two-tones are frowned on, unless original from the factory) that was lowered all the way around and kept all the chrome trim, bumpers, and subtle chrome lowrider influenced accessories like chrome gravel guards or rain deflectors, heavily influenced by the 1930s-1940s lowrider "bombas" Cal-Stylers saw growing up in their Los Angeles neighborhoods. The Cal-Style first called "Chicano style" then "Vintage Cal-Style" then around 1983-84 the term Cal-Style was universally accepted in the streets of Los Angeles. Cal-Style VW's wheels of choice were the Porsche Fuch alloys and the 5-spoke Empi's but unlike the Orange County Cal-Look the LA Cal-Style was about style and the wheels were fully polished or chromed for "bling".

=== Resto Cal ===
Resto Cal-look Volkswagens are air-cooled vehicles that may have a lowered stance yet appear to be restored to original condition (hence "resto"). The term was first used around 1987.

For resto Cal look, a roof rack, decklid rack and similar accessories are added and some are two-tone in color. There are many other aftermarket wheels and parts that can be added to the Type 1, including wing mirrors, chrome wipers, and badges. Rear light and front indicator lenses can also be changed. This is as far as a Cal look or resto Cal car will go. Some Resto-Cal VW's veer towards the Los Angeles Cal-Style VW [lowrider influenced], because of the stance, early Fuch alloys and the number of correct period accessories on the vehicle. There is a large tendency toward the resto Cal look because these cars can be fairly easily returned to a 'stock' unmodified status. Resto Cal cars also have the nickname "Buckaroo cars", a light-hearted dig about the number of items like luggage loaded onto the roof racks like the child's game from the 1980s. Enthusiast sites such as BugMe.co.uk show what sort of modifications are often done to create or restore a resto Cal Beetle.

=== Other Volkswagens ===
The Cal look aesthetic has been applied to other Volkswagens, such as the Type 3 and Karmann Ghia, but is not, and never has been, associated with VW camper vans and buses. The same modifications are used, with the same end result. Some Volkswagen enthusiasts are branching out into turning Beetles (and other Volkswagens) into leadsleds, Hood-Rides and Volksrods. Others are turning to later water-cooled vehicles and the import scene, with the Volkswagen Caddy having a cult following. Others have exported the Cal look onto non-Volkswagens.

== Non-Volkswagens ==
The Cal look has also been exported to non Volkswagen vehicles, such as the Hillman Imp, Fiat 500, Porsche 356, early Porsche 911, its VW-based sisters and even the BMW 2002 and Lada VAZ-2101. These cars have the same modifications as their Volkswagen counterparts and are seen as alternatives to the Beetle, either due to cost or the desire to be different.

== See also ==
- Baja Bug
- Formula Vee
- Meyers Manx
- Volksrod
