= Chen Le-han =

- 陳樂涵
- Photographed in 2026
- Born: Chen Han-Chang (Chinese: 陳漢章); 1979 (age 46–47)
- Education: College
- Occupations: Attorney, prosecutor
- Years active: 2013-
- Organization(s): Concordia Law Firm, Taiwan New Taipei District Prosecutors Office
- Known for: Thento union violent debt collecting, Amphetamine labs, poisoning incident, feminine dressing

Chen Le-han (Chinese: 陳樂涵, born 20 July 1979), nicknamed Rakuraku (Chinese: 樂樂) and formerly Chen Han-Chang (Chinese: 陳漢章), is a Taiwanese attorney and former prosecutor. While she identified as a woman since youth, Chen did not openly share her true gender identity until her 40s, and has lived as a woman since then. During her time as a prosecutor, Chen was nicknamed "the most beautiful prosecutor" (Chinese: 最美檢察官) in Taiwan.

== Biography ==
Chen Le-han was born in 1979. During her school years, Chen wore her mother's clothes, changing near school. Chen majored in law in college, and aspired to become a legal professional to meet her parents' expectations for her career. Chen was briefly an editor for a car tuning magazine, but eventually focused on preparing for her magistrate exam. (Note: In Taiwan, magistrate (司法官) refers to judges and prosecutors. Their entrance exams are usually administered jointly.) While studying for the exam, she met Cher and promised to marry her once she became a legal professional. Chen passed the exam and became a prosecutor after five years, and married Cher.

Chen joined the Taiwan New Taipei District Prosecutors Office in 2013 and worked in the drug enforcement task force. Some of her notable investigations included violent debt-collecting groups from Thento union, cracking down on the largest amphetamine lab in Taiwanese history, and a poisoning incident.

Chen dressed in a masculine style to conform to the gender role expected of people designated male in Taiwanese society, She kept her true gender identity and dressing preference a secret until she was 40, when she traveled to Kyoto. During the time in Kyoto, she was able to live openly as a woman in a foreign country. Before returning to Taiwan, Chen experienced a severe depression. She later realised that her depression stemmed from gender dysphoria and that her gender identity was female. From then on, she decided to live as a woman openly.

Chen came out to Cher and discussed her future plans with her. Chen also began expressing her gender identity by changing her dressing, hairstyle, and discussing related topics to help others understand. Chen and her family went through years of conflict after coming out. Their relationship only began to improve after the media reported her story Cher started supporting her thereafter, while her former colleagues in the prosecutor's office fully supported her.

Chen dressed femininely, and went viral for her attractive appearance and clothing advice on social media. The media often referred to her as the most beautiful prosecutor in Taiwan (最美檢察官). Chen has since become a key opinion leader within the transgender community.

She left her position as a prosecutor and founded a law firm called Concordia Law Firm (敦合法律事務所) in 2025. On 25 April 2026, Chen changed her name from Chen Han-Chang to Chen Le-han.
