= Luis Resto =

Luis Resto may refer to:

- Luis Resto (boxer) (born 1955), Puerto Rican former welterweight boxer
- Luis Resto (musician) (born 1961), Detroit-based musician, producer and keyboardist
