= EMPI (automotive) =

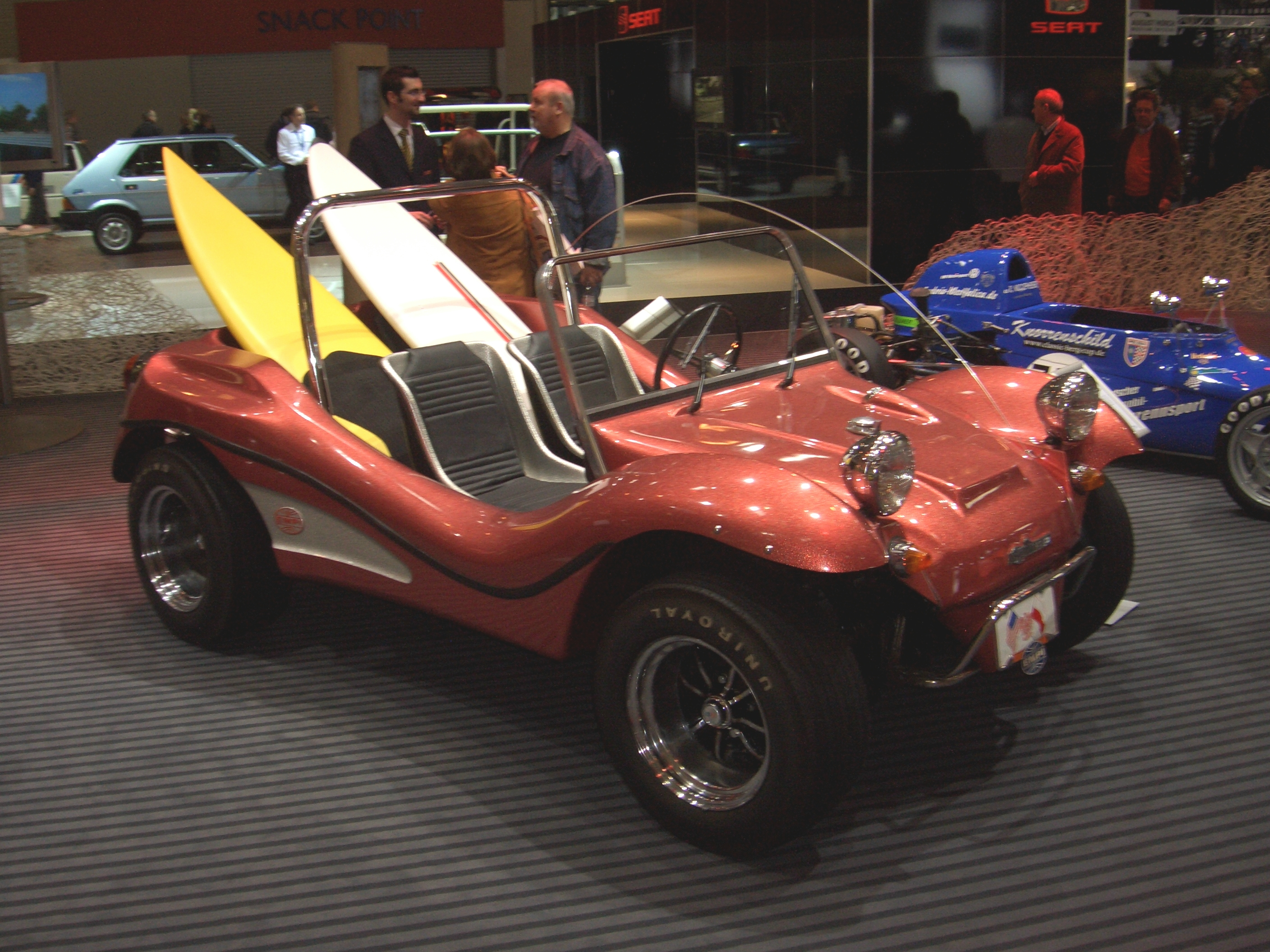

EMPI is a company that produces aftermarket performance parts for various air-cooled Volkswagens. EMPI was not one of the brands that led to the demise of B. F. Meyers & Co., the company that produced the Meyers Manx (one of the first air-cooled Volkswagen based buggies). One of its products was the EMPI Imp, a manx-type dune buggy.

The originally owned company was started by Joe Vittone in the 1956. Vittone sold EMPI to Filter Dynamics in 1970, and it closed in 1974, but EMPI still lives on today under new ownership. EMPI is an acronym for European Motor Products Incorporated.
