= Cruising (driving) =

Traveling by car for pleasure

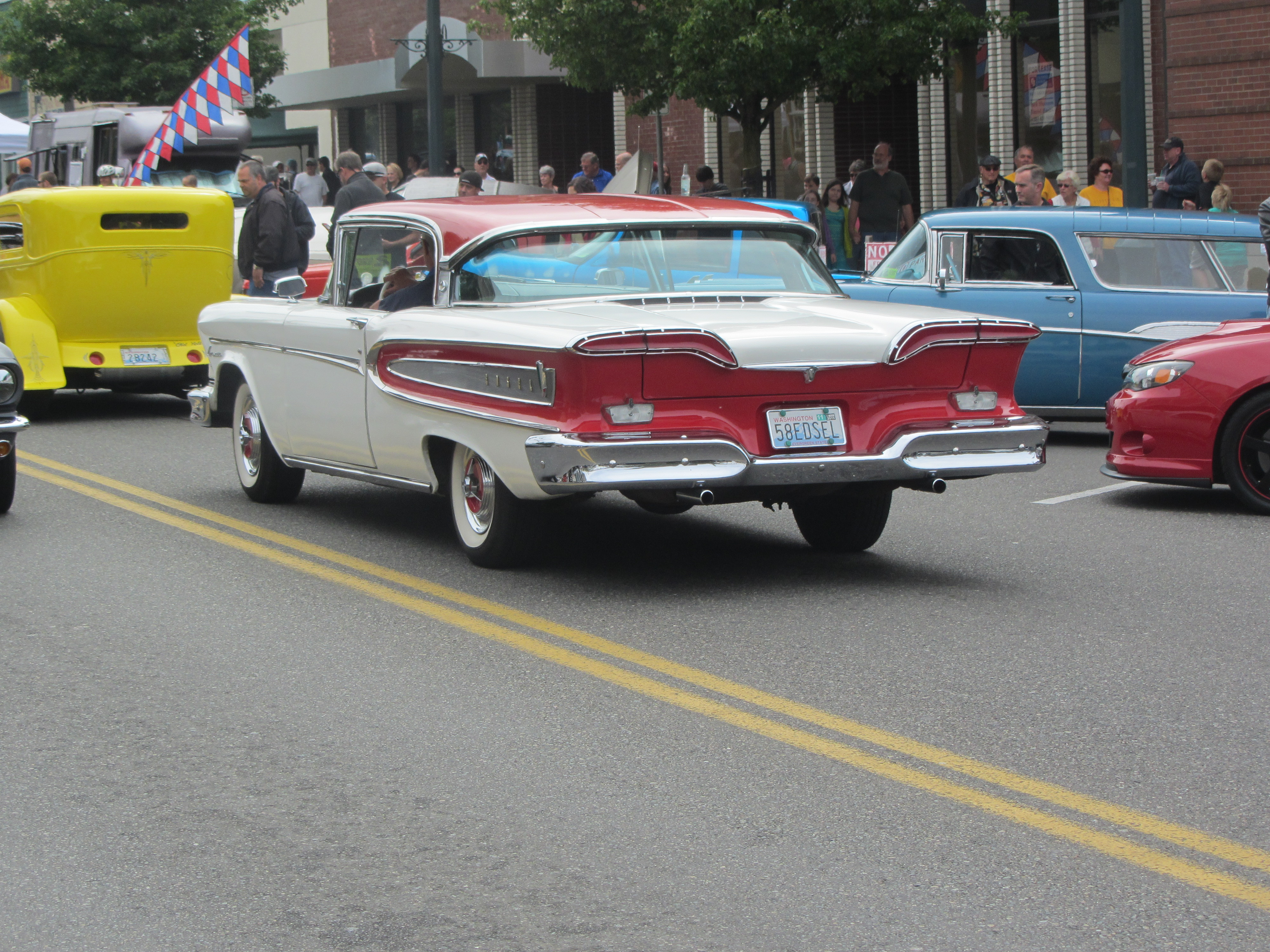
Cruising in Everett, Washington

Cruising is a social activity that primarily consists of driving a car. Cruising is distinguished from regular driving by the social and recreational nature of the activity, which is characterized by an impulsively random, often aimless course. A popular route (or "strip") is often the focus of cruising. Cruising can be an expression of the freedom of possessing a driver's license. "Cruise nights" are evenings during which cars drive slowly.

A cruise can be a meeting of car enthusiasts at a predetermined location, organized predominantly through the internet (in recent times) but also largely through mobile phone, word of mouth or simply by a cruise being established enough that it becomes a regular event.

== United States ==
=== History ===
There is no clear-cut date when casual driving turned into cruising along a specific route, although it generally began in the years after World War II with youths of Mexican heritage driving lowriders in Southern California, and it rapidly became a popular teenage activity.

Cruising culture was an evolution of old traditions of strolling down Main Street or around the town square. Although cruising was predominantly boys showing off their cars (ostensibly to meet girls), groups of girls joined in cruising as well. One appeal of cruising was that youths could evade the supervision of parents and family.

Driving slowly down long, straight streets, preferably with many traffic lights to increase opportunities to talk to other cruisers or pedestrians, was only one part of cruising. Cruisers would also gather in parking lots, particularly those of drive-ins. As a Tucson journalist noted, "Cruisers, like moths and June bugs, eventually congregate around brightly lighted areas." Cruisers were also apt to arrange impromptu street races with other cruisers.

As early as the 1960s, some towns established ordinances to prohibit driving through parking lots without stopping and the police issued tickets for loitering and curfew violations. Increasingly, cruisers would travel from wider areas to gather on popular strips, with police viewing these visitors as troublemakers. Reports of clashes between groups of cruisers began to appear in local newspapers.

However, cruising continued to remain popular, with wildly painted vans and pickup trucks joining hot rods and muscle cars in the 1970s. In many locales, there was a generally positive relationship with law enforcement. Racing in populated areas was discouraged by police surveillance and traffic, but cruisers engaged in other games such as mooning onlookers, laying rubber when a signal turned green, and "chinese fire drills" in which all occupants of a car stopped at a light would get out, run around the car, and jump back in.

There was some decline in cruising in the 1970s, possibly connected to the rise of gas prices but also due to a growing change in community attitudes toward cruising. The San Francisco Bay Area had a "cruising summit" in 1977 for area police to discuss "our mutual problems with cruising". The gathering numbers of vehicles and increases in tensions and violence led many communities to begin looking for ways to discourage cruising, despite many adults retaining a permissive acceptance of cruising with nostalgia for their own cruising days. Although business merchants and shoppers had been inconvenienced for years by cruisers, tolerance had dissipated and law enforcement was encouraged to step in.

During the summer of 1974, Los Angeles police began cracking down on cruising, first by banning parking along Van Nuys Boulevard and then in August making it a one-way street. The following summer, as many as 15,000 youths from as far away as San Diego converged on Van Nuys, encouraged by local disc jockeys. A similar crackdown on Whittier Boulevard led to the formation of a cruiser's rights group. Police barricaded portions of Whittier in an attempt to disrupt cruising, but even local adults objected to this practice. Other measures were tried, such as shutting portions of Whittier down completely at night. Cruisers moved to Highland Avenue, resulting in the arrest of 170 during the second weekend of September 1979. The following summer, a section of Van Nuys was closed after 9 p.m. The rationale for the blockade was that it only required fifteen police to close the road, but they would need at least 150 officers to police the 15,000 cruisers who had gathered there.

As quickly as one strip became unusable, cruisers would find new sites. It became a persistent battle between authorities and cruisers. In 1982, the California State Legislature passed a law that gave cities express sanction to shut down streets being used for cruising, when driving "for purposes of socializing and assembling interferes with the conduct of businesses, wastes precious energy resources, impedes the progress of general traffic and emergency vehicles, and promotes the generation of local concentrations of air pollution and undesirable noise levels".

Efforts to stop cruising continued, with increasing blockades and mass arrests. In 1985, random checkpoints began to appear, with police stopping cars passing the spot more than once in a given timeframe. Computers were added in 1988 to help track the cars. New curfews for minors were established. Cruising in southern California was generally suppressed by 1990. Other regions used tactics similar to southern California's, with similar mixed results. Police in Galveston, Texas began arresting cruisers, but had to back down in the face of parental complaints. Joplin, Missouri attempted a ban on cruising, but had to repeal it. Merchants in Portland, Oregon complained that they were losing business because of the crackdowns. Multiple towns across the U.S. adopted the checkpoint system.

Other towns tried creative alternatives, such as Laurel, Mississippi and Princeton, West Virginia, which both channeled cruisers onto routes that would not interfere with local businesses. Setting aside parking lots specifically for cruisers was tried in Cedar Rapids, Iowa and Columbus, Indiana. The town of Big Stone Gap, Virginia chose to embrace cruising, awarding prizes for the best customized vehicles.

Cities continue to struggle with the problems of cruising into the 2000s. In 2006, Milwaukee, Wisconsin even explored letting police confiscate cruisers' cars.

While communities try to prevent impromptu cruising, multiple towns have embraced organized cruising revivals. The Woodward Dream Cruise occurs on the third Saturday in August along the original cruising strip in Detroit's northern suburbs. The event is a tribute to the classic Woodward cruisers and attracts approximately 1 million people and 40,000 muscle cars, street rods, and custom, collector, and special interest vehicles. Waukegan, Illinois, has an annual summer cruising festival historically known as "Scoop the Loop" (officially shortened to "Scoop" since 2014) and Modesto, California celebrates "Graffiti Summer" with an annual cruise parade. Renton, Washington hosts "Cruz the Loop" each summer, and in 2020 erected a sculpture to honor cruising the loop.

In June 2022, the San Jose, California city council repealed the prohibition on cruising. In a reversal from 1982, in 2023 the California State Legislature repealed its former act which authorized cities or counties to restrict cruising or lowrider vehicles, thus legalizing lowriding and cruising throughout the state. Sacramento, the capital of California, changed the name of a scenic street to Lowrider Lane to show its support of lowrider culture.

Some ethnic groups identify with lifestyles related to cruising, such as the Hispanos of New Mexico, Chicanos, and Mexican-Americans of the Southwestern United States along U.S. Route 66. Meets, like those at lowrider and auto shows, are popular across the United States and worldwide in large part due to these ethnic communities.

=== Well-known strips ===
One of the oldest cruising strips in East Los Angeles is located on Whittier Boulevard. Cruising on this strip became a popular pastime among lowriders during the 1940s before spreading to surrounding neighborhoods in the 1950s. Van Nuys Boulevard in the central San Fernando Valley has been a popular cruising strip since the 1950s; the 1979 film Van Nuys Blvd. depicted the cruising culture on the strip. In the late 1970s, the Wednesday night cruise on Van Nuys attracted up to 40,000 cars. Sunset Boulevard was another popular cruise strip. In the late 1960s and early 1970s, Crenshaw Boulevard was a popular cruising strip for South Los Angeles' African-American communities.

Perhaps the most famous cruising strip (or main drag), however, is McHenry Avenue in Modesto, California. The cruising culture of the late 1950s and early 1960s was depicted in the film American Graffiti. The film was set (but not actually filmed) in director George Lucas's hometown of Modesto, which also hosts an annual "Graffiti Summer" celebration in the film's honor.

Cruising in Detroit was popular from the 1950s to the 1970s in the city's northern suburbs along M-1 (Woodward Avenue), from Ferndale north to Pontiac. Cruising along Woodward reached its peak in the mid-1960s, with muscle car competitions that were covered by journalists from Car and Driver, Motor Trend, and CBS World News Roundup. Other popular cruising strips in the Detroit area include US 24 (Telegraph Road) from 12 Mile Road in Southfield to Michigan Avenue in Dearborn, and M-3 (Gratiot Avenue) on the East Side.

== United Kingdom ==
=== Description ===
There are two main types of cruise: regular cruises, also known as meets, and one-off cruises. The events that take place are similar; cars meet in car parks, park up or cruise (drive slowly) around the car park while people socialise – often meeting people from cruise websites, show off their cars and admire others' cars. If there is enough space there are often drag races, burnouts, and doughnuts.

=== Meets ===
A meet is a regular gathering, usually weekly or monthly, where the time and place is freely publicised and well known. It is becoming more common these days for these events to be referred to incorrectly as cruises.

=== One-off cruises ===
A one-off cruise is an event organised by a particular group of people or club which would usually be advertised through cruise websites. The final destination of the cruise is often kept secret; it is known only to the convoy leaders in an attempt to keep the cruise unknown to the police until there are a large enough numbers of people at the cruise to make it difficult to disperse.

One-off cruises tend to be larger than meets, but larger meets may have magazine attendance. This type of cruise is increasing in recent times due to increased police interest in regular, established cruises.

Some large cruises operate a "convoy-only" policy.

=== Locations ===
Cruises are generally held in retail parks due to the large open car parks needed to accommodate high attendance numbers (sometimes more than 500 cars). Naturally, with many cruises situated in retail parks, most cruise locations are also in close proximity to fast food restaurants such as McDonald's or Burger King.

=== Cruising and the law ===
A standard sign prohibiting cruising in New Zealand

Although cruising is often not a crime in itself, there are many illegal activities associated with it, and as such cruises are often monitored by the police or even closed. The most commonly cited reasons for breaking up cruises are breach of the peace, caused by loud exhausts and sound systems disturbing local residents, and dangerous driving (such as street racing, burnouts and doughnuts). Police also claim that cruises are used as cover for drug dealing and are attended by stolen or otherwise illegal cars. More recently, police have been using ASBO laws which enable them to seize and impound cars if anti-social behaviour is taking place or if a group refuses to disperse from an area.

As a result of increased police powers, legal cruises have been established such as Weston Wheels, although these tend to resemble car shows with camping, music stages and trade stalls. This passive, organised nature often does not satisfy the desires of cruisers, so illegal cruising continues.

Many city councils have successfully placed court injunctions to prevent boy racers parking cars in areas that have been popular with them.

=== Magazines ===
Cruising and modifying have long been represented in the commercial magazines Max Power, Fast Car and Redline. In mid-2006, Max Power, the magazine that brought cruises to the forefront, abandoned the scene – preferring to concentrate on "dream" cars such as Nissan Skylines. Long-time rival Fast Car assumed Max Power's position and now covers multiple cruises across the UK in each edition.

== See also ==
- Back to the Bricks
- Car customizing
- Cal-Style VW
- Hot rod
- Motorist day, car-related observance celebrating the institution of driving
- Import scene
- Street racing

=== Sweden ===
- Raggare

=== UK and Republic of Ireland ===
- Boy racer
- Chav
- Supercar Season

=== Oceania ===
- Bogan
- Hoon
