= Rat rod =

Style of vehicle customization

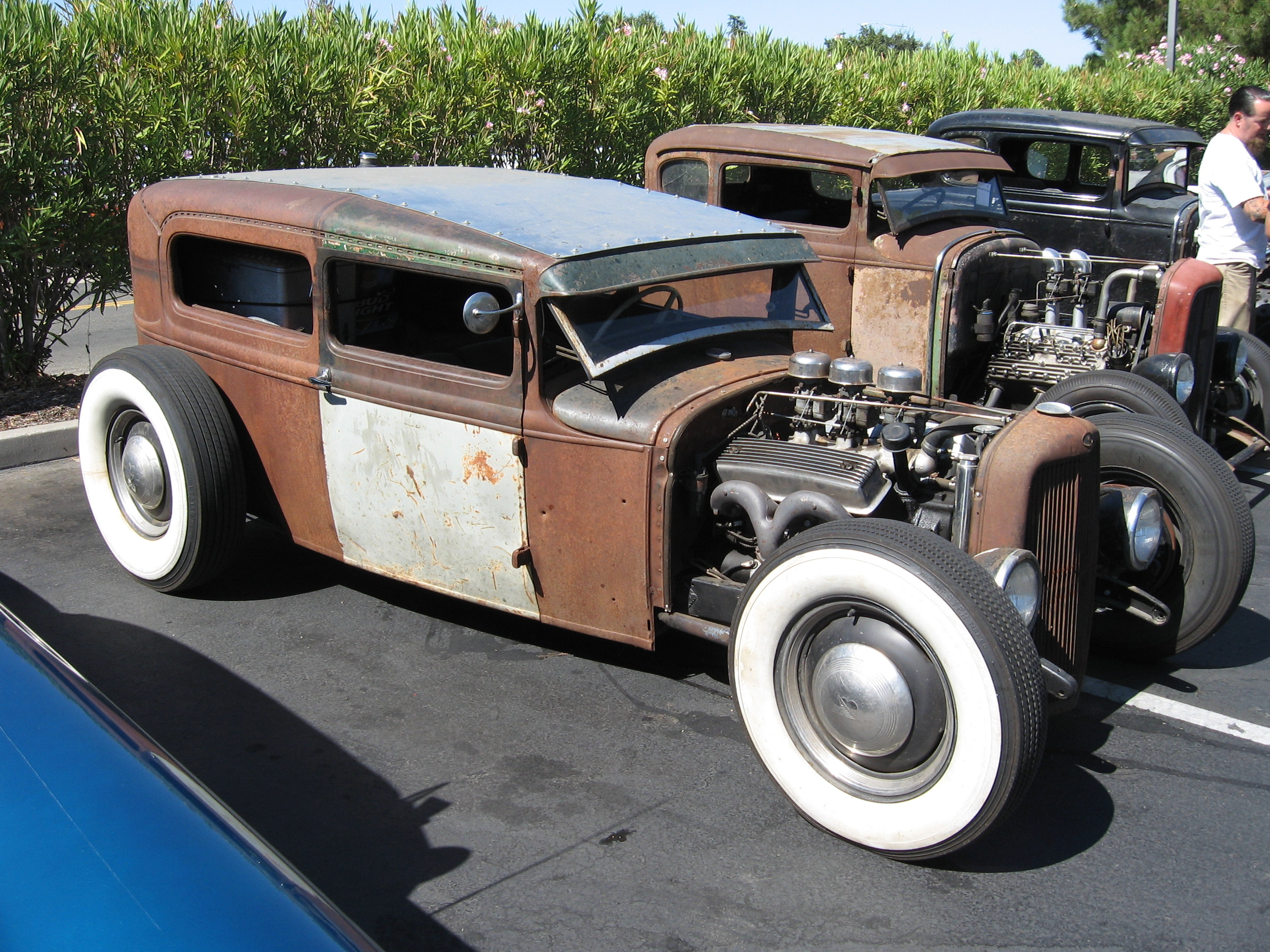
An example of a rat rod

A rat rod, as usually known today, is a custom car with a deliberately worn-down, unfinished appearance, typically lacking paint, showing rust, and made from cheap or cast-off parts. These parts can include non-automotive items that have been repurposed, such as a rifle used as a gear shifter, wrenches as door handles, or hand saws as sun visors. Whether or not so appointed, the rat rod uniquely conveys its builder’s imagination.

The term has also been applied to a style of hot rod or custom car that broadly imitates or exaggerates the early hot rods of the mid-twentieth century, unlike the "traditional" hot rod, which is one built at that time or a close re-creation of one of such.

== Definition ==
Originally, rat rods were a counter-reaction to the high-priced "customs" and typical hot rods, many of which were seldom driven and served only a decorative purpose. The rat rod's inception signified a throwback to the hot rods of the earlier days of hot-rod culture—built according to the owner's abilities and with the intention of being driven. Rat rods are meant to loosely imitate, in both form and function, the "traditional" hot rods of the era. Biker, greaser, rockabilly, psychobilly, and punk sub-cultures are often cited as influences that shaped rat rodding.

The typical rat rod is a late-1920s through to late-1950s coupe or roadster, but sometimes a truck or sedan. Many early (pre-World War II) vehicles were not built with fenders, hoods, running boards, and bumpers. The bodies are frequently channeled over the frame and sectioned, or the roofs are chopped, for a lower profile. Later-era post-war vehicles were rarely constructed without fenders and were often customized in the fashion of kustoms, leadsleds, and lowriders; Maltese crosses, skulls, and other accessories were often added. The owner of the vehicle was typically responsible for most, or all, of the work present in the vehicle.

Recently, using the term "rat rod" has been derided as being incorrect when describing any vehicle that appears unfinished or is built simply to be driven.

Rodding scribe Pat Ganahl took a broad look at the rat rod trend and had this to say:

I see what are referred to as Rat Rods today comprising three elements: First are the traditional rods and customs. Those are cars built the way rods were built in the '30s, '40s, and early '50s, with a primary emphasis on low-buck and home-built, using period-correct components ranging from flathead to nailhead engines, wide whitewall tires to skinny blackwall bias-plies, and black primer to hand-rubbed paint.

Second are what I personally call Rat Rods, as a positive term ... They're artistic, fun, and sensational reinterpretations of late-'40s/early-'50s hot rodding as a culture that includes music, clothing, hairstyles, and tattoos. The cars are low, loud, chopped ... with giant rear tires, lots of carburetors, open pipes, and tall gearshifts. The customs can have slit windows and scrape the ground. Few cars in the '50s looked like this, but today they can, in countless creative and fun ways.

== Origins ==
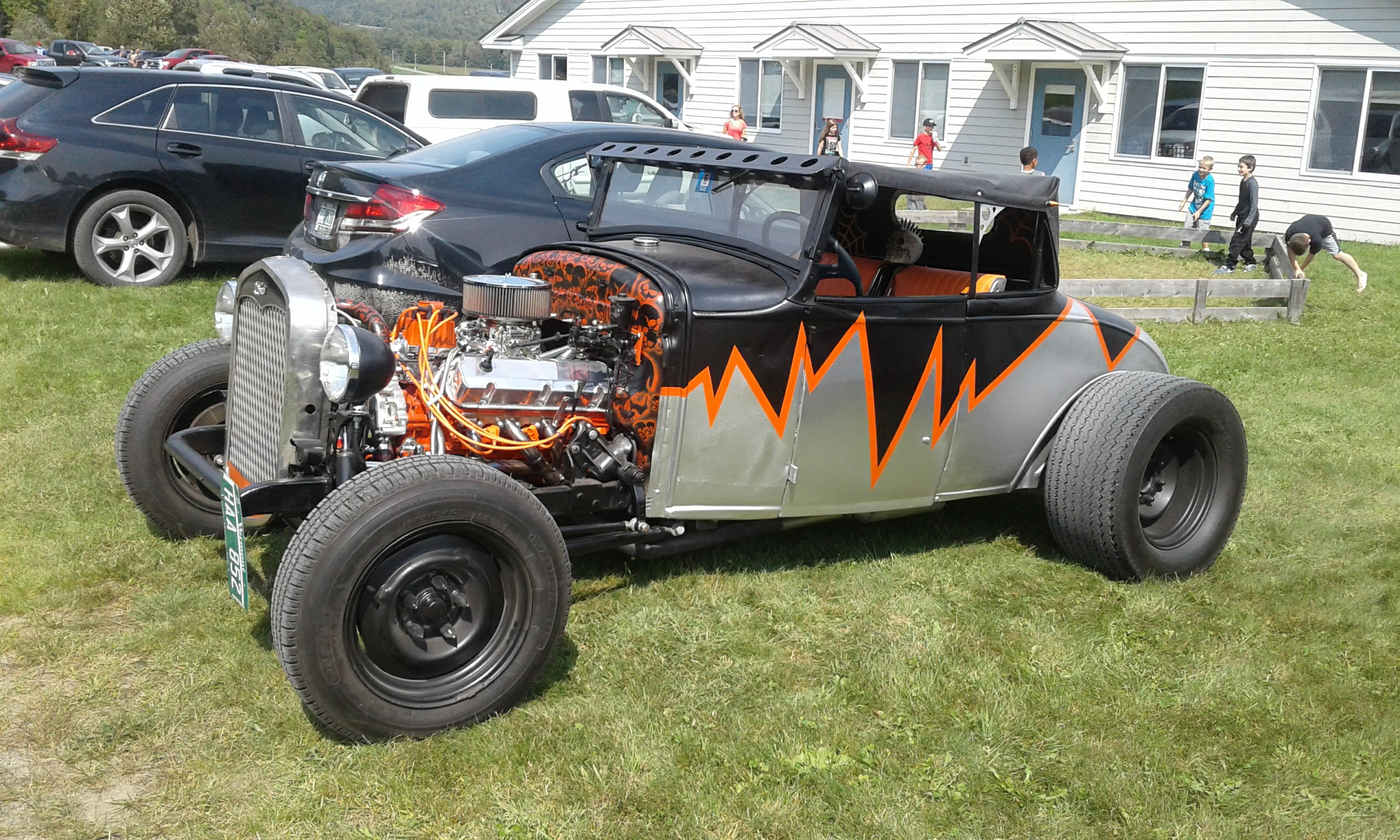
1932 Ford coupe rat rod in Sheffield, Vermont.

The December 1972 issue of Rod & Custom Magazine was dedicated to the "beater", a low-budget alternative to the early car models that were slick and customized. Due to the beater's cheap upholstery, primer covering (instead of paint), and lack of chrome or polished metals, it has been considered a progenitor of the rat rod.

The origin of the term "rat rod" is the subject of dispute, but was coined by Anthony Casteneda in the Shifters So. Cal. car club. In the early 1990s, he thought of the word when they were interviewed in a Rod & Custom magazine article. Anthony stated that to him and his car club, their traditional hot rods were lacking certain elements like paint and/or upholstery, and were similar to rat bikes of their time period, thus the name Rat Rods.

Jose Mejia of San Francisco along with the Shifters So.Cal. started a trend of younger guys that were in to Rockabilly music, dressed in a 1950s Greaser style, and built period correct pre war hot rods, reminiscent of the 1940s, 50's, and early 60s. This trend started in southern California by Anthony Casteneda, Kevan Sledge, Alex "Axle" Idzardi, Mark "Marky" Idzardi, Jeff Vodden, Victor Jimenez, Jeff "Skinny" Coleman, Jimmy White, and Rob Neilson. Soon after the Rod & Custom Magazine article featured the Shifters, magazines such as Burn Out, Continental Restyling, Hot Rod, Cal, and Hop Up featured the club, and this new phenomenon hit not only southern California, but cities all over the nation. Opinions regarding the term's origins were based in one of the following perspectives: Years later, in 1998, one of many articles was written in Hot Rod Magazine, this was done by automotive journalist Gray Baskerville, about cars that, at that time, continued to be covered by primer; or, the first rat rod was owned by artist, Robert Williams, who had a '32 Ford Roadster that was painted in primer. However, Hot Rod magazine has verified the latter view. Gray's use of the term was in relation to "Rat Bikes," motorcycles that were assembled from spare parts, to be enjoyed and ridden, and not necessarily for the display of the builder's skills. It is believed that the term is likely to have originally been used in a derogatory or pejorative sense, as this remains the case among sections of the hot rod community; however, the term has also been adopted in a positive light by other parts of the sub-culture.

== General ==
=== Chassis ===
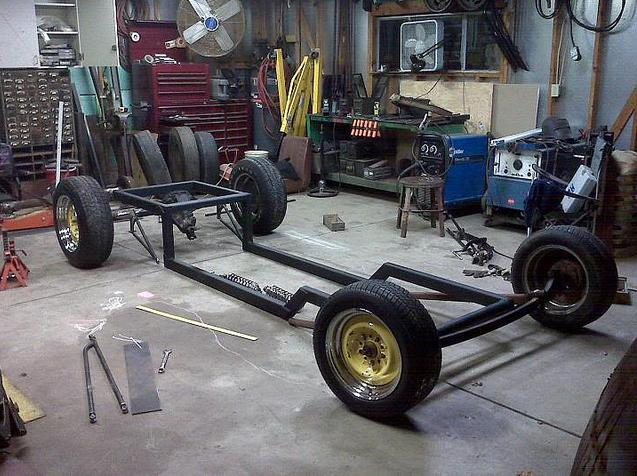
Custom frame

Frames from older cars or light trucks are sometimes preferred for rat rod conversions due to the chassis that is used for these types of vehicles—the chassis type provides a sturdy base for subsequent alterations. Older cars in poor condition are often advertised as candidates for rat rod conversions and, in some cases, the owner will purchase a custom frame, or design and build it themself. In other cases, a rat rodder may use a small pick-up chassis, such as a Chevy S-10 or Dodge Dakota, to insert into an older car body, in order to create a vehicle that features the look of a classic rat rod, while also maintaining the reliability of a modern vehicle.

=== Paint and finish ===
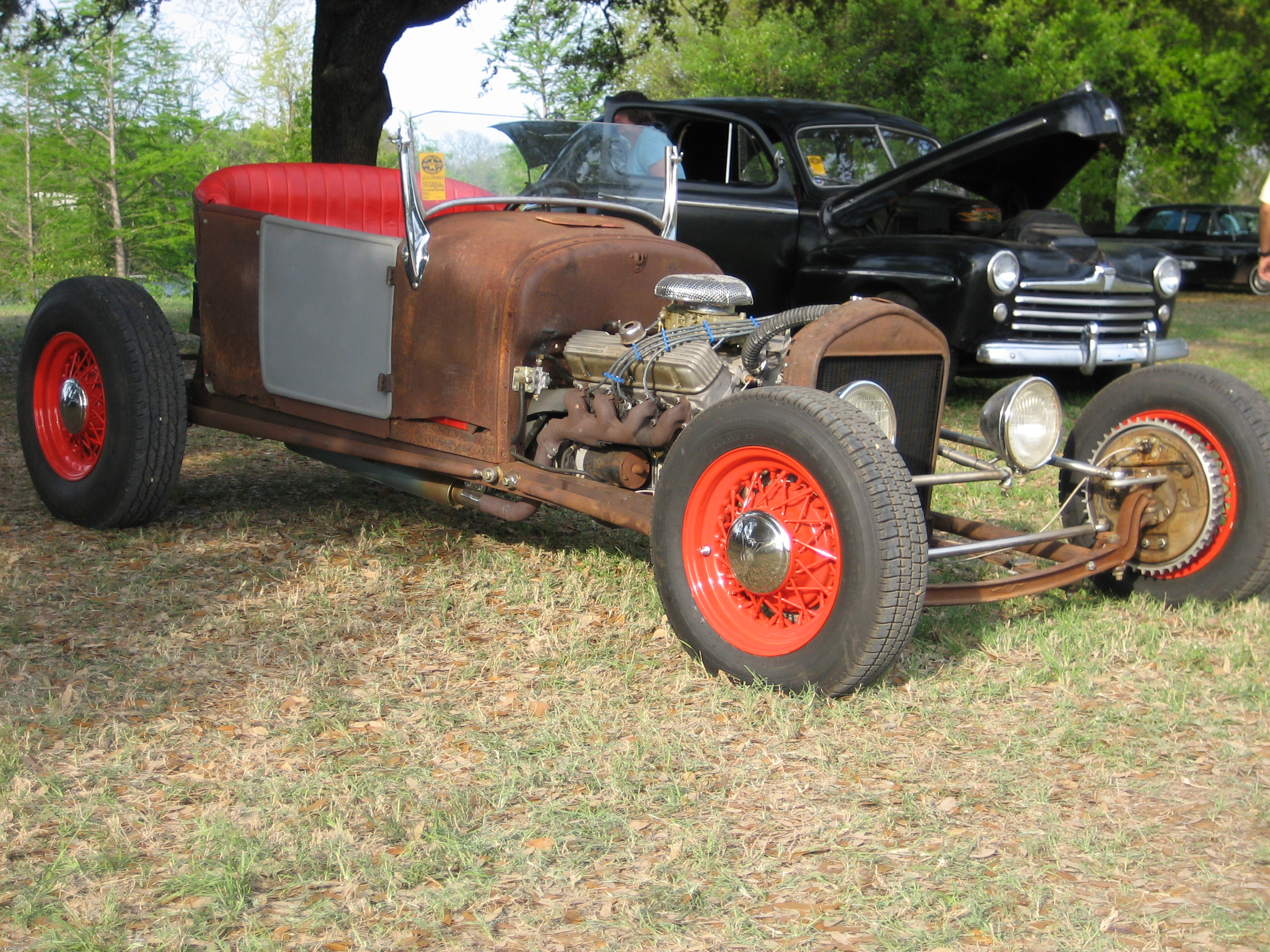
Typical "rough" finish of rat rods.

Rat rods often appear unfinished and, at most, primer-only paint jobs are applied; satin, or matte, black and other flat colors are also common. "Natural patina" (the original paint job, with rust, blemishes, and sometimes bullet holes, left intact); a patchwork of original paint and primer; or bare metal, in rusty or oiled varieties, with no finish at all are some of the other finishes that may be used—such finishes honor the anti-restoration slogan that "it's only original once". Contrary to the aesthetic of many car builders, rust is often acceptable and appreciated by rat rod owners. Owners will also often apply free-hand pinstriping to their rat rods.

Early low-budget hot rods were often long term "works in progress" and as such final finishing treatments (such as metal prep, paint, and trim) remained in the future, and the Rat Rod imitates this aesthetic.

=== Interior ===
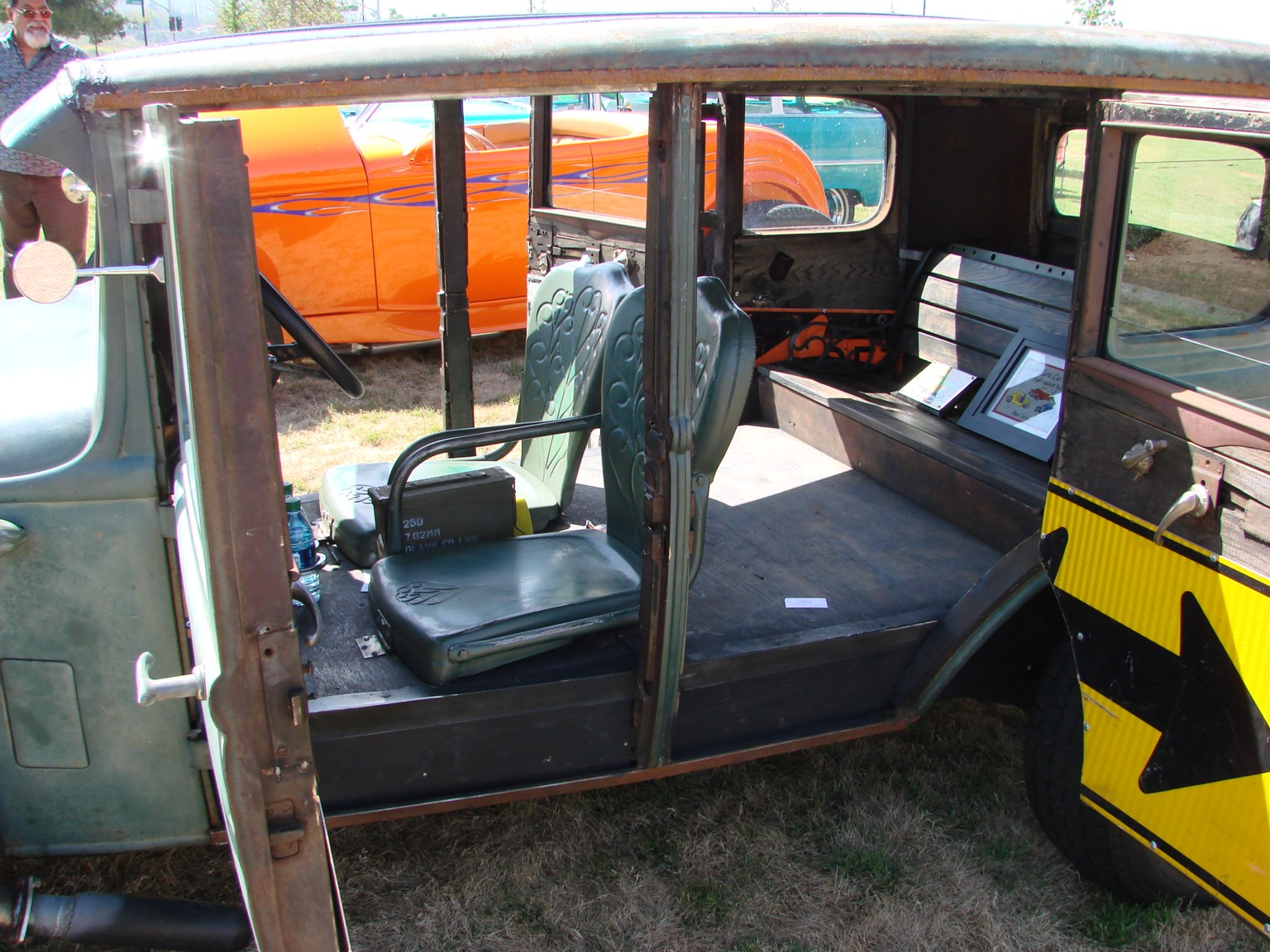
Interior of a rat rod, using lawn chairs as seats and a cut up street sign as a door panel

Interiors of rat rods can range from spartan to fully finished, though this is typically the final phase of construction. Mexican blankets and bomber seats form the basis of many rat rod interiors, and most are designed to be functional without many comforts; although, this will vary in accordance with the owner's taste. Some owners also repurpose other items to build their interior, such as road signs, license plates, old bottles, bike chains and more.

=== Drivetrain ===
Though a variety of engines may be used, the most common layout of engine used in rat rods is the V8 engine. Popular choices include Ford Flathead V8s, early Chrysler Hemi engines, or more modern small block V8 engines from any manufacturer (Chevrolet is a common choice of small block engine). Straight-8s straight-6s, straight-4, and V6s are also fairly commonly used in the construction of rat rods—these engines may exhibit varying displacements and modifications. While diesel engines are occasionally used, these engines are rarely fitted with emission controls, as such a feature was not part of the original construction, or the feature was not required under special license.

Most rat rods are rear-wheel drive, with an open driveline. The rear-ends and the transmissions are typically passenger vehicle pieces.

=== Suspension ===
A beam axle is the most commonly used type of front suspension, due to its appearance when exposed without fenders on a vehicle with open front suspension. Independent front suspension is rarely used and most rat rods use a 1928-1948 Ford I-beam axle, with a transverse leaf spring. Although any rear axle can be used in a rat rod, the Ford rear end has been preferred for years due to the availability of spare parts. "...Ford 9-inchers are the most used rear ends in nearly every form of racing and most high-performance street vehicles ..."

Spring types in the front and rear can be transverse, parallel or coil setups—parallel is not used as frequently as the more common single-spring transverse setup and coil springs are still occasionally seen even though this spring type is less popular for aesthetic reasons. Rat rods will often be built with airbag suspension, thereby allowing the driver to raise and lower the car; this can be a useful feature due to the extremely low ground clearance of many rat rods.

In many cases, the front suspension is mounted a considerable distance forward of the radiator, a practice that may be derived from the construction of early drag racing cars.

== Modern influence ==
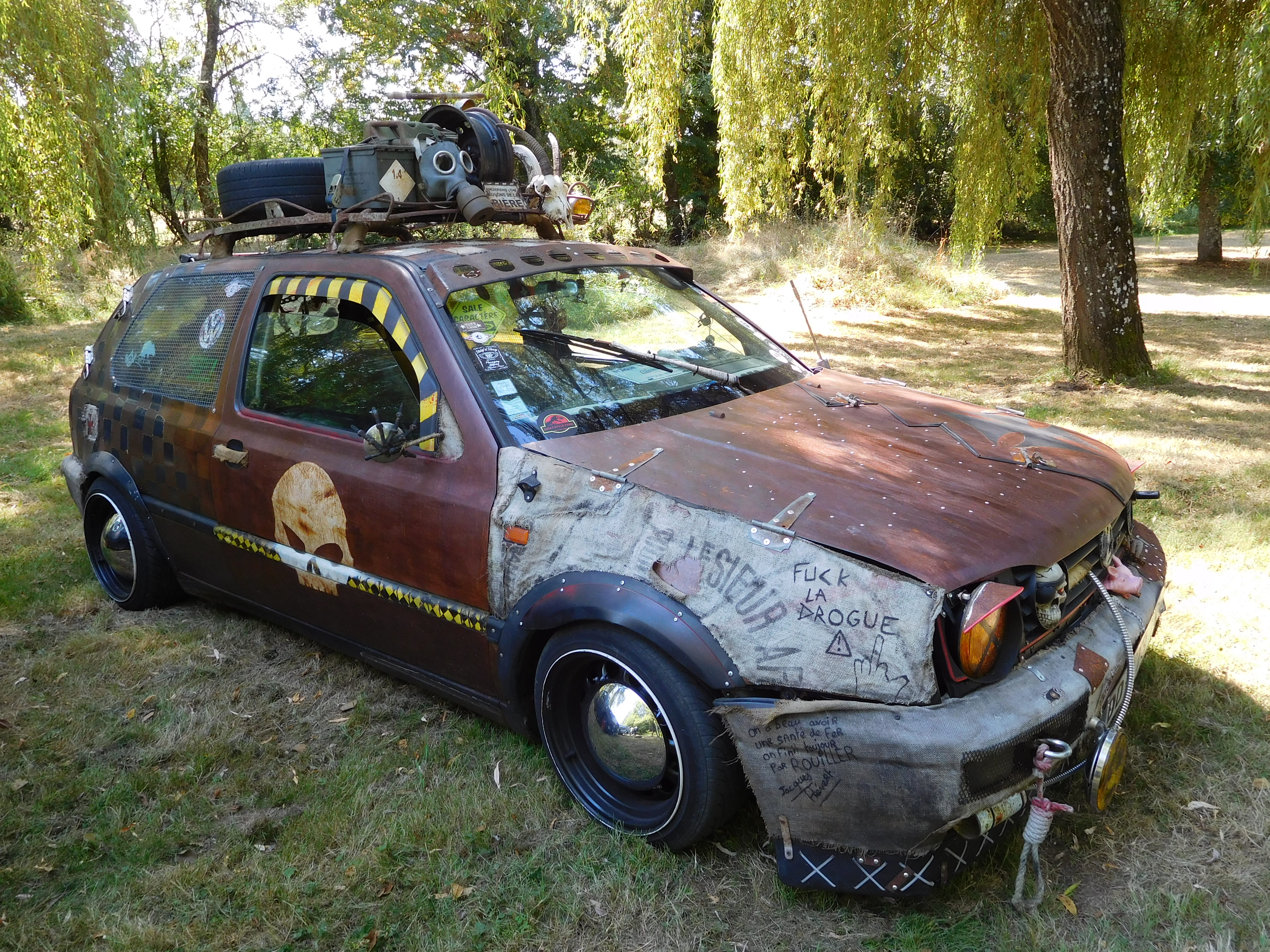
A 1990s-era Volkswagen Golf, modified in a similar style to rat rods

The rat rod style of automobile customization enjoyed a resurgence in popularity beginning in the 1990s. Since the early 2000s, a growing number of automotive enthusiasts not directly associated with any form of organized motorsport have combined the functional principles of rat rod architecture with certain aesthetic factors commonly seen in amateur motorsport such as missing or severely damaged body panels, the use of improvised materials to temporarily repair body damage incurred during a racing or drifting event, and mismatched body and mechanical components typical of hobbyist repair of racing cars in which functionality, rather than aesthetics, are of primary concern.

== Criticism ==
Traditional hot rodders and restorers often regard the rat rod trend movement as "cheap" and "talentless". Sentiment among "critics" tends to be dismissive and sometimes overtly negative.

Hot rodder and freelance journalist Brad Ocock said of the rat rod trend:

There's a huge difference between rat rod and beater. A beater has potential. A rat rod is something someone threw together to make a statement, and usually that statement is, 'I don't know how to weld. I had a bunch of crap lying around and realized there was enough to put together a car but didn't want to put any effort into it.'

Hot rod journalist and builder Jim Aust put it in his own perspective:

I put the majority of it into two categories—"Young Guy Bad Style" and "Old Guy Bad Style". The two different camps are separated by those that do not know better and those that should- yet both produce a high volume of style violations. The young guys that generally do not know any better commit their sins in the name of "Why not, it gets a ton of attention at the cars shows". The problem is a clown on fire gets a lot of attention too, doesn't make it a good thing either especially if you are the clown. The young violators like to not only produce a car that in its raw form has no flow or style, but on top of that they "decorate" them with such unnecessary items as spikes, bullets, grenades, plastic rats, garden tools, barbed wire, skulls and oversized tools. The young guys into this style are nearly 100-percent new comers that have no knowledge of hot rod and custom car history and generally do not care. Good news many of them discover the history and quickly outgrow the offensive style and leave it behind as they build new vehicles with an eye on style rather than creating unappreciated attention.

People at Lateral-g share their perspective as:

These DIY-builds, known as rat rods, are an excellent example of the versatility in this industry and a great starting project for newcomers. Of course, some die-hard hot rod enthusiasts take offense at these almost Frankenstein-ed builds being at same auto events as more traditionally rebuilt hot rods and carefully restored muscle cars, but there is a beauty here.

However, despite such attitudes in many areas of hot rodding, over the last ten to twelve years rat rods have become more and more accepted at car shows and in the custom car culture in general, with many car shows either including sections for rat rods, or beginning events directly devoted to them and aimed at wider audiences than ever before.

== See also ==
- Rat bike
- Rat fink
- Pinstriping
- Volksrod
