= Lowrider Club =

A Lowrider Club (C.C.) is an organized car club of lowriders who follow a series of traditional rules for participation, including a group of elected officers; a probationary period for new members and the wearing of a specific club patch or shirt. Also, there is a measure of privacy about their internal structure, bylaws, and membership; and some level of sworn allegiance to other members of the club.

== History ==
The earliest car clubs were formed in the 1930s, though the reputedly oldest lowrider club is the Dukes. The Dukes first got together in 1962. The club went on for some four years, breaking up in 1969. The club started up again but between 1970 and 1977, the ghost of the club carried on. Socially the Dukes hire out to weddings and quinceaneras as chauffeurs. They also have club picnics and enter the better car shows.

== Gangs, outlaws and outside of stereotyping ==
Lowrider clubs are often perceived as criminal organizations or, at best, gangs of hoodlums or thugs. This perception has been fueled by movies, popular culture, and highly publicized isolated incidents. The organization of lowriders into clubs was done in part to eliminate the belief that they were criminal gangs.
