= Car tuning =

Modification of a car's performance

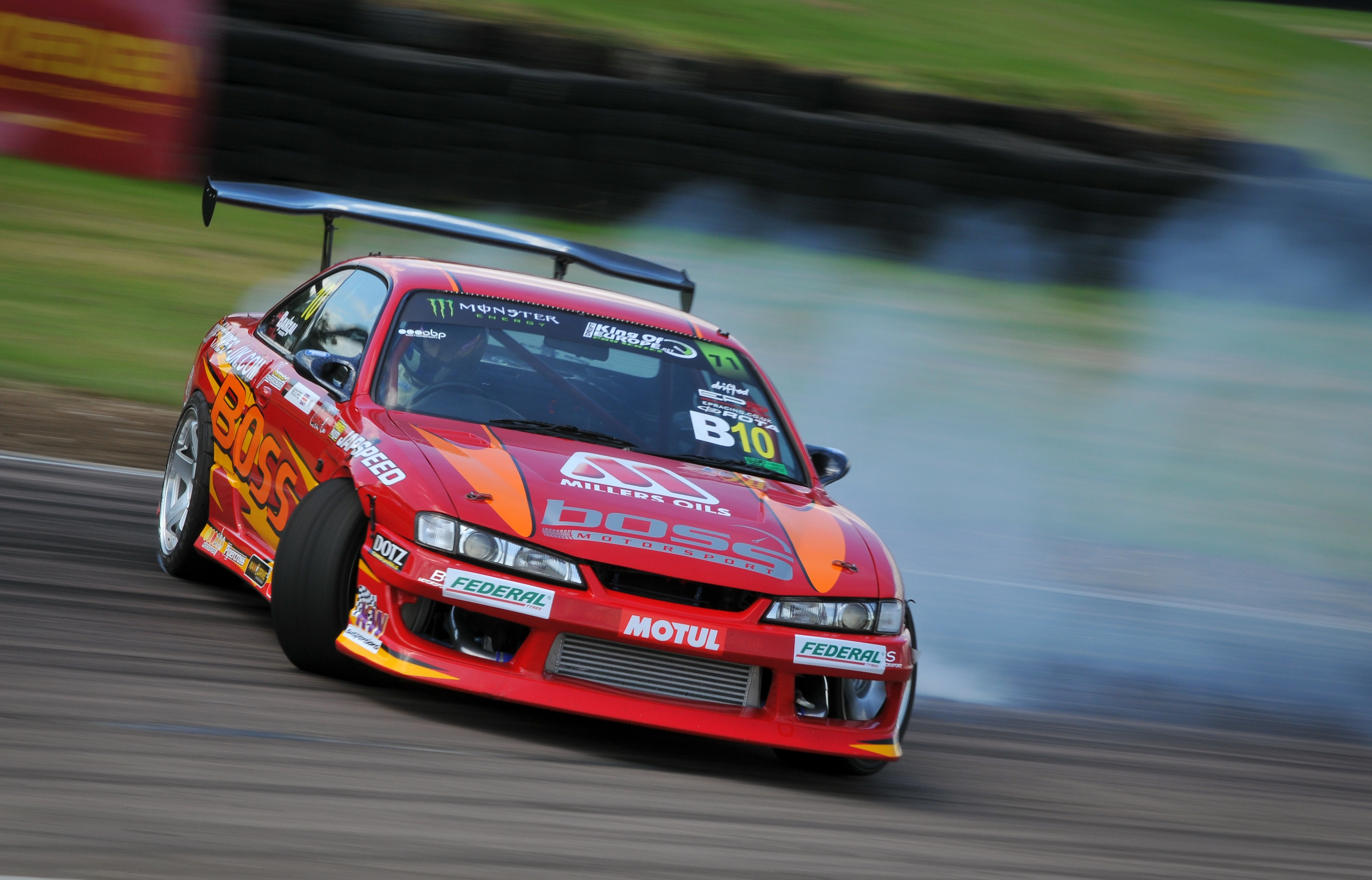
Nissan Silvia modified for drifting

Car tuning is the modification of a car to optimise it for a different set of performance requirements from those it was originally designed to meet. Most commonly this is higher engine performance and dynamic handling characteristics but cars may also be altered to provide better fuel economy, or smoother response. The goal when tuning is the improvement of a vehicle's overall performance in response to the user's needs. Often, tuning is done at the expense of emissions performance, component reliability and occupant comfort.

As a culture has grown around modified cars the term tuning has grown to encompass the cosmetic and stylistic changes owners make to personalize their vehicles. These changes can range from functional modifications designed to improve the performance or functionality of the car, to visual modifications which alter the aesthetics of the car and, in the case of certain mods, sometimes be detrimental to the performance or functionality of the car.

== Origin ==
Since their invention, cars have always been subject to modification. Most of the earliest cars were made individually by hand and not by a factory, and as such there was little meaningful distinction yet between factory, custom and aftermarket changes to a car. However, as mass production of cars began to rise, this distinction emerged. Some of the earliest examples of cars modified from their original specifications for improved performance were cars modified for racing or off-roading. In the early 1900s, some of the most popular cars to modify for racing were Ford Model Ts and Model As, often modified to race on dirt tracks and dry lake beds. Some of the earliest dedicated offroad vehicles were made using the Kégresse track system, starting in the late 1910s, which affixed tracks to an ordinary car in place of the rear wheels for improved off-road traction.

The term "tuning" has been in use throughout most of the 20th century to refer to the maintenance and modification of various mechanical systems on a car's engine, with "tune-ups" being a common service offered by mechanics. The terms "tuning" and "tuner car" began to rise in popularity in the United States in the 1980s and 1990s to refer to the rise of people modifying foreign cars, typically Japanese cars. This was contrasted against the previously predominant culture of car customization that grew primarily around customizing domestically produced American cars.

== Areas of modification ==
The essence of modification of a tuner car is an attempt at a significant performance increase—or the appearance of high performance—from a stock motor vehicle through the addition, alteration or outright replacement of parts. Although this largely involves modifying the engine and management systems of the vehicle to increase power output, additional changes are often required to allow the vehicle to handle such power, including stiffened suspension, widened tires, better brakes, and improved steering and transmission modifications. Although largely insignificant in terms of performance, certain modifications such as low-profile tires, altered suspension, and the addition of spoilers can change the overall appearance of the car, as well as adding downforce to increase traction.

=== Audio ===
A stock audio system is one specified by the manufacturer when the vehicle was built in the factory. A custom audio installation can involve anything from the upgrade of the radio to a full customization based around specific audio equipment. Events are held where entrants compete for the loudest, highest-quality audio reception or most innovative sound systems. Some common modifications include higher quality speakers and subwoofers, amplifiers, and better wiring.

=== Interior ===
Race cars competing in various classes must adhere to a strict set of regulations. As in some well-known racing events, like NASCAR and NHRA, sanctioned events often require a minimum vehicle weight. In such cases, the interior is stripped, and the required weight is achieved by adding ballast, allowing precise control over weight distribution. Along with weight requirements, safety requirements are present. Requirements differ for different classes. Roll cages, fire extinguishers, reinforced bucket seats, seat harnesses, and the like are some of the required safety modifications. Roll cages may be difficult to install when the stock interior is present.

Some tuners will have "gutted" interiors, or omit features that many ordinary drivers would find desirable or necessary, such as audio systems, air conditioning and soundproofing, in order to reduce vehicle weight.

=== Engine tuning ===
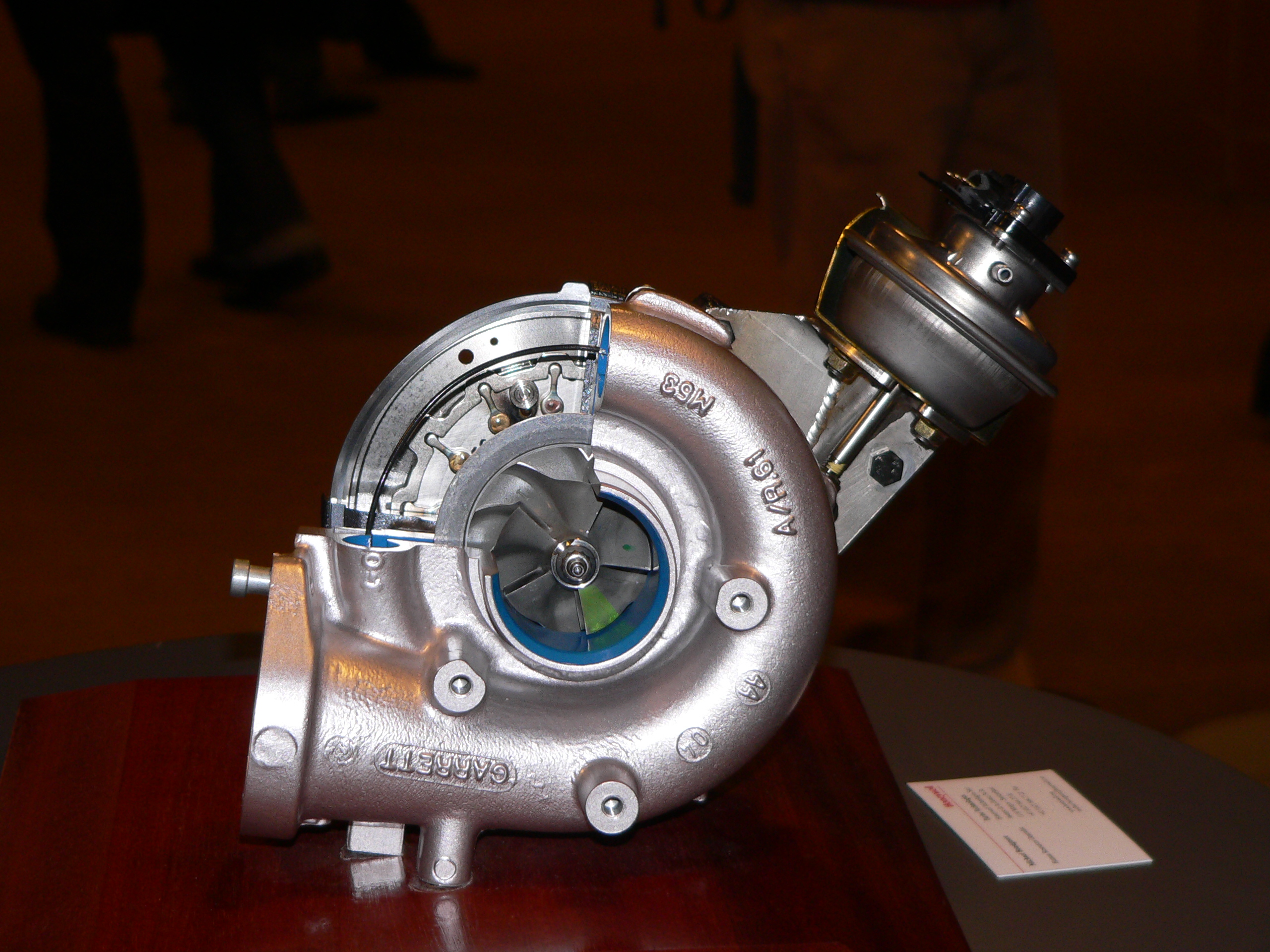
A cutaway of a turbocharger, used to increase the performance of an engine

Engine tuning is the process of modifying the operating characteristics of an engine. In a typical engine set-up, there are various mechanical and electronic elements such as the intake manifold, spark plugs, and mass air flow sensor. Modern engines employ the use of an engine control unit to provide the best balance between performance and emissions. Via the OBD communications protocol, electronically controlled aspects of the engine can be modified in a process known as mapping. Mapping can either be performed by changing the software within the ECU (chip tuning via firmware modification), or by providing false data via plug-in hardware. Other standalone engine management systems are available; these systems replace the factory computer with one that is user-programmable. Engine tuning often involves the use of a dynamometer in order to provide, base-line performance and post tuning metrics.

Mechanical components of the engine can also be added or replaced, such as forced induction systems like turbochargers or superchargers.

Improper, incorrect and poorly executed engine modifications can have a detrimental effect on performance and reliability. Mechanical and electrical components can suffer or simply fail as a result. An example would be the use of an air compressor such as a turbocharger to increase the volume of air used in the power stroke of the Otto cycle. In a typical chemical reaction, the air–fuel ratio must be a minimum of 14:1. If higher ratios are used, higher pressures and temperatures are observed in the cylinders, which can quickly push an engine beyond its intended design limits.

Neglecting such operating parameters can lead to premature failures, such as warped cylinder heads and walls, disintegrated piston rings, cracked or bent connecting rods and crankshafts, total cooling system failure, engine fire, engine knocking, engine seizing, and even blowouts. This can all lead to very expensive repairs, as well as being very dangerous.

=== Suspension tuning ===
Suspension tuning involves modifying the springs, shock absorbers, anti-roll bars, and other related components. Shorter springs offer greater stiffness and a lower center of gravity at the possible cost of unwanted changes of suspension geometry. Stiffer shock absorbers improve dynamic weight shifting during cornering and normally have shorter internals to stop them from bottoming out when shorter springs are used. Stiffer sway bars reduce body roll during cornering, thus improving the grip that the tires have on the surface by reducing suspension geometry changes caused by roll; this also improves handling response due to faster weight shifting—similar to stiffer springs.

The danger with overly stiff anti-roll bars is the lifting of the inner wheel, causing a loss of traction. By increasing the roll resistance of one end of the car, weight transfer is concentrated at that end, causing it to slip more than the other. This effect is used to control the over/understeer characteristic as well as to reduce roll. Other components that are sometimes added are strut bars, which improve body stiffness and help better maintain proper suspension geometry during cornering. On some cars, certain braces or anti-roll bars can be retrofitted to base model cars from sports models.

For offroad vehicles, the emphasis is on lengthening the suspension travel and installing larger tires. Larger tires—with or without larger wheels—increase ground clearance, travel over rough terrain more smoothly, provide additional cushioning, and decrease ground pressure (which is important on soft surfaces).

These suspension modifications are in contrast to lowriders, which use hydraulic or pneumatic suspensions. Lowriders use another type of suspension tuning in which the height of each individual wheel can be rapidly adjusted by a system of rams which, in some cases, makes it possible to "bounce" the wheels completely off of the ground.

=== Body tuning ===
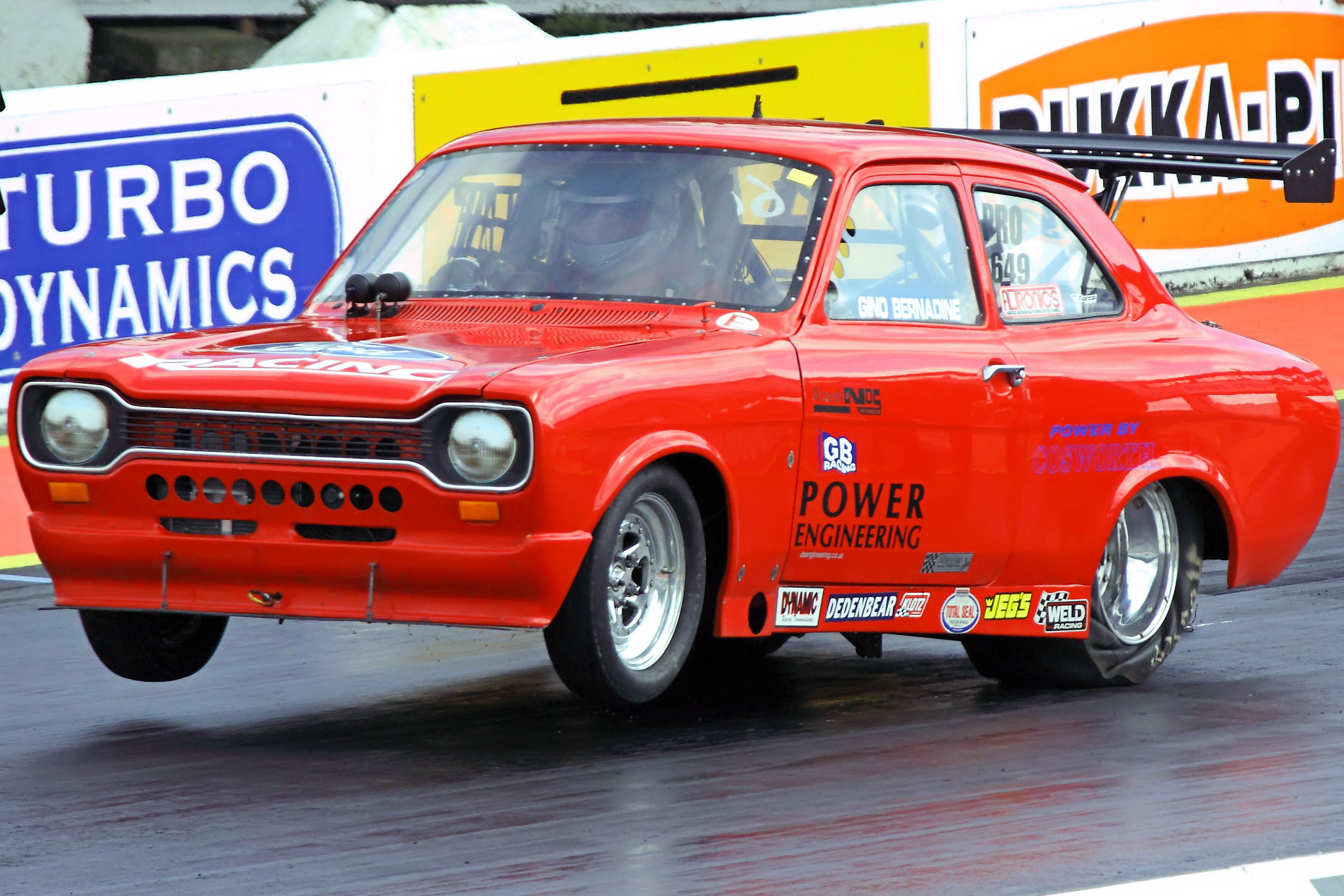
Ford Escort modified for drag racing

Body tuning involves making modifications to the body of the car in order to alter the aesthetics of the car, improve performance, or both. Body tuning can also involve changing or replacing parts for better aerodynamic performance. Through downforce, cornering speeds and tire adhesion can be improved, often at the expense of increased drag. To lighten the vehicle, bodywork components such as hoods and rearview mirrors may be replaced with lighter-weight components.

Often, body modifications are done mainly to improve a vehicle's appearance, as in the case of non-functioning scoops, wide arches or other aesthetic modifications. Aftermarket spoilers or body kits rarely improve a car's performance. The majority, in fact, add weight and increase the drag coefficient of the vehicle, thus reducing its overall performance.

Dating back to the 1940s, techniques such as chopping and channeling were a popular method of modifying a car's aerodynamics and styling.

Increasing the wheel track width through spacers and wide body kits, or lowering the center of gravity via suspension modifications, can enhance the car's cornering ability. Often, suspension tuners unfamiliar with spring dynamics will cut stock springs, producing a harder, bouncy ride. It is also common to stance a car, lowering it beyond its optimal ride height purely for appearance.

Competition cars may have lightweight windows, or the windows may be completely removed, as auto glass adds significant weight and detrimentally alters weight distribution. Plastic windows are much more vulnerable to scratches, which reduce service life.

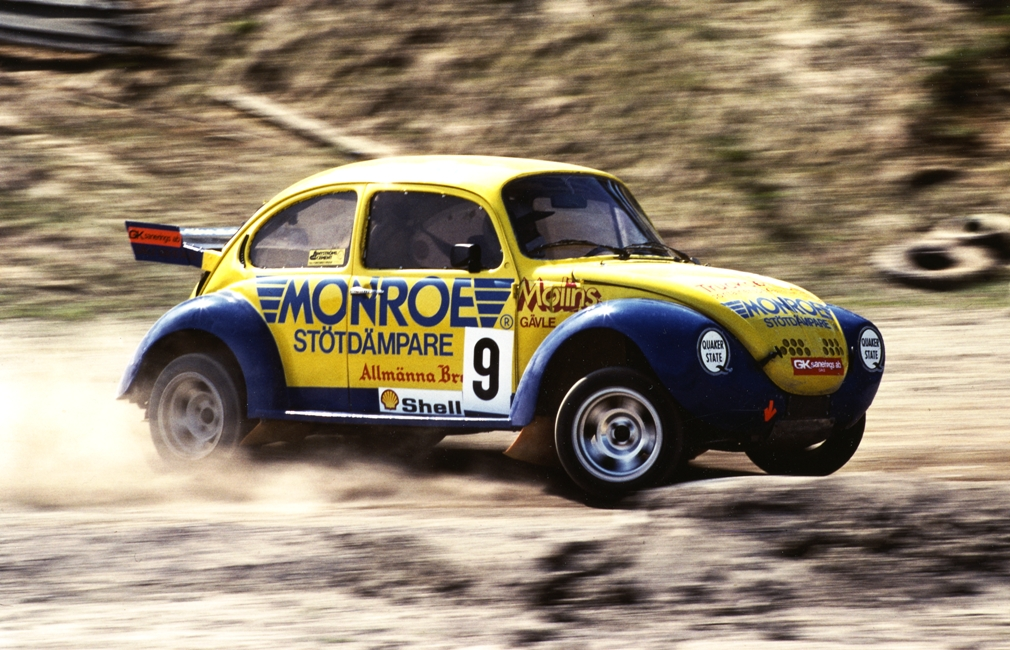
Volkswagen Beetle modified for rallycross

=== Tires ===
Tires have large effects on a car's behavior and are replaced periodically; therefore, tire selection is a cost-effective way to personalize an automobile. Choices include tires for various weather and road conditions, different sizes and various compromises between cost, grip, service life, rolling resistance, handling and ride comfort. Drivers also sometimes personalize tires for aesthetic reasons, for example, by adding tire lettering.

=== Detuning ===
Detuning is the process returning a modified car to its original factory status, or reducing its performance in a particular area of tuning. For example, a car may be "detuned" to allow increased traction when the track grip is not sufficient to handle the increased power of the tuned engine.

== Styles of modification ==
Modified cars can be significantly different from their stock counterparts, as a result a common factor among owners/modifiers is to emulate the visual and/or performance characteristics of established styles and design principles; though the similarities may not be intentional. As a result, there are now many different styles and visual influences to car modification, some of which are:

- Rat style: The characteristics of the rat rod style of hot rod and custom cars. Usually imitating the appearance of being "unfinished" known of some hot rods in the 40s, 50s and 60s.
- Hot rod style: The characteristics of early hot rods from the 1930s and 1940s. Largely consists of period specific vehicles, components and finishes. May also include the associated styles of Street rods and Custom cars.
- Modern styles: The recently established modification styles such as the Import scene, Lowriders, European (Euro-style), DUB, Cal Look; most of which are largely visually oriented.
- Cultural/media styles: The characteristics specific to cultures, stereotypes and media such Boy racers and film specific cars; however these characteristics are often largely based on other modification styles.
- Production car styles: The characteristics of production vehicles, such as current-model and luxury cars, Sports cars, Supercars and Muscle cars; largely with the intent of improving or updating a vehicles appearance and/or technology to current market preferences.
- Purpose built/racing car styles: The characteristics of racing cars or other purpose built vehicles such as those of touring car racing, Rallying, Drifting (motorsport) and Drag racing.

== Legal requirements ==
Many countries or municipalities have legal requirements which govern vehicle modifications. For example, all vehicles in Victoria, Australia, must conform to construction standards to ensure vehicle safety. There are also restrictions for P Plate drivers which can prevent young drivers from driving modified vehicles.

Many developed countries have smog regulations, which generally forbid any modifications to engines or related components unless the modifications themselves are certified, like production car models. Such modifications, even if they do not actually result in increased emissions, prevent legal use on public roads.

== Sanctioning organizations ==
Various organizations involved in competitive motorsports such as the FIA, SFI, NHRA, and IHRA, amongst others, act as sanctioning bodies to establish safety guidelines for racing events, series, tracks, vehicles, and parts. The FIA is the largest international motorsports governing body, with FIA certification being required for a number of parts, particularly safety equipment, in FIA sanctioned events, as well as in many non FIA events.

== See also ==
- Automotive aftermarket
- Automotive restoration
- Auto racing
- Custom car
- Virtual tuning
- SEMA
- List of Auto tuning companies
