= The Computer Edition of Scrabble =

- Developers: Peter Turcan; Psion; Leisure Genius
- Publishers: Little Genius, Sinclair Research, Leisure Genius, Virgin Games
- Platforms: Amiga, Amstrad CPC, Amstrad PCW, Atari ST, BBC Micro, Apple II, Commodore 64, MS-DOS, Mac, MSX, Sinclair QL, Einstein, Thomson MO5/MO6, Thomson TO7/TO8/TO9, ZX Spectrum
- Release: EU: 9 September 1982; (Apple II)
- Genre: Strategy
- Mode: Single-player

The Computer Edition of Scrabble, also known as Computer Scrabble, is a computer version of the board game Scrabble, licensed from J. W. Spear & Sons and released by Little Genius for the Apple II in 1982. It was subsequently released for most home computers of the time.

== Gameplay ==
The Computer Edition of Scrabble is a game which features on-screen versions of the game board, tiles, and game pieces. The game uses a clock for which the user can define the time limit for turns, in which the player must place a word before the time runs out. The game also has options for lightning-timing and tournament-timing to be used instead. The player can view the rack of available letters at the bottom of the screen and type a word composed of these letters, and if the game accepts the word then the player uses the cursor on the game board to position the word on-screen and score the move. The player may also pass a turn, request a hint for one playable word, and see the values of the tiles at any time by using a pull-down menu.

== Development ==
Computer Scrabble was initially developed by Peter Turcan at the University of Reading on an ICL mainframe as part of his PhD research into word structures and then ported to the 48K disc-based Apple II via an Intertec Superbrain.

Little Genius licensed the game to Psion who developed a version for the 48K ZX Spectrum which was marketed by Sinclair Research in 1983. Unlike the Apple version which accessed a 9,100 word dictionary from disc, Psion used a Huffman compression algorithm to store a 12,000 word dictionary within the tape-based ZX Spectrum's 48K memory.

In 1984, Little Genius formed an associate company, Leisure Genius, which developed and published versions for the Commodore 64 and BBC Micro. Leisure Genius was bought by Virgin Games in 1986 and continued to sell the original versions while also releasing ports for newer machines.

== Reception ==
In 1988, Dragon gave the Macintosh version of the game 3 out of 5 stars. Macworld reviewed the Macintosh version of Computer Scrabble, praising its faithfulness to the original board game, and challenging AI opponent. They also praise Scrabble's graphics, stating that the "game board is well designed, with premium-word and -letter squares that are easy to distinguish." Macworld criticizes its incompatibility with older keyboards, stating that "pressing any key on the bottom row produces the letter to its left", and a glitch where the game refuses any valid words entered, requiring the game to be rebooted.

M. Evan Brooks reviewed the computer editions of Risk, Monopoly, Scrabble, and Clue for Computer Gaming World, and stated that "In this reviewer's opinion, Scrabble is the weakest product (given cumbersome play and graphics), while Risk and Clue: Master Detective are the strongest."
