= Final Assault =

1987 video game

- Developer: Infogrames
- Publisher: Infogrames
- Designers: Alain Vialon; Emile Nguyen; Van Huong; Harold Ovsec
- Artist: Didier Chanfray
- Composer: Charles Callet
- Platforms: Amiga, Amstrad CPC, Apple IIGS, Atari ST, Commodore 64, MS-DOS, Thomson MO6, Thomson TO8, ZX Spectrum
- Release: NA: 1987
- Genres: Simulation, sports
- Mode: Single-player

Final Assault, known as Chamonix Challenge in Europe, originally Bivouac in French, is a mountaineering simulation developed by Infogrames in 1987 and distributed by Infogrames in Europe and Epyx in the American continent, for the Amiga, Amstrad CPC, Apple IIGS, Atari ST, Commodore 64, MS-DOS, Thomson MO6, Thomson TO8 and ZX Spectrum. The original release of the game was copy protected.

== Gameplay ==
Gameplay in Final Assault takes place in the Alps. The player selects which trail to take, then packs climbing gear in a rucksack and chooses the departure time and season. On the trail, the player will need to overcome crevasses, ice cliffs, and rock faces – as well as complications such as hunger, exhaustion, thirst, and the cold – through caution, dexterity, and packing and making effective use of supplies. The game allows players to save their progress by packing a Save Game Disk in their rucksack.

== Reception ==
The MS-DOS version of the game was given 4 out of 5 stars by Dragon, who called it "innovating", "exciting", and "intriguing". The PC version of the game was given a 68% by The Games Machine, who criticized it for being tedious, but felt that "there is a great deal of satisfaction to be gained from conquering a peak". Likewise, the Atari ST and Amstrad CPC versions were given a 75% and 72% by the same magazine, respectively. Happy Magazine gave the Commodore 64 version a Happy Rating of 65, praising the amount of strategy present in the gameplay, but criticizing the limited use of music and sound effects. A more modern review from Jeuxvideo.com of the Amiga and Atari ST versions gave the game a 17/20, calling it extremely difficult and "particularly addictive".
