= Silent Service =

Silent Service may refer to:

- Royal Navy Submarine Service or Silent Service, the submarine element of the Royal Navy
- Silent Service (video game), a 1985 video game
- The Silent Service, a 1988 Japanese manga and anime series
- The Silent Service (book), a 1944 nonfiction book by Ion Idriess
- The Silent Service, a series of books by H. Jay Riker
- The Silent Service (TV Series) An American anthology series about US Submarines 1957–1958
