= Silent Service (video game) =

1985 video game

- Cover art by David Phillips
- Developers: MicroProse; Rare (NES); France Image Logiciel (Thomson)
- Publishers: MicroProse; Ultra Games (NES); France Image Logiciel (Thomson)
- Designer: Sid Meier
- Artist: Michael O. Haire
- Platforms: Amiga, Amstrad CPC, Apple II, Apple IIGS, Atari 8-bit, Atari ST, Commodore 64, IBM PC, NES, Thomson MO6, Thomson TO8, Thomson TO9, ZX Spectrum
- Release: 1985-1987
- Genre: Submarine simulator
- Mode: Single-player

Silent Service is a submarine simulator video game designed by Sid Meier and published in 1985 by MicroProse for the Apple II, Atari 8-bit computers, Commodore 64, and IBM PC compatibles, then ported to other home computers. A Nintendo Entertainment System version developed by Rare was published in 1989 by Konami in Europe and by Konami's Ultra Games subsidiary in North America. Silent Service II was released in 1990. Tommo purchased the rights to this game and published it online through its Retroism brand in 2015.

== Gameplay ==
Atari 8-bit gameplay

Silent Service is set in the Pacific Ocean during World War II, with the player assuming control of a U.S. submarine for various war patrols against Japanese shipping. "Silent Service" was a nickname for the US Navy's submarine force in the Pacific during World War II. The player can choose when to attack from a range of realistic tactics, including the End Around and near invisibility at night (if the sub's profile is kept to a minimum). It allows four projectiles concurrently, a challenge when battling multiple destroyers. Real-time is accelerated when not in combat.

Sid Meier described several key factors that influenced the design of the game: The size of the theater, the variety of tactical situations, and evolving technology, such as the use of surface radar and torpedoes that did or did not leave trails of bubbles on the surface—only simulations set after their real-life introduction had access to these. Tasks such as navigation, damage repair, and firing were compartmentalized into different screens to allow players access to a great deal of information, but also to focus on the immediate task.

The game features three types of missions: Torpedo/Gun Practice, Convoys Actions, and War Patrols. Torpedo/Gun Practice allows players to practice the game mechanics in a controlled environment. Convoy Actions are shorter missions based on individual historical attacks made by submarines. War Patrols are longer missions based around historical war patrols, but with more freedom given to the player to plot their own route.

== Development ==
The game was designed by Sid Meier, with art made by Michael O. Haire. Silent Service was in development for eight months and its creation was inspired by a fractal technological trick. It was the first game for which Meier did not create the artwork; MicroProse cofounder Bill Stealey hired an illustrator whose work persuaded Meier that others' talent was superior.

== Reception ==
Reception

Award
Publication	Award
Sinclair User	SU Classic

Silent Service was MicroProse's second best-selling Commodore game as of late 1987. The company sold 250,000 copies by March 1987, and roughly 400,000 overall.

Info in 1985 rated Silent Service for the Commodore 64 four stars out of five, stating that its quality and graphics "are all unmistakably MicroProse" and "ensure a satisfying level of play for any wargamer". Antic wrote in 1986 that "Sid Meier and his team of simulation experts at MicroProse have outdone themselves". The magazine approved of how the game offered both beginner modes and "complex, historically accurate, and challenging war patrol scenarios" for experts, and noted the Atari 8-bit version's "superb" graphics and "well done" manual". Antic in 1987 also liked the Atari ST version's graphics, sound, adjustable difficulty levels, and documentation, concluding: "It's a traditional MicroProse product and it's nice to see that they've remained dedicated to detail". Compute! wrote in 1986 that "like F-15 Strike Eagle, Silent Service is both intriguing and addictive... a superior product".

Computer Gaming World in 1986 called Silent Service "easily the best [submarine simulator] for its simplicity of use and execution". It praised the game's realism and only criticized the lack of a save game feature. Gregg Williams reviewed the Atari 8-bit home computer version, complimenting the graphics and sound and saying that they support the illusion of realism. A 1987 overview of World War II simulations rated the game five out of five stars, praising its "superb graphics coupled with detailed rules, historical accuracy and layers of complexity". In 1993 a survey of wargames gave the game two stars out of five, stating that "it has been rendered obsolete by time and superseded by Silent Service II". In 1996 the magazine ranked it as the 86th best game of all time, for having "introduced the control-room interface for submarine games on variety of platforms".

Silent Service was awarded the Charles S. Roberts Award for "Best Adventure Game for Home Computer of 1985".

== Sequel ==
A sequel to the game was published by MicroProse in 1990 for MS-DOS and other versions in following years.
