= List of Thomson computers =

1980s French personal computer range

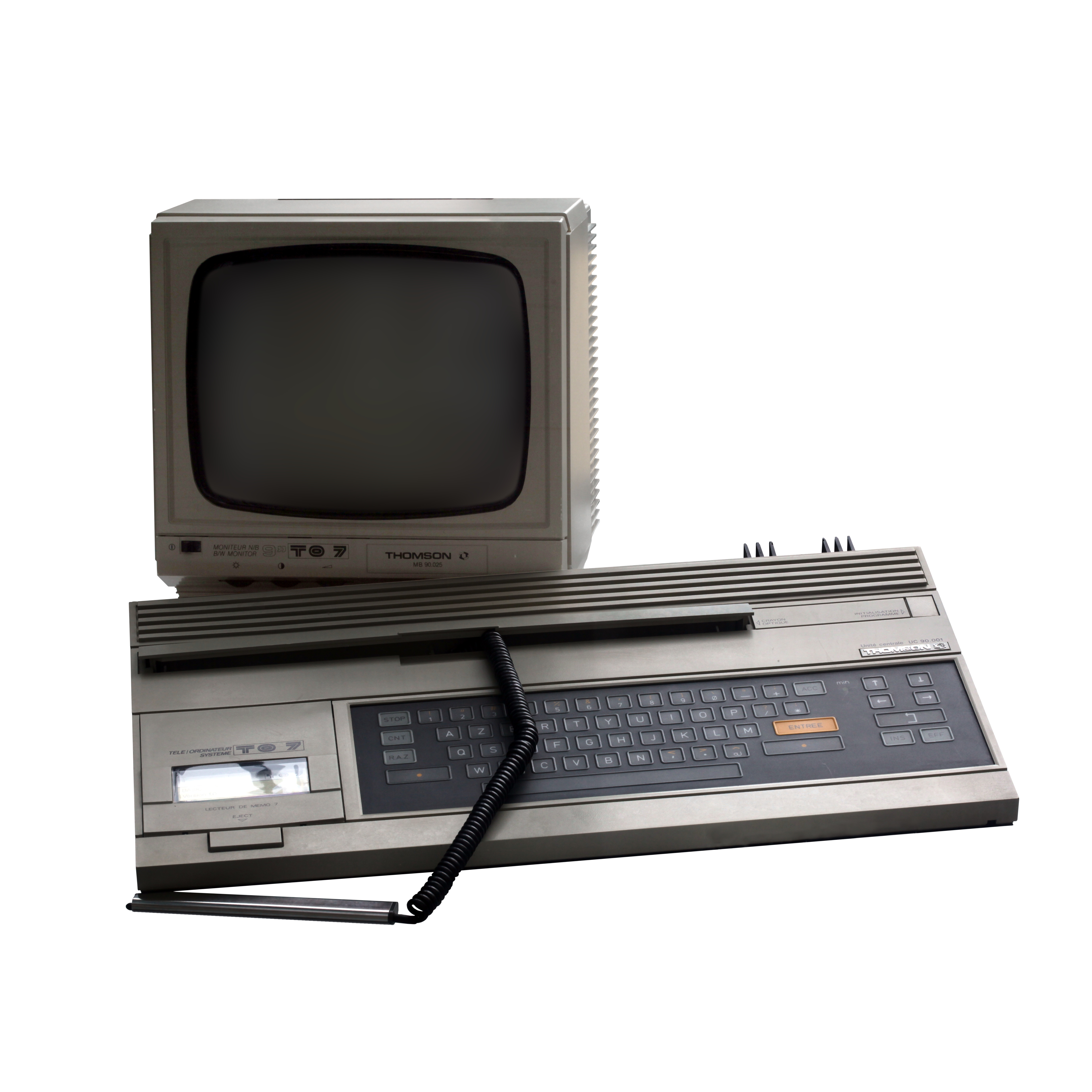
Thomson TO7 computer on display at the Musée Bolo, Lausanne

In the 1980s the French Thomson company produced a range of 8-bit computers based on the 6809E CPU.

They were released in several variations (mostly concerning the keyboard or color of the casing) covering the MO and TO series from late 1982 to 1989. While MO and TO models are incompatible in software, most of the peripherals and hardware were compatible.

These machines were common in France due to the 1980s governmental educational program Computing for All (Informatique pour Tous). Around 100,000 MO5 and TO7/70 computers were ordered and installed in schools.

Export attempts to Germany, Italy, Algeria, USSR, India, Argentina and Spain were unsuccessful.

It is reported that there were 450,000 Thomson computers in France in 1986. By 1988 Thomson had only sold 60,000 of the predicted 150,000 computers, abandoning computer development the following year.

About 84 games were released for the TO7, 194 for the MO5, 3 for the TO7/70, 10 for the TO9, 21 for the MO6, and 128 for the TO8. Most titles were released between 1984 and 1987 and by French companies such as Infogrames, Loriciel, FIL or Coktel Vision.

== First generation ==
- Thomson TO7: produced from 1982 to 1984. Supplied with 24K RAM (16K used by the video) and upgradable to 48K. 8 color display.
- Thomson MO5: released in 1984 in order to honor the Computing for All (Informatique pour Tous) plan. Supplied with 48K RAM (32K available to user in BASIC 1.0) and first released with a rubber keyboard. Later it featured a mechanical keyboard. It was edited in a limited edition with a white casing, named "MO5 Michel Platini".
- Thomson TO7/70: 1984 version with more RAM (64K, upgradable into 128K) and 16 color display.
- Thomson MO5E: 1985 export version, with a different casing featuring a mechanical keyboard, a parallel port, two joystick ports, an internal PAL modulator and an integrated power supply.
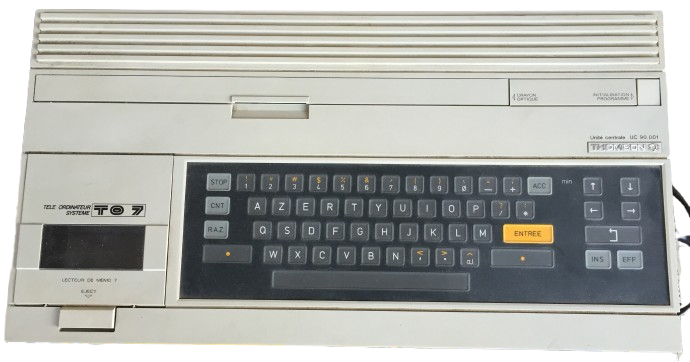
Thomson TO7

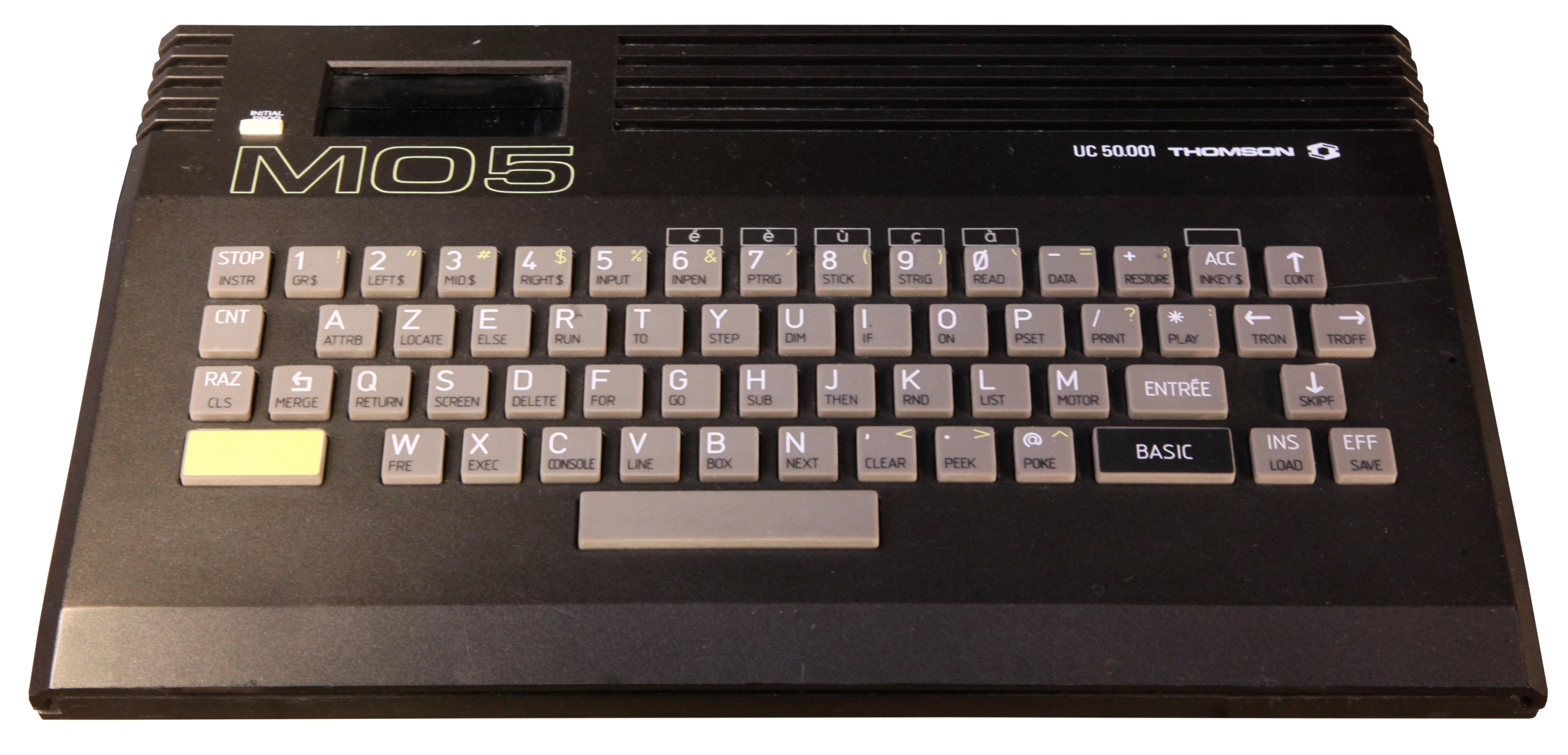
Thomson MO5

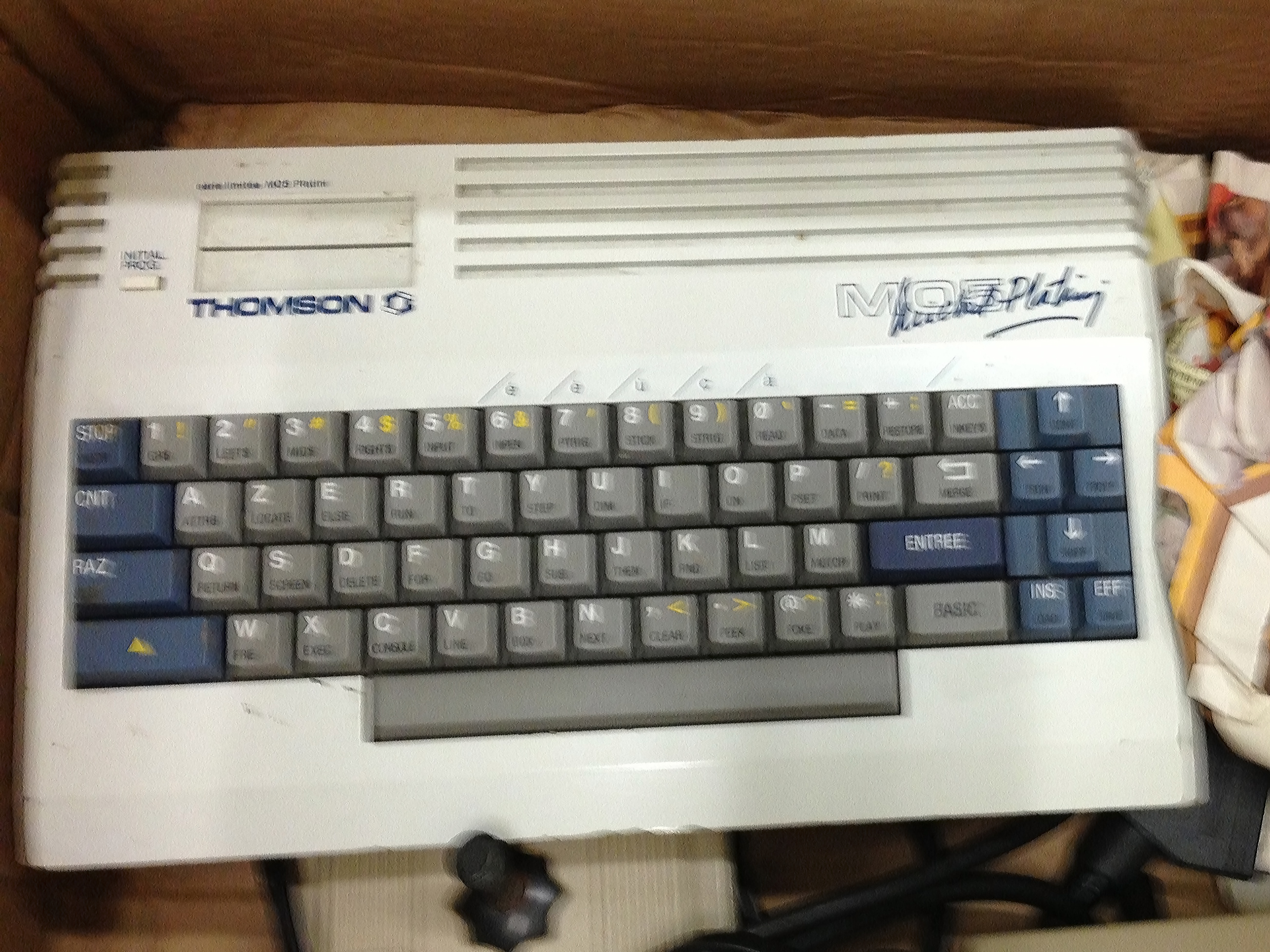
Thomson MO5 "Michel Platini" edition

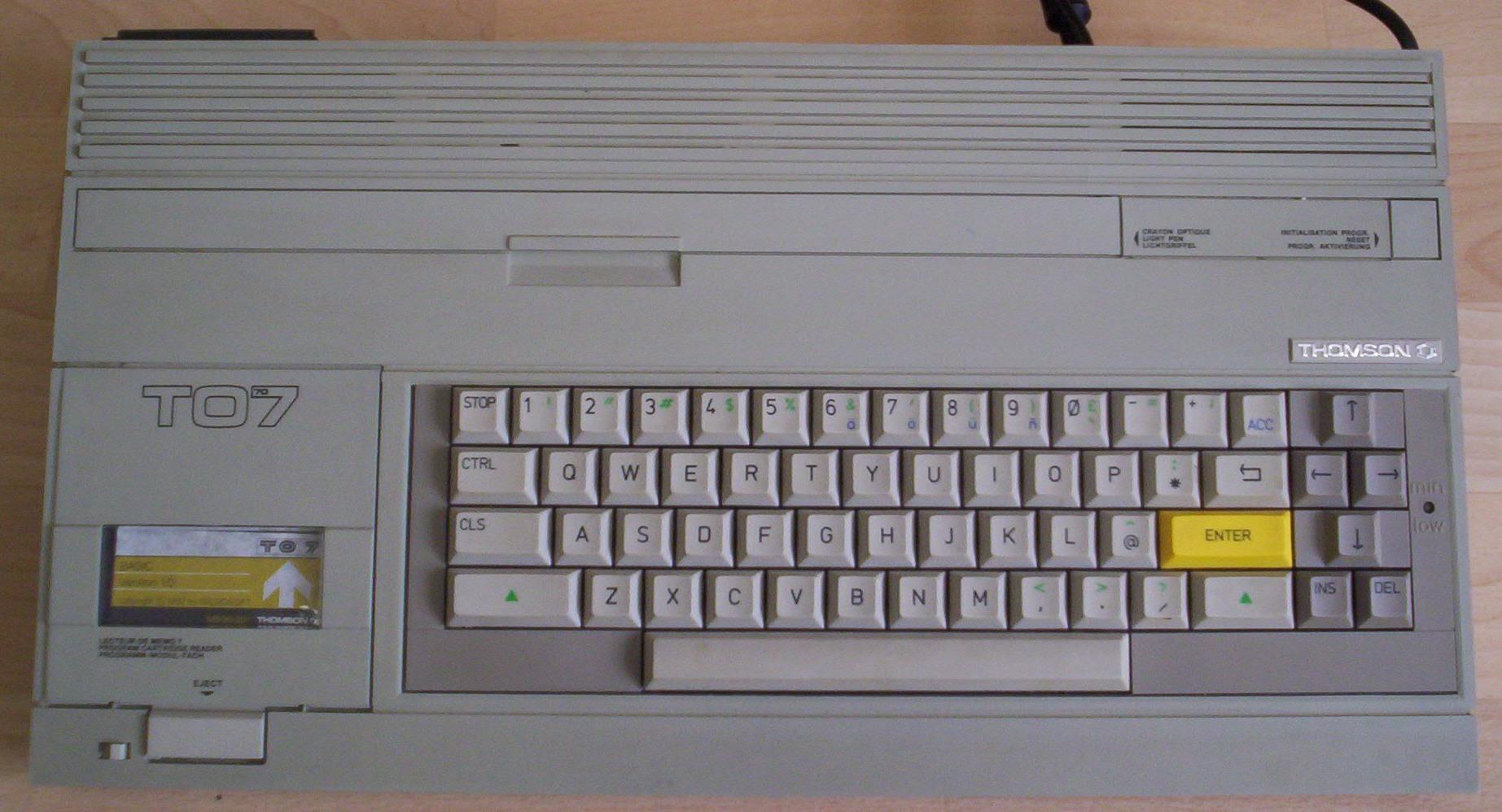
Thomson TO7-70

== Second generation ==
- Thomson TO9 : released in late 1985. Separate keyboard and central unit, 128K RAM and a 3½-inch floppy disk drive.
- Thomson MO5NR: released in 1985–1986. This is a MO6 in a MO5E casing, with an integrated network interface controller, the nanoréseau (nano network), which was used in French schools.
- Thomson TO16 (prototype) called Theodore (TO d'or): 5 prototypes developed in 1985–1988. Based on a MC-68000 at 8 MHz and a rather good graphic card.
- Thomson MO6 : released in 1986. 128K RAM and built in tape recorder. Sold in Italy as the Olivetti Prodest PC128.
- Thomson TO8 : released in late 1986. 256K RAM, 80K ROM with Microsoft BASIC 512, extra video modes.
- Thomson TO9+ : released in late 1986, Separate keyboard and central unit, 512K RAM with a built in modem and a 3½-inch floppy disk drive.
- Thomson TO8D : released in late 1987, it was a TO8 with a 3½-inch floppy disk drive.
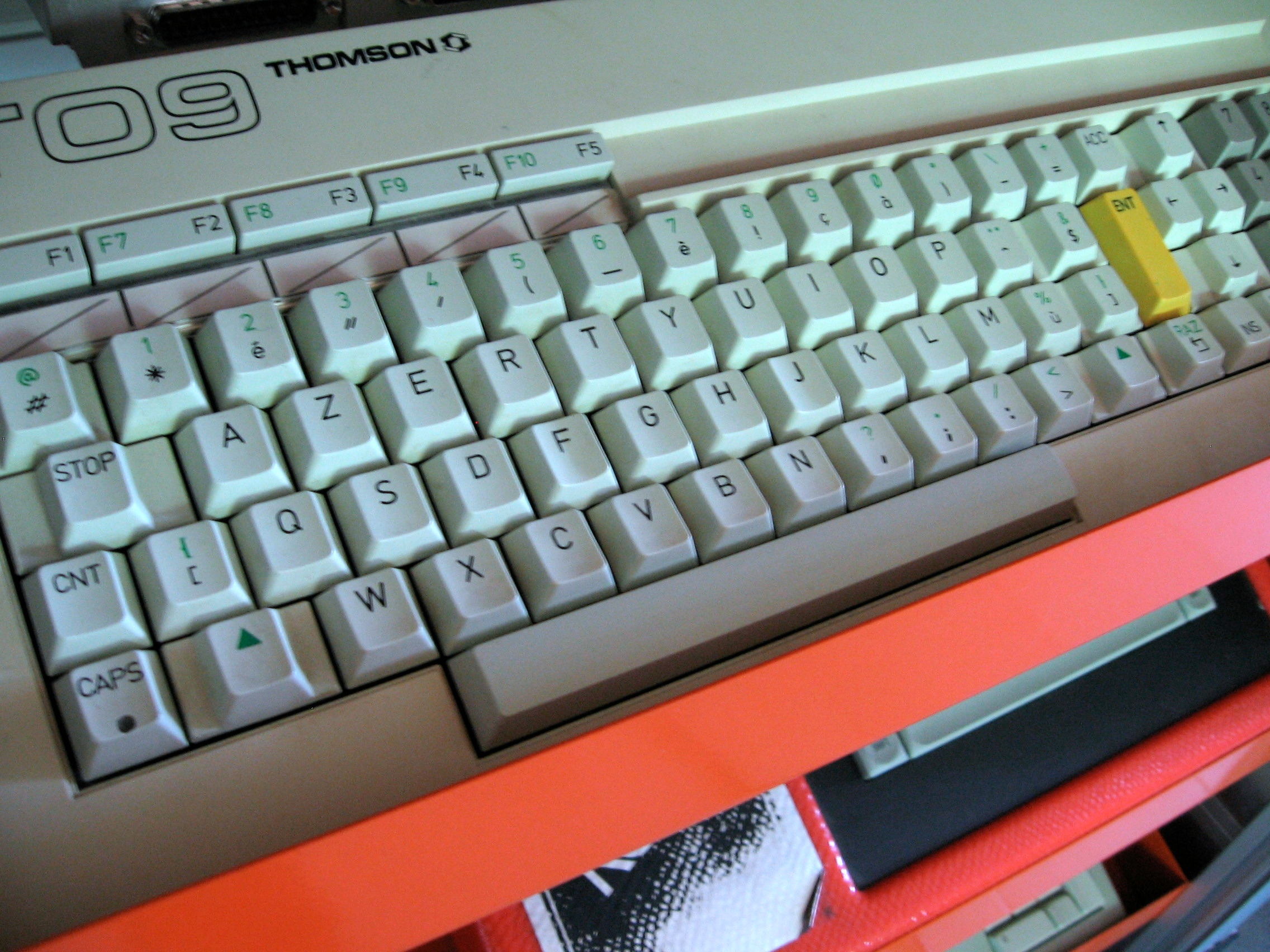
Thomson TO9

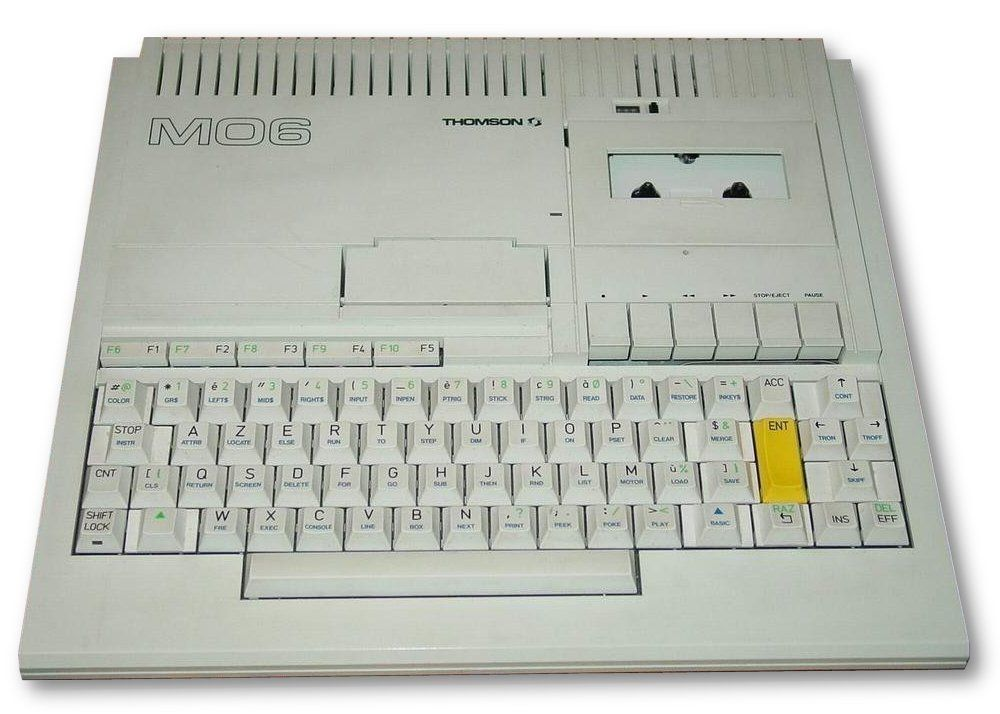
Thomson MO6

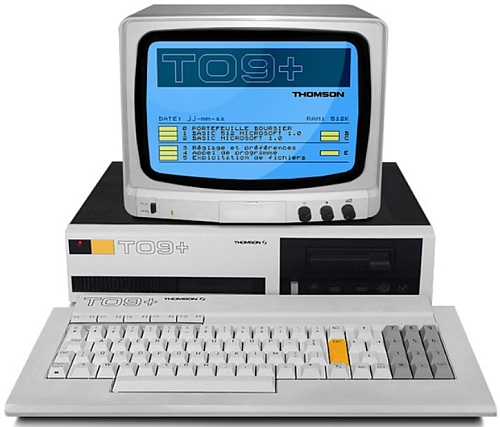
Thomson TO9+

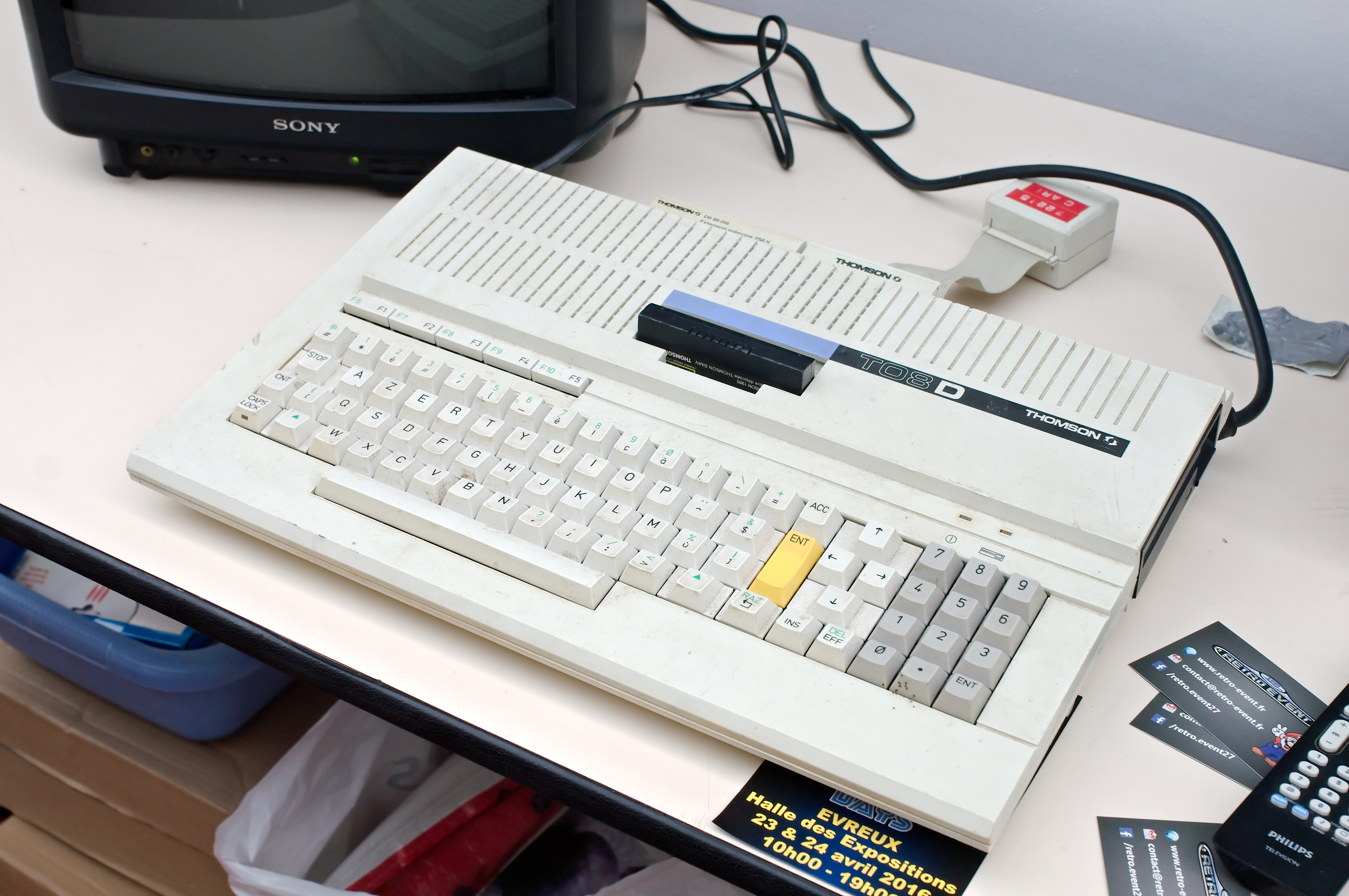
Thomson TO8D

== Unix systems ==
The Micromega was fundamental on the adoption of Unix by the French government, due to the localization of the Unix operating system. According to Dominique Maisonneuve, a Unix developer at CERG (Paris): "It was thanks to the Micromega that the government became interested in installing Unix. What was needed, was some hardware with a French coloring."

- Micromega 32: released in 1982, it was a Motorola 68000-based machine running Version 7 Unix, based on the Fortune 32:16, developed by Fortune Systems Corporation. It had a 68000 CPU clocked at 5.5 MHz and 256KB of RAM, expandable to 1MB. The display was monochrome and text based. An optional card enabled pixel graphics with a resolution of 800x480. Another expansion card added a Zilog Z80 CPU enabling the machine to run CP/M. External floppy drives or hard disks (with sizes up to 20MB) could be connected. The RS232 port could be used for network connection. The machine was presented to the public at the 1982 Salon des industries et du commerce de bureau (SICOB) in the Paris Expo Porte de Versailles. Aimed at business and government departments, it was used in French hospitals, embassies and scientific research. It was also sold in the Middle East and Algeria.
- Micromega 32000: A 1986 Alcatel branded machine with a tower layout, supporting Unix SV. The CPU is a 68020 at 16.5 MHz (68881 optional) with 1 to 4 MB of RAM. It features a 70MB hard drive, supports QIC-24 cartridges and offers Arcnet network connection.
- Micromega PC: a 1986 workstation supporting Unix and MS-DOS, and developed based on the PC 7000 XP.
- Micromega SX and Micromega SX/T - These machines have a similar box but with a different floppy drive location. The CPU is a 68000 at 11 MHz and RAM is expandable to 2 MB. It supports 45 and 70 MB hard drives and QIC-11 cartridges on the SX/T.

== PC compatible ==
- Micromega 16: released in 1983, it was an IBM PC compatible machine, similar to the Eagle PC developed in 1982 by Columbia Data Products.
- Thomson TO16 : released in September 1987. Intel 8088 based IBM compatible PC.

== Video Games ==
There are 465 commercially released games for the MO5, MO6, TO7, TO8 and PC-128.

Title	Publisher	Release year	MO5	MO6/PC128	TO7/TO8
1789	Infogrames	1986	YES	YES	YES
1815	Cobra Soft	1985	NO	NO	YES
1000 Bornes	Free Game Blot	1985	YES	YES	YES
20000 Avant J.C.	Chip	1987	NO	NO	YES
3D Fight	Loriciels	1986	YES	NO	YES
3D Sub	Loriciels	1985	YES	YES	NO
Addisous	CNDP Centre National de Documentation Pedagogique	1986	NO	NO	YES
Air Attack	Loriciels	1985	YES	YES	YES
Airbus	Nathan	1984	YES	YES	YES
Alienator	Ubi Soft	1989	NO	NO	YES
Alphaclown construit sa maison	Novasoft	1985	YES	YES	NO
America's Cup	Free Game Blot	1986	YES	YES	YES
Androides	Infogrames	1985	YES	YES	YES
Aquanaute	FIL	1987	NO	YES	YES
Arkanoid	FIL	1987	YES	YES	YES
Armada	Langage et Informatique	1984	NO	NO	YES
Arsene Lapin	Infogrames	1984	YES	NO	YES
Asterix chez Rahazade	Coktel Vision	1987	NO	NO	YES
Asterix et la Potion Magique	FIL	1987	YES	YES	YES
Astro-Couple	Answare	1985	NO	NO	YES
Astromus	Logimus	1984	YES	YES	NO
Atomik	FIL	1987	YES	YES	YES
Atomium	Nathan	1982	NO	NO	YES
Au Nom de l'Hermine	Coktel Vision	1987	NO	NO	YES
Avenger	FIL	1986	YES	YES	YES
Backgammon	Nathan	1984	YES	YES	YES
Bactron	Loriciels	1986	NO	YES	YES
Balade en Ballon	Sprites	1985	YES	YES	YES
Ball Trap	Sprites	1985	NO	NO	YES
Balthazar	Titus Software	1987	YES	YES	NO
Barry McGuigan Championship Boxing	Microïds	1986	NO	NO	YES
Beach-Head	FIL	1985	YES	YES	YES
Bidul	Infogrames	1984	YES	YES	YES
Bivouac (Chamonix Challenge)	Infogrames	1987	NO	YES	YES
Blitz!	TOTEK	1985	YES	YES	YES
Blocs-Logiques	CNDP Centre National de Documentation Pedagogique	1986	NO	NO	YES
Blue Star	Free Game Blot	1987	NO	YES	YES
Blue War	Free Game Blot	1986	YES	YES	YES
Blue War II	Free Game Blot	1986	YES	YES	YES
Blueberry	Coktel Vision	1987	NO	NO	YES
Bob Morane Chevalerie 1	Infogrames	1987	NO	YES	YES
Bob Morane Jungle 1	Infogrames	1987	NO	YES	YES
Bob Morane Science Fiction 1	Infogrames	1987	NO	YES	YES
Bob Winner	Loriciels	1987	NO	NO	YES
Bobo	Infogrames	1988	NO	YES	YES
Bolchoï	Coktel Vision	1985	NO	NO	YES
Bomber	Hebdogiciel	1985	YES	YES	NO
Brain Power	Softbook	1987	YES	YES	YES
Breaker	Free Game Blot	1987	YES	YES	YES
Brigade du Feu	Coktel Vision	1985	NO	NO	YES
Briques Logiques	Ediciel Matra & Hachette	1985	NO	NO	YES
Buds	TOTEK	1984	YES	YES	NO
Bugs Buster	Free Game Blot	198?	NO	NO	YES
Bumper World	Ubi Soft	1989	NO	NO	YES
Business+	FIL	1986	YES	YES	NO
Cap Horn	Coktel Vision	198?	YES	YES	NO
Cap sur Dakar	Coktel Vision	1985	YES	YES	YES
Captain Blood	ERE	1988	NO	YES	YES
Caractor	TOTEK	1983	NO	NO	YES
Caractor II	TOTEK	1984	NO	NO	YES
Cartable Francais	Infogrames	1984	NO	NO	YES
Cartoon Maker	Free Game Blot	1985	YES	YES	NO
Categoric	No Man's Land	1984	YES	YES	NO
Challenge - Simulation d'Entreprise	Coktel Vision	1988	NO	NO	YES
Challenge Voile	Loriciels	1984	YES	YES	YES
Chasseur Omega	Infogrames	1983	YES	YES	NO
Chateau Noir et Dragons Rouges	Nathan	1985	YES	YES	YES
Chicago 90	Microids	1989	NO	YES	YES
Choplifter	FIL	1985	NO	NO	YES
Classiques Vol. 1	Titus Software	1987	YES	YES	YES
Classiques Vol. 2	Titus Software	1987	YES	YES	YES
Classiques Vol. 3	Titus Software	1987	YES	YES	YES
Classiques Vol. 4	Titus Software	1987	YES	YES	YES
Club Thoms+ 1	Micromedia Systemes	1989	NO	NO	YES
Club Thoms+ 2	Micromedia Systemes	199?	NO	NO	YES
Club Thoms+ 3	Micromedia Systemes	199?	NO	NO	YES
Club Thoms+ 4	Micromedia Systemes	199?	NO	NO	YES
Cobra	Loriciels	1987	NO	NO	YES
Coffret Cadeau	FIL	1986	NO	NO	YES
Coliseum	Loriciels	1985	YES	YES	YES
Coloric	Free Game Blot	1984	YES	YES	YES
Communication	FIL	1987	NO	NO	YES
Comptabilite Generale	FIL	1986	NO	NO	YES
Connexion	Mipso	1983	NO	NO	YES
Construire L'Europe	EDIL Edition Informatique Logiciel	1985	NO	NO	YES
Conte	FIL	1985	NO	NO	YES
Contrôle Aérien	Nathan	1984	YES	YES	YES
Coq Inn	Nathan	1984	YES	YES	NO
Crack le Noir	Coktel Vision	1987	NO	NO	YES
Crazy Cars	Titus	1987	NO	NO	YES
Creexo	CNDP Centre National de Documentation Pedagogique	1986	NO	NO	YES
Crocky 2	Loriciels	1984	YES	YES	NO
Crucial Test	Tomahawk	198?	NO	NO	YES
Crypto	Nathan	1982	NO	NO	YES
Crystann, Le Donjon de Diamant	Novasoft / Loriciels	1985	YES	YES	YES
Cyberlab	TOTEK	1984	YES	YES	YES
Cyrus Echecs	Intelligent Soft.	1984	NO	NO	YES
Dakar 4x4	Coktel Vision	198?	YES	YES	NO
Dakar Moto	Coktel Vision	198?	YES	YES	YES
Dames	Loriciels	1984	YES	YES	NO
Defi au Tarot	Coktel Vision	1988	NO	NO	YES
Demineur	ASCI	1992	NO	YES	NO
Démonia	Microids	1987	YES	YES	YES
Des Chiffres et des Lettres (Les Chiffres et les Lettres)	Nathan	1985	YES	YES	YES
Des Signes dans l'Espace	Nathan	1983	NO	NO	YES
Dianne, Mission Rubidiums	Loriciels	198?	YES	YES	NO
Dom Camillo	Free Game Blot	1987	NO	YES	YES
Dossier Boerhaave (Intrigo a Parigi)	Infogrames	1986	YES	YES	YES
Dossier Greenpeace	Cobra Soft	198?	NO	NO	YES
Draughts (Jeu de Dames Américain)	FIL	1987	YES	YES	NO
Dribble	FIL	1985	NO	NO	YES
Duel 2000	Coktel Vision	1986	YES	YES	YES
Duel au Colorado	Chip	198?	YES	YES	YES
Echecs 3.7	Cobra Soft	198?	YES	YES	YES
Echo	Nathan	1982	NO	NO	YES
Echo-Flipper	Loriciels	1985	NO	NO	YES
Educatif 8 Cours'Auto	Cobra Soft	1986	NO	NO	YES
Einstein 1	Soft & Micro	1984	YES	YES	YES
Eliminator	Loriciels	1984	YES	YES	YES
Elmo 0	AFL Association Francaise pour la Lecture	1988	NO	NO	YES
Empire	Loriciels	1985	YES	NO	YES
Enduro Racer	FIL	1988	YES	YES	YES
Enigmatika	Answare	1984	YES	YES	YES
Enigmatika - 2ème Série	Answare	1984	NO	NO	YES
Enigmatika - 3ème Série	Answare	1984	NO	NO	YES
Enigmatika - 4ème Série	Answare	1984	NO	NO	YES
Enigmatika - 5ème Série	Answare	1984	NO	NO	YES
Enigme a Oxford	Coktel Vision	1986	YES	YES	YES
Ensemble Z	Shift Editions	1985	NO	NO	YES
Entropie	Infogrames	1987	NO	YES	YES
Equali	FIL	1988	NO	NO	YES
Erebus	EH Services	198?	YES	YES	YES
F.B.I.	Infogrames	1984	YES	YES	YES
F15 Strike Eagle	FIL	1987	YES	YES	YES
Fantome City	Coktel Vision	1987	NO	NO	YES
Félonies	ERE	1986	YES	YES	NO
Feu Vert	Nathan	1985	NO	NO	YES
Flash Point	FIL	1987	YES	YES	YES
Flipper	Loriciels	1984	YES	YES	NO
Football	Infogrames	1987	YES	YES	YES
Formule 1	FIL	1987	YES	YES	YES
Fox	Infogrames	1985	YES	YES	YES
Frogs (Jump for survival)	Jackson Soft / Free Game Blot	1986	YES	YES	YES
Galaxie Perdue	Sprites	1985	NO	NO	YES
Game Over	FIL	1987	YES	YES	YES
Garden Party	Free Game Blot		YES	YES	YES
Gemini	Nathan	1982	YES	YES	YES
Geodyssée	Coktel Vision	1985	YES	YES	NO
Gestion FIL	FIL	1986	NO	NO	YES
Giochi di Carte	Olivetti	1987	NO	YES	NO
Globe-Trotteur	EDIL Edition Informatique Logiciel	198?	NO	NO	YES
Glouton	Hebdogiciel	1986	YES	YES	YES
Graffiti	Free Game Blot	198?	NO	NO	YES
Grand Prix 500cc	Microids	1986	NO	YES	YES
Graphique	FIL	1985	NO	NO	YES
Gravitron, Valse Galactique	FIL	1985	YES	YES	YES
Green Beret	FIL	1986	YES	YES	YES
Grosses Têtes	Free Game Blot	198?	NO	NO	YES
Hacker	Loriciels	1986	YES	YES	YES
Histoire de Theatre	Free Game Blot	198?	YES	YES	YES
HMS Cobra	Cobra Soft	198?	YES	YES	NO
I.L. L'Intrus	Infogrames	1984	YES	YES	YES
Imperialis	Coktel Vision	1986	YES	YES	NO
Inca!	Novasoft	1985	YES	YES	NO
Indiana Thom	Sprites	1985	NO	NO	YES
Initiation aux Echecs	Nathan	1984	NO	NO	YES
Inspecteur Gadget	Nathan	1984	YES	YES	YES
Intox et Zoe	Loriciels	1984	YES	YES	NO
Invasion	Infogrames	1985	YES	NO	YES
IPT Androide	IPT	1985	NO	NO	YES
Isabelle et le Dragon	Hebdogiciel	1985	YES	YES	NO
Island	Micro Application	1984	YES	YES	NO
Iznogoud	Infogrames	1987	NO	YES	YES
James Debug - Le Grand Saut	Coktel Vision	198?	YES	YES	YES
Jeu de Boole	Hatier	1984	NO	NO	YES
Jeu Guinness des Records	Ediciel Matra & Hachette	198?	NO	NO	YES
Jeu Mondial des Inventions	Ediciel Matra & Hachette	1985	NO	NO	YES
Jeux	EDIL Edition Informatique Logiciel	198?	NO	NO	YES
Jeux sur TO7 et MO5	Sybex	1986	NO	NO	YES
Judoka	Nathan	1985	NO	NO	YES
Jungle Hero	Softbook	198?	YES	YES	YES
K.Y.A. - Keep Yourself Alive	Loriciels	1988	NO	YES	YES
Kanicula	TOTEK	1984	YES	YES	YES
Karate	Infogrames	1985	YES	YES	YES
Katuvu	Nathan	198?	NO	NO	YES
Khronos	Coktel Vision	1986	YES	YES	YES
Kidkit	Infogrames	1986	NO	NO	YES
Krakout	FIL	1987	YES	YES	YES
Kung Fou	SoftBook	1987	NO	NO	YES
La Bosse des Maths 3ème	Coktel Vision	1987	NO	NO	YES
La Bosse des Maths 4ème	Coktel Vision	1987	NO	NO	YES
La Bosse des Maths 5ème	Coktel Vision	1988	NO	NO	YES
La Bosse des Maths 6ème	Coktel Vision	1988	NO	NO	YES
La Clinique du Docteur Spounz	Shift Editions	198?	NO	NO	YES
La Geste d'Artillac	Infogrames	1985	YES	NO	YES
La Grille	ASELEC	1985	YES	YES	NO
La Maison d'Amedee	ASELEC	1984	YES	YES	NO
La Malediction de Thaar	Coktel Vision	1986	YES	YES	YES
La Marque Jaune	Cobra Soft	1988	NO	NO	YES
La Mascotte	Coktel Vision	1988	NO	NO	YES
La Mine aux Diamants	Infogrames	1986	YES	NO	YES
La Nuit des Templiers	FIL	1986	YES	YES	YES
La Peche a la Barre	ASELEC	1984	YES	YES	NO
La Planète Inconnue	FIL	1985	YES	YES	YES
La Princesse RIIM	Logimicro	1985	NO	NO	YES
La Ronde de l'Eau	FIL	1985	NO	NO	YES
Labyrinthe Survie	Nathan	1984	NO	NO	YES
L'affaire Sydney	Infogrames	1986	YES	YES	YES
L'affaire Vera Cruz	Infogrames	1986	YES	YES	YES
L'Aigle d'Or	Loriciels	198?	YES	YES	YES
Las Vegas	Infogrames	1985	YES	YES	YES
Le 5ème AXE	Loriciels	1985	YES	YES	YES
Le Bagh Chal (Le Tigre et les Chevres)	Free Game Blot	1985	YES	YES	YES
Le Chateau de la Mort	Cobra Soft	1985	NO	NO	YES
Le Composeur+	Infogrames	198?	NO	NO	YES
Le Compte est Rond	Hatier	1984	YES	YES	YES
Le Crepuscule du Naja	Chip	198?	NO	YES	YES
Le Général	Loriciels	198?	YES	YES	NO
Le Jeu des Marelles	Free Game Blot	198?	YES	YES	YES
Le Jeu des Petits Chevaux	EDIL Edition Informatique Logiciel	198?	NO	NO	YES
Le Maléfice des Atlantes	Chip	1987	NO	YES	YES
Le Minotaure	Hatier	1984	NO	NO	YES
Le Mystere de L'ile Perdue	Coktel Vision	1986	NO	NO	YES
Le Mystere de Paris	Coktel Vision	1988	NO	NO	YES
Le Pendu	CNDP Centre National de Documentation Pedagogique	1982	NO	NO	YES
Le Talisman d'Osiris	Chip	1986	NO	NO	YES
Le Temple de Quauhtli	Loriciels	1986	YES	YES	YES
Le Temps d'Une Historie	Infogrames	1987	NO	NO	YES
Le Tresor des Baskerville	Chip	198?	NO	NO	YES
Le Tresor des Rats d'Egout	Nathan	1986	NO	YES	YES
Le Tresor du Pirate	Free Game Blot	1984	YES	YES	YES
Legende	FIL	1986	NO	NO	YES
Les 7 Magiciens	TOTEK	1984	YES	YES	YES
Les Athletes	Infogrames	198?	NO	NO	YES
Les Athletes no.2 - 1ere Partie	Infogrames	198?	NO	NO	YES
Les Aventuriers - 1ere Partie	Infogrames	1988	NO	NO	YES
Les B.D.	Infogrames	1988	NO	NO	YES
Les Cavernes de Thénébé	Loriciels	198?	YES	YES	YES
Les Chevaliers	Infogrames	1988	NO	NO	YES
Les Chevaliers de l'An Mil	Ubi Soft	1989	NO	NO	YES
Les Contes de Monte-Crypto	Infogrames	1988	NO	NO	YES
Les Dieux de la Glisse (Olimpiadi Invernali)	Infogrames	1986	NO	YES	YES
Les Dieux de la Mer	Infogrames	1987	NO	YES	YES
Les Dieux du Stade	Infogrames	1988	YES	NO	YES
Les Dieux du Stade II	Infogrames	1986	YES	YES	YES
Les Enquetes de Monsieur Theophile	Hatier	1984	NO	NO	YES
Les Futuristes	Infogrames	1988	NO	NO	YES
Les Mutants	FIL	1987	NO	NO	YES
Les Ordifables	Larousse	1985	NO	NO	YES
Les Passagers du Vent	Infogrames	1986	NO	YES	YES
Les Passagers du Vent - Partie 2	Infogrames	1987	NO	NO	YES
Les Ripoux	Cobra Soft	1987	YES	YES	YES
L'Evade de Tapiocatraz	ERE	1986	NO	NO	YES
L'Heritage II (L'Eredità)	Infogrames	1986	NO	YES	NO
L'Intrus + Smurfy	Sprites	1985	NO	NO	YES
Lire les statistiques	Nathan	1985	NO	NO	YES
Logicod	Nathan	1982	NO	NO	YES
Lorann	Loriciels	1985	YES	YES	YES
Lucky Luke : Nitroglycérine	Coktel Vision	1987	NO	YES	NO
L'Usine Infernale + Extra-Mission	Shift Editions	1985	NO	NO	YES
Macadam Bumper	ERE	1989	YES	YES	YES
Mach 3	Loriciels	1987	NO	YES	YES
Mad Dog	EH Services	1989	YES	YES	NO
Magic	Titus	1987	NO	NO	YES
Mallette de Jeu Thomson	FIL	1987	NO	NO	YES
Mandragore	Infogrames	1984	YES	NO	YES
Marathon Cosmique	Hebdogiciel	1985	YES	YES	NO
Marche à l'Ombre	Infogrames	1987	NO	YES	YES
Masque	Ubi Soft	1989	NO	NO	YES
Mathematiques College	Nathan	1986	NO	NO	YES
Maxi Bourse International	Cobra Soft	1988	NO	NO	YES
Megawatt	Softbook	1987	YES	YES	YES
Melimemot	Nathan	1983	YES	YES	YES
Melodia	Nathan	1982	NO	NO	YES
Melodimus	Logimus	1984	YES	YES	YES
Menace sur l'Arctique	Chip	198?	NO	YES	YES
Mes Premiers Mots Croisés v1/1	Nathan	1983	YES	YES	NO
Mes Premiers Mots Croisés v1/2	Nathan	1983	YES	YES	NO
Mes Premiers Mots Croises Vol.1 & 2	Nathan	1983	NO	NO	YES
Meteo-7	Infogrames	1984	YES	YES	NO
Metro	Logimicro	1984	NO	NO	YES
Meurtre A Grande Vitesse	Cobra Soft	198?	NO	NO	YES
Meurtres en Serie	Cobra Soft	1987	NO	NO	YES
Meurtres sur l'Atlantique	Infogrames	1986	NO	NO	YES
Mewilo	Coktel Vision	1987	NO	NO	YES
MGT	Loriciels	1986	NO	YES	YES
Micro Serveur	FIL	1987	NO	NO	YES
Microjeux - Cocktail de Jeux 1	Nathan	1984	NO	NO	YES
Microjeux - Cocktail de Jeux 2	Nathan	1984	NO	NO	YES
Microjeux - Cocktail de Jeux 3	Nathan	1984	NO	NO	YES
Micro-Saviors Logiciels - ANQFRA	CNDP Centre National de Documentation Pedagogique	198?	NO	NO	YES
Micro-Saviors Logiciels - ANQMAT	CNDP Centre National de Documentation Pedagogique	198?	NO	NO	YES
Micro-Scrabble	FIL	1985	YES	YES	YES
Miner 2049er	TOTEK	198?	YES	YES	YES
Mini Bridge	EDIL Edition Informatique Logiciel	1986	NO	NO	YES
Minotaure 3D	Loriciels	1985	YES	NO	YES
Mission	Loriciels	1987	NO	YES	YES
Mission Ninja	Shift Editions	198?	NO	NO	YES
Mission pas possible	Infogrames	198?	YES	YES	YES
Mission Tres Speciale	Free Game Blot	1985	NO	NO	YES
Mission U-72	Hebdogiciel	1985	YES	YES	NO
Missions en Rafale	FIL	1987	YES	YES	YES
Monopolic	Free Game Blot	198?	YES	YES	YES
Monopoly	FIL	1986	YES	YES	YES
Monster Mine	FIL	1986	NO	NO	YES
Monte-Carlo	Loriciels	1984	YES	YES	NO
Mots Croises Magiques	Nathan	1986	NO	NO	YES
Motus	Nathan		YES	YES	YES
Mystere des Rois Perdus	Hatier	198?	NO	NO	YES
Nova Sprites	Sprites	198?	NO	NO	YES
Numero 10	FIL	1985	YES	YES	YES
Numero 10 Mexico 86	FIL	1985	YES	YES	YES
Oceania	Loriciels	1985	YES	NO	YES
Octogonus	TOTEK	1984	YES	YES	YES
OK Cowboy	Infogrames	1987	NO	YES	YES
Omega planète invisible	Infogrames	1985	YES	NO	NO
Operation Nemo	Coktel Vision	1986	NO	NO	YES
Orbital Mission	Coktel Vision	1986	YES	YES	NO
Ordibaby	Cobra Soft	1986	NO	NO	YES
Orthocrack 1	Hatier	1984	NO	NO	YES
Orthocrack 2	Hatier	1984	NO	NO	YES
Orthocrack 3	Hatier	1984	NO	NO	YES
Oxphar	ERE	1987	YES	YES	YES
Panique Atomique chez NovaSprites	SoftBook	1985	NO	NO	YES
Paragraphe	FIL	1985	NO	NO	YES
Paris 92 - Jeux Olympiques	Infogrames	1986	NO	NO	YES
Paysage a,b,c	Jeriko	1985	NO	NO	YES
Peter Pan	Coktel Vision	1988	NO	NO	YES
Phonemia	FIL	1985	NO	NO	YES
Pictor	Nathan	198?	YES	YES	YES
Pilot	Infogrames	1984	YES	YES	YES
Pingo	Infogrames	1984	YES	YES	YES
Plymouth-Newport	Sprites	1985	NO	NO	YES
Poker	Gasoline Software	1986	YES	NO	YES
Pole Position	Shift Editions	198?	NO	NO	YES
Politik Poker	Infogrames	1986	NO	NO	YES
Politique Economique	Answare	1984	YES	YES	NO
Pop Pop	Minipuce	1985	NO	NO	YES
Portrait Hebdogiciel no. 53	Shift Editions	1984	NO	NO	YES
Poseidon	Coktel Vision	1986	YES	YES	YES
Pour 20 millions de dollars	Loriciels	198?	YES	YES	YES
Pouss Ball	TOTEK	1984	YES	YES	NO
Pouvoir	Loriciels	1986	NO	NO	YES
Praxitele (FIL)	FIL	1987	NO	NO	YES
Preterite Star	EDIL Edition Informatique Logiciel	1984	NO	NO	YES
Prohibition	Infogrames	1987	NO	YES	YES
Prolog	FIL	1986	NO	NO	YES
Pulsar II	Loriciels	1984	YES	YES	YES
PV 2000	TOTEK	1983	NO	NO	YES
Pythagore	Hatier	1984	NO	NO	YES
Qrisp	ERE	198?	YES	YES	NO
Quad	Microids	198?	NO	YES	YES
Quest	Nathan	1983	NO	NO	YES
Raid sur la Manche	FIL	1987	NO	NO	YES
Raid sur Tenere	Coktel Vision	198?	NO	NO	YES
Ranger 3	Loriciels	1987	NO	NO	YES
Régates	Nathan	1985	NO	NO	YES
Renegade	FIL	1988	YES	YES	NO
Reussites	FIL	1987	NO	NO	YES
Reverse	Gasoline Software	198?	YES	YES	YES
Risk	Shift Editions	1986	NO	NO	YES
Road Killer	SoftBook	1987	NO	NO	YES
Robinson Crusoe	Coktel Vision	1987	NO	NO	YES
Rodeo	Microids	1985	YES	YES	YES
Roger et Paulo	Infogrames	1984	YES	YES	YES
Romulus - Rome et Moi	Free Game Blot	198?	YES	YES	YES
Rotorwar	Nathan	1984	NO	NO	YES
Routithom	CNDP Centre National de Documentation Pedagogique	1986	NO	NO	YES
Runway	FIL	1985	YES	YES	YES
Runway II	FIL	1986	YES	YES	YES
Rythmamus	Logimus	1984	YES	YES	NO
S.O.S. J'apprends le Morse	Free Game Blot	1985	NO	NO	YES
S.O.S. Space	Minipuce	198?	NO	NO	YES
San Pablo	Coktel Vision	1985	YES	YES	YES
Saphir + Editeur	Infogrames	1986	YES	YES	NO
Sapiens	Loriciels	1986	YES	YES	YES
Scalextric	Leisure Genius	1987	NO	NO	YES
Scarfinger - La Moto Infernale	Infogrames	1985	YES	YES	YES
Scriptor	TOTEK	1984	NO	NO	YES
Scrontch	Nathan	1984	YES	YES	YES
Sigma Base	Infogrames	1986	NO	NO	YES
Silent Service	FIL	1987	NO	YES	YES
Slap Fight	FIL	1987	YES	YES	YES
Soleil Noir	Microids	1985	YES	YES	YES
Sorcery	Infogrames	1986	YES	YES	YES
Sortilèges	Infogrames	1986	YES	YES	YES
Space Game	Free Game Blot	1987	YES	YES	YES
Space Racer	Loriciels	1988	NO	YES	YES
Space Shuttle Simulator	Loriciels	1984	YES	YES	YES
Space Tunnel	SoftBook	1987	NO	NO	YES
Speedway	Free Game Blot	1986	NO	NO	YES
Speedy Wonder	Minipuce	1986	NO	NO	YES
Spindizzy	Loriciels	1986	NO	NO	YES
Spix	Infogrames	1984	YES	YES	YES
Sports d'Eté	FIL	1988	YES	YES	YES
St. Tropez	Sprites	198?	NO	NO	YES
Stanley	Loriciels	1984	YES	YES	NO
Stone Zone	Softbook	198?	YES	YES	YES
Stress + Le Chateau de la Mort	Cobra Soft	198?	NO	NO	YES
Super Androides	Infogrames	1986	NO	NO	YES
Super Business	FIL	1985	NO	NO	YES
Super Disk Compilation	Super Disk Soft.	198?	NO	NO	YES
Super Flippard	Free Game Blot	1987	NO	YES	YES
Super Jimmie	Minipuce & Microstory	1985	YES	YES	YES
Super Ski	Microids	1988	NO	YES	YES
Super Taquin	Mipso	1984	NO	NO	YES
Super Tennis	Answare	1985	YES	YES	YES
Survivor	Nathan	1982	NO	NO	YES
Sympuz	No Man's Land	1984	YES	YES	YES
Synthetia	Nathan	1984	NO	NO	YES
T.N.T.	Infogrames	1986	YES	YES	YES
Tablut	Free Game Blot	198?	NO	NO	YES
Taquin	TOTEK	1984	YES	YES	NO
Telerama No. 1	Nathan	1984	NO	NO	YES
Telerama No. 2	Nathan	1984	NO	NO	YES
Temple of Apshai Trilogy	Epyx	1985	NO	NO	YES
TEODRIVE Demos - Mots Croises + Anima 3D	ASCI	1991	NO	NO	YES
Teo-Games no.1	ASCI	1991	NO	NO	YES
Teo-Games no.2	ASCI	1991	NO	NO	YES
Teo-Games no.3	ASCI	1991	NO	NO	YES
Teo-Games no.4	ASCI	1991	NO	NO	YES
Teo-Games no.5	ASCI	1991	NO	NO	YES
Teo-Games no.6	ASCI	1991	NO	NO	YES
Territoire	Logimicro	1985	NO	NO	YES
The Greatest Collection	Free Game Blot	1987	NO	NO	YES
The Way of the Tiger	FIL	1986	YES	YES	YES
Theme Astral	Infogrames	198?	NO	NO	YES
Theogiciels Loisir 1	Micropresse	1984	YES	YES	NO
Thom-Puzz	No Man's Land	1984	NO	NO	YES
Threshold	TOTEK	1984	NO	NO	YES
Tic-Tac	Loriciels	1984	YES	YES	NO
Top Chrono	Loriciels	1985	YES	YES	NO
Topgun	FIL	1987	YES	YES	YES
Torann Mission Blue 5	Loriciels	198?	YES	YES	NO
Tout Schuss	FIL	1987	YES	YES	YES
Toutankhamon	No Man's Land	1985	YES	YES	YES
Toutenmath	CNDP Centre National de Documentation Pedagogique	1986	NO	NO	YES
Traitement Bzzz	Chip	198?	NO	YES	YES
Trap	Nathan	1982	YES	YES	YES
Tridi444	Nathan	1982	YES	YES	YES
Trivial Pursuit	Ubi Soft	198?	NO	NO	YES
Troff	Infogrames	1983	YES	YES	YES
Turbo Cup	Loriciels	1988	NO	YES	YES
Tyrann	Norsoft	1985	YES	NO	YES
Une Affaire en Or	Free Game Blot	198?	YES	YES	YES
Vampir Action	Editions Mondiales	1987	NO	NO	YES
Vampire	Infogrames	1986	YES	YES	YES
Vie et Mort des Dinosaures	Infogrames	1986	YES	YES	YES
Vin sur Vin	Infogrames	1984	NO	NO	YES
Visa pour Hyde Park	Coktel Vision	1988	YES	YES	YES
Vision	Loriciels	1984	YES	YES	NO
Voici Mona Lisa	FIL	1985	NO	NO	YES
Vol Solo	FIL	1986	NO	YES	YES
Votez Pour Moi	Answare	1985	YES	YES	NO
Wargame	Free Game Blot	198?	NO	NO	YES
Wizball	FIL	1988	YES	YES	YES
World War 3	Free Game Blot	198?	YES	YES	NO
Wormy - Junior Computhink	Hatier	1984	NO	NO	YES
X-Ray	Microïds	1986	NO	NO	YES
Yahtzee	Hebdogiciel	1985	YES	YES	NO
Yeti	Loriciels	1984	YES	YES	YES
Yie Ar Kung-Fu II	FIL	1986	YES	YES	YES
Zéro de Conduite	Sprites	1984	NO	NO	YES
Zero Faute	EDIL Edition Informatique Logiciel	198?	NO	NO	YES
Zorro	FIL	1985	NO	NO	YES

== See also ==
- Microsoft BASIC 1.0 - A version of BASIC used on Thomson computers
- Thomson EF936x - graphic chip used on Thomson computers
- Computing for All, a French government plan to introduce computers to the country's pupils
