= The Computer Edition of Risk: The World Conquest Game =

1989 video game

Risk: The World Conquest Game
- Publisher: Virgin Mastertronic
- Platforms: Amiga, Apple II, Atari ST, Commodore 64, MS-DOS, Mac
- Release: 1989
- Genres: Board, wargame
- Mode: Single-player

Risk: The World Conquest Game is a computer wargame developed by Virgin Mastertronic in 1989 for MS-DOS. It is based on the board game Risk.

== Gameplay ==
The player can play against up to five computer opponents. The player can select to play using either the British or American version of Risk, with either version of the extra armies cards.

== Reception ==
Computer Gaming World stated that while the computer version offered the convenience of an automated opponent for solitary players, the board game would likely be more fun for most because they would not have to crowd around the computer, which could not easily display the entire world at once.

M. Evan Brooks reviewed the computer editions of Risk, Monopoly, Scrabble, and Clue for Computer Gaming World, and stated that "In this reviewer's opinion, Scrabble is the weakest product (given cumbersome play and graphics), while Risk and Clue: Master Detective are the strongest."

The game was reviewed in 1990 in Dragon #156 by Hartley, Patricia, and Kirk Lesser in "The Role of Computers" column. The reviewers gave the game 5 out of 5 stars.
