= DCEbus =

Late 20th century computer bus standard

DCEbus is a computer bus standard, originally developed for industrial control computers interfacing to the "real world" by the Belgian company Data Applications International. It is physically based on Eurocard sizes, mechanicals and 31-pin connectors (DIN 41617 similar to the DIN 41612 but simpler), and using its own signalling system, which Eurocard does not define. It was first developed in 1970 but was never adopted by any other company.

The 24 I/O lines available on the DCEbus (from an Intel 8255 of the controlling computer) could be used directly, or could use the "DCE bus mode", in which the 24 I/O lines were grouped in three groups of eight I/O lines, of which the first group was used for data, and of the second group two were used for read and write strobes, and one for "bus expansion", the third group was used for eight "card address lines". Most often these setup was used to control another Intel 8255 on the actual interface card. The remaining seven pins of the 31-pin DIN connector were used for power and ground signals.

== Available cards ==
About twenty interface cards were available:

- RWC-T24 Generic TTL interface module
- RWC-D12 Isolated digital input and output module
- RWC-DI24 Isolated digital input module
- RWC-AI Analog Input module
- RWC-V8/16 Analog high speed Data Acquisition module
- RWC-A02 Analog Output module
- RWC-CCE Double serial communication module
- RWC-SLD Serial linecontrol module
- RWC-MC/DC DC Current control module
- RWC-HC/DC DC Large current control module
- RWC-PTM Position and temperature measurement module
- RWC-MUX 4-wire multiplex module
- RWC-IEC IEC (IEEE) Bus module
- RWC-F Experimental module
- RWC-SBM Bus system monitor
- RWC-PWR Power supply
- RWC-PWR/H Power supply larger systems
- RWC-PRG EPROM programmer module
- RWC-FM/BSC Bisynchronous serial IBM protocol
