= Clue: Master Detective =

1989 video game

- Developer: Dalali Software
- Publisher: Virgin Mastertronic
- Platforms: Amiga, Apple II, Atari ST, Commodore 64, MS-DOS
- Release: 1989: Apple II, MS-DOS; 1990: Amiga, ST, C64
- Genre: Board game

Clue: Master Detective is a video game published in 1989 under the Leisure Genius label of Virgin Mastertronic. It is an adaptation of the board game Cluedo, known as Clue in North America.

== Reception ==
M. Evan Brooks reviewed the computer editions of Risk, Monopoly, Scrabble, and Clue for Computer Gaming World, and stated that "In this reviewer's opinion, Scrabble is the weakest product (given cumbersome play and graphics), while Risk and Clue: Master Detective are the strongest."

Run found the need to look at the screen without other players seeing it to be awkward, but complimented the sound, graphics, and strategic elements. The magazine concluded, "It is a very satisfying way to play Sherlock Holmes on your very own C-64."
