= Thomson TO9+ =

1986 French computer model

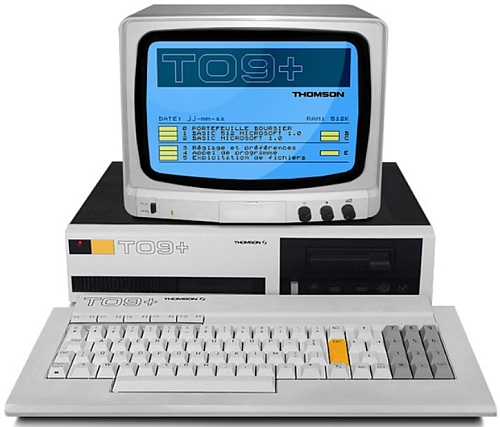
- Thomson TO9+
- Manufacturer: Thomson SA
- Released: 1986; 40 years ago
- Introductory price: 7 490 FF
- Operating system: Basic 512, Basic 1.0 and Disk Basic
- CPU: Motorola 6809E, 1 MHz
- Memory: 512 KB RAM; 80 KB ROM
- Storage: disc drive, tape (optional)
- Graphics: Thomson EF9369, 640 × 200
- Sound: 3 channels, 7 octaves
- Input: 81-key AZERTY keyboard, light pen
- Controller input: joystick, mouse
- Connectivity: modem
- Backward compatibility: Thomson TO8
- Predecessor: Thomson TO9

The Thomson TO9+ is a home computer introduced by French company Thomson SA in 1986. It kept the professional look of the Thomson TO9 by using a separate keyboard (lower end models usually had an integrated keyboard).

It's based on the Thomson TO8 and fully compatible with it. This also enables it to run Thomson MO6 software. The computer was designed to be used as a Minitel server and has a built-in V23 modem (with a speed of 1200/75 baud). This feature was accessible under BASIC and from the communication software that came with the computer. The machine was sold with a word processing program ("Paragraphe"), a database ("Fiches et Dossiers") and a spreadsheet ("Multiplan").

Compared with the TO9, the TO9+ added:

- Basic 512
- 512 KB RAM
- double-sided floppy disk drive (640 kB)
- integrated modem
- two ports for mice or joysticks
