= Monopoly (1984 video game) =

1984 video game

- Publisher: Leisure Genius
- Platforms: Amiga, Amstrad CPC, BBC Micro, Commodore 64, MS-DOS, MSX, Tatung Einstein, Thomson MO, Thomson TO, ZX Spectrum
- Release: 1984
- Genres: Strategy, board game

Monopoly is a video game based on the board game Monopoly, published for the Commodore 64 in 1984 by Leisure Genius. Versions were later released for the Amiga, Amstrad CPC, BBC Micro, MS-DOS, MSX, Tatung Einstein, Thomson MO, Thomson TO, and ZX Spectrum. This title was one of many inspired by the property.

== Gameplay ==
The game contains very similar gameplay to the board game it is based on, with various physical tasks being replaced by automation and digital representations.

== Reception ==
The game replaced Ghostbusters at the top of the Boots Commodore 64 chart in late 1984.

Computer Shopper praised the game for its graphics and animation, and deemed it "excellent value". Your Spectrum thought the game was an "excellent conversion" of the board game, while Sinclair User wrote that the game was "very boring".

In 1990, M. Evan Brooks reviewed the computer editions of Risk, Monopoly, Scrabble, and Clue for Computer Gaming World, and stated that "Monopoly has been released in numerous shareware and public domain versions which thereby weaken its standing."

When the game was released for the Amiga in 1991, Amiga Power deemed it a "sound conversion" albeit more expensive than its source material, while another from the same publication said it was competent but "arguably quite pointless".
