= DAI Personal Computer =

Home computer released in 1980

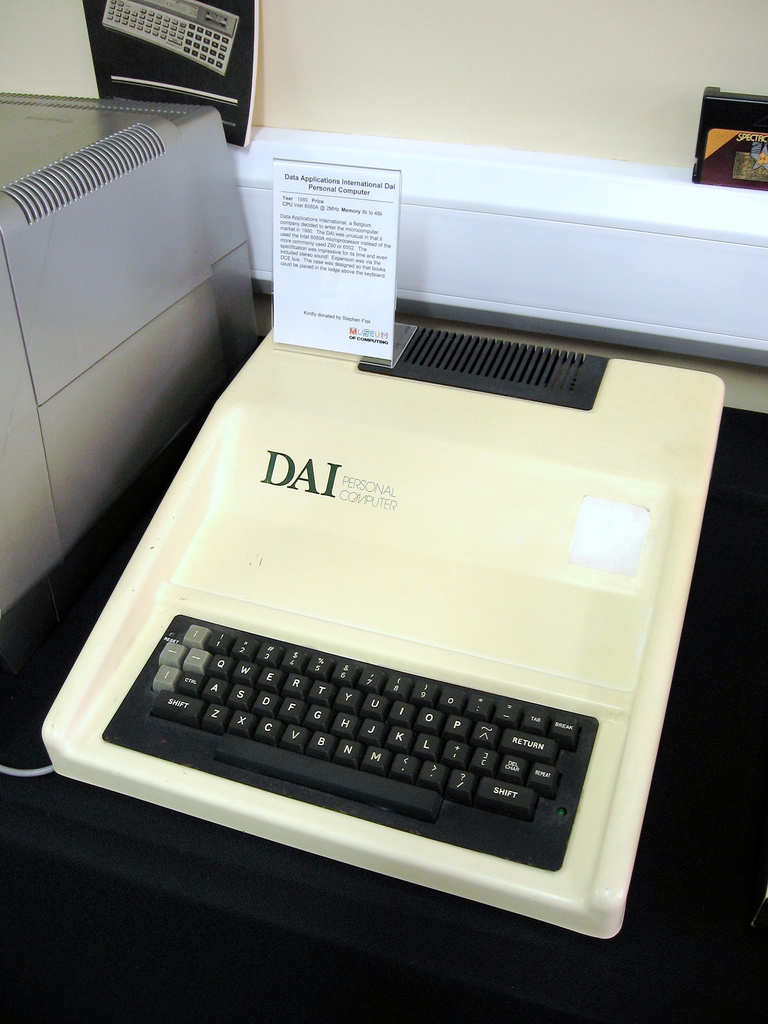
- Manufacturer: Data Applications International
- Type: Home computer
- Released: 1980
- Introductory price: 1300 € (France, november 1981)
- Discontinued: 1984
- Operating system: DAI BASIC, Assembler
- CPU: Intel 8080A @ 2 MHz
- Memory: 48 kB
- Removable storage: Audio Cassette
- Display: RF out; 88 x 65, 176 x 130, 352 x 260, 528 x 240 pixels; 4 or 16 colors
- Graphics: Thomson EF9369
- Sound: AY-3-8910
- Connectivity: Parallel port, RGB video out, RS232c, DCE bus, cassette tape (600 bauds), stereo audio out

The DAI personal computer is an early home computer from the Belgian company Data Applications International. The DAI came to market in 1980. It provided many pioneering features such as high resolution color graphics, a maths co-processor, and a pre-compiling BASIC interpreter. It never became a commercial success.

Contemporary reviews noticed the lack of application packages, with the computer appealing more for programmers.

== History ==
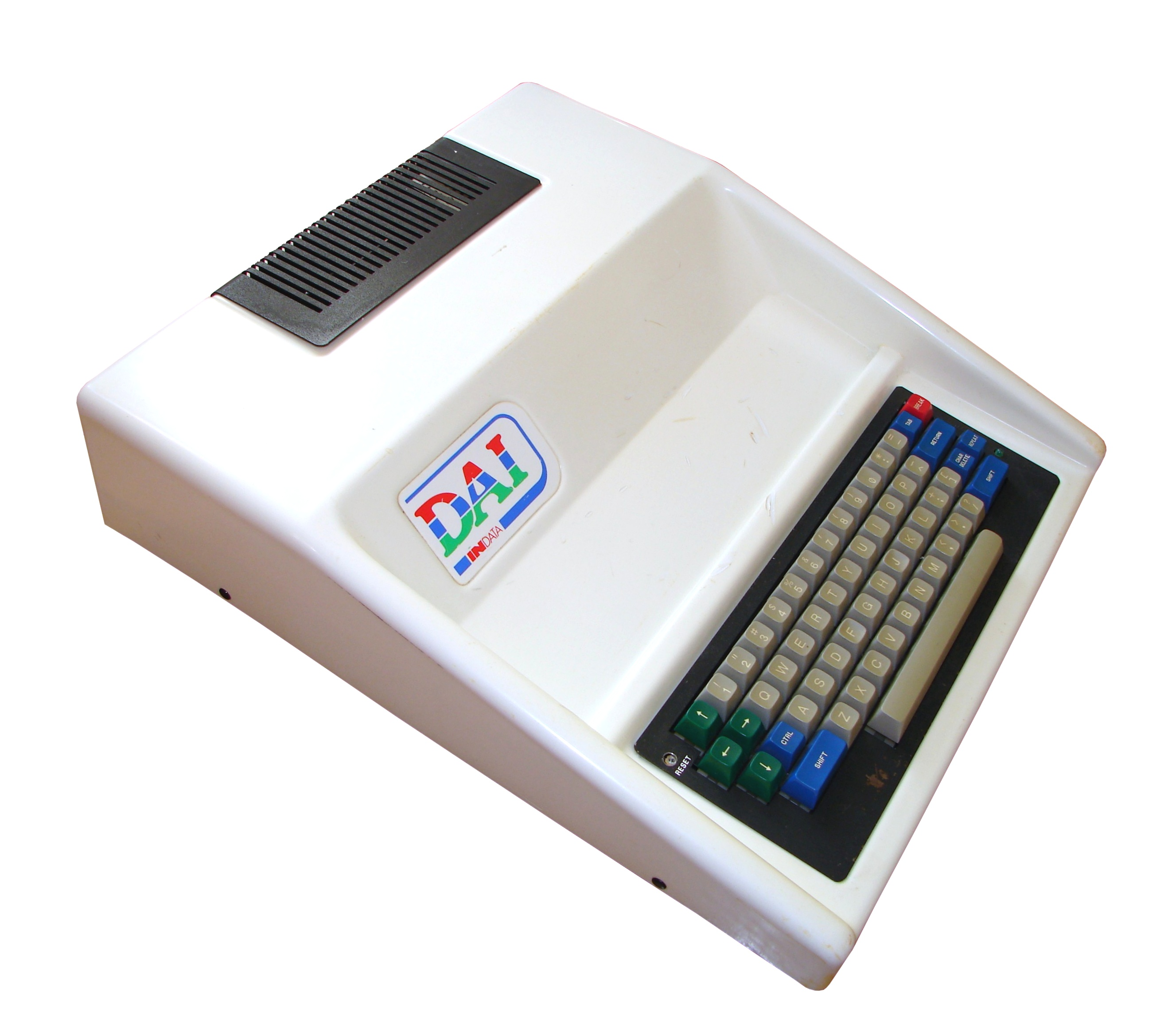
A later version of the DAI Personal Computer produced by InData.

The computer was initially designed by DAI for the UK subsidiary of Texas Instruments for use with the PAL televisions used in Britain. Texas Instruments US did not want to build a PAL version of their TI-99/4A home computer, although they subsequently authorized one after they saw the DAI.

The Dutch educational TV broadcast company Teleac wanted to use the DAI to teach computing, some years before the BBC's similar initiative using the BBC Micro. However, they chose the Exidy Sorcerer instead, because the DAI was not completely ready.

In France the machine sold for €1300 by November 1981, €1365 by November 1982 and €1021 by September 1983.

The machine was also used to create graphics for TV programs in the early 1980s.

After DAI filed for bankruptcy in 1982, InData (a Prodata spin-off) continued producing and selling the machine up to 1984.

== DAI the company ==
Data Applications International (DAI) was a company from the end of the 1970s to the early 1980s based at Dreve de Renards 6, Brussels that was specialized in creating "Real World Cards", computer peripheral cards based on their own proprietary DCEbus, which in essence consists of three groups of eight I/O lines (coming from an Intel 8255) . These were Eurocard compatible cards in a 19-inch rack. Most cards were also based on a single Intel 8255 chip. Around 1977 they designed the DAI Personal Computer. On May 6, 1982 the company went bankrupt.

== Video games ==
There are six known commercially released games for DAI Personal Computer.

Title	Release year	Publisher
Chasse Sous-marine	198?	Data Applications International
Daylaxians	1983	Dialog Informatique
De Acrobaten	198?	Data Applications International
Jeu de Morpion	198?	Data Applications International
Le Chateau des Sortileges	198?	Data Applications International
Mensch Ärgere Dich Nicht	1982	Sigg, M.

== See also ==
- TI99/4A
- BBC Micro
- Exidy Sorcerer
