= Silent Service II =

1990 video game

- Developer(s): MPS Labs
- Publisher(s): MicroProse
- Designer(s): Arnold Hendrick; Roy B. Gibson
- Programmer(s): Roy B. Gibson
- Artist(s): Kim Biscoe
- Writer(s): Arnold Hendrick
- Composer(s): Jeffery L. Briggs
- Series: Silent Service
- Platform(s): Amiga, Atari ST, MS-DOS
- Release: NA: 1990-1991
- Genre(s): Submarine simulator
- Mode(s): Single-player

Silent Service II is a submarine simulation game developed and published by MicroProse for MS-DOS in 1990 and for the Amiga in 1991. It is a sequel to 1985's Silent Service, also set in the Pacific Ocean during World War II. Tommo purchased the rights to this game and digitally publishes it through its Retroism brand in 2015.

== Gameplay ==
Silent Service II allows the player to choose either single scenarios (training, a single historical battle, or a single random encounter war patrol) or an extended war career. In the career mode, the player undertakes a number of consecutive patrols in the submarine, meeting other ships or convoys in unscripted encounters generated by the game. The player is able to select a home port and a patrol area on a map of the Pacific Ocean, and time acceleration allowed the submarine to move quickly to the chosen area. The length of each patrol is limited by the submarine's available fuel, but a typical war career can still take several hours of play time to complete. Common encounters involve the detection of a merchant ship or convoy, with the player determining whether and how to attack. On other occasions the player may face sudden detection by warships and be forced to act quickly to escape.

Several different viewpoints are available, including the bridge, the periscope (usable either submerged or surfaced), the navigation area with the map, and internal status displays. Other ships are displayed as sprites in the bridge or periscope views. The MS-DOS version of the game uses up to 256 colors.

== Reception ==
Computer Gaming World praised Silent Service II, citing its excellent graphics, "amazing" sound card audio, and seven accurate submarine types. It concluded that the game "teaches historical lessons worthy of a graduate seminar in modern American history" while exciting as "a mammoth roller-coaster". 1991 and 1993 surveys of strategy and war games in that magazine gave it four and a half stars out of five.
