= Thomson TO7/70 =

1984 French computer model

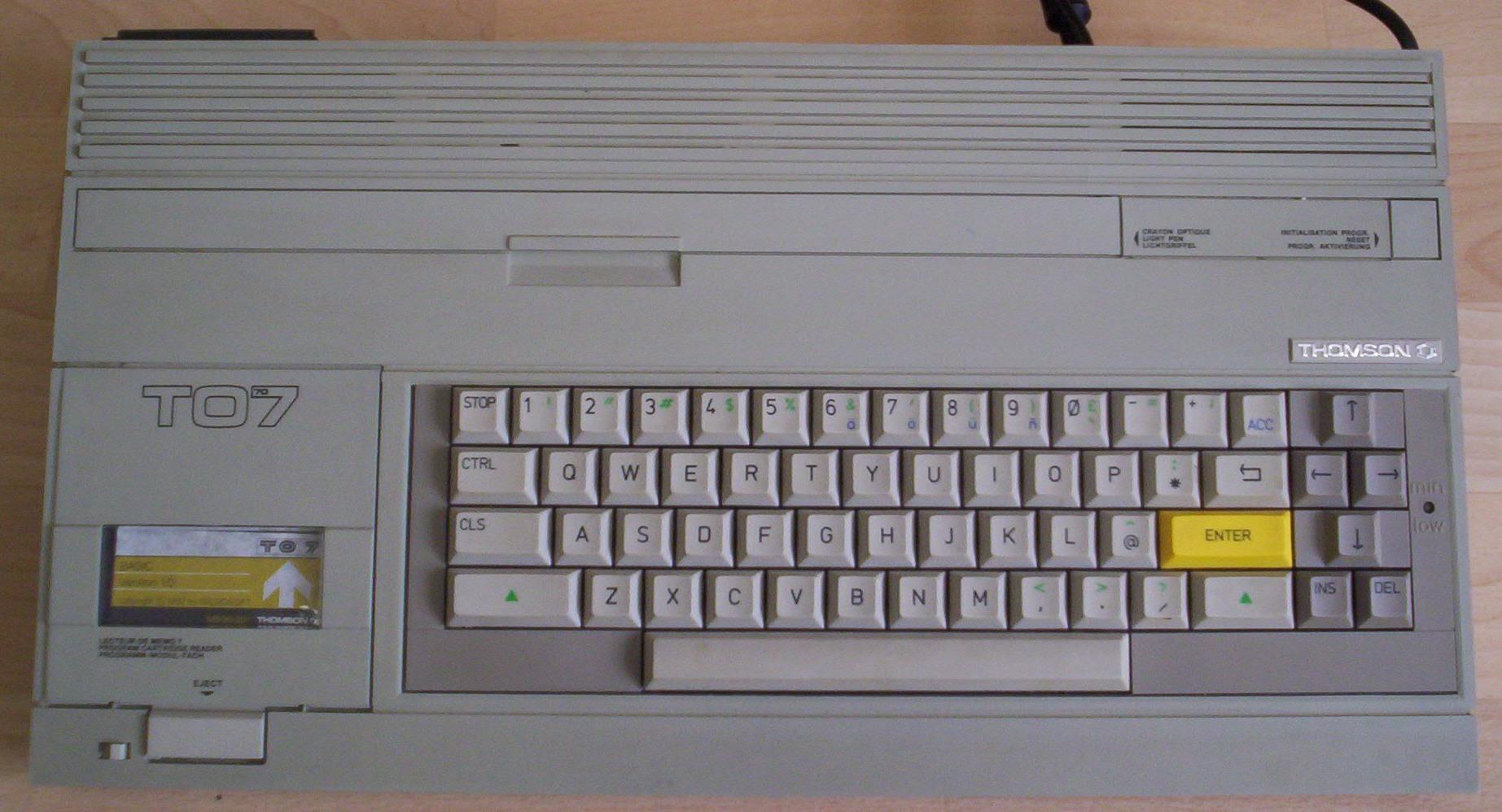
- Developer: Thomson SA
- Type: Home computer
- Generation: 8-bit
- Released: France: 1984; 42 years ago
- Introductory price: 3590 FF
- Media: Cassette tape, MEMO7 cartridges
- Operating system: Basic 1.0 (in cartridge)
- CPU: Motorola 6809E @ 1 MHz
- Memory: 64 KB RAM
- Display: 320 × 200, 16 colours
- Graphics: Motorola MCA1300 gate array
- Predecessor: Thomson TO7
- Successor: Thomson TO8, Thomson TO9, Thomson TO9+

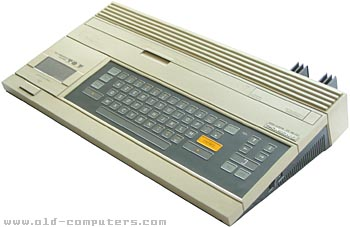
A Thomson T07/70 variation with membrane keyboard

The Thomson TO7/70, is an upgraded version of the Thomson TO7, released in 1984 with an introductory price of 3590 FF. It was used as an educational tool in French schools under the Computing for All plan, where the TO7/70 could be used as a "nano-machine" terminal for the "Nanoréseau" educational network.

Among improvements, RAM was increased to 64 KB ("70" on the version name stands for 70 KB of memory: 64 KB RAM + 6 KB ROM), the 6809 processor was replaced by a Motorola 6809E, and the colour palette was extended from 8 to 16 colours.

Graphics were similar to the Thomson MO5 and generated by a Motorola MCA1300 gate array capable of 40×25 text display and a resolution of 320 × 200 pixels with 16 colours (limited by 8 × 1 pixel colour attribute areas). The colour palette is 4-bit RGBI, with 8 basic RGB colours and a intensity bit (called P for "Pastel") that controlled saturation ("saturated" or "pastel").

Software developed for the TO-7 can be run on the TO-7/70, but the reverse is not possible. At least three games were released for the TO7/70.

== See also ==
- Computing for All, a French government plan to introduce computers to the country's pupils
