= The Silent Service (book) =

Book by Ion Idriess

- First edition
- Author: Ion Idriess; Tom Jones
- Language: English
- Genre: non-fiction
- Publisher: Angus and Robertson
- Publication date: 1944
- Publication place: Australia

The Silent Service: Action Stories of the Anzac Navy is a 1944 non-fiction book by Ion Idriess in collaboration with Torpedoman Tom Jones, a navy man of 17 years experience. It contains 54 different stories about the achievements of the Royal Australian Navy in World War II.

It includes accounts of the Battle of the River Plate, Battle of Dakar, sinking of the Richilieu, the Siege of Malta, the Battle of the Java Sea, the Battle of Cape Matapan and the Battle of the Coral Sea.
