= Thomson TO7 =

1982 French computer model

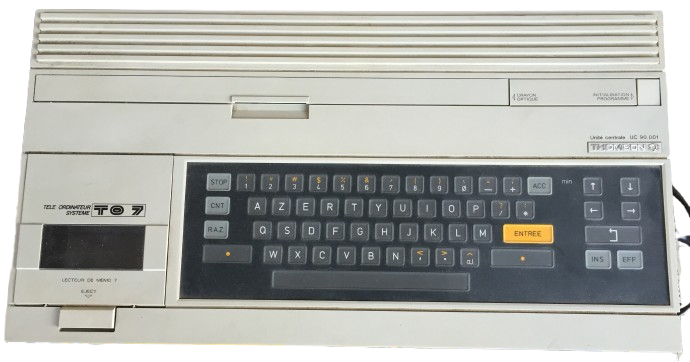
- Thomson TO7 computer
- Developer: Thomson SA
- Type: Home computer
- Generation: 8-bit
- Released: France: 1 December 1982; 43 years ago
- Lifespan: 1982–1984
- Introductory price: 3750 FF
- Discontinued: May 1984
- Units sold: More than 40000 produced
- Media: Cassette tape, MEMO7 cartridges
- Operating system: Basic 1.0 (in cartridge)
- CPU: Motorola 6809 @ 1 MHz
- Memory: 22 KB RAM, 4KB ROM, 16KB cartridges
- Display: 320 × 200, 8 colours (2 colour constraint for each 8×1 pixels)
- Successor: Thomson TO7/70

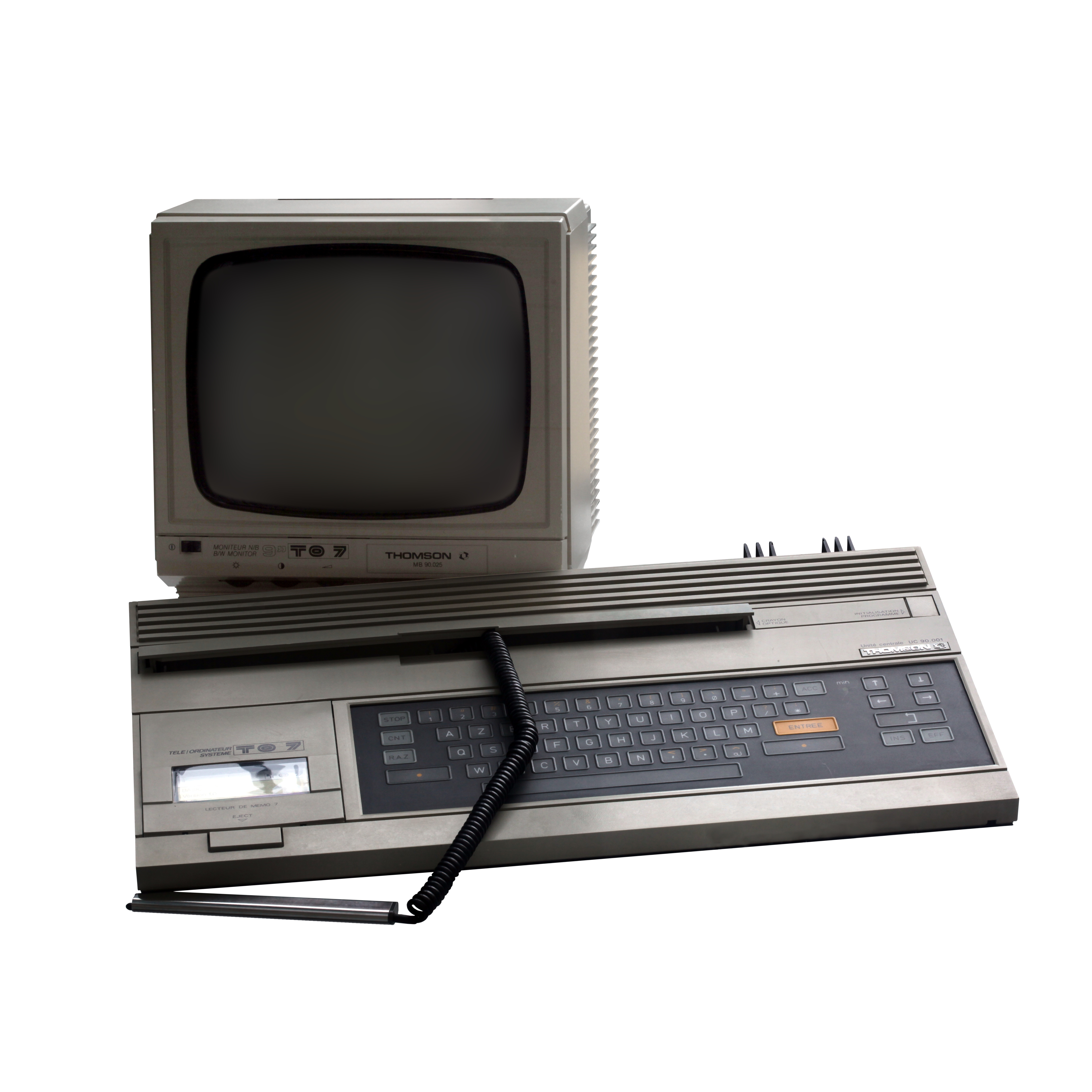
Thomson TO7 with monitor, on display at the Musée Bolo

The Thomson TO7, also called Thomson 9000 is a home computer introduced by Thomson SA in November 1982, with an original retail price of 3750 FF. By 1983 over 40000 units were produced. About 84 games were released for the TO7.

The TO7 is built around a 1 MHz Motorola 6809 processor. ROM cartridges, designed as MEMO7, can be introduced through a memory bay. The user interface uses Microsoft BASIC, included in the kit cartridge. The keyboard features a plastic membrane, and further user input is obtained through a lightpen. Cooling is provided by a rear radiator. A standard television can serve as a monitor using a RGB SCART (Peritel) connector, with a resolution of 320×200 (with 2 colours for each 8×1 pixels).

The TO7 prototype, called Thomson T9000, was developed in 1980. The differences regarding the production model are a different startup menu and buggier BIOS.

An updated version with more memory capacity, the Thomson TO7/70, was released in 1984.

== Specifications ==
The Thomson TO7 runs on a Motorola 6809 processor clocked at 1 MHz and features 22 KB of RAM (8 KB for the user, 8 KB used as video memory and 8K × 6 bits colour memory) and 20KB of ROM (4KB for the monitor and 16KB on MEMO7 cartridges).

As common on home computers designed to be connected to an ordinary TV screen, the 320 × 200 pixels active area doesn't cover the entire screen, and is surrounded by a border. Graphics were limited to a 3-bit RGB hardware palette (8 colours generated by combination of RGB primaries) with proximity constraints (2 colours for each 8×1 pixel area). The video output is RGB on a SCART connector, with the refresh rate being 625-line compatible 50 Hz.

Audio featured a single channel sound generator with five octaves. A "game expansion" was capable of four channel, six-octave sound.

The keyboard has 58 keys and includes arrow keys.

Besides cartridges, the machine used cassette tapes for file storage.

== See also ==
- Computing for All, a French government plan to introduce computers to the country's pupils
- Thomson TO7/70
