= Thomson MO5 =

1984 French computer model

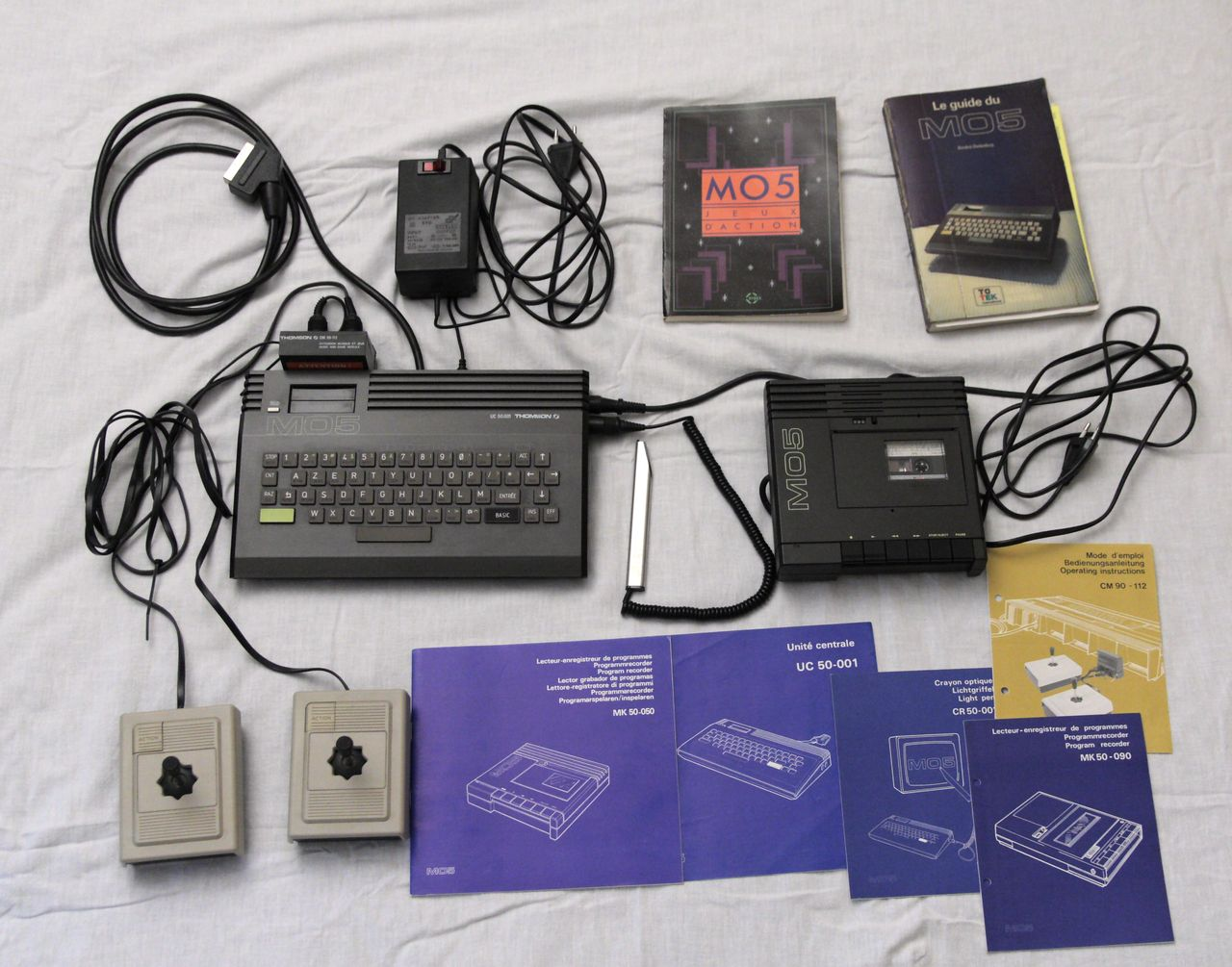
- Thomson MO5
- Manufacturer: Thomson SA
- Released: 1984; 42 years ago
- Introductory price: 2390 FF
- Discontinued: 1986; 40 years ago
- Media: Cassette tape, Cartridges
- Operating system: MO5 BASIC 1.0
- CPU: Motorola 6809E @ 1 MHz
- Memory: 32 KB RAM, 16 KB VRAM
- Display: 320×200, 8 colours with 2 saturation variations, 2 colours per 8×1 pixel area
- Graphics: EFGJ03L gate array
- Sound: 1-bit square wave
- Input: Keyboard, Lightpen
- Controller input: Joystick
- Connectivity: Expansion port
- Successor: Thomson MO6
- Related: Thomson TO7/70

The Thomson MO5 is a home computer introduced in France in June 1984 to compete against systems such as the ZX Spectrum and Commodore 64. It had a release price of 2390 FF.

At the same time, Thomson also released the up-market Thomson TO7/70 machine. The MO5 was not sold in vast quantities outside France and was largely discontinued in favour of the improved Thomson MO6 in 1986.

MO5s were used as educational tools in French schools for a period (see Computing for All, a French government plan to introduce computers to the country's pupils), and could be used as a "nano-machine" terminal for the "Nanoréseau" educational network.

The computer boots directly to the built-in Microsoft BASIC interpreter (MO5 Basic 1.0).

== Specifications ==
The Thomson MO5 runs on a Motorola 6809E processor clocked at 1 MHz and features 48 KB of RAM (16 KB used as video memory, 32 KB as free user RAM) and 16 KB of ROM (4 KB for the monitor and 12 KB for the BASIC interpreter).

Graphics were generated by a EFGJ03L (or MA4Q-1200) gate array capable of 40 × 25 text display and a resolution of 320 × 200 pixels with 16 colours (limited by 8 × 1 pixel colour attribute areas). The hardware colour palette is 4-bit RGBI, with eight basic RGB (red, green, blue) colours and a intensity bit (called P for "Pastel") that controlled saturation ("saturated" or "pastel"). In memory, the bit order was PBGR. The desaturated colours were obtained by mixing of the original RGB components within the video hardware. This is done by a PROM circuit, where a two bit mask controls colour mixing ratios of 0%, 33%, 66% and 100% of the saturated hue. This approach allows the display of Orange instead of "desaturated white", and Gray instead of "desaturated black".

According to the values specified on the computer's technical manual (“Manuel Technique du MO5”, p. 11-19), the hardware palette was:

Thomson MO5 Hardware Palette
| Memory bits PBGR | PROM bit mask B2B1 G2G1 R2R1 | Name | Memory bits PBGR | PROM bit mask B2B1 G2G1 R2R1 | Name |
|---|---|---|---|---|---|
| 0000 | 00 00 00 | Black | 1000 | 10 10 10 | Gray |
| 0001 | 01 01 11 | Red | 1001 | 10 10 11 | Rose |
| 0010 | 00 11 00 | Green | 1010 | 10 11 10 | Light Green |
| 0011 | 00 11 11 | Yellow | 1011 | 10 11 11 | Light Yellow |
| 0100 | 11 01 01 | Blue | 1100 | 11 10 01 | Light Blue |
| 0101 | 11 00 11 | Magenta | 1101 | 11 10 11 | Parma Pink |
| 0110 | 11 11 01 | Cyan | 1110 | 11 11 10 | Light Cyan |
| 0111 | 11 11 11 | White | 1111 | 01 10 11 | Orange |

Displayed colours are only approximate due to different transfer and colour spaces used on web pages (sRGB) and analog video (BT.601)

Video RAM was 16 KB. As common on home computers designed to be connected to an ordinary TV screen, the 320 × 200 pixels active area doesn't cover the entire screen, and is surrounded by a border. The video output is RGB on a SCART connector, with the refresh rate being 625-line compatible 50 Hz.

Audio is limited to 1-bit square wave tones, outputted via the TV using the SCART connector. The machine used cassette tapes for file storage, played on a proprietary player connected using a 5-pin DIN connector. The tape player's output is also routed to the computer's sound output. The keyboard has 58 keys and includes a reset button.

== Expansion ==
A cartridge port was available. A RAM expansion adding extra 64 KB and a "Nanoréseau" network card could be plugged into it, but was incompatible with early MO5 machines.

== Software ==
Around two hundred software titles are known to exist for the MO5.

== Variants ==
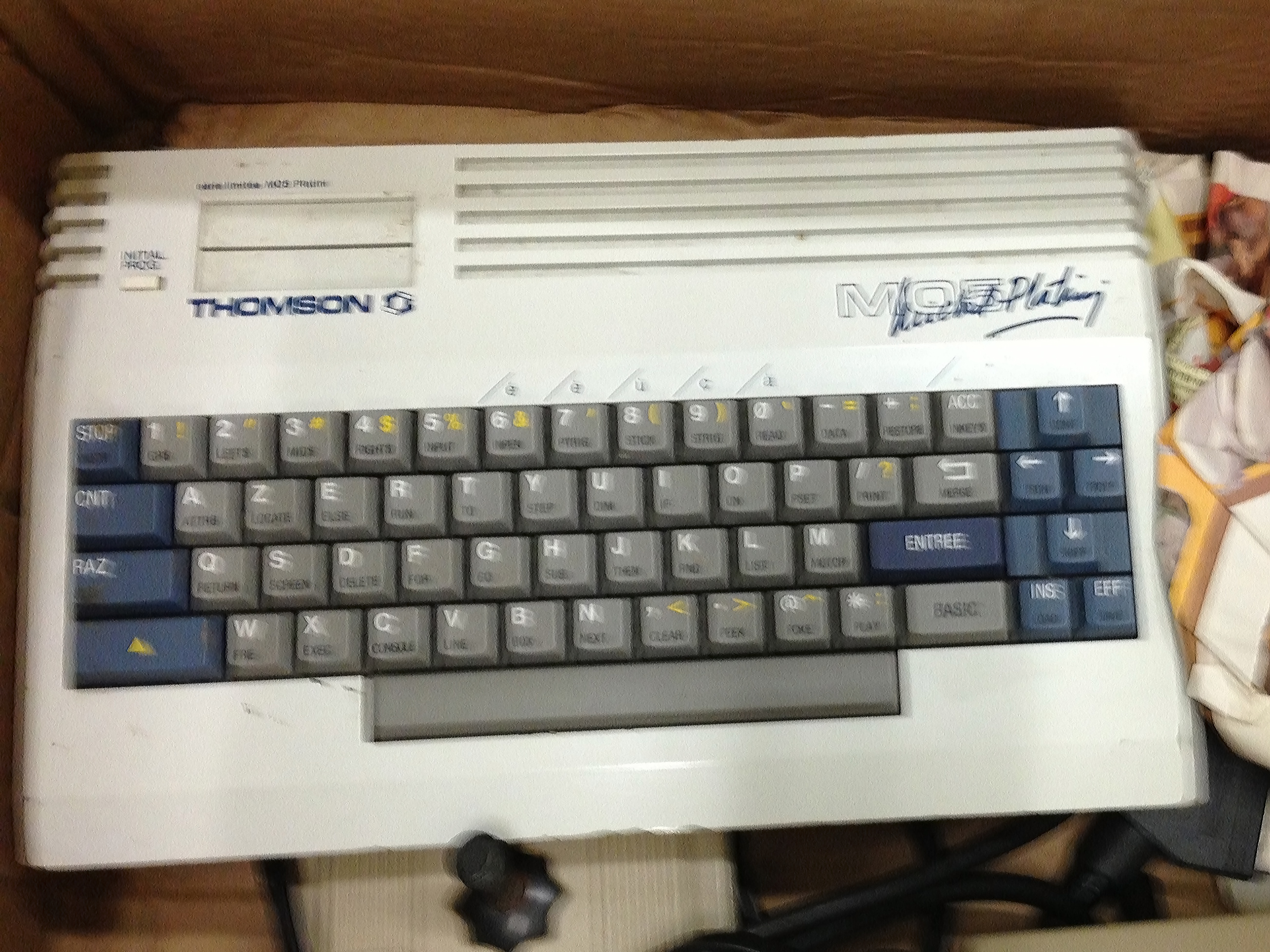
Thomson MO5 Platini

=== MO5 Michel Platini ===
The MO5 was sold in a version featuring a mechanical keyboard and a white casing, in a limited edition named MO5 Michel Platini.

=== Thomson MO5E ===
An improved version, named Thomson MO5E ("E" for "Export", a model designed for foreign markets) was presented in 1985. It had a different casing featuring a mechanical keyboard, a parallel port, two joystick ports, an internal PAL modulator and an integrated power supply. Sound was also improved, with four voices and seven octaves.

=== Thomson MO5NR ===
The Thomson MO5NR ("NR" for "Nanoréseau", a network standard – see Computing for All) was introduced in 1986 and added a 58-key AZERTY keyboard and an integrated "Nanoréseau" network controller. Memory was expanded to 128 KB and the machine came with a new version of BASIC (Microsoft Basic 128 1.0).

Graphics were improved by the use of the Thomson EF9369 graphics chip, and the MO5NR could generate 4096 colours, and display up to 16 simultaneously depending on the resolution used:

- 160 × 200 × 5 colours with 3 transparency levels
- 160 × 200 × 16 colours
- 320 × 200 × 2 colours (allows shifting between two screen pages)
- 320 × 200 × 3 colours and 1 transparency level
- 320 × 200 × 4 colours
- 320 × 200 × 16 colours (2 colours per 8 × 1 pixels restraint)
- 640 × 200 × 2 colours

Sound was also updated to four voices and five octaves.

== See also ==
- Computing for All, a French government plan to introduce computers to the country's pupils
