= Thomson EF936x =

Graphic Display Processor (GDP) by Thomson-EFCIS

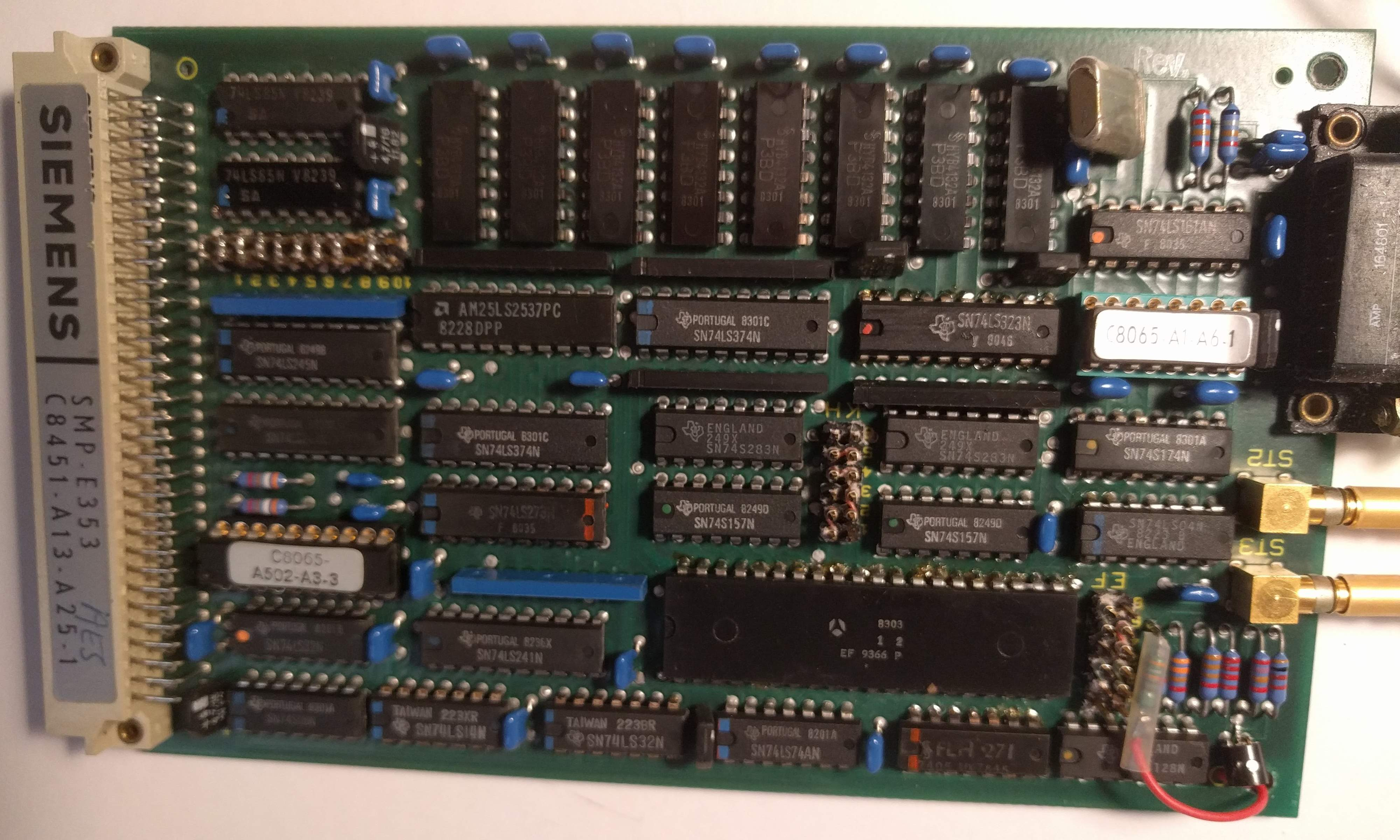
Siemens SMP-E353 ECB Bus video board using EF9366.

The Thomson EF9365-66 is a type of Graphic Display Processor (GDP) by Thomson-EFCIS. It was designed (1976-1978) by Philippe Matherat, then a student at the École normale supérieure in Paris. The chip could draw at 1 million pixels per second, which was relatively advanced for the time of its release (1980). There are various versions of the chip with slightly different capabilities.

The first version, EF9364 CRT Processor, an alphanumeric display controller, was introduced in 1977.It was designed by Jean Gastinel.

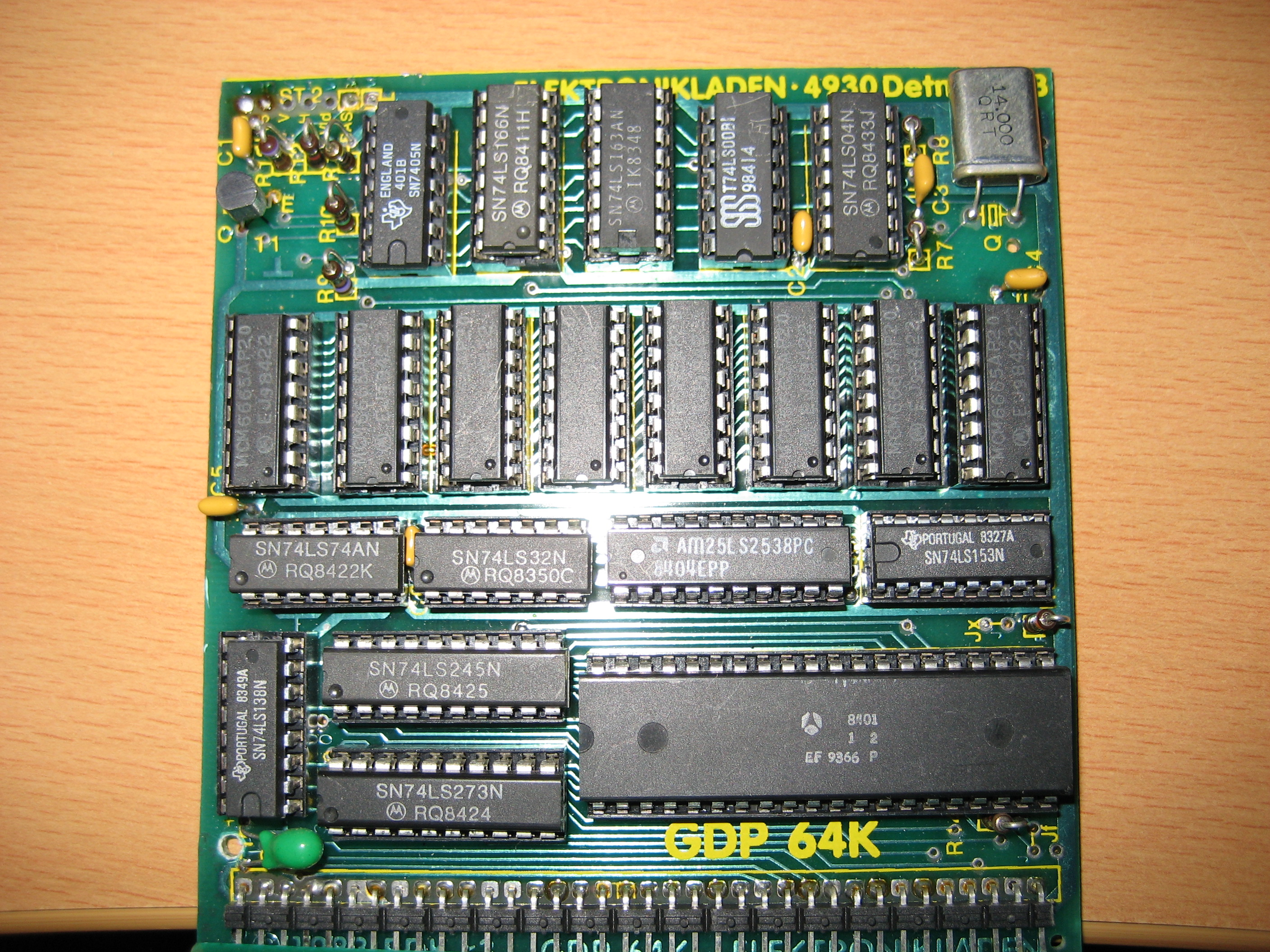
NDR-Klein-Computer graphics card using EF9366.

In 1982 Commodore released a "High Resolution Graphics" board for the PET based on the EF9365 and EF9366 chips, allowing it to display 512 × 512 or 512 × 256 resolution graphics. The EF9366 was also used on the SMP-E353 graphic card for the Siemens SICOMP computer series and on the NDR-Klein-Computer introduced in 1984.

Version EF9369, introduced in 1984, was used on computers such as the Thomson MO5NR, MO6, TO8, TO9 and TO9+, and from 1985 to 1989 on the DAI Personal Computer.

== Versions ==
Based on the 1989 data book published by the company, the EF936x series was split into Graphics Controllers and Color Palette models:

=== Graphics Controllers ===
- EF9364 CRT Processor introduced in 1977
- EF9365 512 × 512 (interlaced), 256 × 256, 128 × 128, 64 × 64; 50 Hz
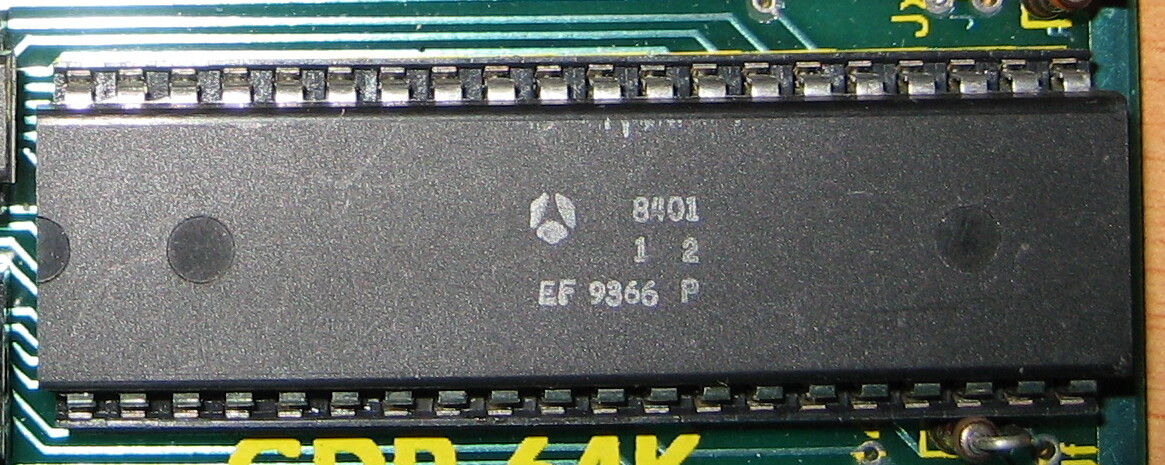
- EF9666 on the NDR-Klein-Computer
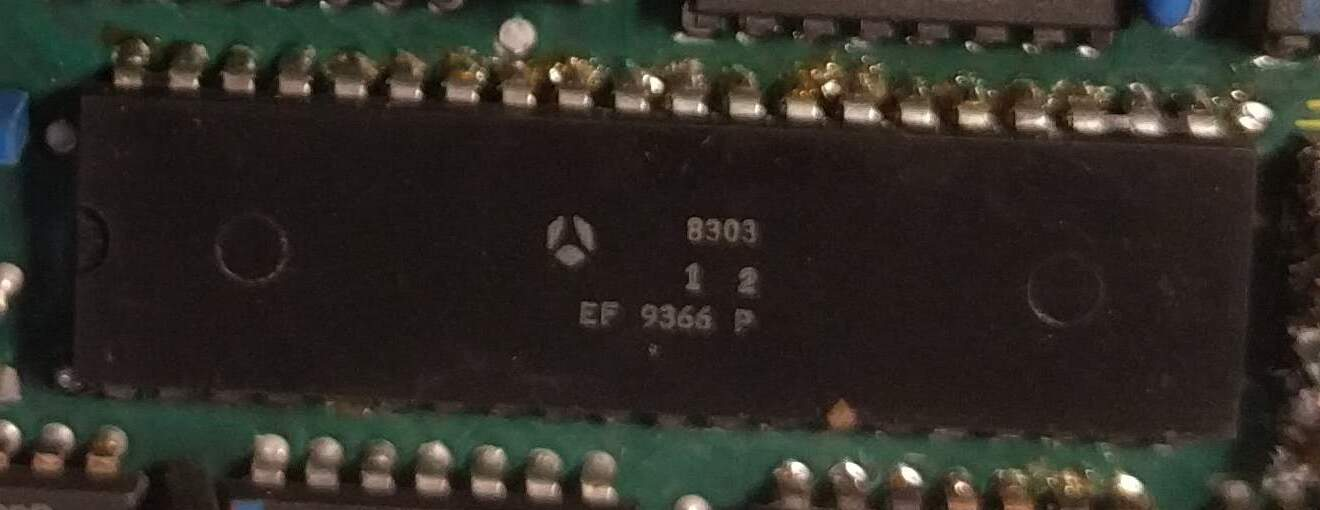
  EF9366 on the SMP-E353 graphic card
  EF9366 512 × 256 (non-interlaced); 50/60 Hz
- EF9367 1024 × 512 (interlaced), 1024 × 416 (interlaced); 50/60 Hz (capable of SECAM system output for the French market).
- SFF96364 is the first name of EF9364.

=== Color Palette ===
- EF9369 - 4-bit DACs (16 out of 4096 colors - 12-bit RGB), generating gamma corrected (gamma 2.8) voltages.
- TS9370 - 4-bit DACs (16 out of 4096 colors)

== Capabilities ==
- Integrated DRAM controller
- Line drawing, with delta-x and delta-y limited to 255 each. Support for solid, dotted, dashed and dotted/dashed lines.
- Built-in 5 × 8 pixel ASCII font. Support for rendering tilted characters, and scaling by integer factors (no antialiasing)
- Clear screen
- Light Pen support

The GPUs did not support direct access to the graphics memory, although a special command was provided to aid in implementing access to individual memory words.

== Character Set ==
The Thomson EF9365/6 used the following character, displayed with a 5 × 8 pixel font:

EF9365/6 Character Set
	2x	3x	4x	5x	6x	7x
0	SP	0	@	P	‘	p
1	!	1	A	Q	a	q
2	"	2	B	R	b	r
3	#	3	C	S	c	s
4	$	4	D	T	d	t
5	%	5	E	U	e	u
6	&	6	F	V	f	v
7	’	7	G	W	g	w
8	(	8	H	X	h	x
9	)	9	I	Y	i	y
A	*	:	J	Z	j	z
B	+	;	K	[	k	{
C	,	<	L	\	l	|
D	-	=	M	]	m	}
E	.	>	N	↑	n	¬
F	/	?	O	←	o	▒

== See also ==
- Thomson EF934x
- Thomson MO5NR
- Thomson MO6
- Thomson TO8
- Thomson TO9
- Thomson TO9+
- NDR-Klein-Computer
- Commodore PET
- DAI Personal Computer
- List of home computers by video hardware
