= Thomson TO9 =

1985 French computer model

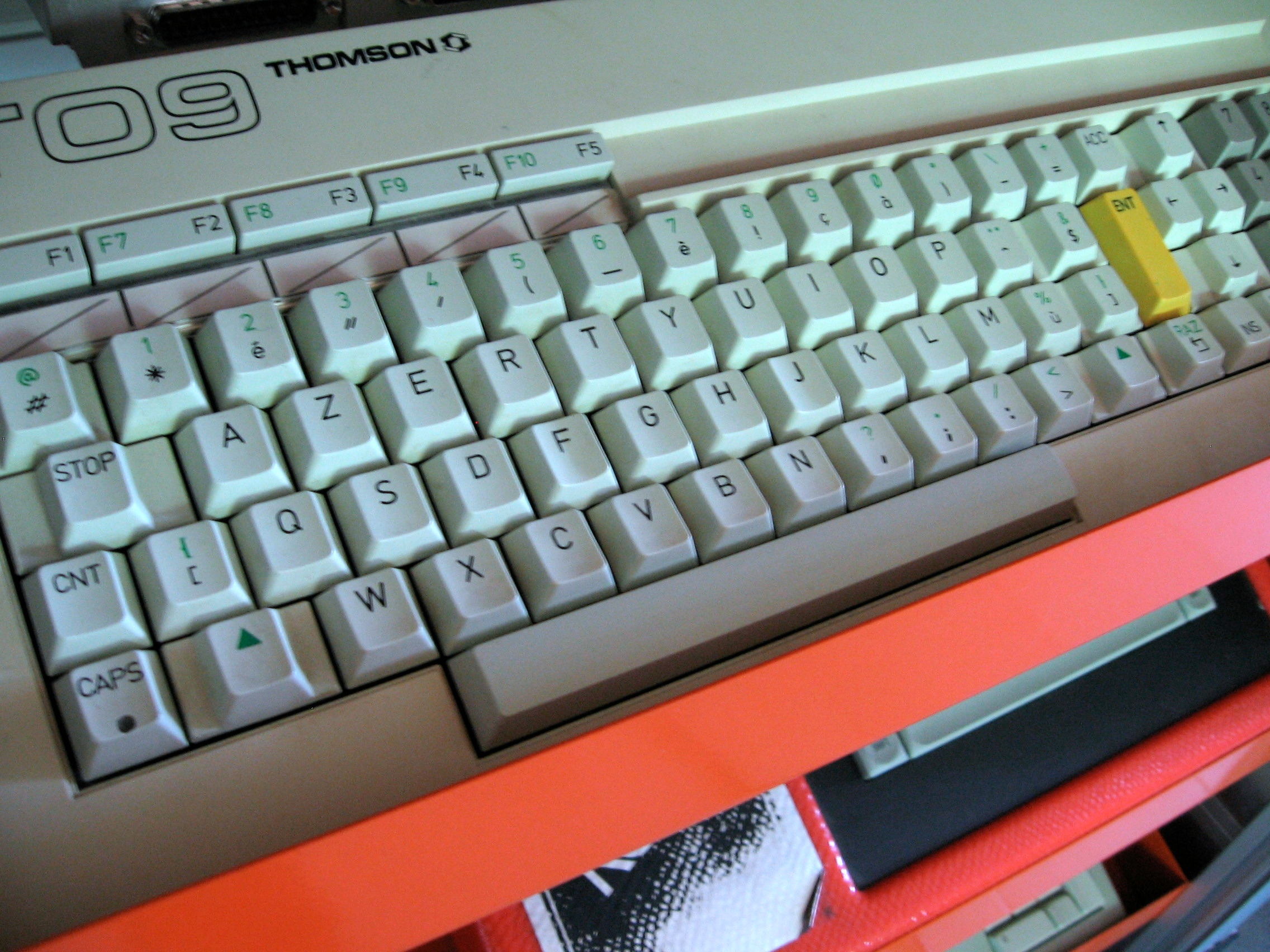
- Thomson TO9
- Manufacturer: Thomson SA
- Released: 1985; 41 years ago
- Introductory price: 9,000 FF
- Discontinued: 1986; 40 years ago
- Operating system: Basic 1.0, BASIC 128
- CPU: Motorola 6809E, 1 MHz
- Memory: 128 KB RAM; 136 KB ROM
- Graphics: Thomson EF9369, 320 × 200
- Sound: 3 channels, 7 octaves
- Predecessor: Thomson TO7/70
- Successor: Thomson TO9+

The Thomson TO9 is a home computer introduced by French company Thomson SA in 1985.

It's based on the Thomson TO7/70 with new features. It included a built-in 320 kB 3.5-inch floppy drive unit, and inputs for light pen, joystick, and mouse. The ROM included some utilities like: two BASIC versions (BASIC 1.0 and BASIC 128), a word processor (Paragraphe) and a database program (Fiche & Dossiers).

The machine was compatible with the previous TO7 and TO7/70 models.

Introduced in October 1985, the Thomson TO9 was quickly replaced with the Thomson TO9+ that came out in 1986. Ten games were released for the TO9.
