= Thomson TO8 =

1986 French computer model

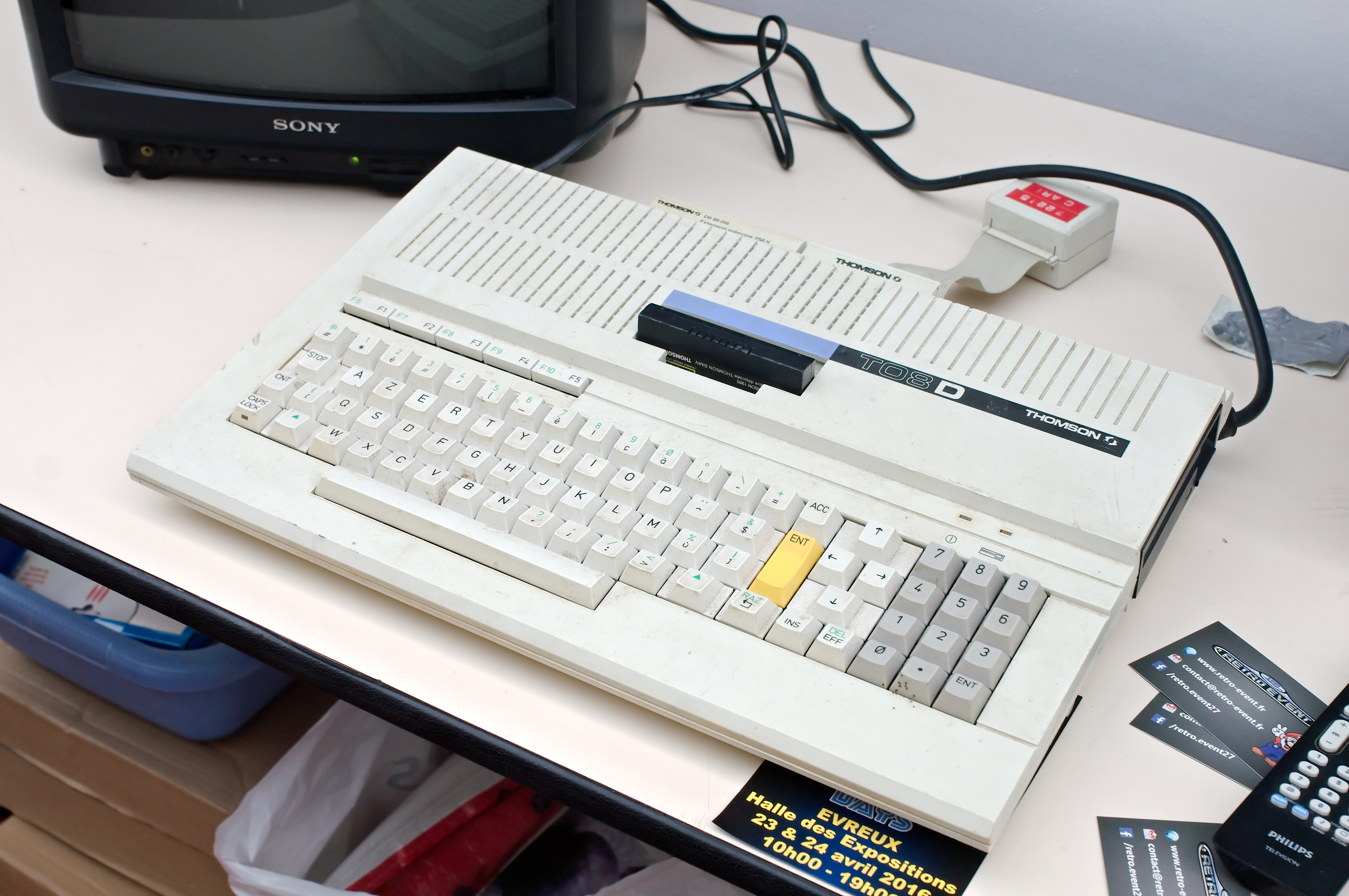
- Manufacturer: Thomson SA
- Released: 1986; 40 years ago
- Introductory price: 2,990 FF
- Discontinued: 1989; 37 years ago
- Operating system: Basic 512, Basic 1.0 and Disk Basic
- CPU: Motorola 6809E, 1 MHz
- Memory: 256 KB (512 KB max.) RAM; 80 KB ROM
- Storage: Disk drive, tape (optional)
- Display: 160 × 200 (16 or 5 colours); 320 × 200 (2, 3, 4 or 16 colours); 640 × 200 (2 colours)
- Graphics: Thomson EF9369
- Sound: generator + 1 bit D/A converter 6 bits
- Input: 81-key AZERTY keyboard, light pen
- Controller input: joystick, mouse
- Backward compatibility: Thomson TO7/70
- Predecessor: Thomson TO7/70
- Successor: Thomson TO9+

The Thomson TO8 is a home computer introduced by French company Thomson SA in 1986, with a cost of 2,990 FF. It replaces its predecessor, the Thomson TO7/70, while remaining essentially compatible.

The new features of the TO8, like larger memory (256 KB) and better graphics modes (powered by the Thomson EF9369 graphics chip), are shared with the other second generation Thomson computers (MO6 and TO9+).

The TO8 has a tape drive and Microsoft BASIC 1.0 (in standard and 512 KB versions) on its internal ROM, and there is an optional external floppy drive. Graphics were provided by the Thomson EF9369 chip, allowing the display of 16 colours from a palette of 4096.

More than 120 games exist for the system.

An improved version, the Thomson TO8D, includes a built-in 3.5-inch floppy drive.
