= Thomson MO6 =

1986 French computer model

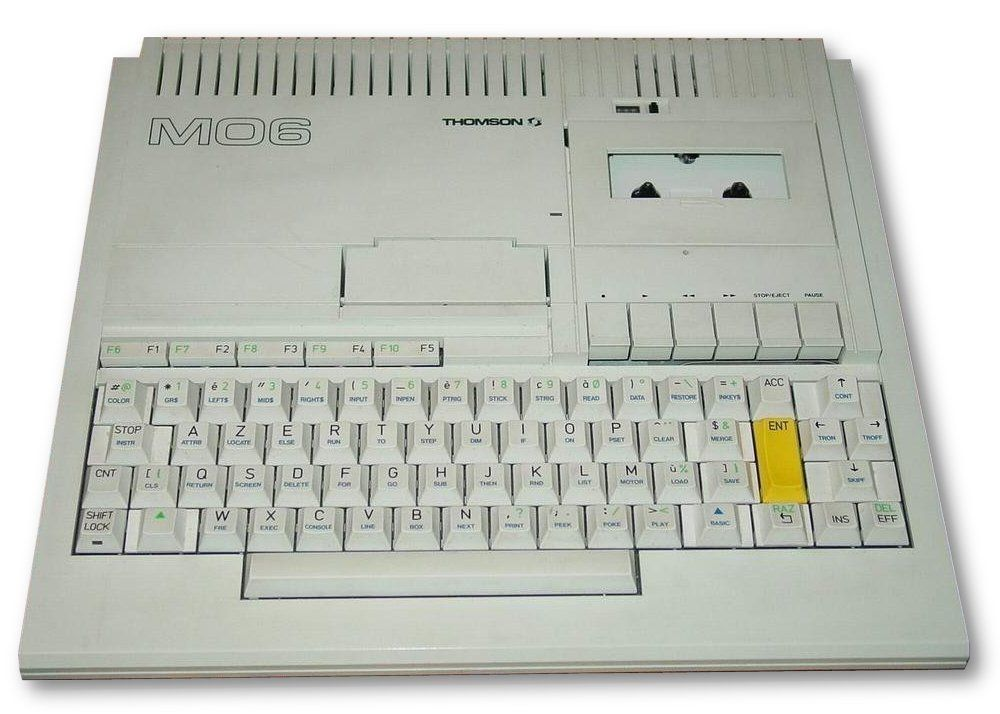
- Thomson MO6
- Also known as: Olivetti Prodest PC128
- Manufacturer: Thomson SA
- Released: 1986; 40 years ago
- Discontinued: 1989; 37 years ago
- Media: Audio cassette
- Operating system: BASIC 128 and Basic 1.0
- CPU: Motorola 6809E @ 1 MHz
- Memory: 64 KB ROM, 128 KB RAM
- Storage: Audio cassette (1200/2400 bauds), disk drive (optional)
- Display: 8 modes from 160 × 200 to 640 × 200 with 2 to 16 colours (from 4096)
- Graphics: Thomson EF9369
- Sound: 4 channels, 7 octaves
- Input: 69-key mechanical AZERTY keyboard, light pen
- Controller input: Joystick, mouse
- Power: 200 V, 24 W
- Dimensions: 362 × 87 × 315 mm
- Weight: 3 kg
- Backward compatibility: Thomson MO5
- Predecessor: Thomson MO5

The Thomson MO6 was a Motorola 6809E-based computer introduced in France in 1986. It was intended as the successor to the Thomson MO5 and featured 128 KB of RAM, a 40 × 25 text display, and a new built-in Microsoft BASIC interpreter (BASIC 128). It retained compatibility with its predecessor, while incorporating the same technology as the TO8.

Graphic abilities were expanded compared to the MO5, by the use of the Thomson EF9369 graphics chip. The 16 colour palette could be defined from a total of 4096 colours and extra video modes were available:

- 160 × 200 × 5 colours with 3 transparency levels
- 160 × 200 × 16 colours
- 320 × 200 × 2 colours (allows shifting between two screen pages)
- 320 × 200 × 3 colours and one transparency level
- 320 × 200 × 4 colours
- 320 × 200 × 16 colours (2 colours per 8 × 1 pixels restraint)
- 640 × 200 × 2 colours

In Italy it was sold by Olivetti with minor aesthetic changes, and named Olivetti Prodest PC128. Twenty-one games were released for the MO6. The machine was available until January 1989.
