= Volkswagen Beetle =

Small family car (1938–2003)

Volkswagen Type 1; "Beetle"
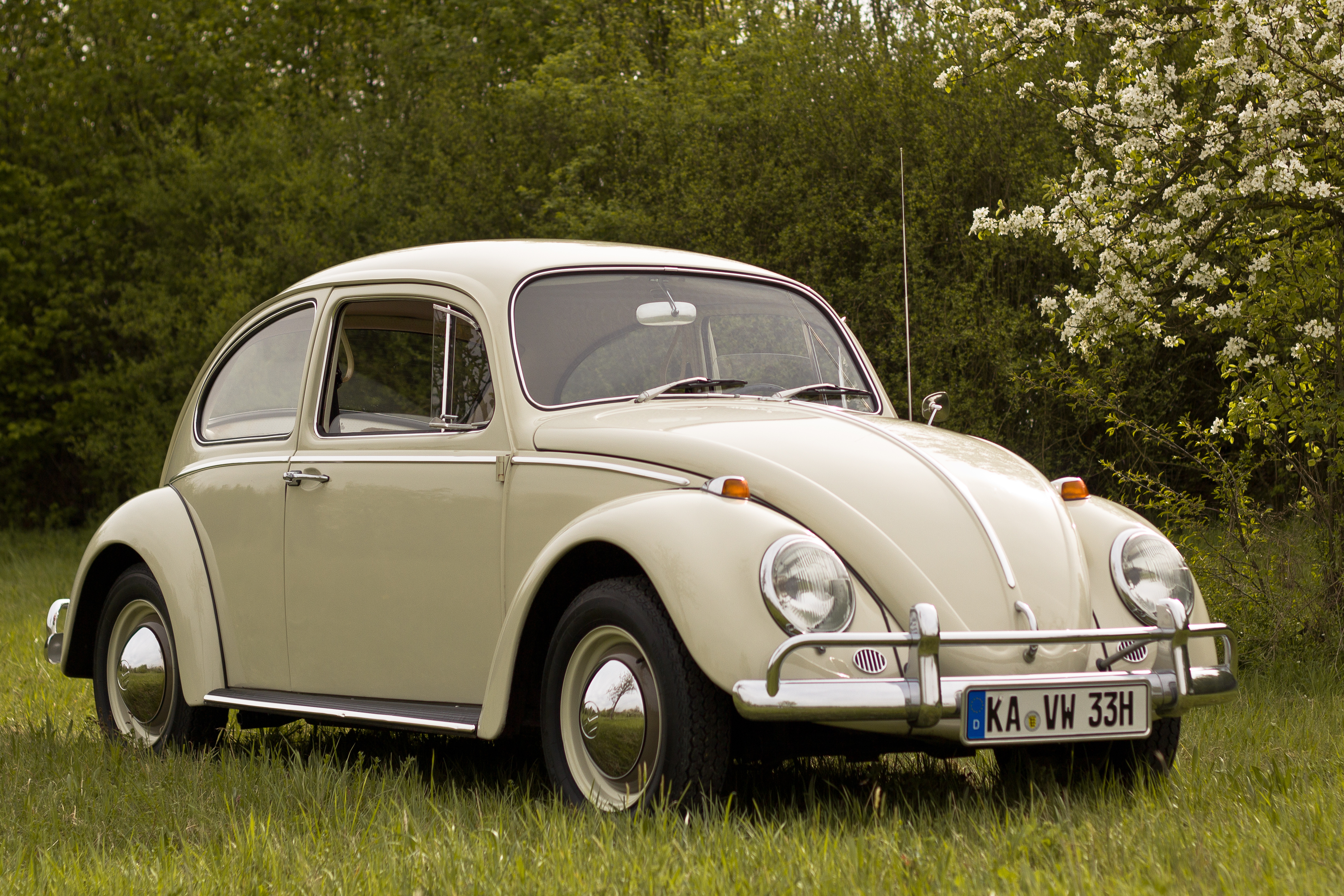
- 1965–1966 Volkswagen Käfer

Overview
- Manufacturer: Volkswagen
- Also called: Full list
- Production: 1938–2003; 21,529,464 produced
- Assembly: Full list
- Designer: Ferdinand Porsche

Body and chassis
- Class: Small family car
- Body style: 2-door saloon; 2-door convertible
- Layout: Rear-engine, rear-wheel-drive
- Related: Volkswagen Type 2; Volkswagen Type 3

Powertrain
- Engine: Petrol: 995 cc H4 (first 1938 models); 1132 cc H4; 1192 cc H4; 1285 cc H4; 1493 cc H4; 1584 cc H4
- Transmission: 4-speed manual transaxle; 4-speed Saxomat semi-automatic; 3-speed Autostick semi-automatic

Dimensions
- Wheelbase: 2,400–2,420 mm (94.5–95.3 in)
- Length: 4,079–4,140 mm (160.6–163.0 in)
- Width: 1,539–1,585 mm (60.6–62.4 in)
- Height: 1,500 mm (59.1 in)
- Kerb weight: 730–930 kg (1,610–2,050 lb)

Chronology
- Successor: Volkswagen Golf Mk1; Volkswagen Gol (G1); Volkswagen New Beetle

The Volkswagen Beetle, officially the Volkswagen Type 1, (Note: It is known informally in German as der Käfer (meaning "beetle"), in parts of the English-speaking world as the Bug, and by many other nicknames in other languages.) is a small family car produced by the German company Volkswagen from 1938 to 2003. (Note: While the first units were produced in 1938, series production did not commence until 1945.) A global cultural icon known for its bug-like design, the Beetle is widely regarded as one of the most influential cars of the 20th century. Its production period of 65 years is the longest for any single generation of automobile. (Note: It is the longest-running automobile without significant changes in design; the Chevrolet Suburban is the longest-running nameplate.) With 21.5 million units produced over twenty locations worldwide, the Beetle is the best-selling car of a single platform in history and the second best-selling car nameplate of the 20th century.

The Beetle was conceived in the early 1930s, when the leader of Nazi Germany, Adolf Hitler, decided there was a need for a people's car—an inexpensive, simple, mass-produced car—to serve Germany's new road network, the Reichsautobahn. Engineer Ferdinand Porsche and his design team began developing and designing the car in the early 1930s, but the fundamental design concept can be attributed to Béla Barényi in 1925, predating Porsche's (Note: When referring to the surname "Porsche" of Ferdinand Porsche, it should not be mistaken for the automotive brand he established. The correct term for the company is Porsche AG, or "Porsche" followed by the specific model name (e.g., Porsche Cayenne).) claims by almost ten years. The result was the Volkswagen Type 1 and the introduction of the Volkswagen brand. Volkswagen initially slated production for the late 1930s, but the outbreak of World War II in 1939 delayed production until the war ended in 1945. The car was originally called the Volkswagen Type 1 and marketed simply as the Volkswagen; it was not until 1968 that it was officially named the "Beetle".

Volkswagen implemented designations for the Beetle in the 1960s, including 1200, 1300, 1500, 1600, 1302, and 1303. The company introduced a series of large luxury models throughout the 1960s and 1970s—comprising the Type 3, Type 4 and K70—to supplement the Beetle, but none of these models achieved the level of success that the Beetle did. In 1972, the Beetle surpassed the Ford Model T to become the best-selling car of all time, a record it held for 25 years. Rapidly changing consumer preferences toward front-wheel drive compact hatchbacks in Europe prompted Volkswagen's gradual shift away from rear-wheel drive, starting with the Golf in 1974. In the late 1970s and 1980s, Japanese automakers began to dominate markets around the world, which contributed to the Beetle's declining popularity.

The Beetle remains one of the best-selling cars of all time, and is the first to have over 20 million units produced. Over its lifespan, its design remained consistent, yet Volkswagen implemented over 78,000 updates. These modifications were mostly subtle, involving minor alterations to its exterior, interior, colours, and lighting. Some more noteworthy changes included the introduction of new engines, models and systems, such as improved technology or comfort. The Beetle maintains a substantial cultural influence, and is regarded as one of the most iconic vehicles in automotive history. Its success largely influenced the way automobiles are designed and marketed, and propelled Volkswagen's introduction of a Golf-based series of vehicles.

== History ==
=== KdF-Wagen ===
In May 1934, during a meeting at Berlin's Kaiserhof Hotel, the dictator of Nazi Germany, Adolf Hitler, insisted on the development of a vehicle that could accommodate two adults and three children while not using more than seven litres of fuel per 100 km (33.6 mpg US/40.4 mpg UK). All components were designed for a quick and inexpensive part exchange. As Hitler explained, the reason for choosing an air-cooled engine was the lack of a garage for every country doctor. On 22 June 1934, Ferdinand Porsche received a development contract from the Verband der Automobilindustrie (German Association of the Automotive Industry) for the prototype of an inexpensive and economical passenger car after Hitler decided there was a need for a people's car (in German, "volkswagen")—a car affordable and practical enough for lower-class people to own—to serve the country's new road network, the Reichsautobahn. Although the Volkswagen car was primarily the conception of Porsche and Hitler, the idea of a "people's car" is much older than Nazism, and has existed since the introduction of automotive mass production.

Originally designated as the Type 60 by Porsche, the Beetle project involved a team of designers and engineers, comprising Erwin Komenda, who specialised in the bodywork; Josef Kales, responsible for the engine design; Karl Rabe, serving as the chief engineer; and Josef Mickl and Franz Xaver Reimspiess, the latter credited for devising the iconic Volkswagen badge. The project saw significant milestones in October 1935, with the completion of the first two Type-60 prototypes, identified as cars V1 (sedan) and V2 (convertible), denoted with a "V" (for Versuchs – "prototype"), signifying their status as a test car. The testing of three additional V3 prototypes began on 11 July 1936, the first of which was driven to Obersalzberg and inspected by Hitler. Two V3s were delivered to Berlin in August for examination by other Nazi Party officials, who showed great interest in them. By June 1936, the V3s had undergone more than 50,000 km (31,000 mi) of testing across various types of terrain. A series of thirty W30 development models, commissioned by Porsche and manufactured by Daimler-Benz, underwent testing in early April 1937, covering a total distance of over 2,900,000 kilometres (1,800,000 mi). All vehicles featured the characteristic rounded design and included air-cooled, rear-mounted engines. A further batch of 44 VW38 pre-production cars produced in 1938 introduced split rear windows, and subsequently, Volkswagen introduced fifty VW39 cars, completed in July 1939.

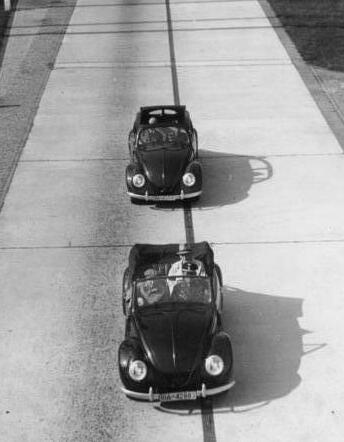
Two KdF cars on the Reichsautobahn, c. 1943. Since the KdF was never delivered to the public, it is likely that this was an advertisement photo.

Kraft durch Freude (Strength Through Joy, a political organisation aimed at providing the populace with leisure activities) was in charge of this project. Robert Ley, the official heading Kraft durch Freude (KdF), announced in 1938 that every German would own a Volkswagen within ten years. However, there were challenges. Gasoline prices in Germany were high due to taxes, making it expensive for private car ownership. Gasoline was also primarily used for the military in the Nazi regime. Despite that, the regime saw the mass-produced car as a way to promote their system. It symbolised a shift from cars being a privilege for the wealthy to a dream that lower-class Germans could now fulfil. Hitler was particularly enthusiastic about it because the car could easily be adapted for military use.

The KdF-Wagen was not series-produced before World War II because the Volkswagen plant at Fallersleben (now Wolfsburg), founded in May 1938, was not yet completed. During the war, other German manufacturers were concurrently producing military vehicles and armaments, so the series production of the Volkswagen car could not begin until peacetime; nevertheless, 210 KdF-Wagens were manufactured by the end of the war in May 1945. Following the cessation of hostilities, the British occupying forces brought the factory into operation. By the end of 1945, 1,785 Volkswagens had been built, delivered to the occupying powers and the postal service.

=== Design ===
The Beetle features a rear-located, air-cooled four-cylinder, boxer engine and rear-wheel drive in a two-door bodywork, giving it a drag coefficient of Cd=0.48. It features a flat front windscreen and accommodates four passengers, with luggage storage under the front bonnet and behind the rear seat. The bodywork, attached with eighteen bolts to the Beetle's nearly flat platform chassis, features a central structural tunnel. The front and rear suspension incorporates torsion bars and a front stabiliser bar, providing independent suspension at all wheels; however, the front axle was designed with double longitudinal trailing arms, whereas the rear axle is a swing axle. Light alloy forms the Beetle's engine, transmission, and cylinder heads.

=== Design controversies ===
German-Bohemian engineer Ferdinand Porsche and his team were generally known as the original designers of the Volkswagen. However, there has been debate over whether he was the original designer. Rumours circulated suggesting that other designers, such as Béla Barényi, Paul Jaray, Josef Ganz and Hans Ledwinka, may have influenced its design.

Béla Barényi

In 1925, Austro-Hungarian automotive engineer Béla Barényi designed a car shaped similarly to the Beetle, more than five years before Porsche unveiled his initial "People's Car" design. Through a court ruling in 1953, Barényi successfully asserted his authorship and associated claims. He explained that he had previously elucidated the concept of the Beetle, which was already formulated in the 1920s, to Porsche in great detail. However, this concept was not protected sufficiently by patents. Key elements of this concept included the air-cooled four-cylinder boxer engine at the rear, the transmission positioned in front of the rear axle, and the distinctive roundish shape. Dieter Landenberger, the head of Porsche's historical archive, later affirmed that Barényi played a "decisive role in the authorship of the later VW Beetle". Since then, Barényi has been known for conceiving the original car design.

Paul Jaray

Many assume that Paul Jaray shaped the car's body design through his aerodynamics calculations. According to a November 2021 update of research mentioned in the fifteenth report by the German newspaper Frankfurter Allgemeine Zeitung, Jaray's findings influenced the design of "Hitler's streamlined KdF car", later known as the Beetle, which became the best-selling car globally after World War II. Jaray's research results in fluid mechanics for ground-bound vehicles extended beyond the Beetle, impacting the Tatra 77 and other vehicles. His initial patents and publications date back to the early 1920s. Engineer Christian Binnebesel scientifically presented Jaray's significant contribution to streamline form in his 2008 dissertation.

Josef Ganz

Josef Ganz's potential early contributions to the original Beetle's development remained controversial for years and lacked clear clarification. Research suggests that his idea and the concept of a compact car played a significant role in the Beetle's development and its prototypes. Ganz personally drove a Hanomag Kommissbrot and a swing-axle Tatra, both of which featured elements such as a central tubular frame, independent wheel suspension, and a rear/mid-engine design. Ganz incorporated these technical features into his proposed vehicle designs. Hitler reportedly saw cars designed by Ganz at the 1933 Berlin Auto Show. The Standard Superior, designed by Ganz for the Standard vehicle factory, featured an implied teardrop-shaped body on a central tubular frame with a rear swing axle, yet the engine was transversely installed in front of the axle, not longitudinally as a rear engine.

Hans Ledwinka

Austrian automobile designer Hans Ledwinka, a contemporary of Porsche, worked for Czechoslovak company Tatra. In 1931, Tatra built the V570 prototype, which featured an air-cooled flat-twin engine mounted at the rear. Hitler and Porsche both were influenced by the Tatras. Hitler, an avid automotive enthusiast, rode in Tatras multiple times during political tours of Czechoslovakia and had frequent dinners with Ledwinka. Following one such tour, Hitler remarked to Porsche, "This is the car for my roads." From 1933 onwards, Ledwinka and Porsche met regularly to discuss their designs, and Porsche admitted, "Well, sometimes I looked over his shoulder, and sometimes he looked over mine" while designing the Volkswagen. The 1936 Tatra 97 had a 1,749 cc, rear-located, rear-wheel drive, air-cooled four-cylinder boxer engine. It accommodated five passengers in its compact four-door body, which provided luggage storage under the front bonnet and behind the rear seats.

Just before the outbreak of World War II, Tatra filed numerous legal claims against VW for patent infringement. Tatra launched a lawsuit that was halted only by Germany's invasion of Czechoslovakia in 1938, leading to the Nazi administration of the Tatra factory in October. Hitler instructed Tatra to focus exclusively on heavy trucks and diesel engines, discontinuing all car models except the V8-engined Tatra 87. The issue resurfaced after World War II, and in 1965, Volkswagen paid Ringhoffer-Tatra one million Deutsche Marks in an out-of-court settlement.

== Tenure ==
=== World War II and military production: 1938–1945 ===
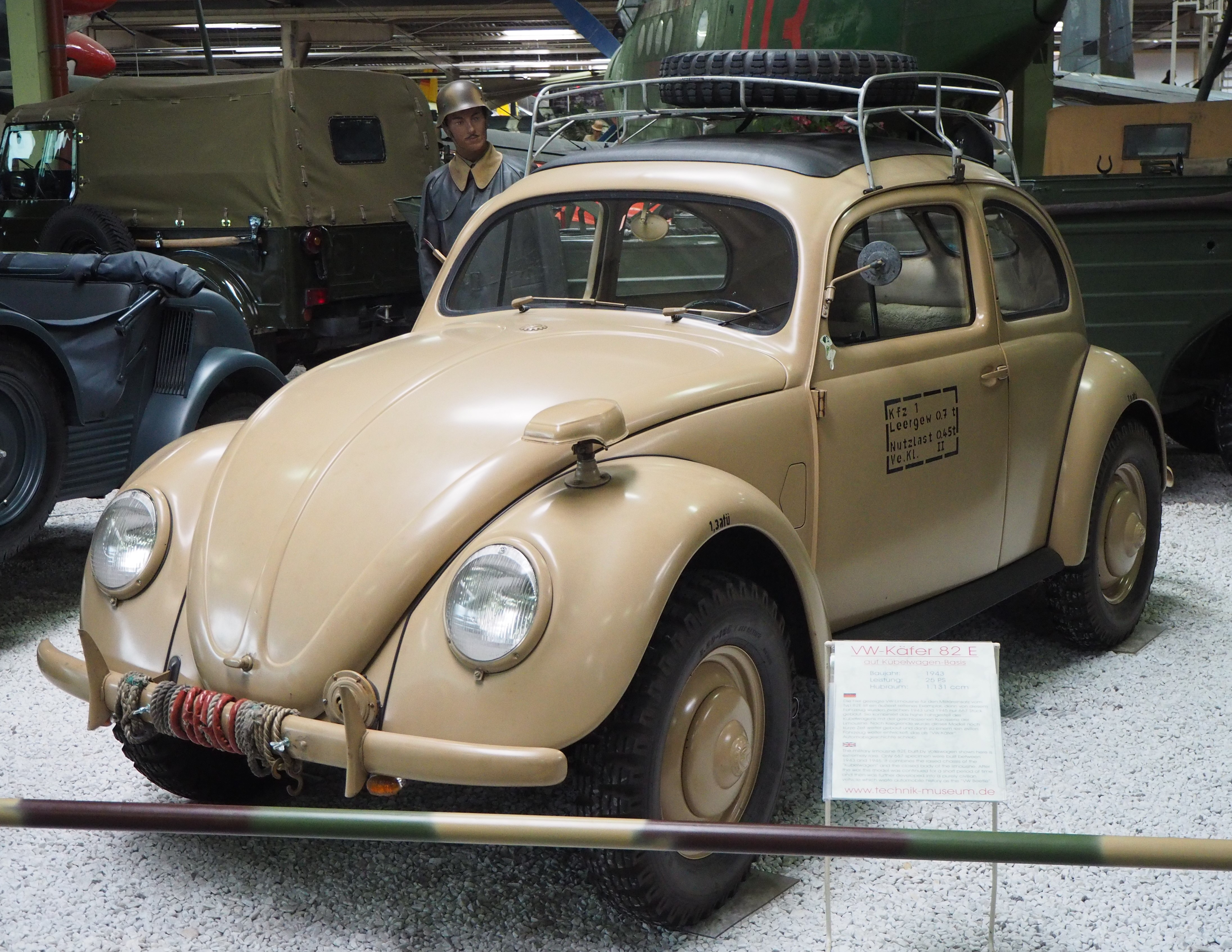
Sand-coloured VW Type 82E — a Wehrmacht Beetle on the Kübelwagen's underpinnings.

The name Volkswagen was officially substituted by the term KdF (Kraft durch Freude, German for "Strength Through Joy") once Hitler ceremoniously laid the foundation stone for the Volkswagen factory on 26 May 1938. As part of this organisation, Volkswagen urged workers to "save five marks a week and get your car". Before the completion of the KdF factory, many Germans had already signed up for a savings plan to buy a car. At that time, Germany had fewer cars than other European countries. In 1930, there were only about 500,000 registered cars in Germany, while France and Great Britain had more than a million each, and the United States had more than 26 million. However, the onset of World War II hindered the distribution of the cars, and there was a lack of time for series production. With the Volkswagen facility dedicated solely to wartime requirements, more than 330,000 KdF savers could not acquire their vehicles. Following the war, numerous KdF savers pressed for the receipt of a Volkswagen. When their request was denied, the VW saver initiative ensued, spanning several years.

During the war, the factory predominantly built the Kübelwagen (Type 82), the Schwimmwagen (Type 166) and numerous other light utility vehicles. These vehicles were derived mechanically from the Type 1 and used by the Wehrmacht. These vehicles, including several hundred Kommandeurswagen (Type 87), featured a Type 1 Beetle body mounted on the robust chassis of the four-wheel-drive Type 86 Kübelwagen prototype. The Kommandeurswagen included a portal axle, a Schwimmwagen drivetrain, wider fenders, and oversized Kronprinz all-terrain tyres, reminiscent of the later Baja Bugs. The production of the Kommandeurswagen persisted until 1944 when the production at the plant halted due to the extensive damage inflicted by the Allied air raids. Due to gasoline shortages late in the war, a few "Holzbrenner" (wood-burner) Beetles were built fueled with wood logs.

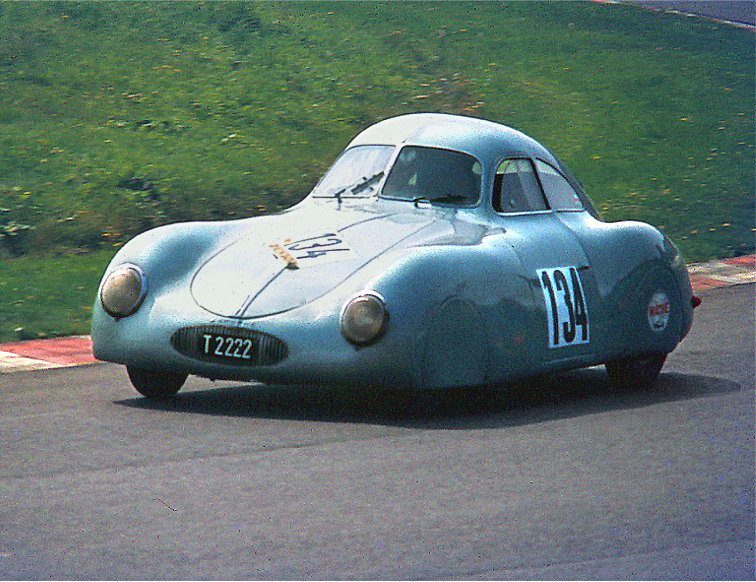
The Porsche 64 (pictured in 1981) was largely derived from the Beetle.

Kraft durch Freude arranged an event for September 1939 to showcase Germany's Autobahn highway system and to promote the purported beginning of the production of the KdF-Wagen, involving a 1,500-kilometre (930 mi) journey from Berlin to Rome. Erwin Komenda supervised the development process, while Karl Froelich was responsible for creating official plans that they subsequently used to form a wooden scale model. The model was wind tunnel tested at Stuttgart University by Josef Mickl. Dubbed the "Berlin-Rome car", Porsche AG's engineers designed the Type 60 K 10, officially known as the Porsche 64. Although the engineers produced three vehicles, they never made it to the race due to the outbreak of World War II before the scheduled date; two of them disappeared during the conflict. Austrian Otto Mathé acquired the third Berlin-Rome car and raced it throughout the 1950s, becoming the fastest in its class during the 1950 Alpine Cup. He continued to use it until his death in 1995.

=== Post-war production and success: 1945–1970 ===
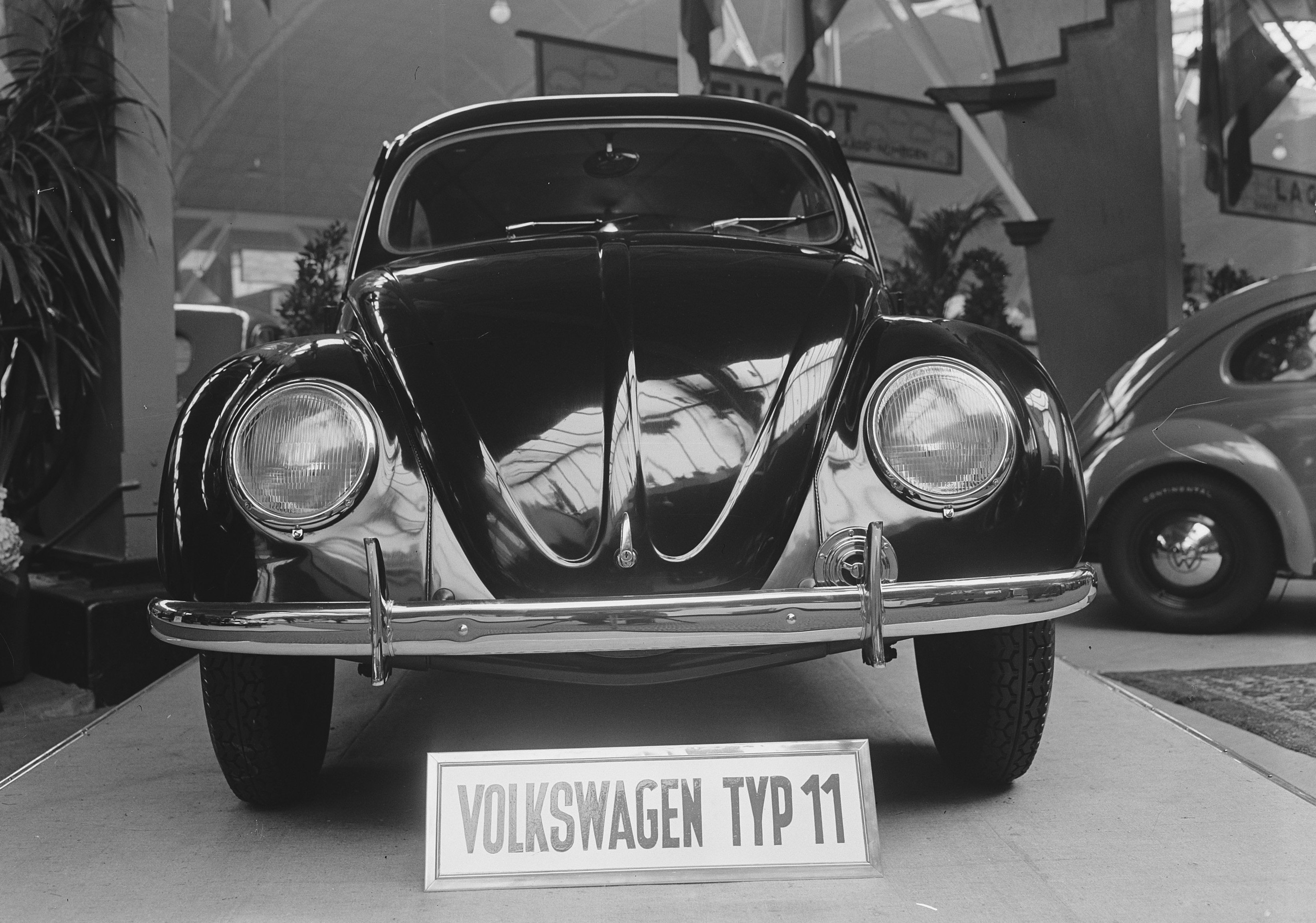
The early post-war export model at the 1948 Amsterdam AutoRAI Autoshow

The Beetle was successful once it began production following the end of the war. On 11 April 1945, Stadt des KdF-Wagens bei Fallersleben, where 17,000 people lived, was officially designated Wolfsburg. Official series manufacture of the saloon began on 27 December 1945; Volkswagen had produced 55 vehicles by the end of the year. The Volkswagen facility, initially slated for dismantling and transportation to Britain under American control in 1945, faced a lack of interest from British car manufacturers; an official report stated that "The vehicle does not meet the fundamental technical requirement of a motor-car [...] it is quite unattractive to the average buyer [...] To build the car commercially would be a completely uneconomic enterprise." Nonetheless, the factory remained operational by producing cars for the British Army. Allied dismantling policy changed from late 1946 to mid-1947. During this period, heavy industry in Germany continued until 1951. In March 1947, Herbert Hoover helped change policy by stating:

There is the illusion that the New Germany left after the annexations can be reduced to a "pastoral state". It cannot be done unless we exterminate or move 25,000,000 people out of it.

Major Ivan Hirst, a British Army officer, has been widely credited for the reopening of the Volkswagen factory. Hirst was ordered to take control of the heavily bombed factory, which the U.S. Army had captured. Recognising the scarcity of occupations in Germany and the shortage of vehicles in the British Army, Hirst persuaded the British military to order 20,000 cars, stating that it "was the limit set by the availability of materials". By March 1946, production capacity was rated at approximately 1,000 units per month. Based on an eight-hour shift in mid-1946, production was around 2,500 per month. At the time, about 1,800 machine tools were in operation, 200 of which were used exclusively for the key components.

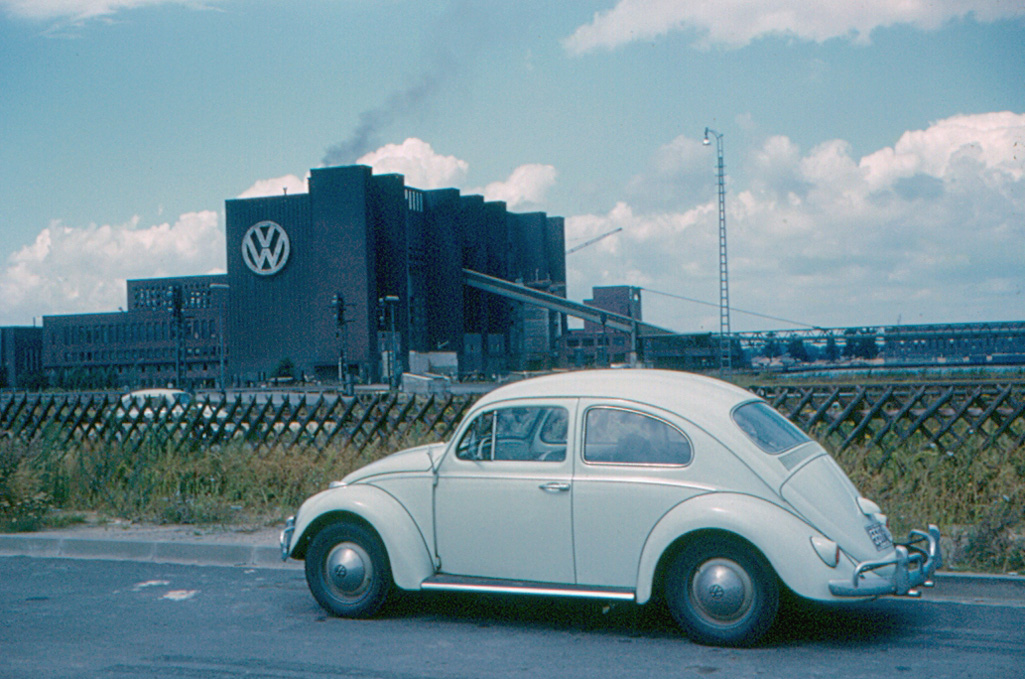
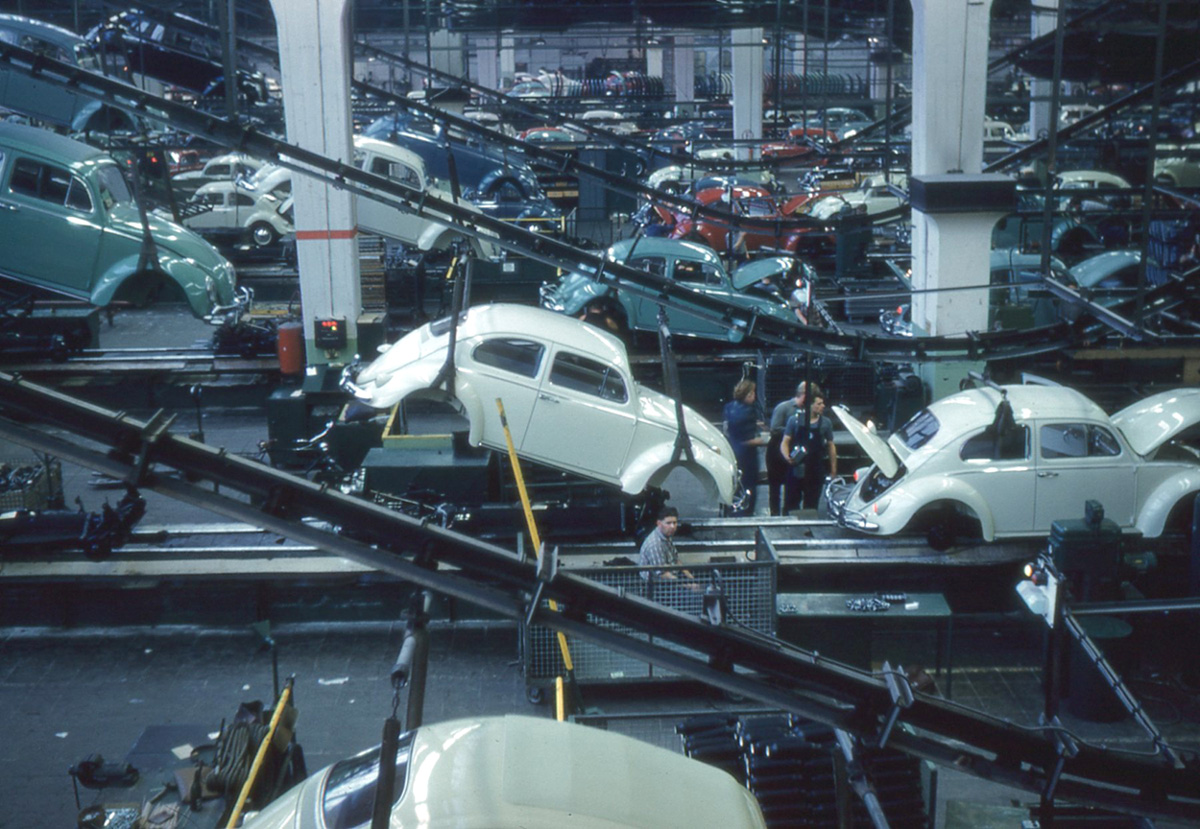
Outdoor (top) and indoor (bottom) views of the Wolfsburg assembly facility, 1960

Once Heinrich Nordhoff assumed management at Volkswagenwerk, manufacturing capacity increased significantly. Production in 1946 and 1947 was rated at 9,878 and 8,973 examples, respectively, but in Nordhoff's first year, 1948, manufacture doubled to approximately 19,244 units. On 6 August 1955, the millionth example was assembled, and production capacity was rated at 700,000 units per year by 1959. By mid-1948, the Forces of Occupation received 20,991 cars, leaving less than 10,000 for export or domestic consumption. The number of employees increased from 6,033 by the end of 1945 to almost 57,000 in 1957. After the war, over 10,000 apartments were built to house the workers in Wolfsburg, which then had a population of nearly 60,000. In 1959, Volkswagen invested more than DM500 million to increase daily production by 1,000, reaching a final target of 3,000 per day. During 1960, the company occasionally increased production by around 100; by the end of 1960, Volkswagen planned to produce 4,000 examples daily. Nordhoff stated, "Then we believe we shall have reached a balance between supply and demand so that we can finally deliver Volkswagens to customers without a waiting period".

By the early 1960s, the Wolfsburg facility accommodated about 10,000 production machines and covered 100 ha (10,800,000 sq ft) in roofed area, more than the combined residential area in Wolfsburg. Daily production increased to approximately 5,091, and the plant employed more than 43,500 workers. By 1962, Nordhoff had spent over DM675 million in expanding the factory. At that time, Volkswagen sales constituted 34.5 per cent of the total West German automotive market and 42.3 per cent of sub-1,250 kg (2,750 lb) commercial vehicle market there. Nordhoff's recurring encouragement proved to be highly effective as he consistently urged the team to work harder, reduce expenses and avoid complacency and corporate inefficiencies. In January 1960, Nordhoff said:

We shall some day speak of the Golden Fifties. We are now moving away from them and we must recognise that fact and use the time given us. The wheel of history never turns back! Whatever opportunities you miss today will never return! The new year will have 366 days this time; every day, we will cross one off—and soon there will be only four left. No power of heaven or earth will bring those days back. Let us use this time, as long as we are free to do so, as we are now, and as we shall still be for a few years.

The Emden facility represented an expenditure exceeding DM154.4 million, with Beetle operations beginning there on 1 December 1964. By late 1965, Volkswagen's annual production exceeded 1,600,000 units, averaging 6,800 per day. Volkswagen's share of all cars produced in West Germany reached 48.6 per cent, representing a 3.3% increase from the previous year. When including Audis produced at Ingolstadt, the combined output from Volkswagen and its Auto-Union company constituted 50.4% of all West German cars produced that year. In 1968, the Type 1 was officially given the name "Beetle" (from "der Käfer", German for beetle).

=== Decline and end of West German production: 1970–1990 ===
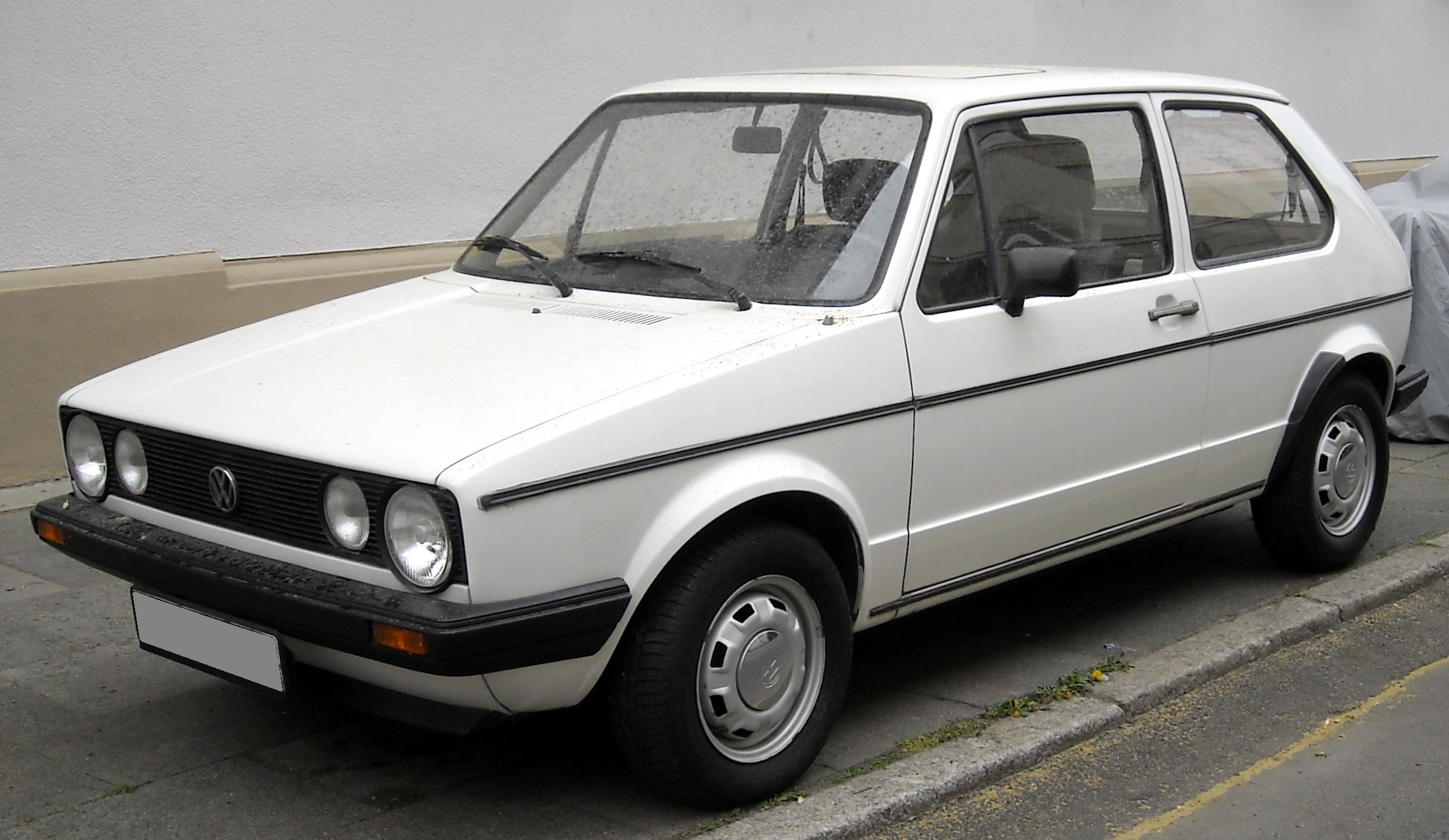
The first-generation Golf served as the Beetle's replacement once Wolfsburg production ended.

While it was largely successful in the 1960s, recording its highest sales growth in North America from 1960 to 1965, the Beetle started facing competition from more contemporary designs worldwide in the 1970s. The decade started out well for Volkswagen, which sold 569,000 Beetles in 1970. In 1970, fifteen Volkswagen dealerships in the United States convened in Washington, D.C., to implement the Volkswagen American Dealers Association, which was made to preserve a free market of imported international automobiles through political pressure and lobbying.

On 17 February 1972, the Beetle broke the world record for the best-selling automobile of all time, with a total of 15,007,034 units produced worldwide, surpassing the production figure that had been held by the American Ford Model T for nearly 50 years. Volkswagen donated the record-breaking car, a Super Beetle, to the Smithsonian Institution for permanent exhibition in its industrial history section. By 1973, over 16 million Beetles had been manufactured. On 1 July 1974, the final Beetle was produced at the Wolfsburg plant after 11,916,519 units were made there. Following its discontinuation, Volkswagen ceased ongoing development of the Beetle in Germany. On 19 January 1978, the last Beetle sedan manufactured in Europe rolled off the production line at the Emden plant with the chassis number 1182034030. Despite its discontinuation in Germany, production of the Beetle continued in Brazil, Mexico, and Nigeria.

In the 1960s and 1970s, Volkswagen augmented its product portfolio with several models to supplement the Beetle: the Type 3, the Type 4, and the NSU-based K70 sedan. None of these models achieved the level of success of the Beetle. The overdependence on a single model, which was experiencing a decline in popularity, meant that Volkswagen was in a financial crisis and needed government funding to produce the Beetle's replacement. Consequently, the company introduced four new water-cooled, front-engined, front-wheel-drive models: the Golf, Passat, Polo and Scirocco, all of which were styled by Italian automotive designer Giorgetto Giugiaro. By 1979, the Golf constituted more than 50 per cent of Volkswagen sales, eventually becoming the company's most successful model since the Beetle. As opposed to the Beetle, the Golf was substantially redesigned over its lifetime, with only a few components carried over between generations. On 10 January 1980, the final Beetle convertible of 330,281 rolled off the production line at the Karmann facility in Osnabrück. It was the most successful convertible for a long time, and was replaced by the first Golf cabriolet in 1979.

The number of Beetle units sold by Volkswagen was at its lowest in the 1980s, as the company faced competition from Japanese automakers such as Toyota and Honda, whose cars were uprated in reliability and performance. The 1988 closure of Volkswagen's Pennsylvania factory was due to high costs, subpar quality, and poor sales. In the United States, Volkswagen introduced the second-generation Golf and Corrado, both of which had little success. The overall sales suffered a significant downturn, leading to the loss of many dealerships for the company.

=== New Beetle and end of production: 1990–2003 ===
In 1991, the planning of a new car began once J Mays and Freeman Thomas returned to California to open Volkswagen's Design Centre at Simi Valley. Recognising that Japanese manufacturers dominated the market in the 1970s and 1980s, Volkswagen needed to introduce a vehicle to regain popularity. Before this, the company began the development of a city car, codenamed "Chico", in which they invested millions of Deutsche Marks. In 1993, the brand stated that the Chico was intended to begin production in 1995. However, this plan was abandoned when the company realised that the project was commercially infeasible. Mays and Thomas recognised the difficulties faced by Volkswagen, and suggested the need for a vehicle that included the recognisable design of the Beetle as a potential solution to improve customer appeal. During development, this car was known as the "Concept One" project. The prototype was revealed at the 1994 Detroit Motor Show, and a red convertible variant of the model was showcased at the 1995 Geneva Motor Show.

It took a year for Volkswagen to officially confirm the production of the concept in its final form, which was slated for completion by the end of the decade. To help gauge public demand of the forthcoming automobile in the United States, Volkswagen implemented a free-access telephone line to allow members to express their thoughts on the car. The line quickly became inundated with calls, with many saying, "You build it, I'll buy it!" Work on the Concept One continued, with further redesigns on its front fascia. To reduce production investments and expenses, Volkswagen initially planned to use the platform of the Polo. However, at the 1995 Tokyo Motor Show, the company unveiled another prototype, sharing its wheelbase and its broader range of engine options with the Golf. Simultaneously, Volkswagen announced that it would be named the "New Beetle". After more than six years of planning and development, Volkswagen introduced the New Beetle in 1997 for the 1998 model year.

On 30 July 2003 at 9:05 a.m., at the Puebla plant in Mexico, Volkswagen produced the final Type 1, after 21,529,464 examples were produced globally during its tenure. Its production span of 65 years is the longest of any single generation of automobile, and its total production of over 21.5 million is the most of any car of a single platform. To celebrate the occasion, Volkswagen marketed a series of 3,000 Beetles as "Última Edición" (Final Edition).

== Models and history of design ==
While the design of the Beetle changed little over its lifespan, Volkswagen implemented over 78,000 incremental updates. Typically subtle, these alterations usually involved minor updates to the exterior, interior, colours and lighting. More noteworthy changes have comprised new engines, models and systems, such as updated dashboards and hydraulic braking.

=== Initial and successful models: 1946–1974 ===
The Type 11 standard limousine, initially designated as the Type 60 before 1946, was dubbed the "Pretzel Beetle" due to its distinctive oval-shaped, vertically divided rear window. On 1 July 1949, the Volkswagen lineup was expanded to include the "export" model featuring enhanced interiors, chrome bumpers, and trim. It was offered in a variety of colours to distinguish it from the preceding "Standard" model. Starting in 1950, an optional sunroof with a textile cover could be added at an extra cost. By March of that year, the export model began to be equipped with a hydraulic brake system, which became a standard feature from April 1950 onwards. In 1952, the equipment was enhanced with the addition of vent windows in the doors, and the wheels were reduced to a diameter of 15 inches (380 mm) from the previous 16 inches (410 mm). On 10 March 1953, the split rear window was replaced with a one-piece rear window. Starting in 1954, the Type 122 engine had a 77 mm (3.0 in) cylinder bore, increased by 2 mm (0.08 in), and an engine displacement of 1,192 cc (1.2 L), surpassing the previous 1,131 cc (1.1 L). This engine produced 22 kW (30 PS), a 4 kW (5 PS) improvement over its predecessor. In 1955, the traditional VW semaphore turn signals were replaced by conventional flashing directional indicator lamps in North America, followed by the rest of the world in 1961. In 1958, the Beetle received a revised instrument panel, and a larger, rectangular rear window replaced the previous oval design.

"The 1961 Volkswagen sedan provides the kind of happy surprise that comes when an excellent motor vehicle is made even better."

— Motor Trend, August 1960

In 1960, Volkswagen introduced a series of technical alterations. The front indicators were relocated to the front bonnet within chrome housings, and the rear indicators were integrated into the tail lamps. In January 1960, the valve-clearing adjusting nut was slightly enlarged and resistor-type ignition leads were adopted. In March 1960, Volkswagen made several modifications to its front trailing arm and the steering damper. In May 1960, Volkswagen added plastic warm air ducts to decrease noise.

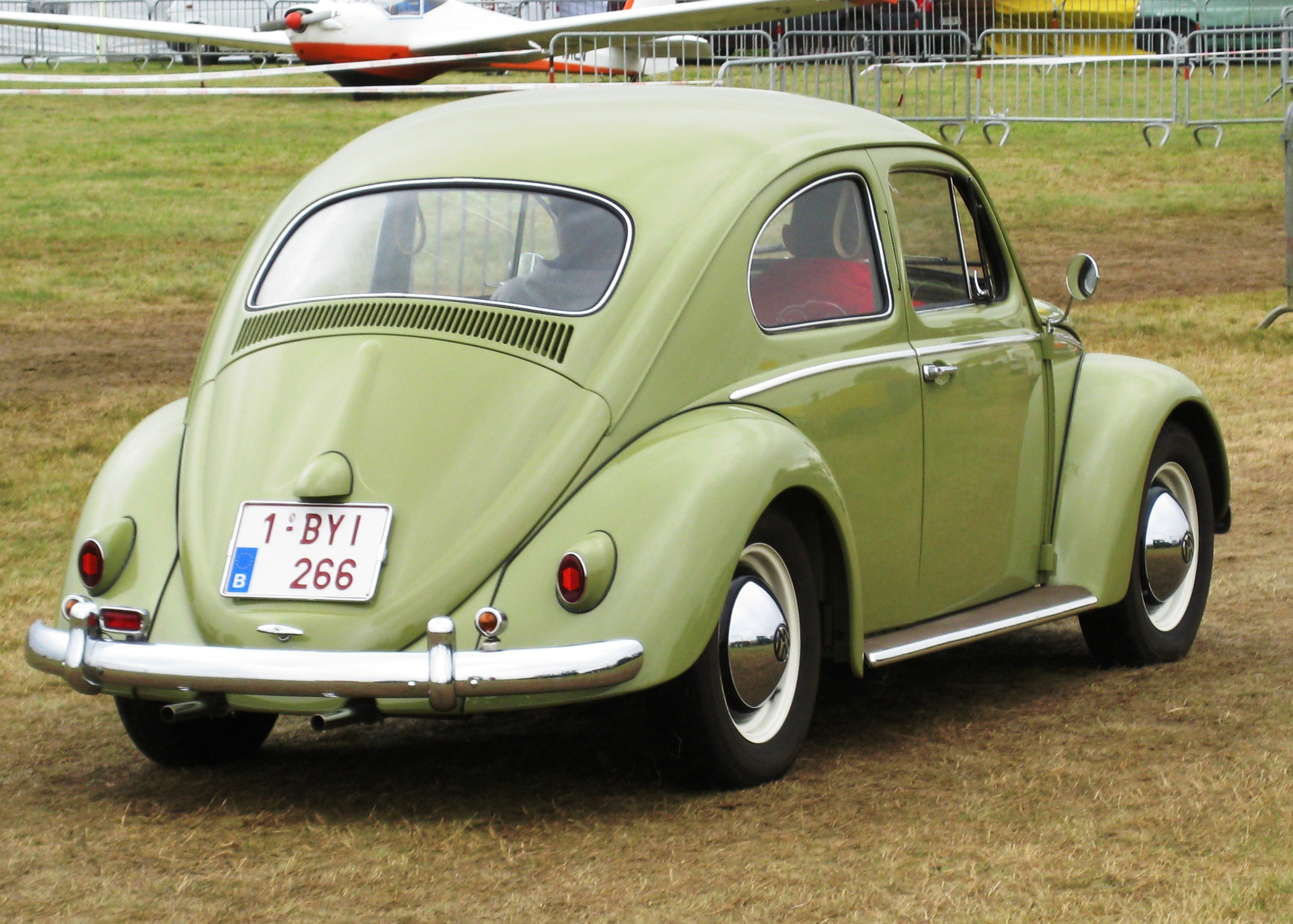
Rear view of a 1961 Volkswagen Type 1

In the mid-1960s, the traditional labels "standard" and "export" for the Beetle's model variants were superseded by numerical designations, approximately correlating with the engine displacements. In the October 1961 issue of Motor Trend, Don Werner noted, "Five years ago, out of every ten imported cars sold, six were Volkswagens. [The] latest figures show the ratio is now down to about every four [Volkswagens] out of every ten. If the current VW starts to slip, the new [Type 3]—soon to be introduced—probably will be imported to justify the [company's] more than 600 [Volkswagen] dealerships and the $100 million investment in facilities". He continued by expressing that the Type 3 had failed to leave a positive impression on industry executives in both Europe and North America. The new engine essentially possessed identical specifications to the previous model; it was a horizontally opposed, overhead valve, four-cylinder air-cooled engine. It generated 40 kW (54 PS; 54 hp) at 3,900 rpm and produced 83 N⋅m (61 lbf⋅ft) at 2,000 rpm.

The 1961 Beetle introduced a fully synchronised, four-speed manual transmission, replacing the non-synchronised first gear. Volkswagen implemented 27 alterations to the new model, some of which were minor. Noteworthy changes comprised an automatic choke, an anti-icing carburettor heater, a redesigned fuel tank that increased boot capacity, an external gas tank vent to prevent odours in the car, standard windshield wipers with a manual washer system, and a new ignition switch. Stylistic improvements included new paint colours and interior design options, a coloured steering wheel, a 150 km/h (90 mph) speedometer. For 1962, the manual windscreen washer system was replaced by a powered system that was pressurized by the air pressure in the front mounted spare wheel. The system included a built in-valve to prevent the tire from losing too much pressure to be usable. This system would be implemented in multiple other VW models throughout the 1960s and 1970s. On 30 July 1962, Volkswagen made several updates for the 1963 model year, including the incorporation of an air filter into the oil filter, the introduction of larger-diameter cylinder head induction ports and the adoption of plastic for the headliner and window guides. Volkswagen replaced the Wolfsburg crest on the hood, which had been present since 1951, with the company's lettering. A heating system was also introduced. In 1965, the 1200A designation was introduced for the standard Beetle with the 22 kW (30 PS) engine.

In August 1965, Volkswagen introduced the 1300, equipped with a 1.3-litre engine producing 29 kW (40 PS). Although it featured an identical design, the 6 PS (4.4 kW) increase was achieved through the adoption of the crankshaft from the Type 3. This extended the stroke from 64 mm (2.5 in) to 69 mm (2.7 in), resulting in an engine displacement of 1,285 cc (1.3 L). 1965 also marked the Beetle's most extensive design change when its body stampings were extensively revised, allowing for significantly larger windows, a departure from previous designs. The windshield increased by 11% in area and adopted a slight curvature, replacing its flat configuration. Door windows also expanded by 6%, with a slight backward canting of door vent window edges. Rear side windows increased by 17.5%, and the rear window by 19.5%.

In 1967, updates comprised shortened front and rear bonnets, box-profile bumpers with a railway rails design that were installed at a higher position, vertically oriented scattering discs for the headlights and larger rear lights with an iron design. Volkswagen introduced an external fuel filler flap, eliminating the need to open the front bonnet for refuelling. In September 1967, the 1500 Beetle was introduced. Its engine displacement was approximately 1.5 litres (1,493 cc), its power output was 32 kW (44 PS) and featured a three-speed semi-automatic transmission. In 1968, the 1200 received fully independent suspension, some stylistic improvements and an external fuel cap. The 1300 transitioned from six-volt to twelve-volt electrics and received dual circuit braking and a fuel gauge. The 1500 also received these alterations, as well as carburettor enhancements. In 1969, the 1200 received twelve-volt electrics, hazard warning lamps and a locking fuel cap. The 1300 was available with a semi-automatic transmission and radial-ply tyres. In 1970, the 1500 received a new carburettor and dual circuit braking, and Volkswagen discontinued the 1500.

In 1971, the 1200 received a larger windscreen, while the 1300 received a power increase to 32 kW (44 PS) and larger brakes, effectively replacing the 1500. Volkswagen replaced the 1300 with the 1300A "economy version" in 1973 for the 1974 model year, possessing the same specifications as the 1300 but maintaining the same overall design as the 1200.

=== Mid-life and declining models: 1970–1986 ===
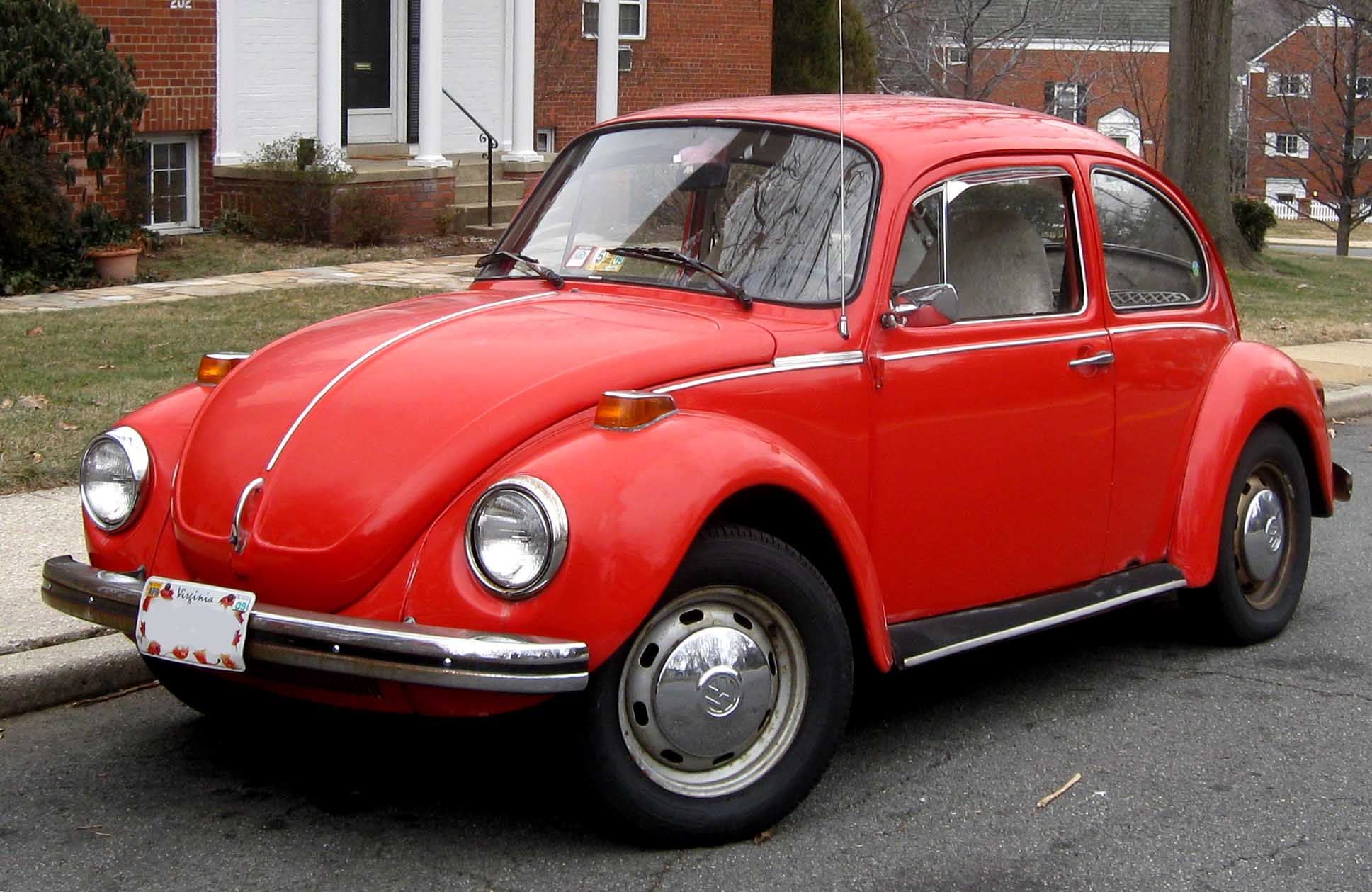
Volkswagen 1303 ("Super Beetle")

The VW 1302, introduced in August 1970, featured a redesigned front end. It incorporated a new front axle featuring MacPherson suspension struts, wishbones and a stabiliser. The enlargement of the front trunk became possible as a result. Unlike its predecessor, the spare wheel was no longer positioned diagonally at the front under the hood but instead rested horizontally under a cover in the trunk area. The company initially intended to designate the car as the "1301", but a trademark already held by the French company Simca compelled Volkswagen to use "1302" instead. Volkswagen produced the more powerful 1302S alongside the 1302. The latter has an engine displacement of 1.3 litres (1,285 cc), while the former has a capacity of 1.6 litres (1,584 cc). In English-speaking countries, the name "Super Beetle"—alongside "1600"—was included on the written description but not the engine cover.

The 1302 possessed the same 32.4 kW (44 PS) output as the 1300, whereas the 1302S saw an increase to 36.8 kW (50 PS). This was facilitated by a twin-port cylinder head, enabling the engines to breathe more effortlessly. The British automotive magazine Autocar expressed disappointment in its power increase, noting, "Even with 14 [per cent] more power, the total output of 50 bhp is very modest for the size of the engine". The Super Beetle had a 2 cm (0.8 in) increase in wheelbase, but the extra space was in front of the windshield. For 1971, the overall length increased by 8 cm (3.1 in), doubling the front trunk capacity and adding 3 cu ft (0.1 m^{3}) of luggage space. Volkswagen also implemented a new "flow through" ventilation system, drawing its air from a vent below the windshield and exiting the rear quarter panels.

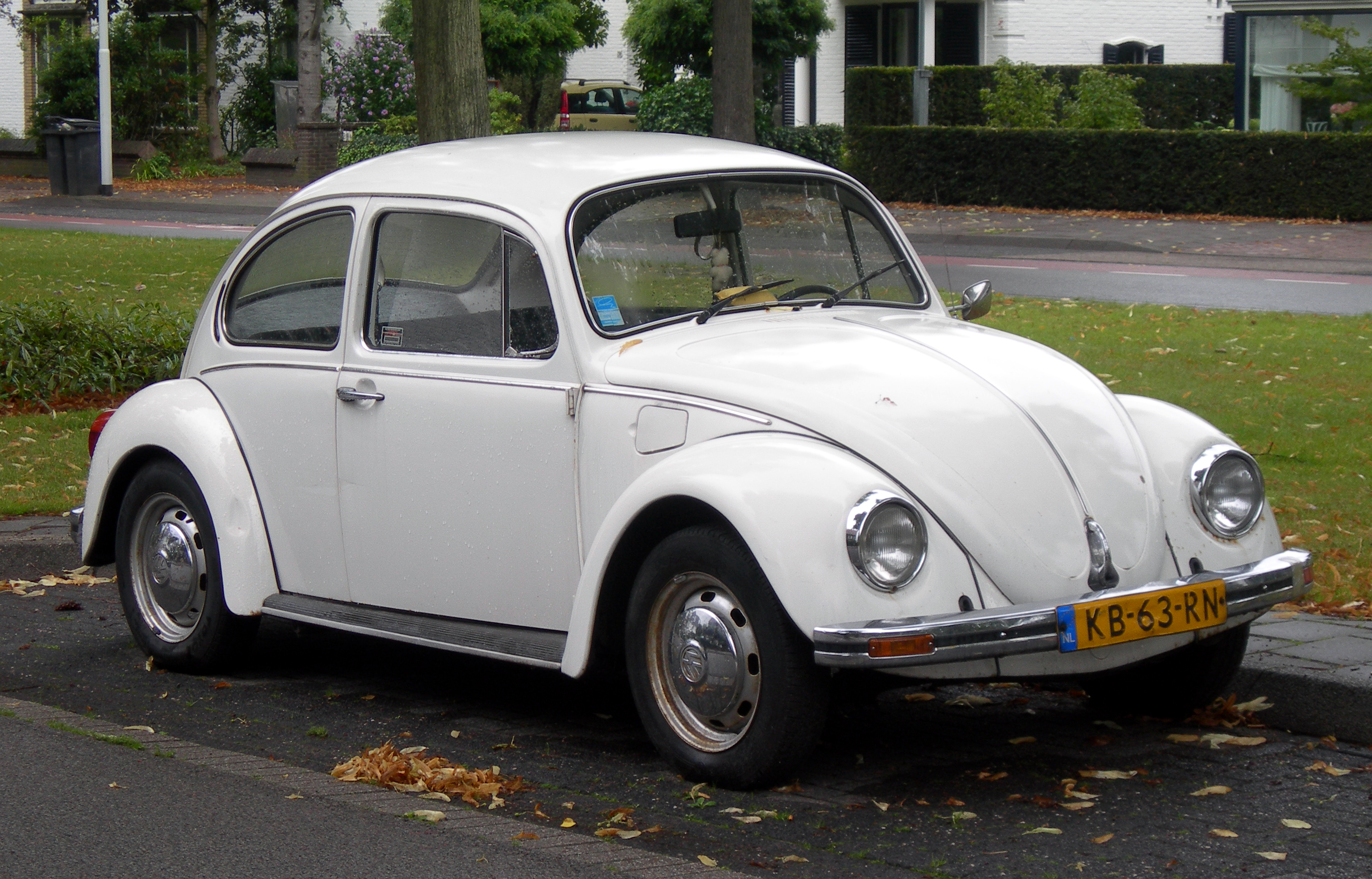
1983 Volkswagen 1200

In August 1972, the 1303 range superseded the 1302 model, which featured a curved windshield. This design change elicited mixed opinions. Despite the effort to infuse the Beetle with a modernised design, this did not resonate with consumers, resulting in declining Beetle sales. (Note: For more information about its decline, see § Decline and end of German production) In 1975, the 1303 and 1303S received rack and pinion steering, but in July of that year, Volkswagen discontinued both of them. The long-serving 1200 was renamed the "1200L" in 1976, with the additional deluxe features incorporated into the car's interior. In July 1984, Volkswagen eliminated the engine lid louvres.

=== Final models: 1986–2003 ===
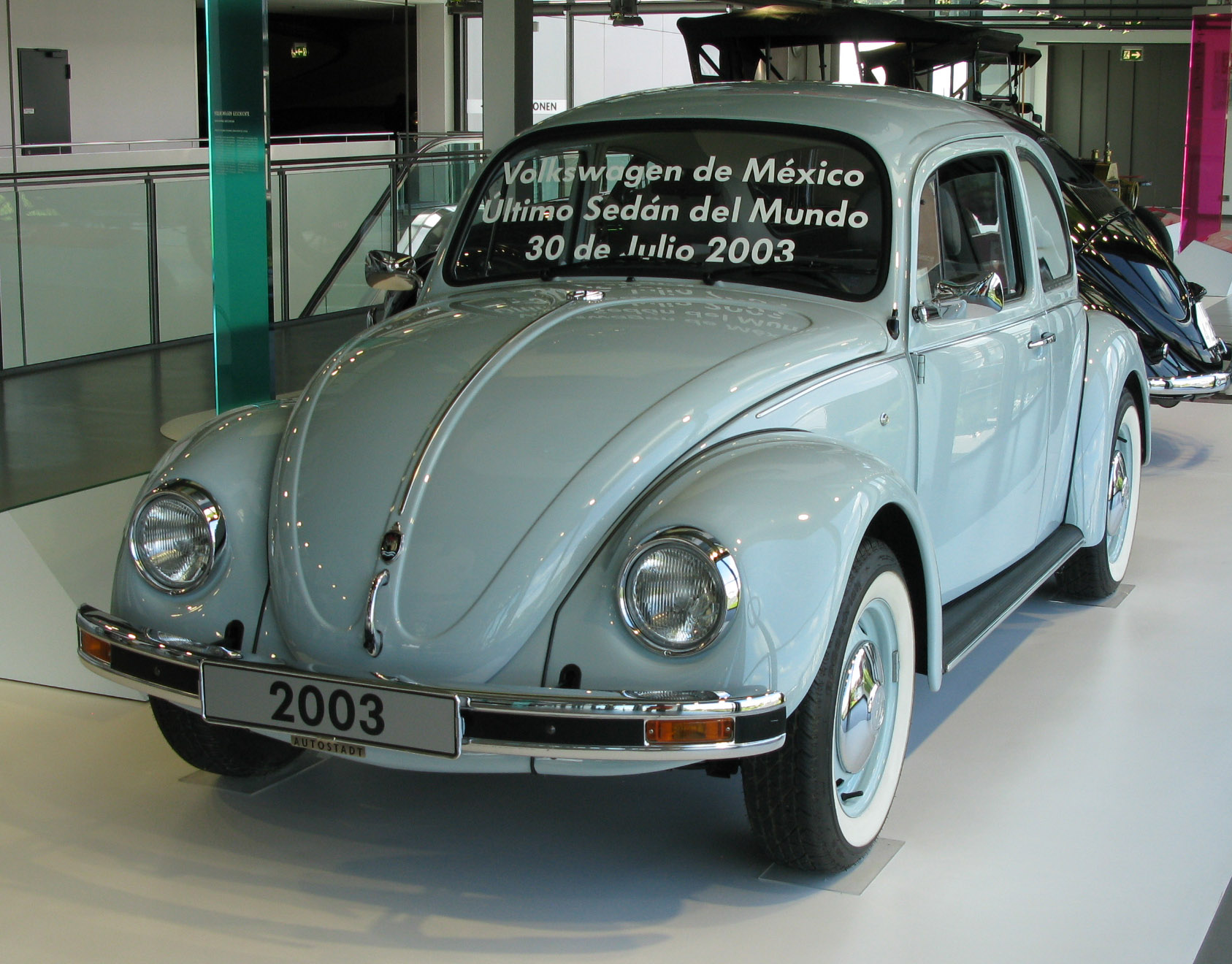
"Última Edición" (Final Edition) in Aquarius Blue (2003)

Starting in 1986, for the 1987 model year, the sole model available was the single-carburettor version with 1.6 litres (1,584 cc). From late 1992 for the 1993 model year, Volkswagen standardised catalytic converters, the Bosch Digifant engine management system, a lambda probe and electric ignition. This fuel-injection system proved much more straightforward and reliable than previous injection systems used on German-assembled Volkswagens since 1967. Vehicles with these modifications can be identified externally by the reintroduced louvred engine lid, heavier and larger bumper bars, four-stud wheels with twenty ventilation holes and a "1600i" badge on the engine lid. The 1993 model also featured a third-generation Golf-style steering wheel and front seats, a protection alarm, handbrake and engine compartment lamps and an optional ZF limited-slip differential. The engine received hydraulic tappets, a full-flow oil filter, a 6.6:1 compression ratio—allowing for the use of unleaded fuel—and an electric fuel pump. A standard version was also released in 1993, featuring painted bumper bars and many minor removals.

From 1997, front disc brakes and an immobiliser became available, and the De Luxe model featured small traffic indicator side lamps ahead of the top door hinge. The steering wheel's centre boss was restyled to resemble that of the contemporary Golf and Polo. In 1998, Volkswagen removed the small through-flow ventilation slots behind the rear side windows and standardised front disc brakes. Furthermore, Volkswagen included a security alarm as standard and removed the "1600i" inscription from the engine lid.

== Cultural impact and legacy ==
While the Beetle was seen throughout its production as an affordable car appealing to the masses, its near-consistent style over its 65-year run coupled with record-breaking sales led to the car becoming a global cultural icon. The company's advertising campaign from the 1950s through the 1970s achieved significant success due to its playful and sometimes self-deprecating nature. The campaign, including the famed "Think Small" ad, was voted the best of the 20th century by Ad Age, while the 1960 "Lemon" ad popularized the term lemon car. The punch buggy car trip game, also called slug bug, took hold around this time. During the 1960s, its low purchase and operating costs, combined with its quirky style, made the model's popularity soar in several subcultures that morphed its popular image in the United States and beyond. Hippies, as part of the counterculture movement, embraced the Beetle as a symbol of anti-materialism. At the beach and desert, the Beetle served as the platform for modified off-road vehicles such as Baja Bugs and fiberglass-bodied dune buggies, due to the large variety of aftermarket performance equipment available from companies such as EMPI.

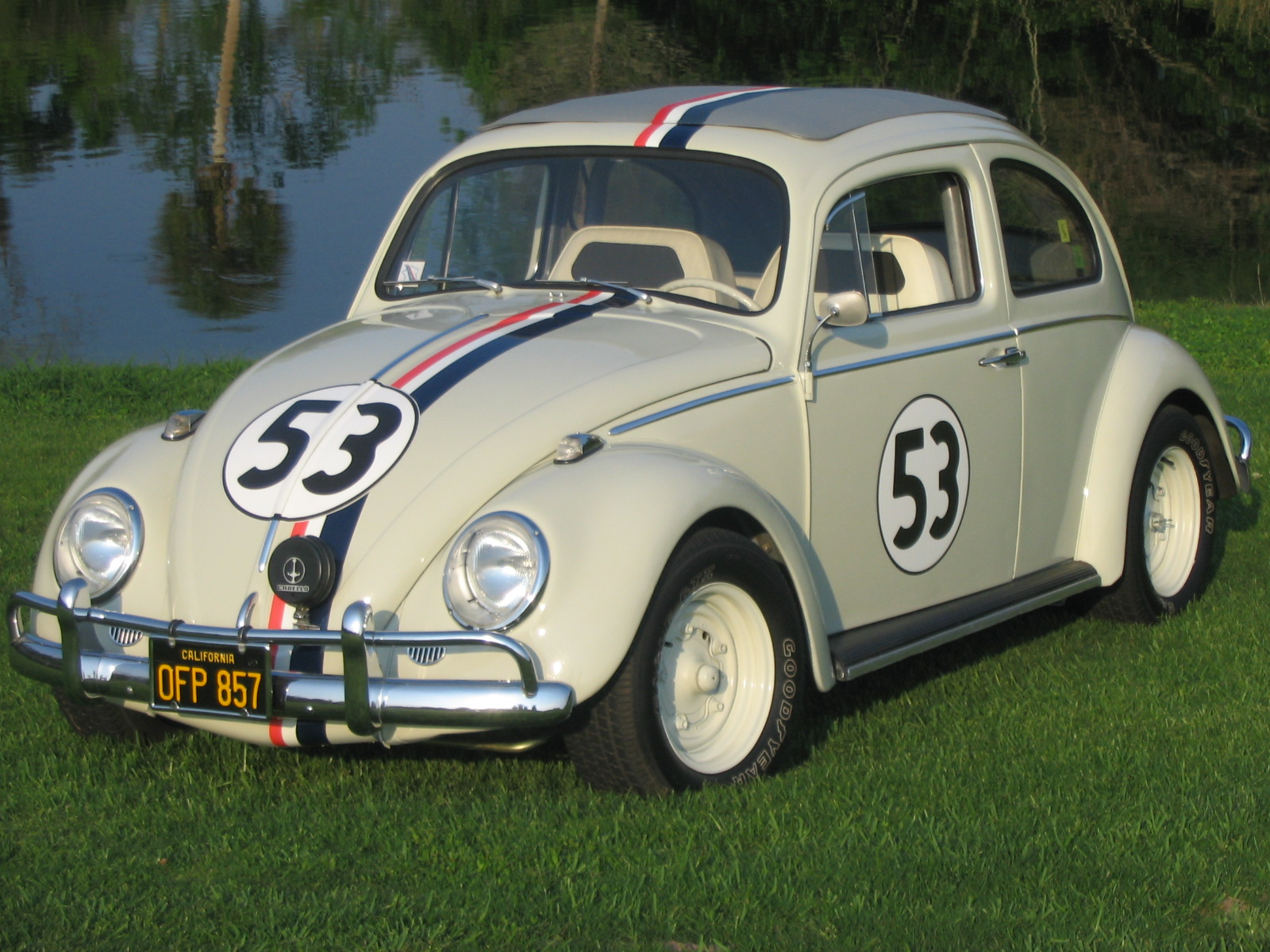
An original Herbie used by Disney for the filming of Herbie Goes to Monte Carlo

With its growing cult status, the Beetle began to feature prominently in mass media. Herbie, a sentient 1963 Beetle race car, is a fictional Disney character that helmed a five-decade series of films and TV appearances. Starting with the film The Love Bug, which was one of the top grossing movies of 1969, Herbie himself became a fixture in popular culture, and was partially responsible for boosting Beetle sales in the late 1960s and early 1970s. In response, American Volkswagen dealers offered cross-promotions with the release of Herbie sequels, with items ranging from posters to Herbie decal kits, and a Love Bug special edition of 1974 Beetles. The Beetle also featured prominently in the Superbug film series produced in West Germany, and as Bumblebee in the Transformers franchise.

Despite production ending worldwide by 2003, the Beetle continues to have an enduring impact on society. In Mexico, the Beetle remained in production for 25 years after European manufacturing ceased, and has become an essential part of the country's culture. Nostalgia for the model led Volkswagen to introduce the New Beetle and a follow-up model, redesigned Golf-based versions that were in production from 1997 to 2019. Enthusiasts continue to buy, restore, and modify original Beetles, and several enthusiast subcultures exist, including Beetle-based art cars, Cal-Style VWs, Cal Look Beetles, hot-rod crossovers, dune buggies, Baja Bugs, and Herbie replicas. In 2023, Volkswagen partnered with eClassics to produce an electric-power retrofit kit for vintage Beetles, with a 36.8 kWh battery that provides a top speed of 150 kilometres per hour (93 mph) and an estimated range of 200 kilometres (120 mi).

== Markets and assembly ==
Over its 65-year tenure, Volkswagen produced the Volkswagen Type 1 in numerous locations worldwide. The following list encompasses all the locations in which it was manufactured.

- Melbourne, Australia
- Brussels, Belgium
- São Bernardo do Campo, Brazil
- Heinola, Finland
- Emden, Germany
- Hanover, Germany
- Ingolstadt, Germany
- Osnabrück, Germany (Note: The convertibles were constructed at this location, not the coupes.)
- Wolfsburg, Germany
- Jakarta, Indonesia
- (Republic of Ireland) Dublin, Ireland
- Shah Alam, Malaysia
- Puebla, Mexico
- Auckland, New Zealand
- Lagos, Nigeria
- Manila, Philippines
- Uitenhage, South Africa
- Bangkok, Thailand
- Caracas, Venezuela
- (Socialist Federal Republic of Yugoslavia) Sarajevo, Yugoslavia

=== Specific markets ===
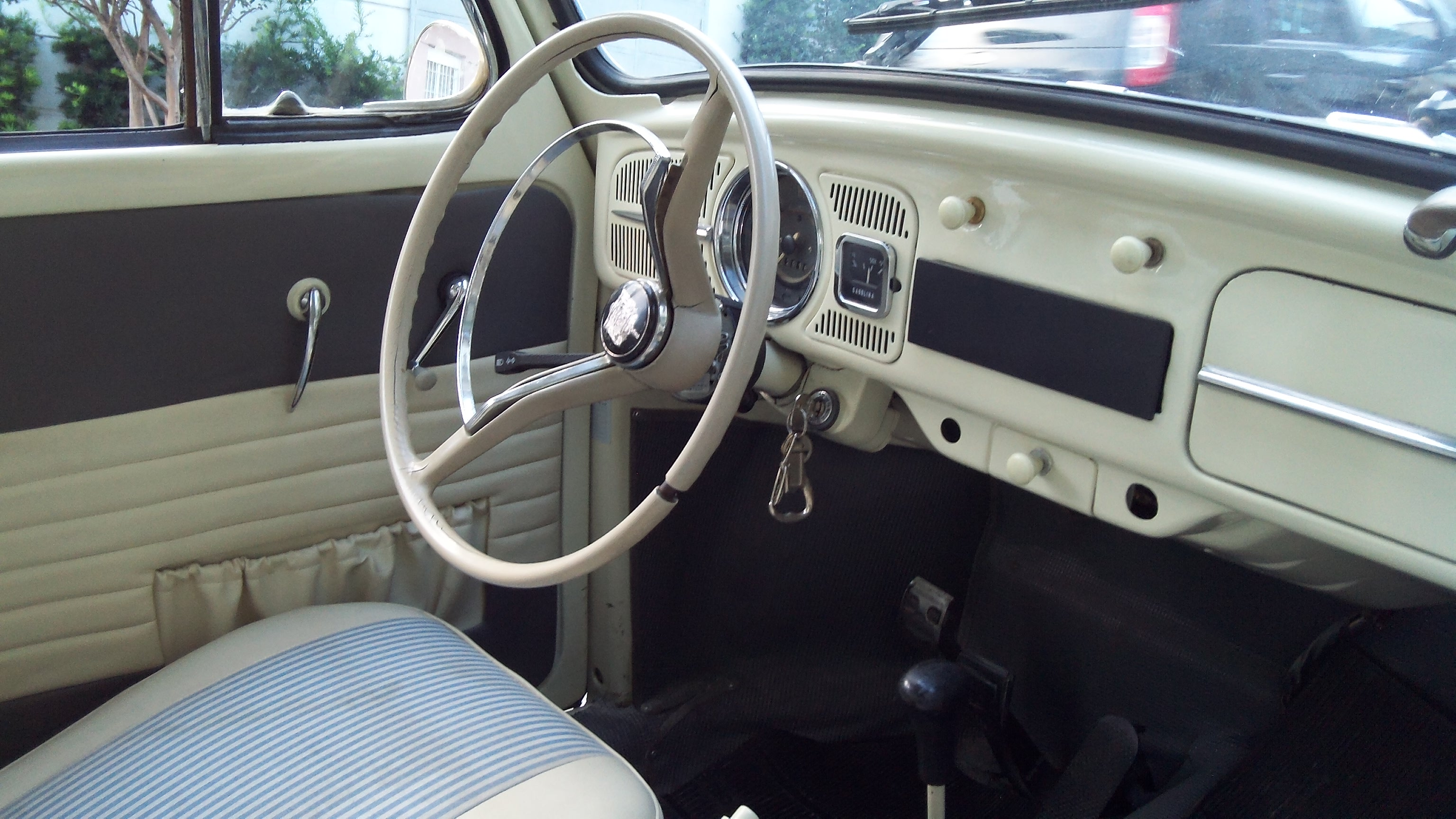
Interior of the 1961 Brazilian-built Fusca

==== Brazil ====
Official exportation of the Beetle to the Brazilian market began on 23 March 1953, with its parts imported from Germany. For the local market, the Type 1 was officially known "Volkswagen Fusca". In January 1959, Volkswagen shifted assembly to the new São Bernardo do Campo plant, initially maintaining 60 per cent of its German parts. However, by the mid-1960s, the cars had about 99.93 per cent Brazilian-made components. In 1965, the Brazilian government created a new automobile financing tool through its publicly owned bank Caixa Econômica Federal that would allow Brazilians to finance certain new vehicles over four years with a monthly interest rate of 1%. Manufacturers were ordered to create cut-price variants of their existing models to lower prices by 30-40 percent, these models being the only ones eligible for the low-interest loans. Volkswagen responded with a decontented version of their 1200, nicknamed the Pé de Boi ("Ox Foot"), with nearly all chrome and creature comforts removed. Production of this version ended in 1966 as the program was not a success.

Production continued until 1986, after over 3.3 million examples were produced there. In a response to popular demand, production resumed in 1992, lasting until 1996. Sales were not substantial the second time around; in 1993 Volkswagen delivered 18,171 Fuscas; this was about half of the sales in 1986 and no more than a month's sales in the 1970s.

==== Mexico ====
The production of the Beetle was possible through agreements with companies like Chrysler in Mexico and the Studebaker-Packard Corporation, which assembled cars imported in complete knock-down form. The Beetle was introduced to the Mexican market in 1954, and began official production ten years later. The local market referred to the Beetle as the "Vocho". The introduction of a new taxi regulation in Mexico City, requiring only four-door vehicles to be permitted to prevent robberies, influenced Volkswagen's decision to end the production of the Beetle in 2003. (Note: For a complete overview of the discontinuation of the Beetle, see § New Beetle and end of production)

==== Australia ====
Formal introduction of the Volkswagen Beetle to the Australian market took place in 1953, followed by local assembly operations at the Clayton, Victoria facility in the subsequent year. The establishment of Volkswagen Australia Ltd took place in 1957, and by 1960, locally manufactured body panels were integrated for the first time. Despite the introduction of larger windows for the European Type One body in 1965, Volkswagen Australia opted to maintain production of the smaller-windowed bodies with features tailored for Australian models. This decision was influenced by the constraints of the market size and the expenses associated with retooling. By this juncture, Australian content had surged to nearly 95 per cent. The final Australian-assembled Beetle rolled off the production line in July 1976.

== See also ==
- Volkswagen Type 2
- Volkswagen New Beetle
- Volkswagen Beetle (A5)
- Volkswagen Type 18A
- Volkswagen Type 14A (Hebmüller Cabriolet)

== Sources ==
- Adler, Dennis (2003). Porsche. United States: Motorbooks. ISBN 978-0-7603-5190-1.
- Angolia, J. R.; Littlejohn, David (1999). Labor Organizations of the Reich. Germany: R.J. Bender Publishing. ISBN 978-0-9121-3876-3.
- Barber, Chris (2003). Birth of the Beetle. United Kingdom: Haynes Manual. ISBN 978-1-8596-0959-0.
- Becker, Doreen (2016). Color Trends and Selection for Product Design. Germany: Elsevier Science. ISBN 978-0-3233-9406-2.
- Bobbitt, Malcolm (2001). The Volkswagen Bus Book. Italy: Veloce Publishing. ISBN 978-1-8458-4995-5.
- Burt, William (2002). Volkswagen Beetle. United States: Motorbooks International. ISBN 978-1-6105-9244-4.
- Carroll, Bill (2016). Volkswagen Guide. Italy: Edizioni Savine. ISBN 978-8-8963-6599-1.
- Cassis, Youssef; De Luca, Giuseppe; Florio, Massimo (2015). Infrastructure Finance in Europe. United Kingdom: Oxford University Press. ISBN 978-0-1987-1341-8.
- Christopher, John (2012). The Race for Hitler's X-Planes. United Kingdom: The History Press. ISBN 978-0-7524-7711-4.
- Cleaver, E. L.; Clute, Eugene; Reid, Kenneth; Whitehead, R. F. (1961). "Progressive Architecture". Vol. 42. United States: Reinhold Publishing Corporation.
- Copping, Richard (2001). VW Beetle. Italy: Veloce Publishing. ISBN 978-1-8458-4732-6.
- Copping, Richard (2018). VW Beetle Specification Guide 1949–1967. United Kingdom: Crowood Press. ISBN 978-1-7850-0490-2.
- Copping, Richard (2005). Volkswagen. United Kingdom: Veloce Publishing. ISBN 978-1-9047-8892-8.
- Copping, Richard (2002). VW Beetle: The Car of the 20th Century. United Kingdom: Veloce Publishing. ISBN 978-1-901295-863.
- Copping, Richard (2023). VW Golf. United Kingdom: Amberley Publishing. ISBN 978-1-3981-1338-1.
- Copping, Richard (2011). Volkswagen Beetle. United Kingdom: Veloce Publishing. ISBN 978-1-7871-1643-6.
- Copping, Richard (2014). Volkswagen Beetle. United Kingdom: Bloomsbury Publishing. ISBN 978-1-7844-2021-5.
- Copping, Richard; Cservenka, Ken (2005). Volkswagen Beetle. Italy: Veloce Publishing. ISBN 978-1-9047-8872-0.
- Coyle, Philip (2004). 50 years of Volkswagens in New Zealand. New Zealand: Transpress. ISBN 978-0-9088-7650-1.
- Dageför, Werner (1997). Käfer, der Erfolkswagen [Beetle, the successful car]. Germany: Prestel Publishing. ISBN 978-3-7913-1891-2.
- Euler, Christian (2010). Porsche und Volkswagen [Porsche and Volkswagen]. Germany: Wiley. ISBN 978-3-5275-0523-4.
- Etzold, Hans-Rüdiger (1983). Der Käfer [The Beetle]. Germany: Bucheli. ISBN 978-3-7168-1613-4.
- Etzold, Hans-Rüdiger (1988a). The Beetle: The Chronicles of the People's Car. United Kingdom: Haynes Manual. ISBN 978-0-8542-9845-7.
- Etzold, Hans-Rüdiger (1988b). The Beetle: Design and evolution, the story. United Kingdom: Haynes Manual. ISBN 978-0-8542-9648-4.
- Faragher, Scott (2005). Porsche The Ultimate Guide: Everything You Need to Know About Every Porsche Ever Built. United States: Krause Publications. ISBN 0-87349-720-1.
- Flammang, J. M. (1996). Volkswagen. Michigan: Krause Publications. ISBN 978-0-8734-1419-7.
- Glen, Simon (2003). Volkswagen's of the World. Italy: Veloce Publishing. ISBN 978-1-9037-0693-0.
- Glen, Simon (2017). Volkswagen Type 3. Italy: Veloce Publishing. ISBN 978-1-8458-4952-8.
- Gooding, Richard (2016). Porsche 914. London: Crowood Publishing. ISBN 978-1-7850-0152-9.
- Gunnell, John (2017). The Complete Book of Classic Volkswagens. United States: Motorbooks. ISBN 978-0-7603-4987-8.
- Hale, James (2004). How To Modify Volkswagen Beetle Chassis, Suspension & Brakes. Italy: Veloce Publishing. ISBN 978-1-9037-0699-2.
- Hayes, Rusell (2020). Volkswagen Beetles and Buses. United States: Motorbooks. ISBN 978-0-7603-6767-4.
- Herda, D. J. (2008). Zen & the Art of Pond Building. United Kingdom: Sterling Publishing Company, Inc. ISBN 978-1-4027-4274-3. Archived from the original on 7 March 2024 – via Google Books.
- Hielscher, Ulrich (2020). Die Wahrheit bedeutet Schuld [The truth means guilt]. Germany: TwentySix. ISBN 978-0-3455-2142-2.
- Hiott, Andrea (2012). Thinking Small: The Long Strange Trip. New York: Random House. ISBN 978-0-3455-2142-2.
- Hopfinger, K. B. (1954). Beyond Expectation. Indiana: G. T. Foulis. ISBN 978-0-5986-4028-4.
- Imseng, Dominik (2016). Ugly is Only Skin-deep. United Kingdom: Matador. ISBN 978-1-7858-9317-9.
- Ingrassia, Paul (2012). Engines of Change. United States: Simon & Schuster. ISBN 978-1-4516-4063-2.
- Kiley, David (2002). Getting the Bugs Out. United States: Wiley Publishing. ISBN 978-0-4712-2598-0.
- Klein, Karl (1938). Drogisten Zeitung. Archived from the original on 16 February 2024 – via Austrian National Library.
- Leffingwell, Randy (2022). Porsche 75th Anniversary. United States: Motorbooks. ISBN 978-0-7603-7266-1.
- Ludvigsen, Karl (2000). Battle for the Beetle. Cambridge, Massachusetts: R. Bentley. ISBN 0-8376-0071-5.
- Marsh, W. B. (2020). Voices From the Past. Canada: Icon Books. ISBN 978-1-7842-9114-3.
- Mantle, Jonathan (2014). Companies That Changed the World. London: Transworld. ISBN 978-1-7857-8664-8.
- Margolius, Ivan; Henry, J. G. (2016). Tatra – The Legacy of Hans Ledwinka. England: Veloce Publishing. ISBN 978-1-8458-4799-9.
- Mayer, Hans-Georg (1988). Der VW-Käfer im Kriege und im militärischen Einsatz danach [The VW Beetle during the war and in military use afterwards] (in German). Germany: Podzun-Pallas. ISBN 978-3-7909-0357-7.
- Maxton, G. P; Wormald, John (1996). Driving Over a Cliff?. London: Economist Intelligence Unit. ISBN 978-0-2015-9392-1.
- Meyer-Larsen, Werner (2000). Germany, Inc. California: Wiley. ISBN 978-0-4713-5357-7.
- Meck, Georg (2016). Auto Macht Geld [Car makes money]. Germany: Rowohlt Verlag. ISBN 978-3-6441-0003-9.
- Molenaar, Vincent; Prinz, Alexander (2013). VW Transporter and Microbus Specification Guide 1967–1979. London: Crowood Press. ISBN 978-1-8479-7545-4.
- Mommsen, Hans; Grieger, Manfred (1996). Das Volkswagenwerk und seine Arbeiter im Dritten Reich [The Volkswagen factory and its workers in the Third Reich]. Germany: ECON. ISBN 978-3-4301-6785-7.
- McCarthy, Mike (1986). Porsche. Canada: Gallery Publishing Group. ISBN 978-0-8317-7088-4.
- Möser, Kurt (1997). Geschichte des Autos [History of the car]. Germany: Campus-Verlag. ISBN 978-3-5933-6575-6.
- Nelson, W. H. (1965). Small Wonder. United States: Robert Bentley, Publishers. ISBN 978-0-8376-0147-2. LCCN 98022447. OCLC 39060652.
- Nolan, Peter (2015). Re-Balancing China. India: Anthem Press. ISBN 978-1-7830-8416-6.
- Patton, Phil (2002). Bug. United Kingdom: Simon & Schuster. ISBN 978-0-7432-0242-8.
- Peene, James (2022). VW Classic Beetle. London: Crowood Press. ISBN 978-0-7198-4014-2.
- Pfundner, Martin; Christoph Graf von Seherr-Thoss, Hans; Swann, Andrew (2005). Alpine Trials & Rallies. United Kingdom: Veloce Publishing. ISBN 978-1-9047-8895-9.
- Quigley, Jon M.; Robertson, Kim L. (2016). Configuration Management: Theory, Practice, and Application. CRC Press. ISBN 978-1-4822-2936-3.
- Price, R. L. (2003). The VW Beetle. United States: Berkley Publishing Group. ISBN 978-1-5578-8421-3. OCLC 53368758.
- Reich, Simon (2018). The Fruits of Fascism. New York: Cornell University Press. ISBN 978-1-5017-3215-7.
- Rosenow, Nicholas (2013). Volkswagen Käfer (in German). Germany: Motorbuch Verlag. ISBN 978-3-6133-1023-0.
- Rieger, Bernhard (2013). The People's Car. Massachusetts: Harvard University Press. ISBN 978-0-6740-7575-7.
- Riegler, Thomas (2019). Motor-Klassiker [Motor Classic]. Germany: Franzis Verlag. ISBN 978-3-6452-0510-8.
- Schmarbeck, Wolfgang (1990). Hans Ledwinka: Seine Autos – Sein Leben (in German). Graz: Weishaupt. ISBN 3-900310-56-4.
- Schmitz, Ulrich (1990). Postmoderne Concierge: Die Tagesschau [Postmodern Concierge: The Tagesschau]. Germany: VS Verlag für Sozialwissenschaften. ISBN 978-3-6630-6747-4.
- Scholz, Natalie (2023). Redeeming Objects. Wisconsin: University of Wisconsin Press. ISBN 978-0-2993-4430-6.
- Schnetler, Fred (1997). A century of cars. South Africa: Tafelberg. ISBN 978-0-6240-3623-4.
- Seume, Keith (2001a). VW New Beetle : The Performance Handbook. United States: Motorbooks International. ISBN 978-1-6105-9248-2.
- Seume, Keith (2001b). Volkswagen Cars and Trucks. United States: Motorbooks International. ISBN 978-1-6105-9246-8.
- Shuler, Terry; Borgeson, Griffith; Sloniger, Jerry (1985). The Origin and Evolution of the VW Beetle. Virginia: Princeton Pub. ISBN 978-0-9150-3845-9.
- Shuler, Terry (1996). Volkswagen, Then, Now, and Forever. United States: Beeman Jorgensen. ISBN 978-0-9297-5812-1.
- Sloniger, Jerry (1980). The VW Story. Patrick Stephens. ISBN 0-85059-441-3.
- Szantai, Stephan (2022). Vintage Volkswagen Beetle Accessories. CarTech, Incorporated. ISBN 978-1-6132-5750-0.
- Terenna, Barry (2012). Take the Silk Road Home. United Kingdom: Lulu Press, Inc. ISBN 978-1-1058-2576-7.
- Tyler, Jim (2004). How to Restore Volkswagen Beetle. Italy: Veloce Publishing. ISBN 978-1-9037-0690-9.
- Weertman, W. L. (2007). Chrysler Engines, 1922–1998. United States: SAE International. ISBN 978-0-7680-3181-2.
- Welch, David (2008). The Third Reich. United Kingdom: Taylor & Francis. ISBN 978-1-1344-7750-0.
- Wiersch, Bernd (2005). Die Käfer-Chronik [The Beetle Chronicle]. Germany: Delius Klasing. ISBN 978-3-7688-1695-3.
- Willson, Quentin; Selby, David (1995). The Ultimate Classic Car Book. New York: Dorling Kindersley Limited. ISBN 0-7894-0159-2.
- Wood, Jonathan (2003). The Volkswagen Beetle. United Kingdom: Osprey Publishing. ISBN 978-0-7478-0565-6.
- Ziemann, Benjamin; Rossol, Nadine (2021). The Oxford Handbook of the Weimar Republic. United Kingdom: Oxford University Press. ISBN 978-0-1988-4577-5.
