= NKC =

NKC is a three letter abbreviation that may refer to:

- IATA airport code for Nouakchott–Oumtounsy International Airport
- National Kennel Club, all-breed dog registry in the United States
- Nat King Cole, American jazz singer/musician
- NDR-Klein-Computer, a German computer
- Northwest Kidney Centers, outpatient hemodialysis treatment center
- Natural killer cell, cell involved in the innate immune system
- National Knowledge Commission, Indian Commission set up by Manmohan Singh
