= List of names for the Volkswagen Type 1 =

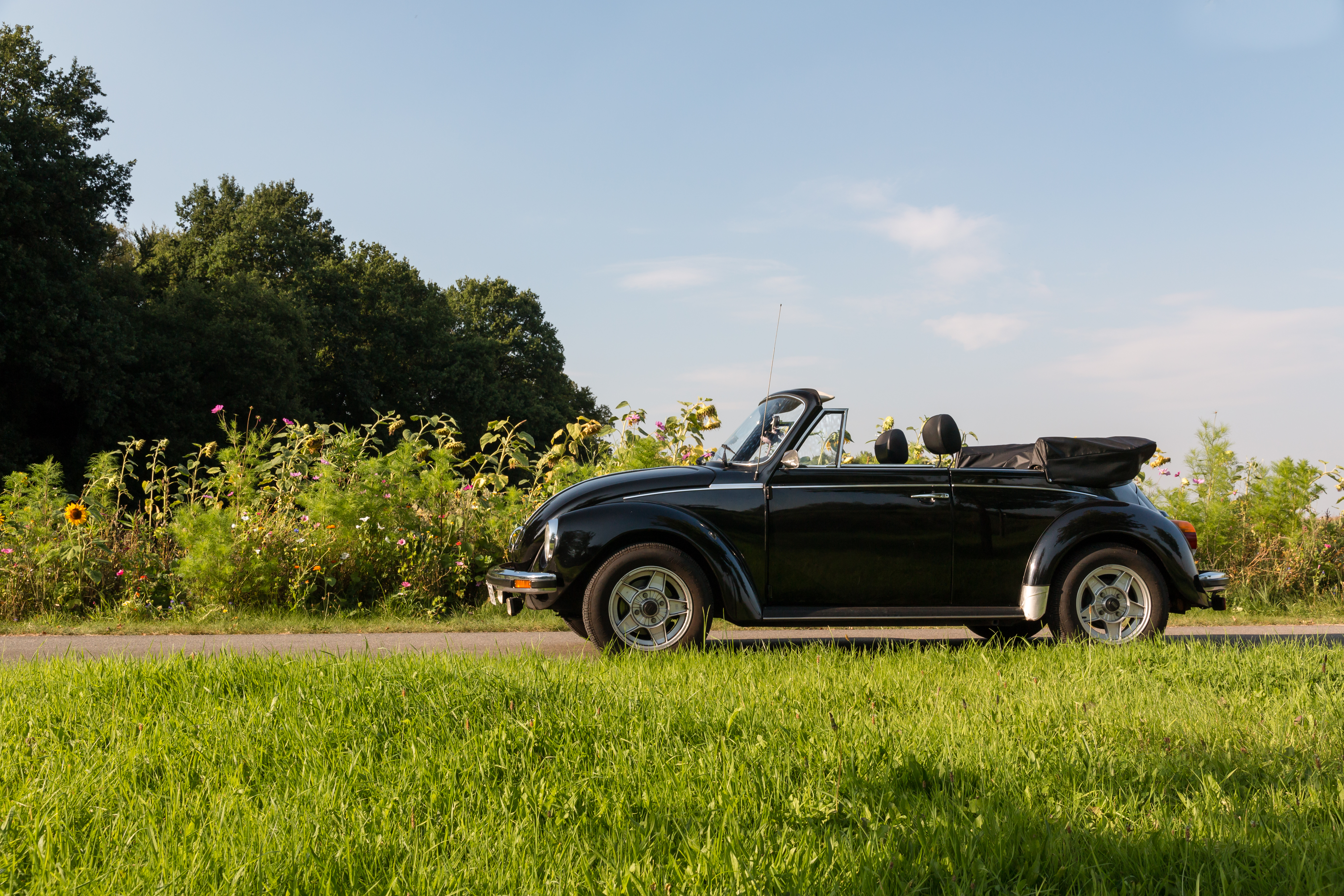
Having been exported to many countries, the VW Beetle has gained an arguably unequaled reputation.

The Volkswagen Type 1 automobile, also known as the Volkswagen Beetle or Bug, is known colloquially by various names in different countries, usually local renderings of the word "beetle". Among these are:

- Bug or Beetle-Bug in the United States
- Bogár (beetle) or bogárhátú (beetle-back) in Hungary
- 金龜車 ("Jin-guei che") in Taiwan
- عكروكة ("Agroga", little frog), ركـّة ("Rag-gah", little turtle) in Iraq
- חיפושית ("Hipushit", beetle) or Bimba in Israel
- ビートル ("Bītoru", beetle) in Japan
- Bjalla (beetle) in Iceland
- Kodok (frog) in Indonesia
- قورباغه ای ("Ghoorbaghei", frog) in Iran
- Буба ("Buba", beetle) in North Macedonia
- Kifuu (small bowl) in Kenya
- Vabole (beetle) in Latvia
- Vabalas (beetle) in Lithuania
- Kura (turtle), Kodok (frog) in Malaysia
- Kashima in Namibia
- Bhyagute car (frog car) in Nepal
- Boble (bubble) in Norway
- Cepillo (brush or ice shaver) in Dominican Republic
- خنفسة ("khon-fesa", beetle) in Egypt
- Fakrouna (tortoise) in Libya
- Põrnikas (beetle) in Estonia
- Baratinha (little cockroach) in Cape Verde
- Escarabat (beetle) in Catalan
- Poncho in Chile and Venezuela
- 甲壳虫 ("Jiǎ Ké Chóng", beetle) in China
- Buba (bug) in Croatia
- Brouk (beetle) in Czech Republic
- Sapito (little toad) in Peru
- Carocha (beetle) in Portugal
- Volky in Puerto Rico
- Broasca, Broscuţă (little frog), Buburuza (ladybird) in Romania
- Фольксваген-жук ("Folksvagen-zhuk", Volkswagen bug) in Ukraine
- Жук ("Zhuk", beetle) in Russia
- Буба ("Buba", bug) in Serbia
- Qongqothwane (beetle), Volla or Volksie (little Volkswagen), Kewer (beetle) in South Africa
- Chrobák (beetle) in Slovakia
- Hrošč (beetle) in Slovenia
- Volks, Beetle or Ibba (turtle) in Sri Lanka
- Mgongo wa Chura (frog's back) in Tanzania
- Con Bọ (bug) in Vietnam
- Bhamba Datya ("Datya", frog) in Zimbabwe
- Tortuga (tortoise) in Panama
- Цох (beetle) in Mongolia
- "فولوکس" ("Foloks", philosopher), in Afghanistan
- Buba ("the bug") in Montenegro
- Super Beetle or Super Bug in North America
- Banju Maqlub (literally, a bathtub turned upside down) in Malta
- Viwii in Malawi
- Foxi or Foxy in most of Pakistan and Daddu-car (frog car) in Punjabi speaking parts of Pakistan
- Mgongo wa Chura (frog's back), Mwendo wa Kobe (tortoise speed) in Swahili
- Folka (Volkswagen), Bagge (short for Skalbagge, beetle), Bubbla (bubble) in Sweden and Swedish-speaking Finland
- Cucaracha or Cucarachita (cockroach, little cockroach) in Guatemala, El Salvador and Honduras
- Bintus, Ijapa, Mbe, or Tortoise Car in Nigeria
- Beetle in the United Kingdom, and in many English speaking Commonwealth countries (e.g. Australia and New Zealand)
- Maggiolino (cockchafer), Maggiolone (big beetle) in Italy
- Käfer (beetle) in Germany, Austria and Alemannic Switzerland
- Kever in Dutch-speaking Belgium and the Netherlands
- Pichirilo in Ecuador and Colombia
- Pulga (flea), Escarabajo (beetle) in Colombia
- ඉබ්බා , "කනේමයිල්" (tortoise) in Sri Lanka
- Vocho, Vochito or Volcho (navel) in Mexico, Costa Rica, Colombia and Peru
- Fusca in Brazil, Paraguay and Uruguay (from "fauvê", "VW" in German pronunciation), Fusquinha (little VW) in Brazil, Fusquita (little VW) in Uruguay
- Escarabajo (beetle) in Argentina, Chile, Colombia, Paraguay, Peru, Spain, Uruguay, El Salvador, Costa Rica, Panama
- Peta (turtle) in Bolivia
- Pendong, Kotseng kuba (hunchback car), Pagong, Ba-o, (turtle), Boks (tin can), sometimes Beetle in the Philippines
- Garbus (hunchback) in Poland
- Folcika or Buba (bug) in Bosnia and Herzegovina
- Косτенурка ("Kostenurka", turtle), Бръмбар ("Brambar", beetle) in Bulgaria
- Boblen (The bubble), Bobbelfolkevogn (bubble Volkswagen), Asfaltboblen (The asphalt bubble), Billen (The Beetle) gravid rulleskøjte (pregnant rollerskate) or Hitlerslæden (Hitler-sled) in Denmark
- Kupla (bubble), Kuplavolkkari (bubble Volkswagen), Aatun kosto (Adi's revenge) in Finland
- Coccinelle (ladybug) in France, French-speaking Belgium and Switzerland, Algeria, Quebec and Haiti
- Choupette (Herbie's name in the French version of the movie) in French Canada
- Σκαθάρι ("Skathari", beetle), Σκαραβαίος ("Skaraveos", scarab), Χελώνα ("Chelona", turtle), Κατσαριδάκι ("Katsaridaki", little cockroach) in Greece
- Sedán (sedan car), Pulguita (little flea), Vocho/Vochito or Bocho/Bochito (little Volkswagen) in Mexico and across Latin America
- รถเต่า ("Rod Tao", turtle car), โฟล์คเต่า ("Volk Tao", Volkswagen turtle) in Thai
- Kaplumbağa (turtle), Tosbağa (tortoise), Vosvos in Turkey
- 비틀 (beetle) or 카푸어 (bug) in Korea
