= NDR-Klein-Computer =

NDR Klein Computer
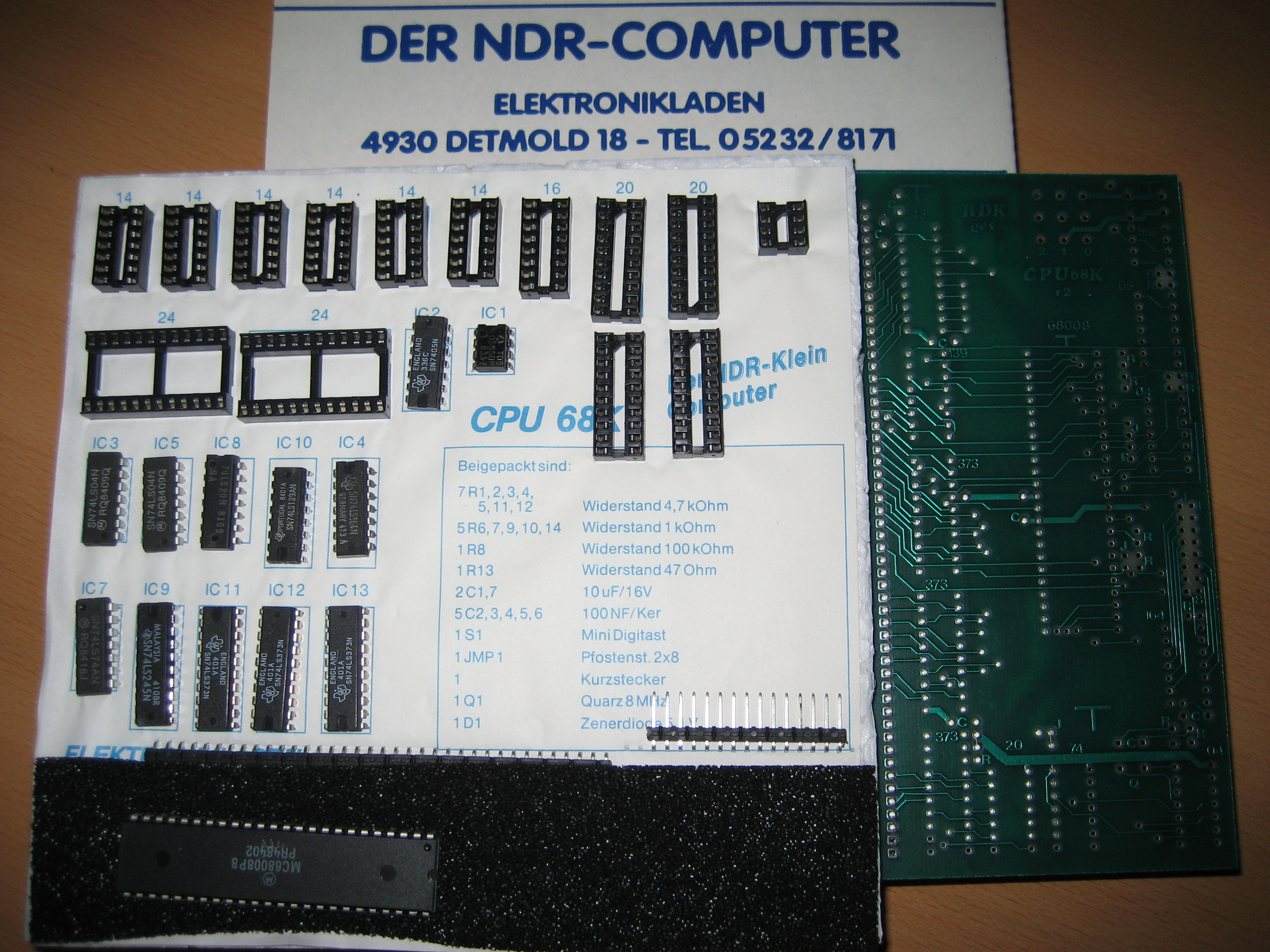
- Kit for 68k-card
- Also known as: NKC
- Developer: Rolf-Dieter Klein and Joachim Arendt
- Manufacturer: Graf-Elektroniksysteme
- Type: Single-board computer
- Released: 1984; 42 years ago
- Operating system: CP/M
- CPU: Zilog Z80A or Motorola 68020
- Memory: 64 KB RAM

NDR-Klein-Computer
- Created by: Rolf-Dieter Klein, Joachim Arendt
- Presented by: Rolf-Dieter Klein
- Country of origin: Germany
- Original language: German
- No. of seasons: 1
- No. of episodes: 26

Production
- Running time: 15 minutes

Original release
- Network: NDR-Schulfernsehen
- Release: 1984

The NDR Klein Computer, abbreviated NKC, was a do-it-yourself computer project from the early 1980s developed by Rolf-Dieter Klein (RDK) and Joachim Arendt. In 1984, the computer was featured in the educational television series NDR-Klein-Computer for NDR-Schulfernsehen (NDR School Television). It was also broadcast on the computer television show ComputerTreff on the Bavarian TV network Bayerisches Fernsehen (BFS).

== History ==
The NDR Klein Computer was created by Rolf-Dieter Klein, a computer enthusiast who regularly contributed articles to the German computer magazine mc. His plan was not only to give a basic introduction to the way a computer operates, but also to introduce a modular system through which laymen could learn to complete basic programming exercises, as well as acquire the skills to operate a high-end home computer. Under the direction of Joachim Arendt, they developed a television series that was picked up by Norddeutscher Rundfunk (NDR) for its NDR-Schulfernsehen (NDR School Television) channel. The series, titled NDR-Klein-Computer, consisted of twenty-six episodes of fifteen minutes each. Klein hosted the show and wrote articles in mc to supplement the series. He published a book on the same subject, titled: Microcomputer Selbstgebaut und Programmiert (DIY Microcomputer Building and Programming), through Franzis Verlag, which also released the TV series on VHS. The computer's hardware was provided by Graf Elektronik System in Kempten, and sold at an electronics store in Detmold. The company Fischertechnik also produced a robot kit, which was one of the most comprehensive 32-bit programming language applications at the time.

== Features ==
The NKC was built with several different hardware configurations, from a simple 8-bit single-board computer based on a Zilog Z80A processor to a 32-bit system equipped with a Motorola 68020 CPU. The software could be loaded with EPROMs or involve an operating system such as CP/M which could handle executable programs in various programming languages.

A helper card with an Intel 8088 processor allowed the NKC to run MS-DOS. Systems could be customized to handle many different peripherals including PS/2 keyboard, 3½-inch floppy disks, IDE-hard drives and modern storage. Users have developed new cards which replaced the former specialized components. For instance, a system could contain a new graphics card (with VGA connector), one serial port, a sound card, PC keyboard and a mouse connector. Another system configuration that supports booting via the IDE-interface has been developed for the 68xxx family.

== Gallery ==
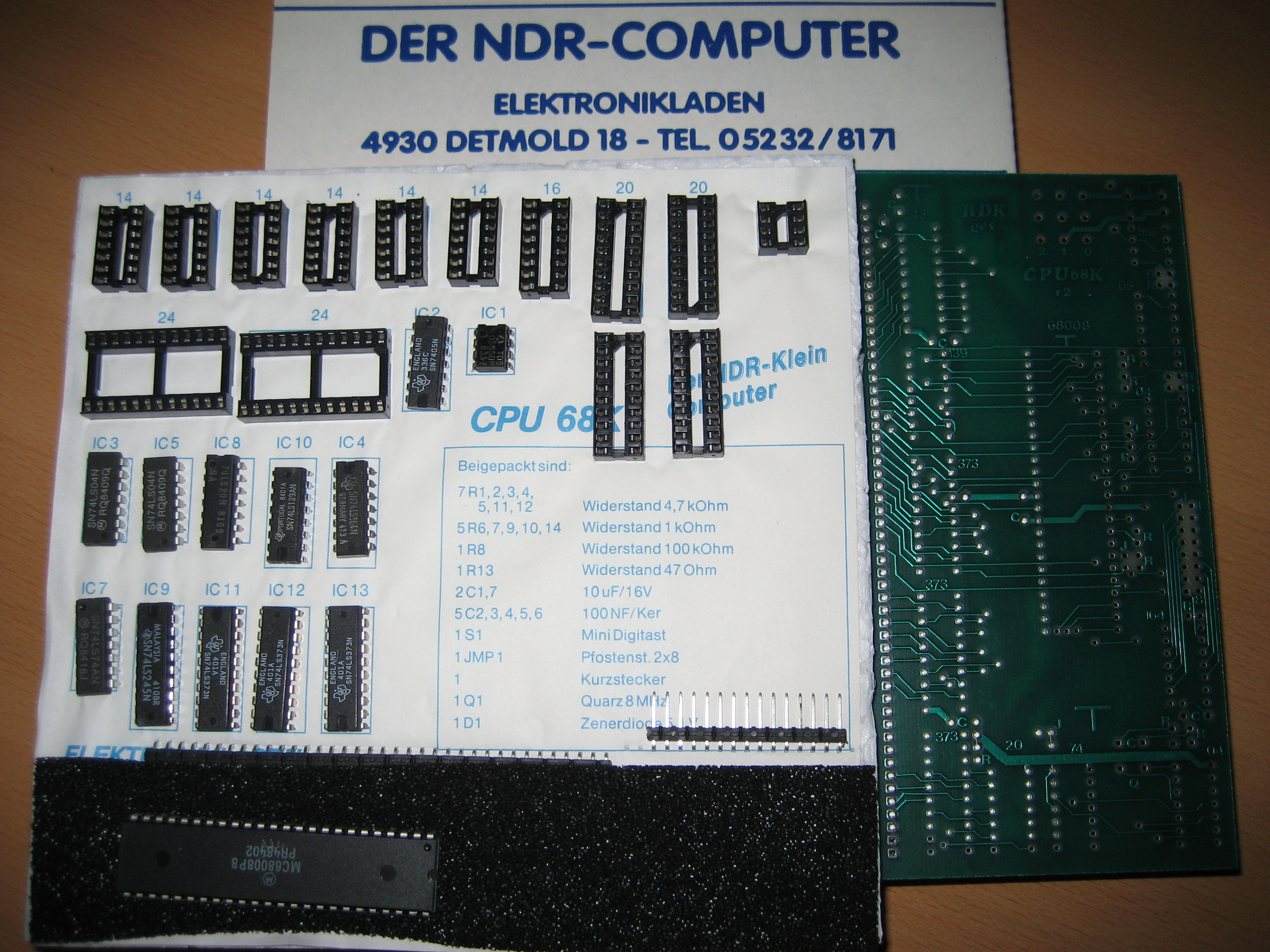
Kit for a 68K-card

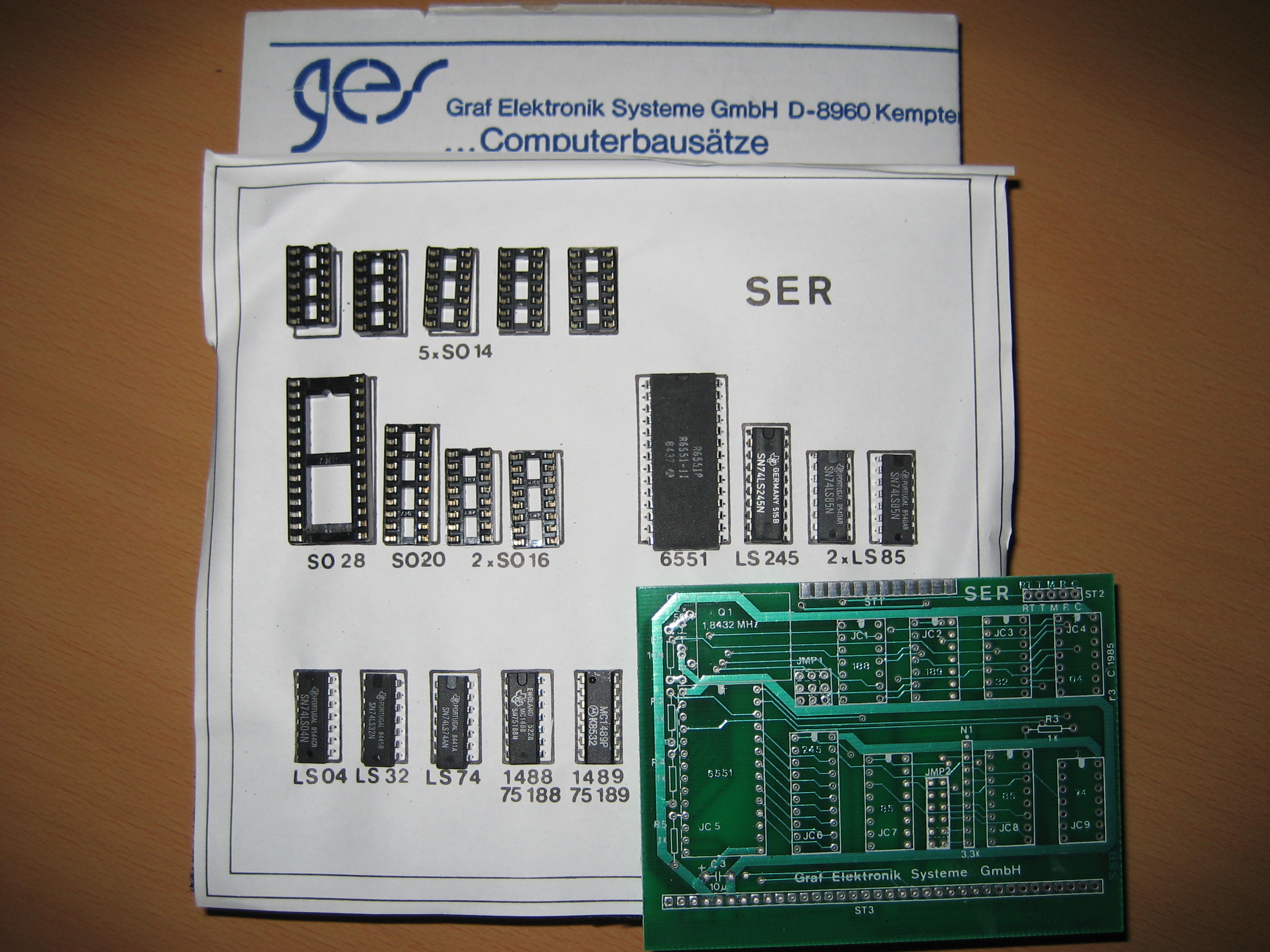
Kit for serial card

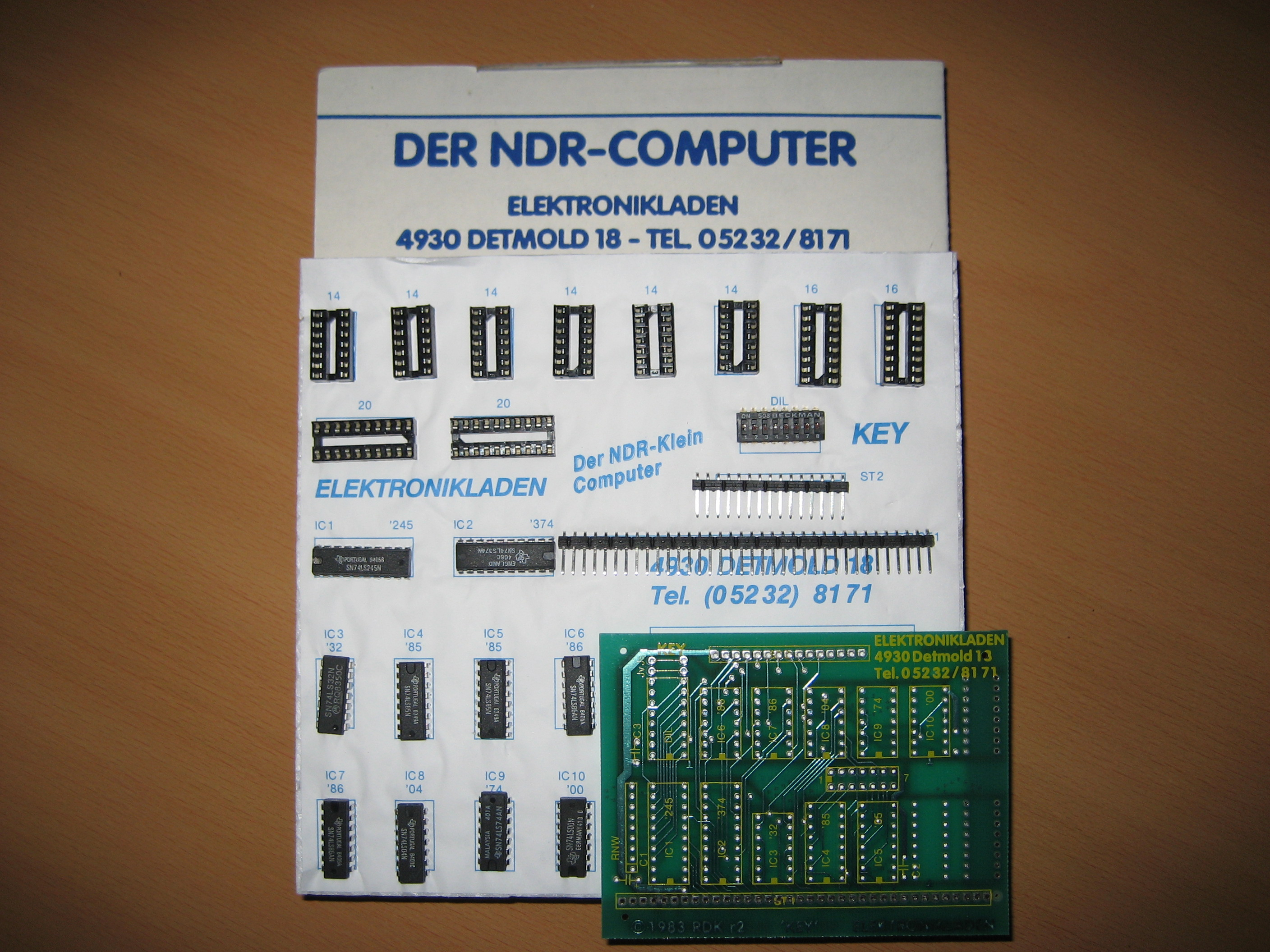
Kit for keyboard interface

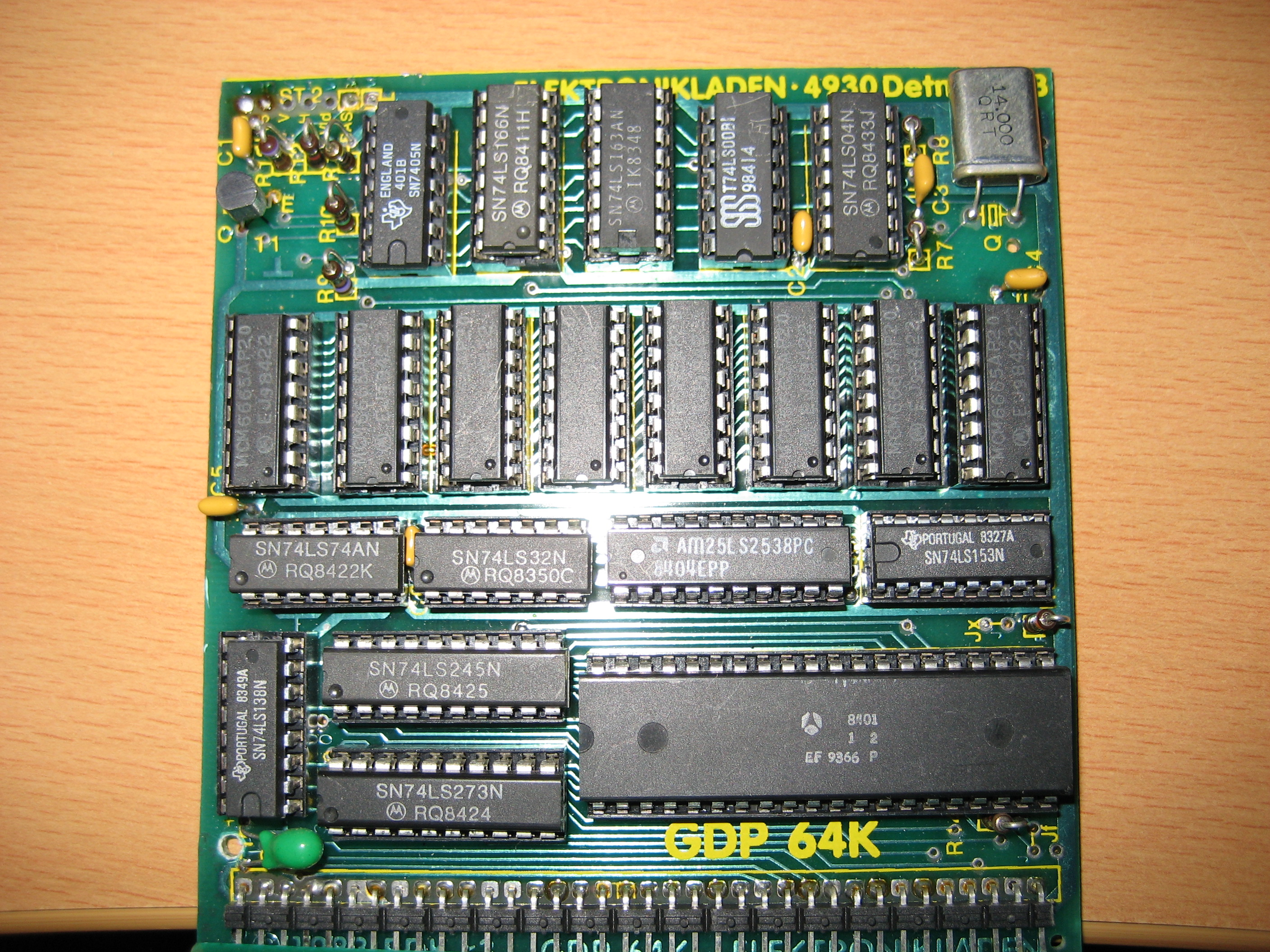
Assembled graphics card

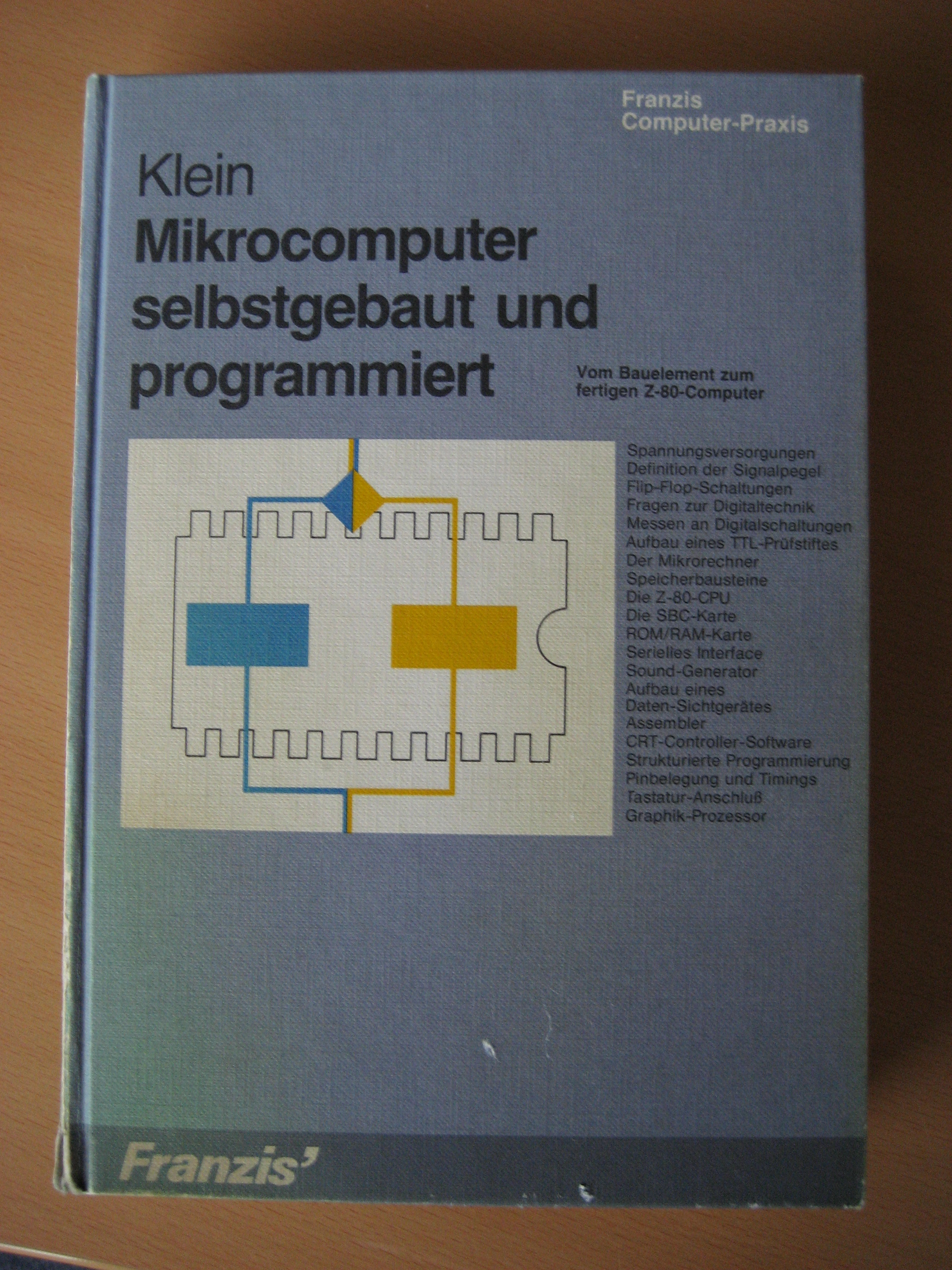
The book

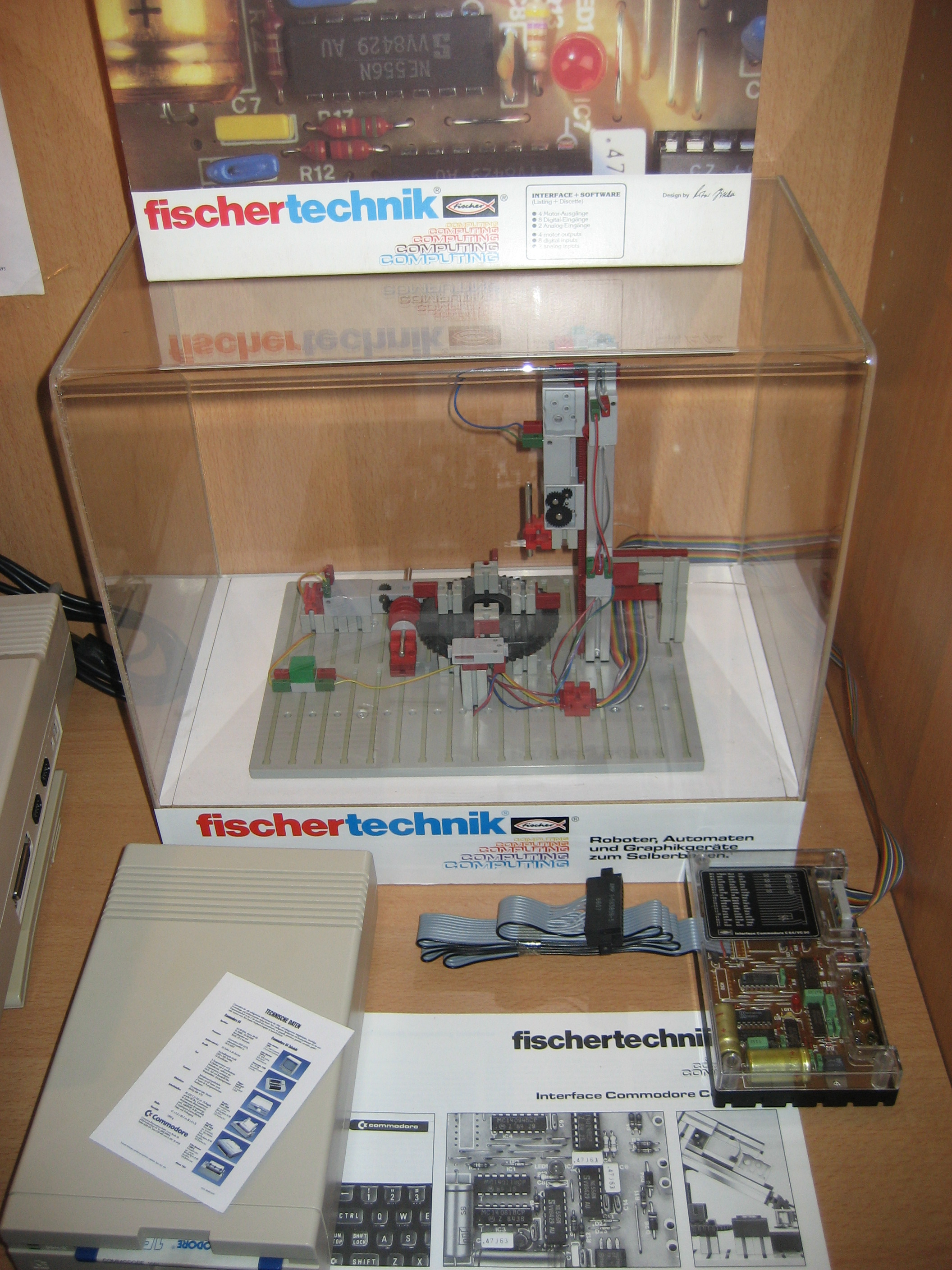
Fischertechnik Computing with Commodore 64 interface

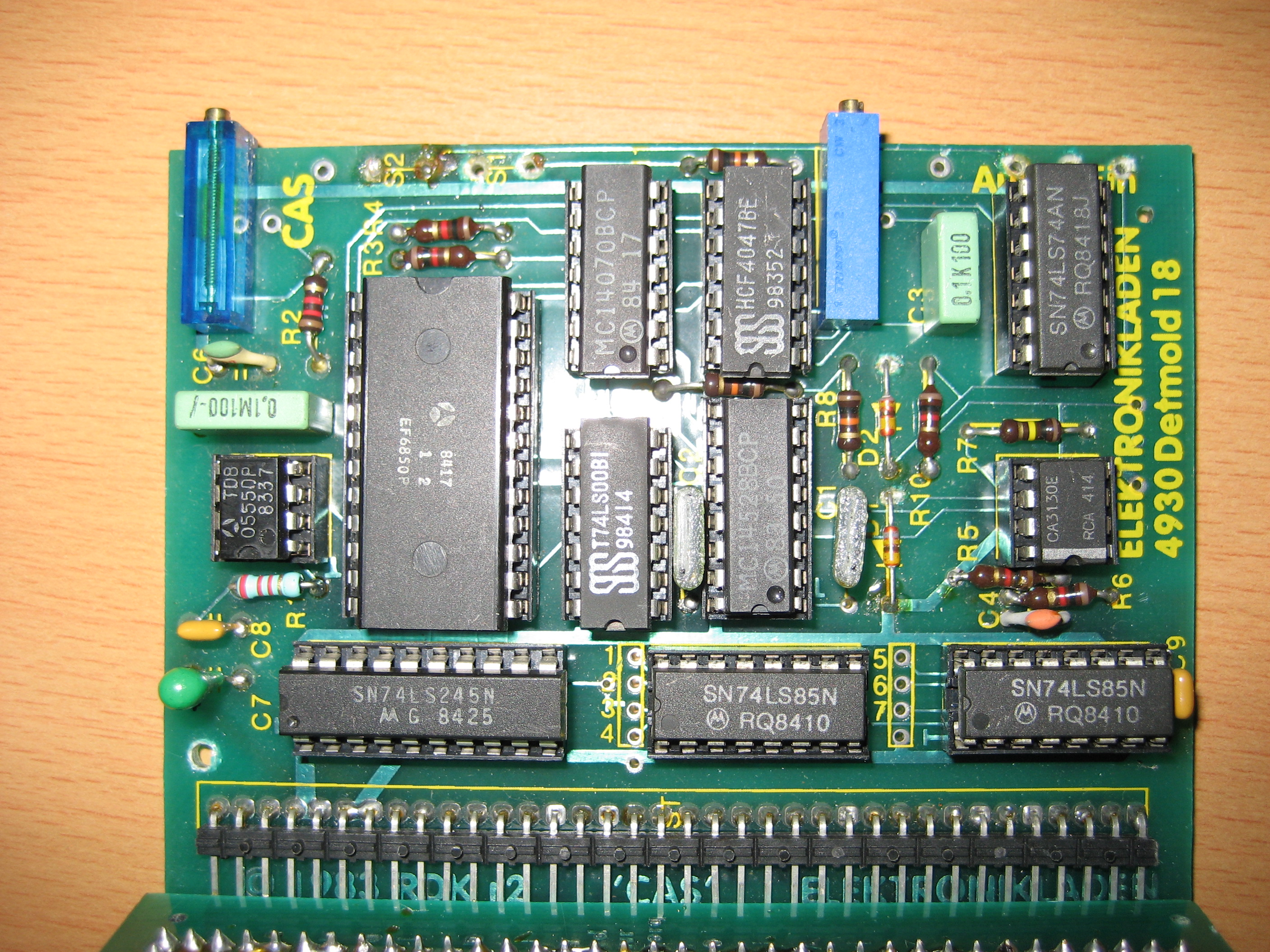
CAS-card for NDR-Klein Computers

== Books ==
- Klein, Rolf-Dieter [in German] (1988). Mikrocomputer selbstgebaut und programmiert (in German). Franzis Verlag. 419pp. ISBN 978-3-77237162-2.
- Klein, Rolf-Dieter [in German] (1998). Rechner Modular (in German). Franzis Verlag. ISBN 978-3-77238721-0.

== See also ==
- BBC computer
- WDR computer
- Thomson EF9366
