= Veloce Publishing =

- Status: Active
- Founded: 1991
- Country of origin: United Kingdom
- Headquarters location: Poundbury, Dorchester, Dorset
- Key people: Rod Grainger & Jude Brooks
- Publication types: Books eBooks; Mobile apps
- Nonfiction topics: Automotive; Animal Welfare; Military History; General subjects
- Imprints: Veloce (Automotive); Hubble & Hattie (Animal Welfare); Battle Cry (Military History); Earthworld Publishing (General subjects)
- Official website: www.veloce.co.uk

Veloce Publishing is primarily an automotive book publisher based in Poundbury, Dorset. Founded in 1991 by Rod Grainger and Jude Brooks, it has published close to 1000 titles under the Veloce imprint, and over 80 titles under its Hubble & Hattie imprint, which deals with animal-related subjects.

The company name was derived from the Italian for ‘speed’ and was inspired by Alfa-Romeo, who used the term to denote its faster models. The name also references Velocette motorcycles, which formed the subject of one the company's earliest titles.

Veloce's Mazda MX-5 Miata workshop manual, was one of its first published titles, and was written by founder Rod Grainger and Pete Shoemark.

Veloce has published books by a range of notable authors, including TV presenter Mike Brewer, former Rallying champion and Top Gear pundit Tony Mason, Supercar dealer Tom Hartley, and, under the Hubble and Hattie imprint, astronomer Sir Patrick Moore.

In February 2024 the Veloce imprint, together with their Hubble & Hattie and Earthworld imprints, was acquired by publishers David & Charles.
