= Franzis =

German publisher

Franzis GmbH is a German publisher based in the Haar suburb of Munich, Germany and is part of the WEKA Mediengruppe. Founded in 1920 as a publishing house for technical books, it now publishes both technical and computer-related books and software, including the German distribution of products such as Photomatix Pro and Alcohol 120%.
